= St. Lawrence Church, Edacochin =

Church in the Roman Catholic Diocese of Cochin in Kerala, India

Coordinates: 9°53′49″N 76°17′46″E

St Lawrence Church Edacochin
- Ecclesia Sancti Laurentii Edacochin
- Igreja de São Lourenço Edacochim
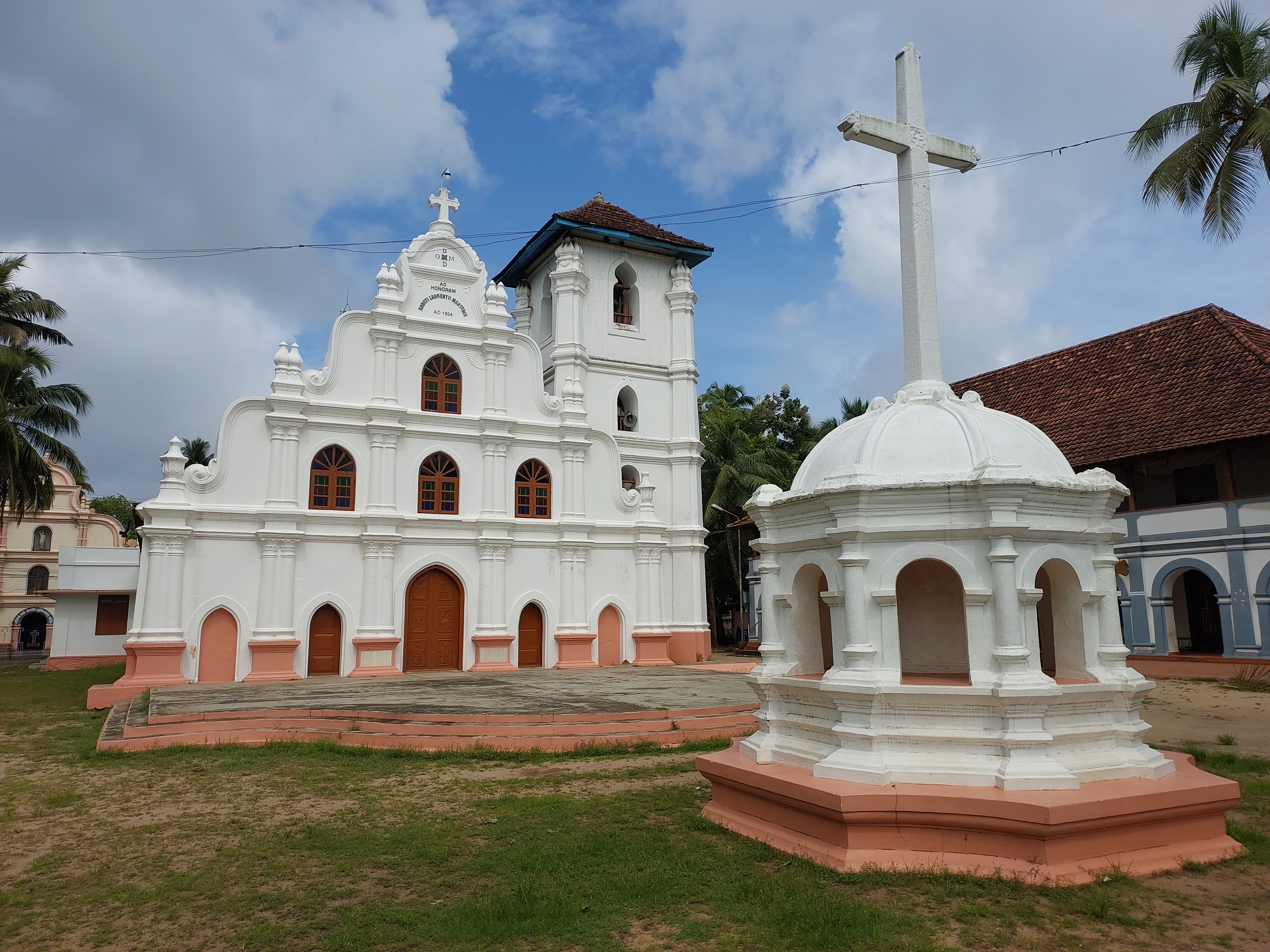
- St Lawrence Church Edacochin
- Location: Edakochi Ernakulam, Kerala
- Address: St. Lawrence Church, Edacochin Cochin - 682010
- Country: India
- Language(s): Malayalam & English

History
- Status: Catholic Church
- Founded: 1119
- Dedication: Saint Lawrence

Architecture
- Functional status: Active
- Style: Inspired by Gothic

Administration
- District: Ernakulam
- Province: Verapoly
- Diocese: Roman Catholic Diocese of Cochin

Clergy
- Bishop: Antony Kattiparambil
- Vicar: Rev Fr Varghese Cheruthiyil

St. Lawrence Church, Edacochin, is a church in the Roman Catholic Diocese of Cochin in Kerala, India. The church is known for its Portuguese-influenced architecture, as well as for the tomb of Servant of God Lawrence Puliyanath, the church is a centre of Christian pilgrimage in Kochi.

== Gallery ==
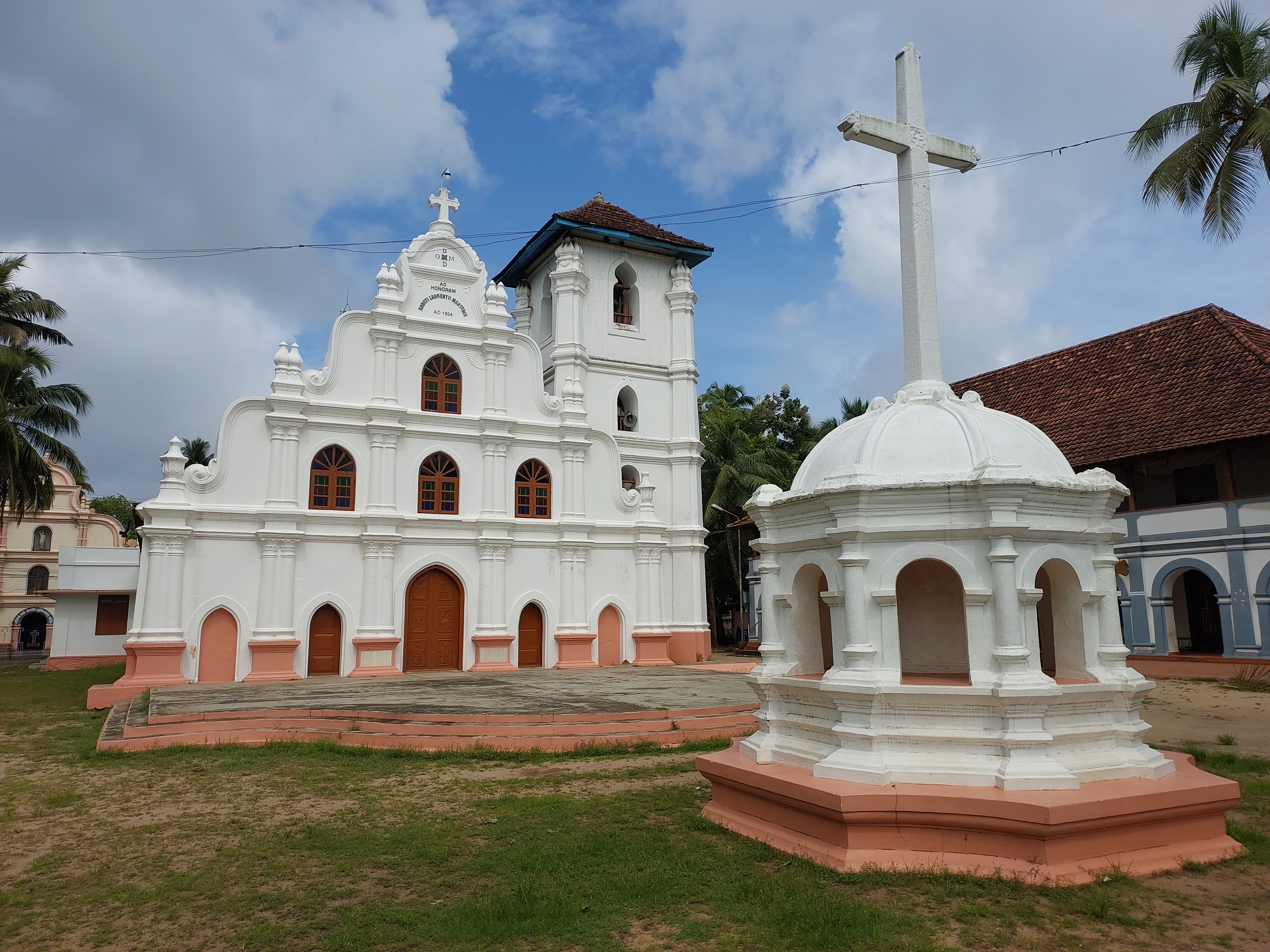
St Lawrence Church

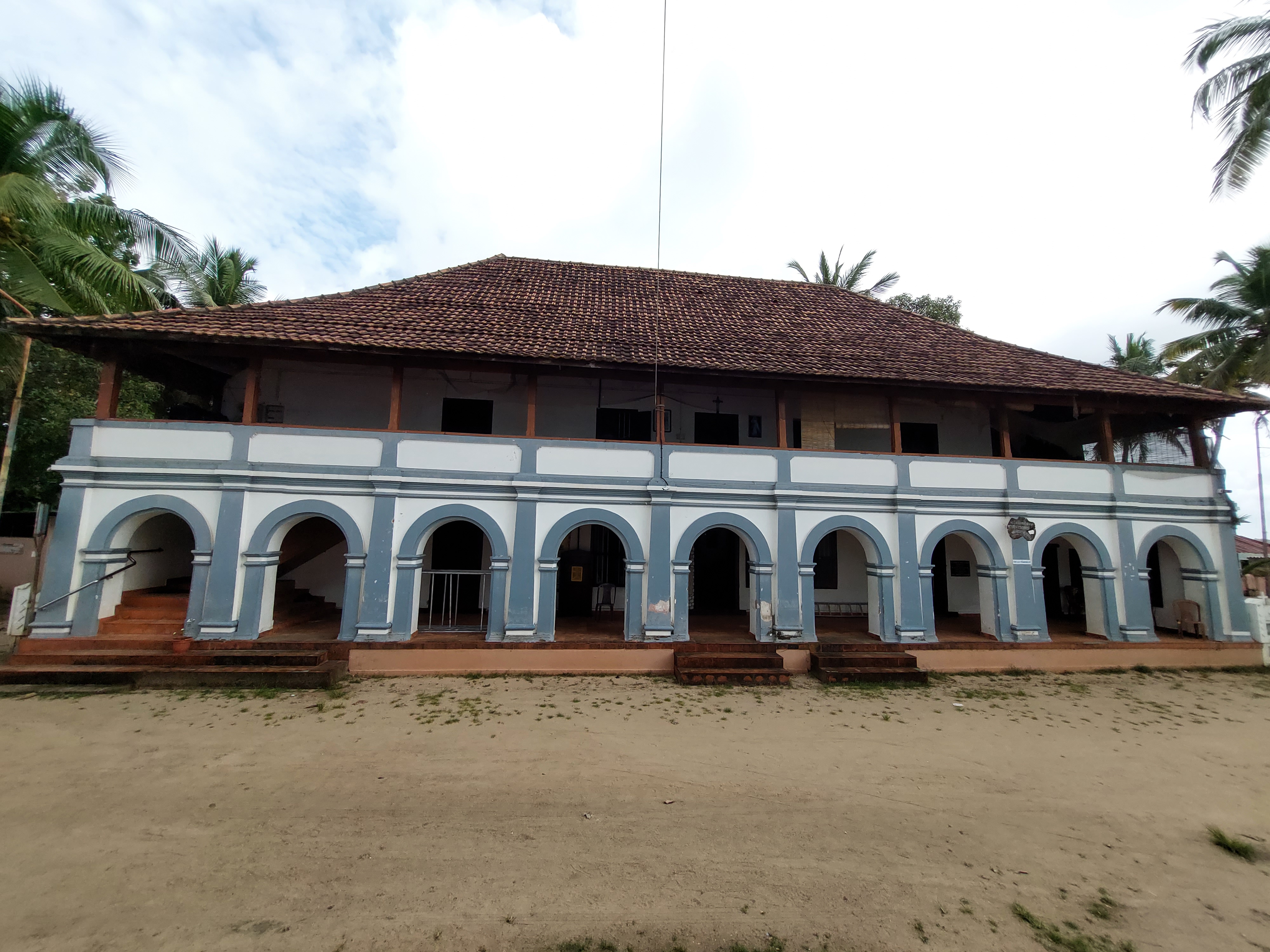
Oldest Parochial House

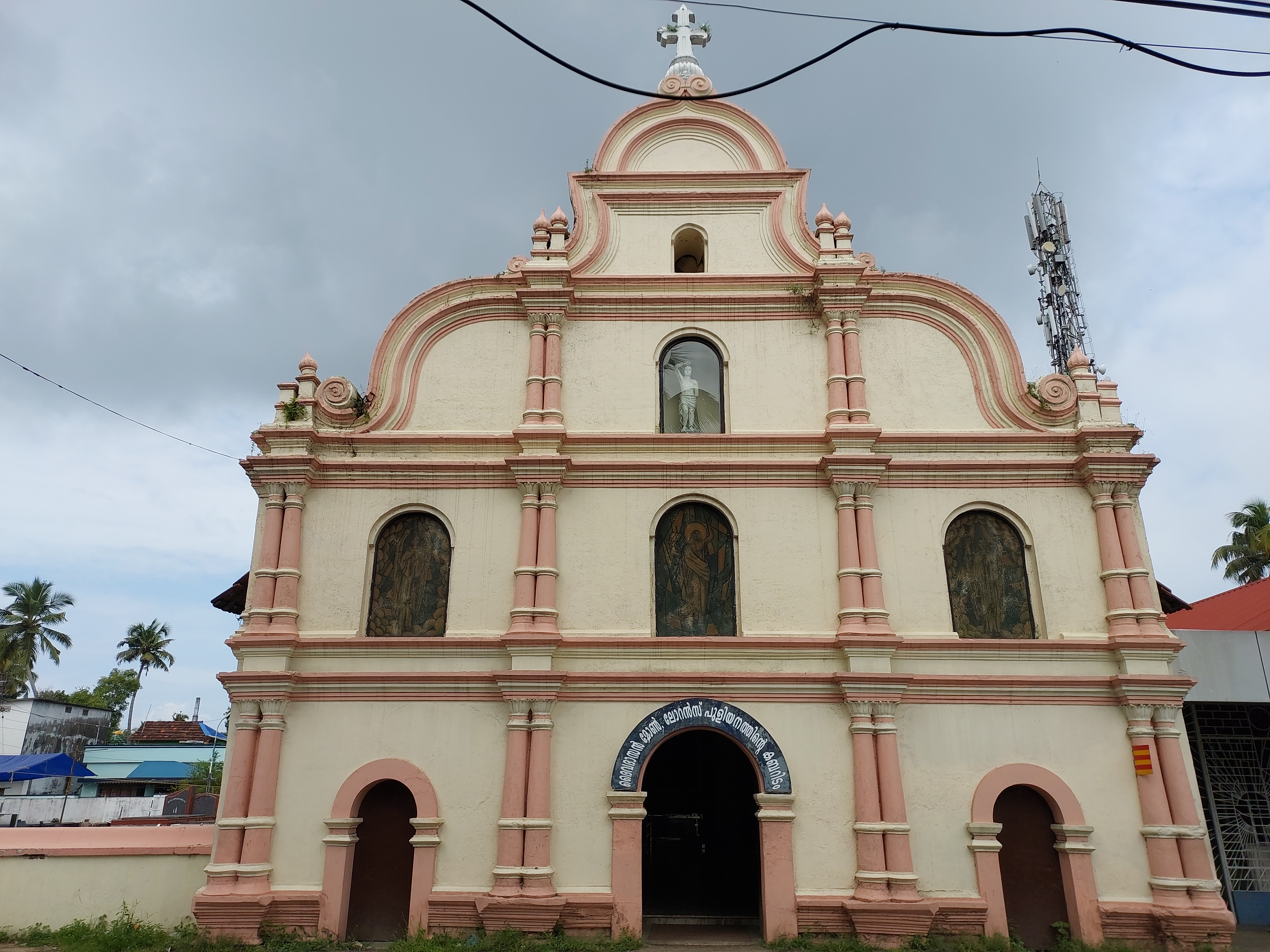
St Sebastians Church

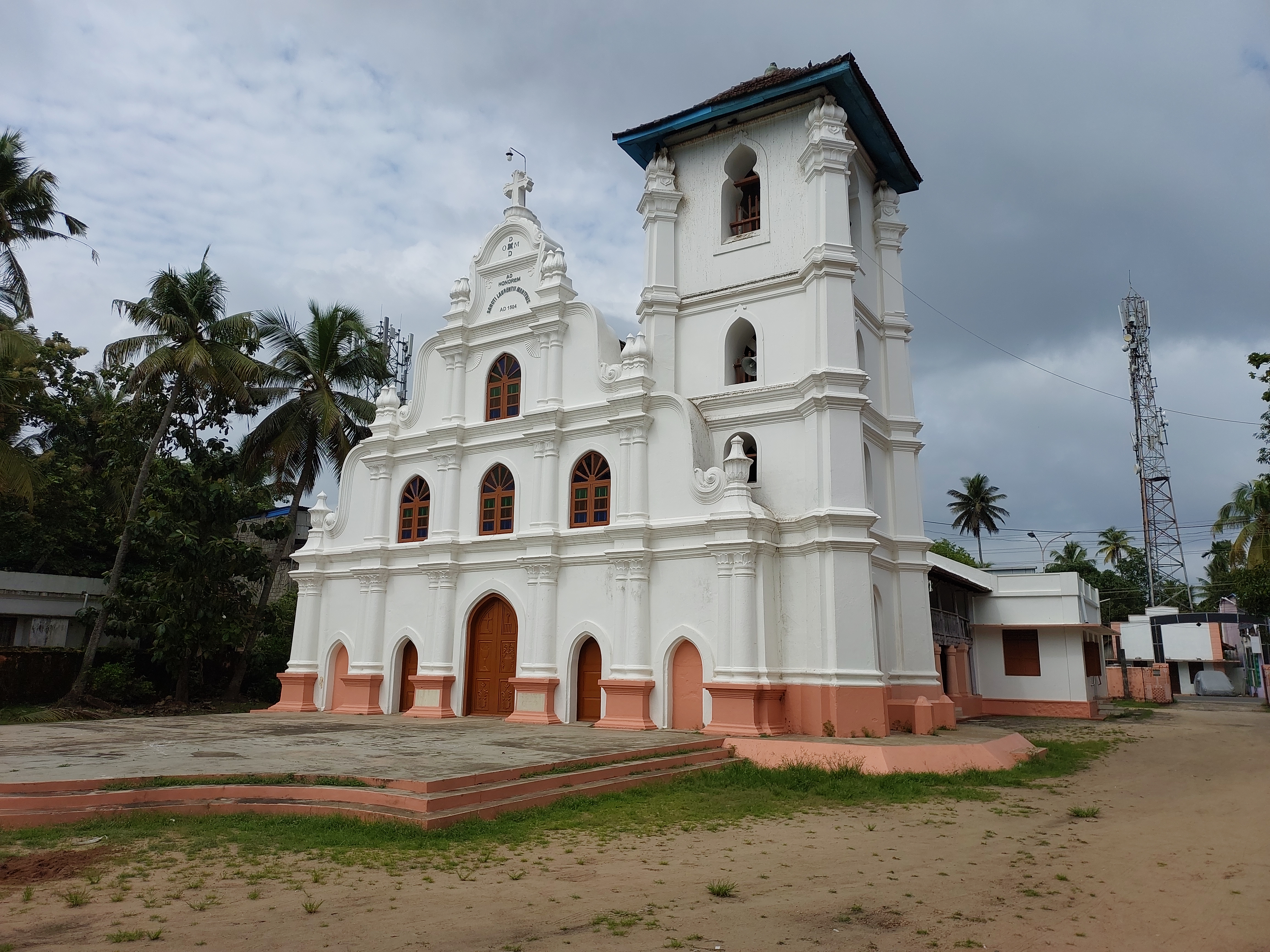
Side View

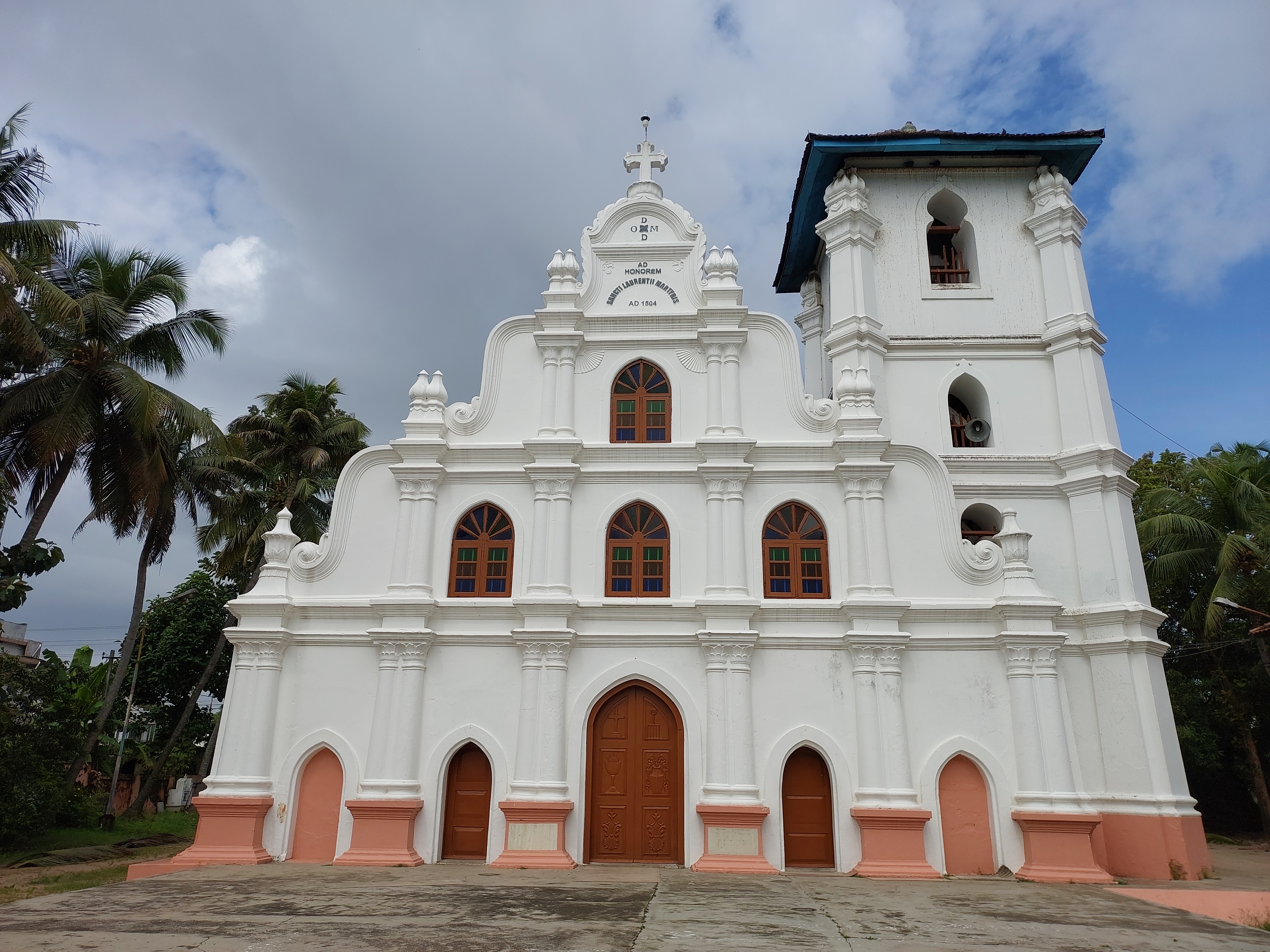
Front View

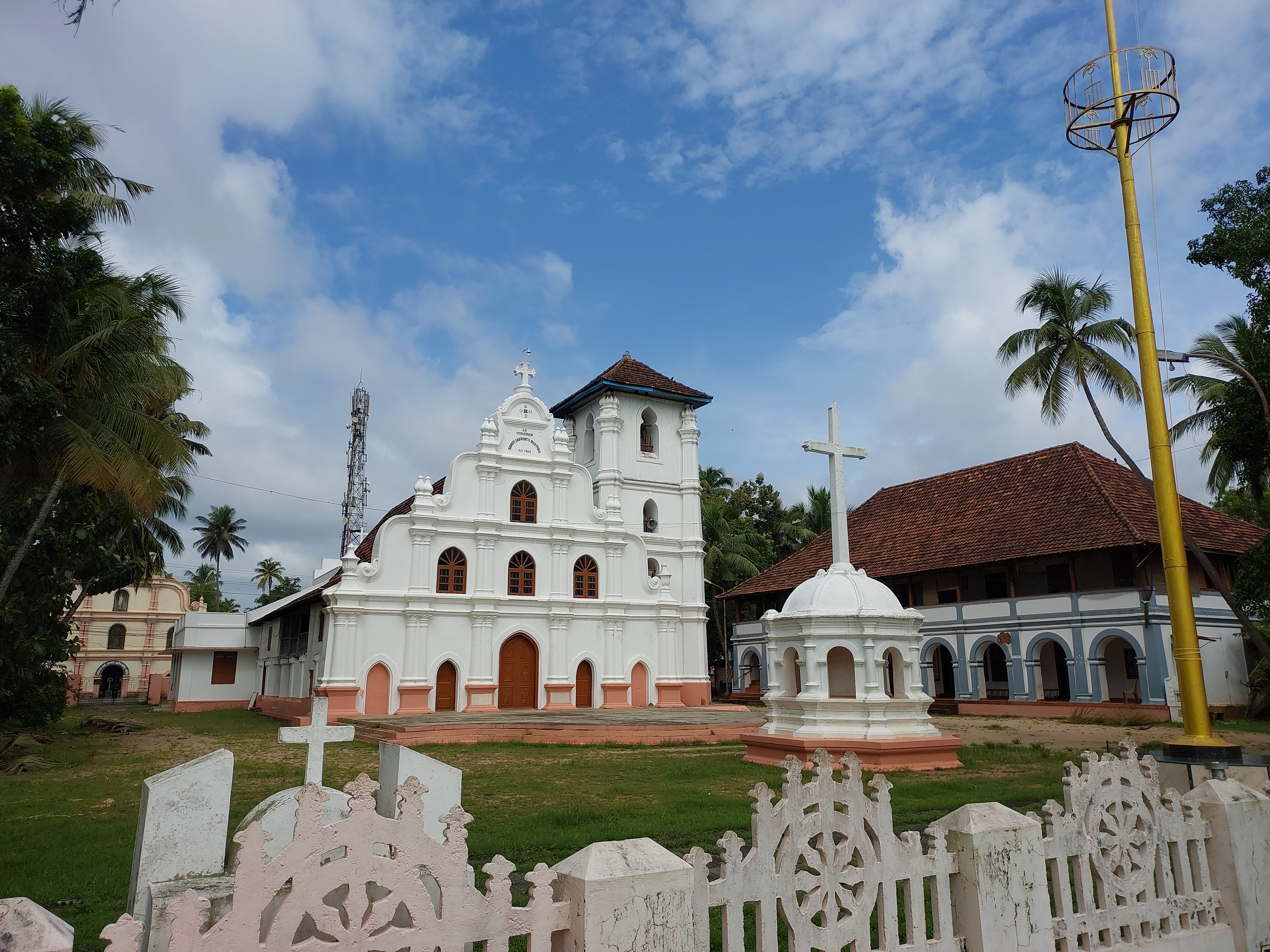
Full View

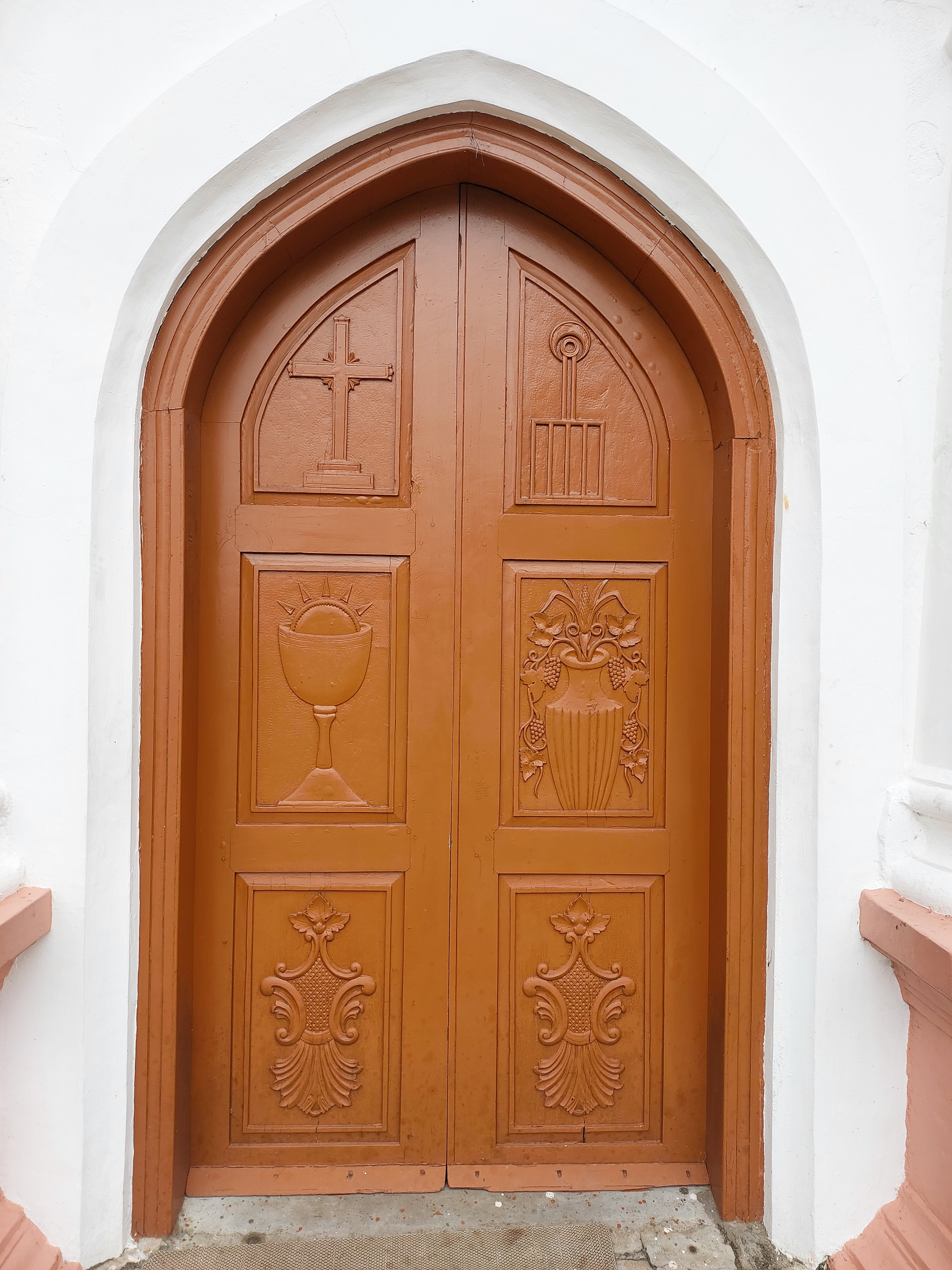
Front Door

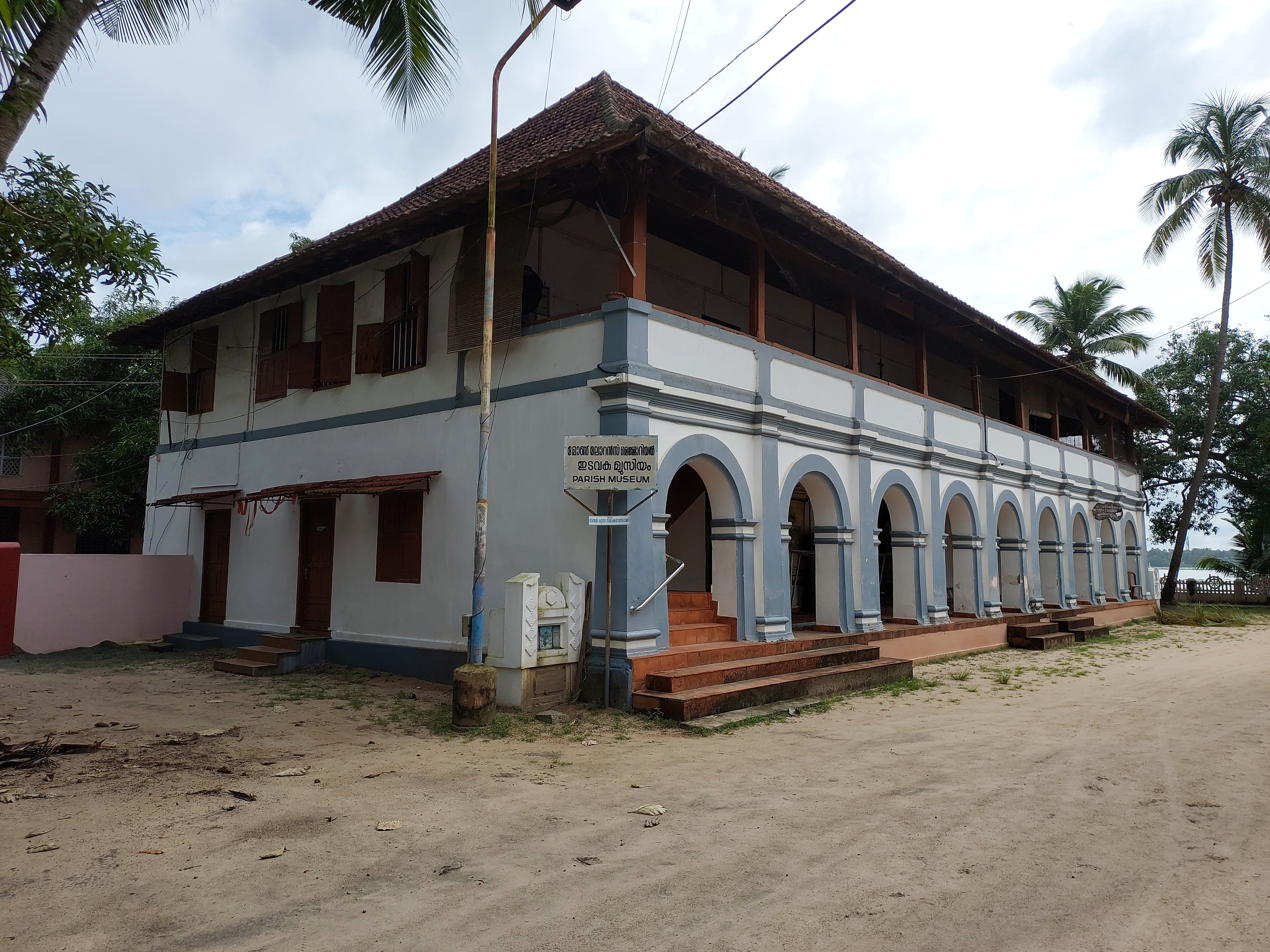
Parochial House

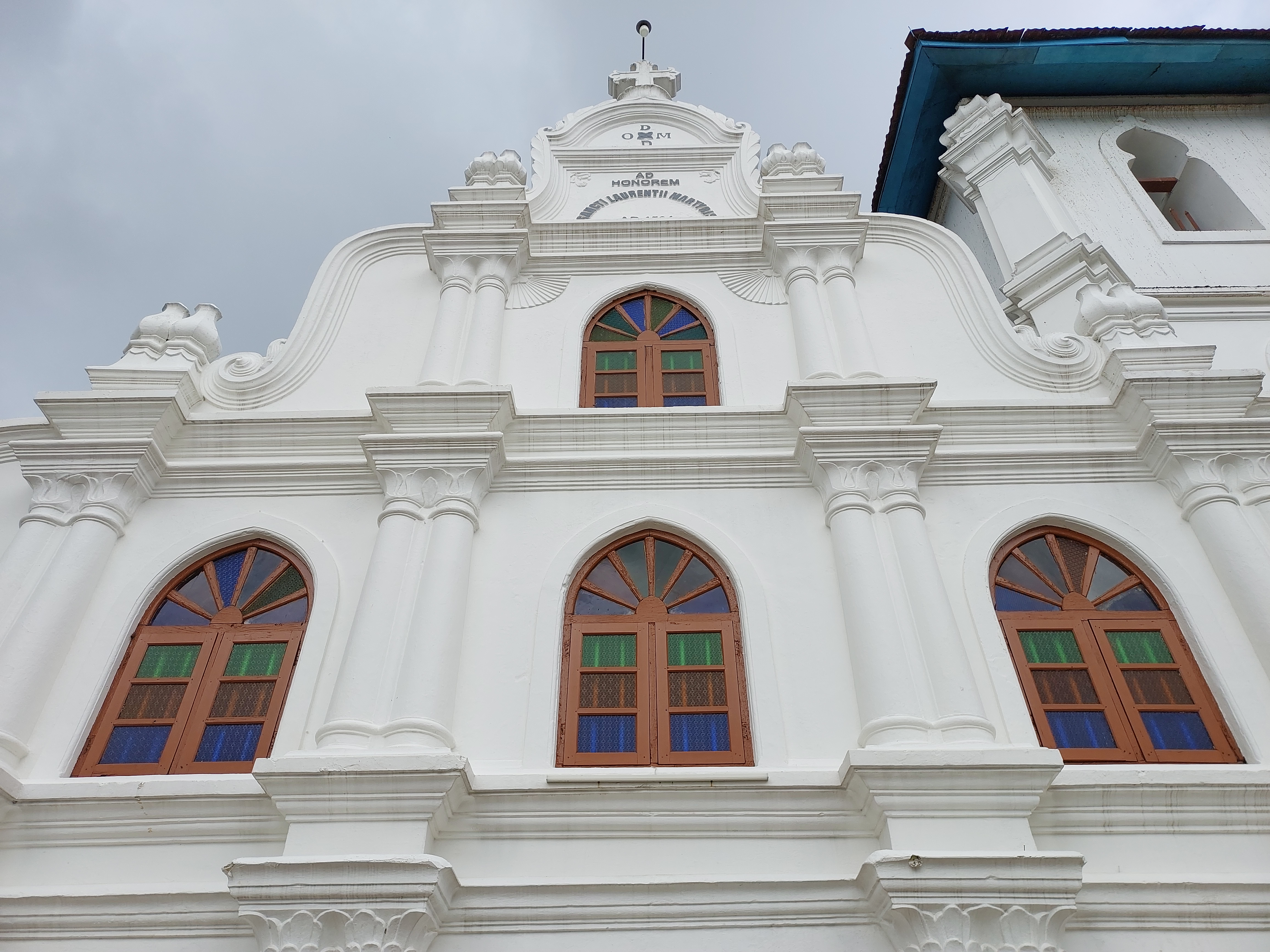
Stained Glass Windows
