= St Antony's Forane Church, Kannamaly =

St. Antony's Forane Church
- St. Antony's Forane Church & St. Joseph's Miraculous Shrine
- Kannamaly Pally
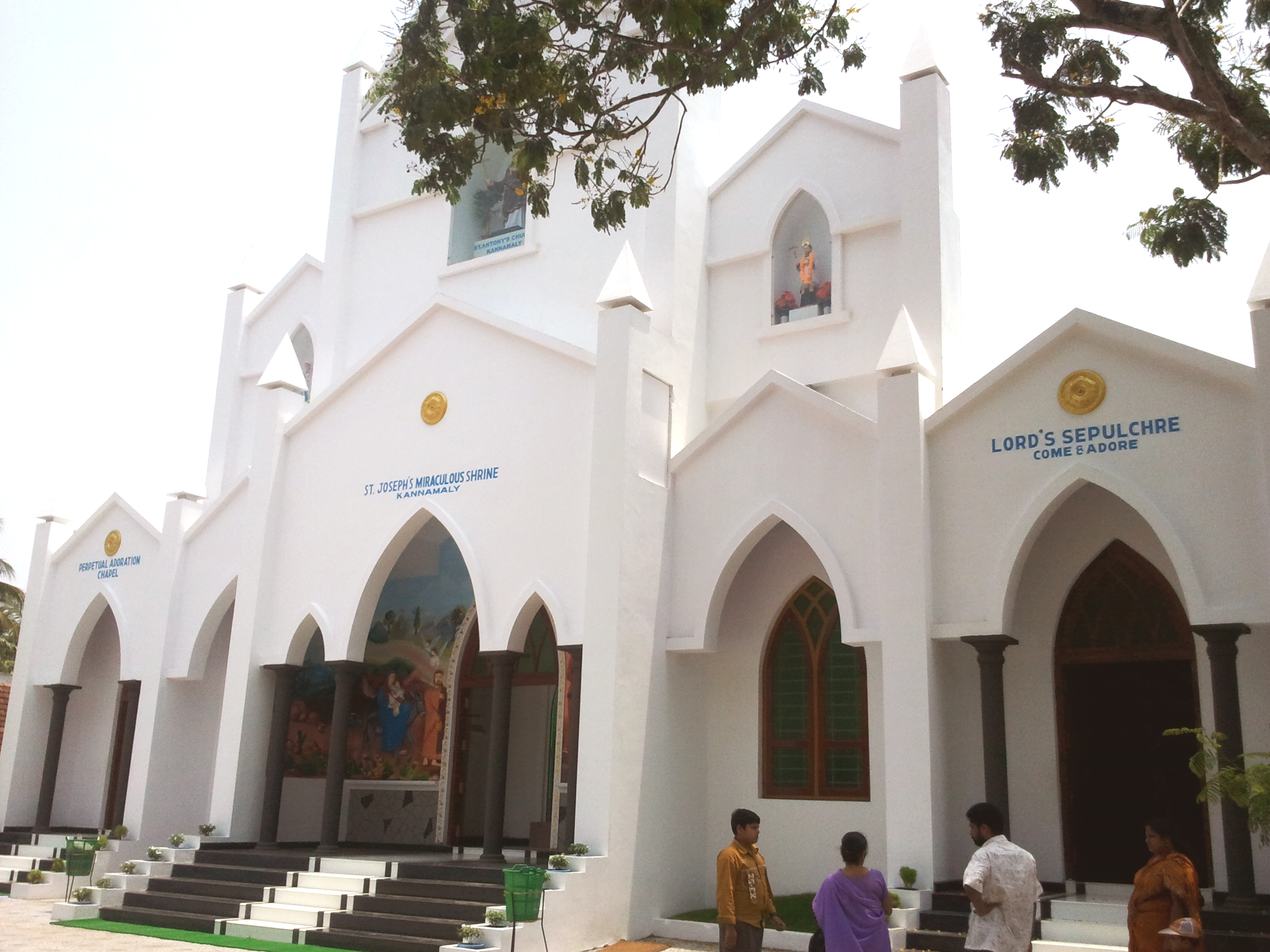

- Location in Kerala, India
- 9.875648°N 76.264606°E
- Location: Kannamaly, Kochi, Ernakulam district, Kerala
- Country: India
- Denomination: Catholic
- Sui iuris church: Latin Church
- Tradition: Roman Rite
- Website: Official website

History
- Status: Forane Church (Parish)
- Founded: 1873 (as parish)
- Dedication: St. Antony of Padua

Architecture
- Functional status: Active
- Architectural type: Church
- Style: Roman-inspired (modeled on the Basilica of Saint Paul Outside the Walls)
- Years built: Early 20th century – 1942

Administration
- Province: Archdiocese of Verapoly
- Diocese: Diocese of Cochin
- Parish: Kannamaly

St. Antony's Forane Church (also known as Kannamaly Pally) is a historic Catholic Latin Church pilgrimage church located in Kannamaly, a coastal suburb of Kochi, in the Ernakulam district of Kerala, India. The church is administered by the Diocese of Cochin, and is known for St. Joseph's Miraculous Shrine, which is attached to it. The church is particularly famous for its annual feast on March 19, which features a massive communal meal known as the Nercha Sadhya, an event that draws hundreds of thousands of pilgrims.

== History ==
The origins of the Christian community in Kannamaly date back to 1745, when a small chapel was constructed. This original structure, located approximately 2.5 Km west of the current site, was eventually lost to severe sea erosion. For an extended period, the Catholic community of Kannamaly was under the pastoral care of St. Louis Church in Mundamveli. This changed in 1873, when Kannamaly was established as an independent parish.

The present church building is the third on the current site, its predecessors also having been damaged by coastal erosion and sea attacks. The foundation stone for the current edifice was laid in the early 20th century. On November 22, 1942, the church was blessed and dedicated to Saint Antony of Padua by Dom José Vieira Alvernaz, the 31st Portuguese Bishop of Cochin. The architecture of this structure is inspired by the Basilica of Saint Paul Outside the Walls in Rome.

== St. Joseph's Miraculous Shrine and the 1905 Miracle ==
While the parish church is dedicated to St. Antony, its fame is linked to the adjacent Shrine of St. Joseph.

According to local tradition and church records, a catastrophic event—described in some accounts as a tsunami struck the Kannamaly coast in 1905. The ensuing destruction of freshwater sources led to a cholera epidemic, which caused numerous deaths and widespread suffering among the predominantly fishing community.

The parish priest at the time, Fr. Joseph Suarez (or Swaras), found himself overwhelmed by the crisis. Facing despair, tradition holds that on the night of March 18, Fr. Suarez had a vision of St. Joseph. The next morning, March 19, the Feast of St. Joseph, he gathered the surviving faithful. He prepared a meal, blessed it, and shared it with the people, encouraging them to take it to their sick family members, despite the fear of contagion. It is believed that those who partook of this blessed meal were miraculously cured, and the cholera epidemic ceased in Kannamaly.

In gratitude for this believed intercession, the community vowed to commemorate the event annually. The tradition of the Nercha Sadhya (votive meal) began that very year, 1905, and has continued uninterrupted for over a century. Central to this devotion is a statue of St. Joseph, which was brought from Spain in 1905, the same year as the miraculous event, and is venerated as a "Miraculous Statue."

== The Annual Feast and Nercha Sadhya ==
The Feast of St. Joseph, celebrated annually on March 19, is the church's most significant event. Locally known as Oottu Thirunal (Feast of Feeding), it transforms the village of Kannamaly into a pilgrimage center. The main attraction is the blessed communal meal, which is called the Nercha Sadhya, and is served to all attendees.

The event involves the parish's 1,500 families and numerous volunteers from across Kerala. Preparations begin weeks in advance. A dedicated committee oversees the procurement of provisions, often donated by devotees. This includes sacks of rice, vegetables like yam (with one family reportedly donating 2,000 kilos annually), onions (1,000 kilos), bitter gourd (500 kilos), mangoes (800 kilos), coconuts, and other ingredients.

In the days leading up to the feast, large-scale food preparation takes place in a makeshift kitchen on the church grounds. On the night of March 18, huge fires are lit to cook rice and curries in massive vessels throughout the night.

On the feast day, following a solemn Mass, food distribution begins. While historically served as a traditional sadya on banana leaves for people seated on the ground, the massive crowds have led to adaptations, such as a buffet system, to manage the flow. Estimates suggest the meal is served to between 100,000 and 250,000 people, with volunteers distributing food continuously for up to 12 hours.

== Architecture ==
The church building is a prominent landmark on the coastal highway, featuring a tall white facade accented with sea-blue window frames. Its design is inspired by the Basilica of St. Paul Outside the Walls in Rome. The interior is noted for its colorful stained glass windows and the glass-encased, venerated image of St. Joseph in the adjacent miraculous shrine.

== Administration and location ==
St. Antony's Church is a Catholic Latin Church forane (diocesan) parish under the jurisdiction of the Diocese of Cochin. It is situated in the village of Kannamaly, a narrow strip of land bordered by the Arabian Sea to the west and the Kannamaly backwaters (kayal) to the east. The village is located near Chellanam in the Ernakulam district and comes under the Kochi taluk.

== Gallery ==
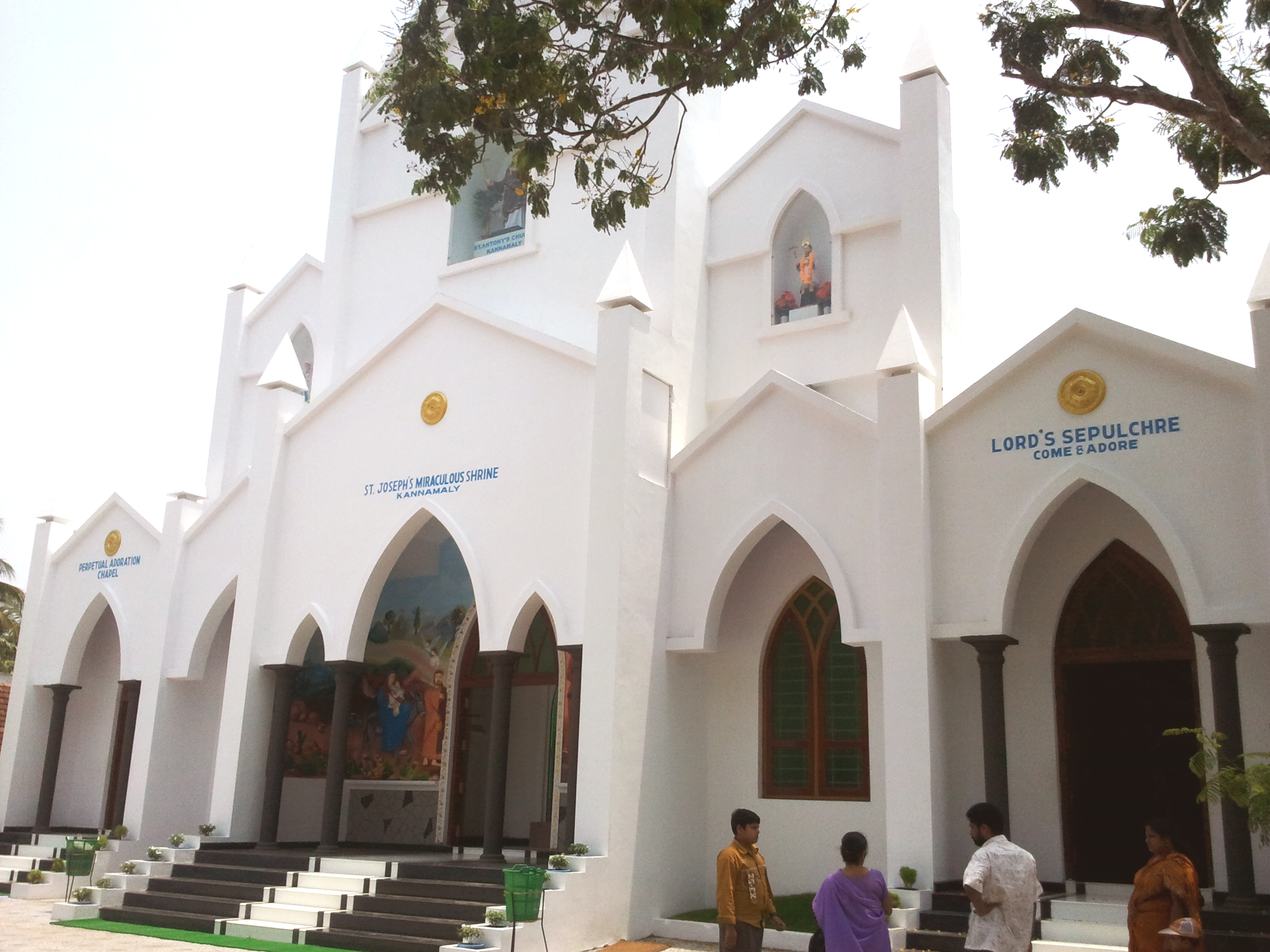
Forane Church Kannamaly

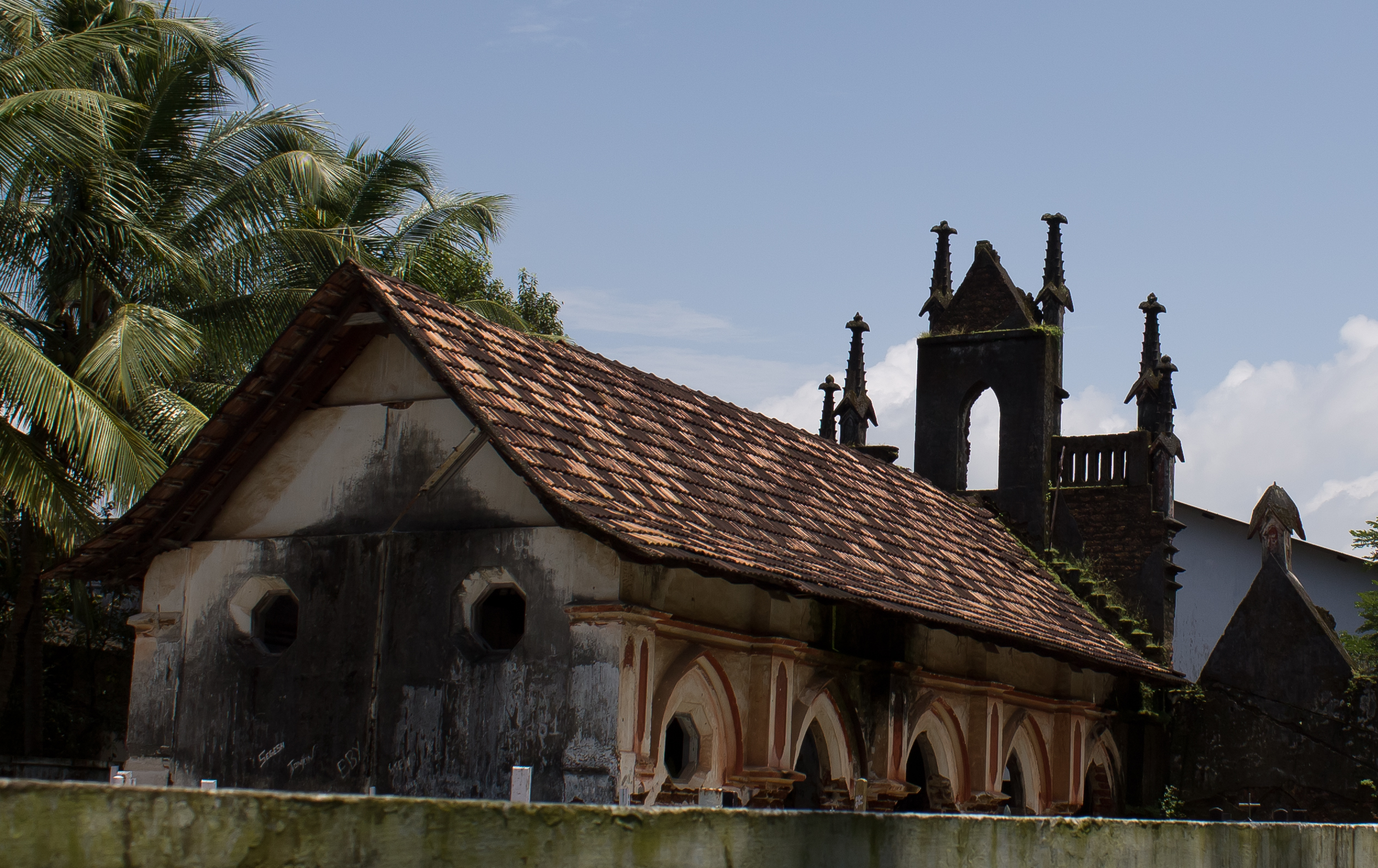
Old Church

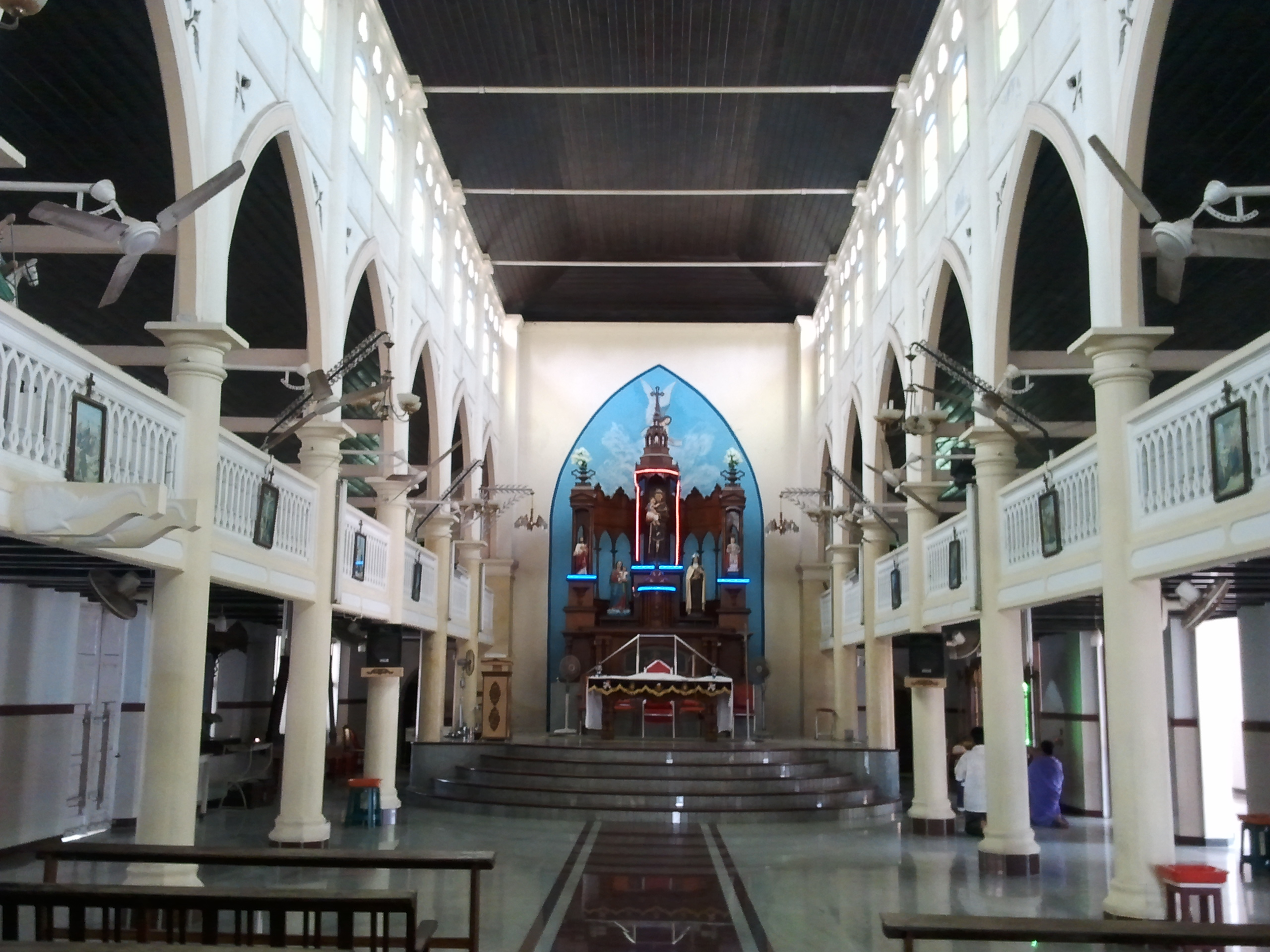
Interior View of The church

== See also ==
- Christianity in Kerala
- St Louis Church, Mundamveli

== Bibliography ==
- S, Priyadershini (18 March 2015). "A thousand kilos of curry". The Hindu. ISSN 0971-751X.
- "Church History". St. Antony's Church & St. Joseph's Miraculous Shrine.
- "Kannamaly Grama Panchayat". Local Self Government Department, Kerala Government.
