= Lawrence Puliyanath =

Indian Catholic priest

- Msgr Lawrence Puliyanath
- Born: 8 August 1898; Mundamveli
- Died: 20 February 1961
- Honored in: Roman Catholic Church
- Major shrine: St Lawrence Church Edacochin

Lawrence Puliyanath, occasionally known as Lawrence of Edakochi (8 August 1898 – 20 February 1961), was a Catholic priest of the Roman Catholic Diocese of Cochin, declared a Servant of God.

He was born in Mundamveli, Kochi, Kerala, India, and was a member of St Louis Church, Mundamveli.

He joined the Diocese of Cochin, and completed his formation at the Papal Seminary, Kandy; he was ordained in 1926. He was later professor of philosophy in Alappuzha Seminary and at the same time co-vicar in St. Lawrence Church, Edacochin, where he became known as the apostle of the poor. He declined the offer of the title of Bishop of Cochin. He died in 1961 and was buried in St. Lawrence Church, Edakochi. He was declared Servant of God (the first stage towards canonisation) by Bishop Joseph Kariyil and is venerated locally. There is a small museum dedicated to him adjacent to the church.
