= Church of Our Lady of Life =

Roman Catholic church in Kerala, India

Our Lady of Life Church Mattancherry - Roman Catholic church in Kerala
- ജീവമാത ചർച്ച് മട്ടാഞ്ചേരി
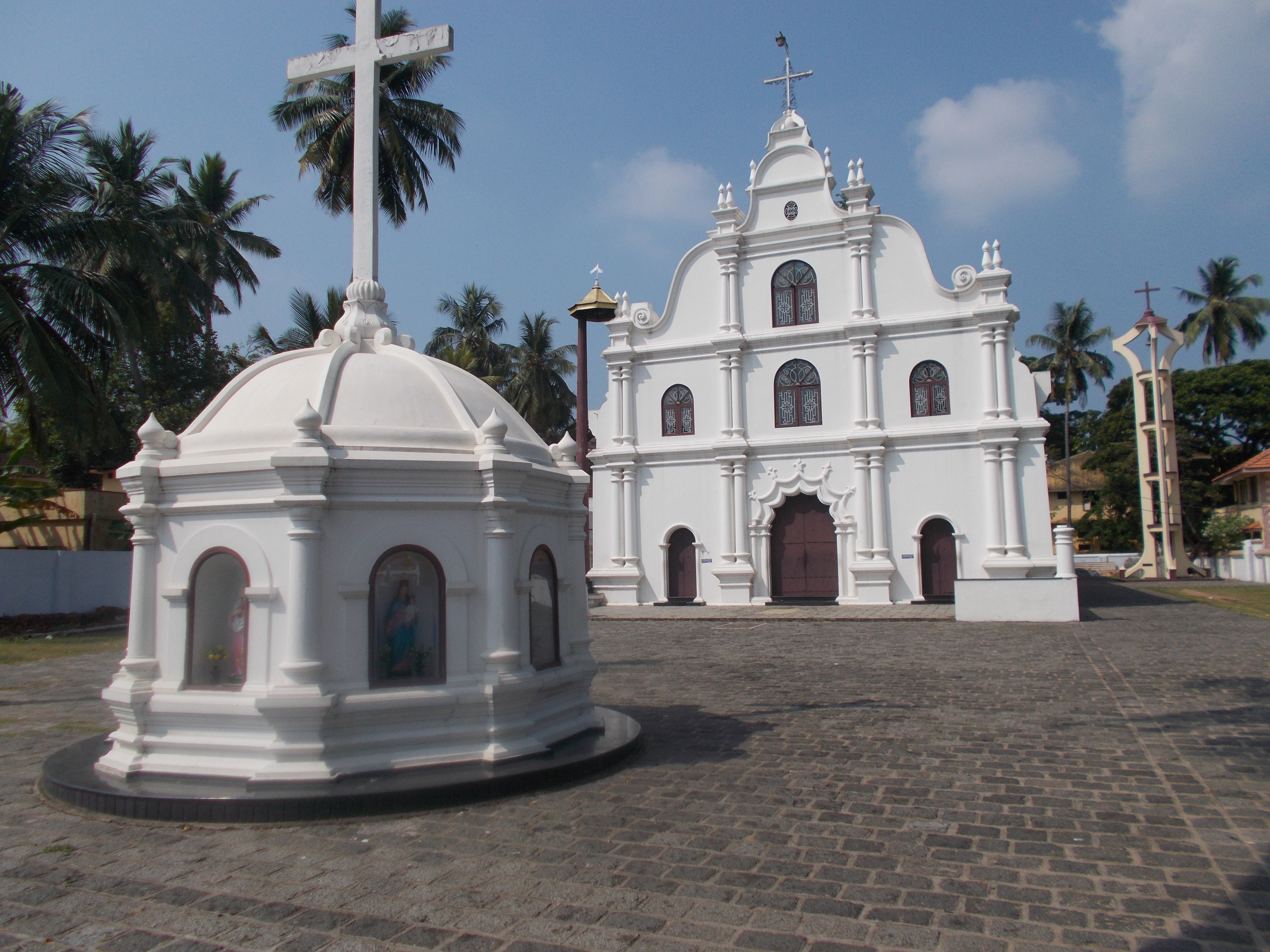
- Our Lady of Life Church Mattancherry - Roman Catholic church in Kerala
- 9.9613°N 76.2581°E
- Location: Kerala
- Country: India
- Language(s): Malayalam, English

History
- Status: Roman Catholic Church
- Founded: AD 1600
- Dedication: Our Lady Of Life

Architecture
- Functional status: active
- Style: Baroque Architecture

Administration
- District: Ernakulam
- Province: Verapoly
- Diocese: Roman Catholic Diocese of Cochin

Clergy
- Bishop: Antony Kattiparambil
- Vicar: Rev. Fr Jacob Kayala

Our Lady of Life Church (Portuguese: Igreja da Nossa Senhora da Vida is a Roman Catholic Church in Ernakulam district, Mattancherry, Kerala, India. It was built in the 16th-century and practices under the Roman Catholic Diocese of Cochin.

== Gallery ==
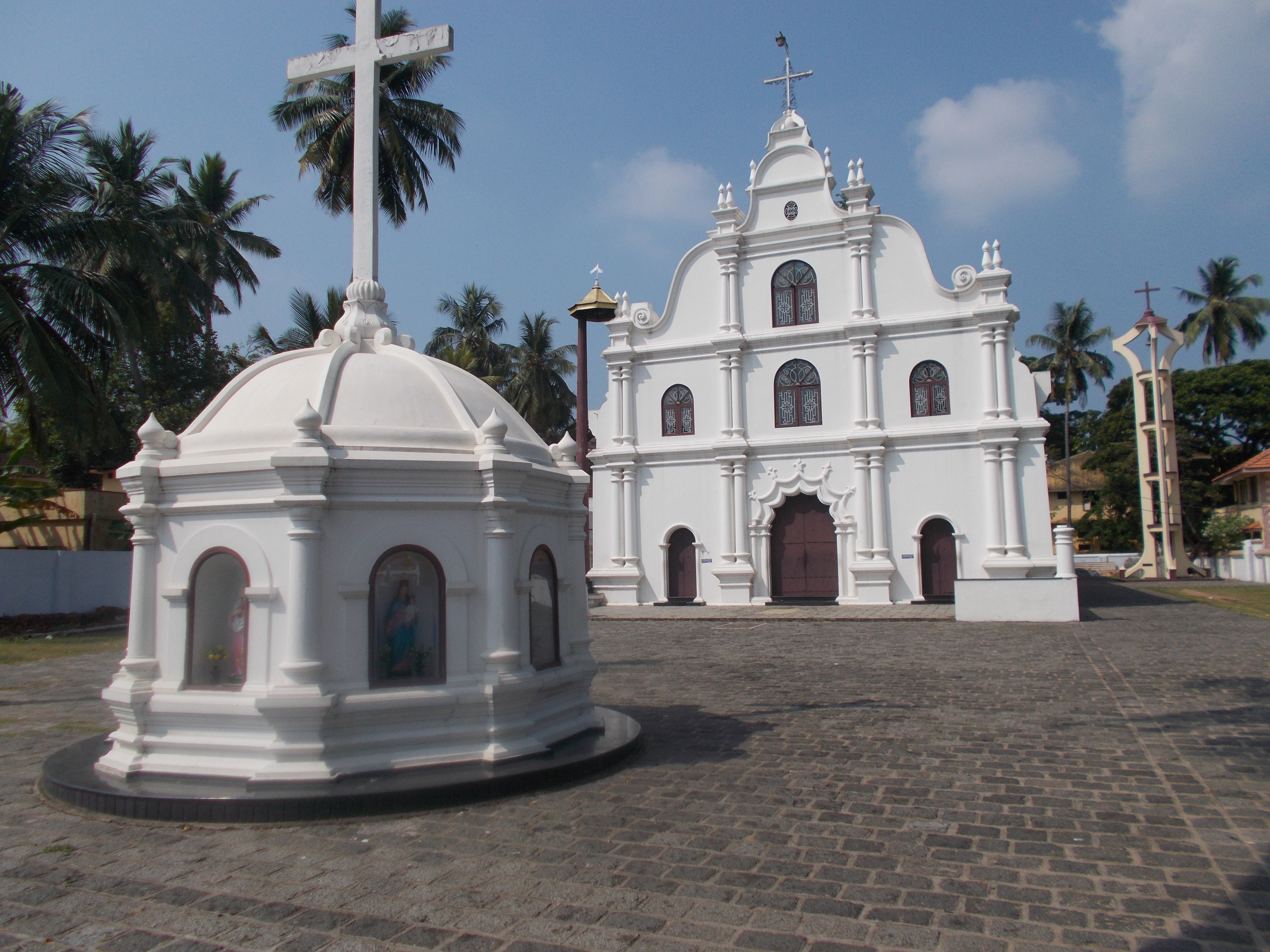
Front View

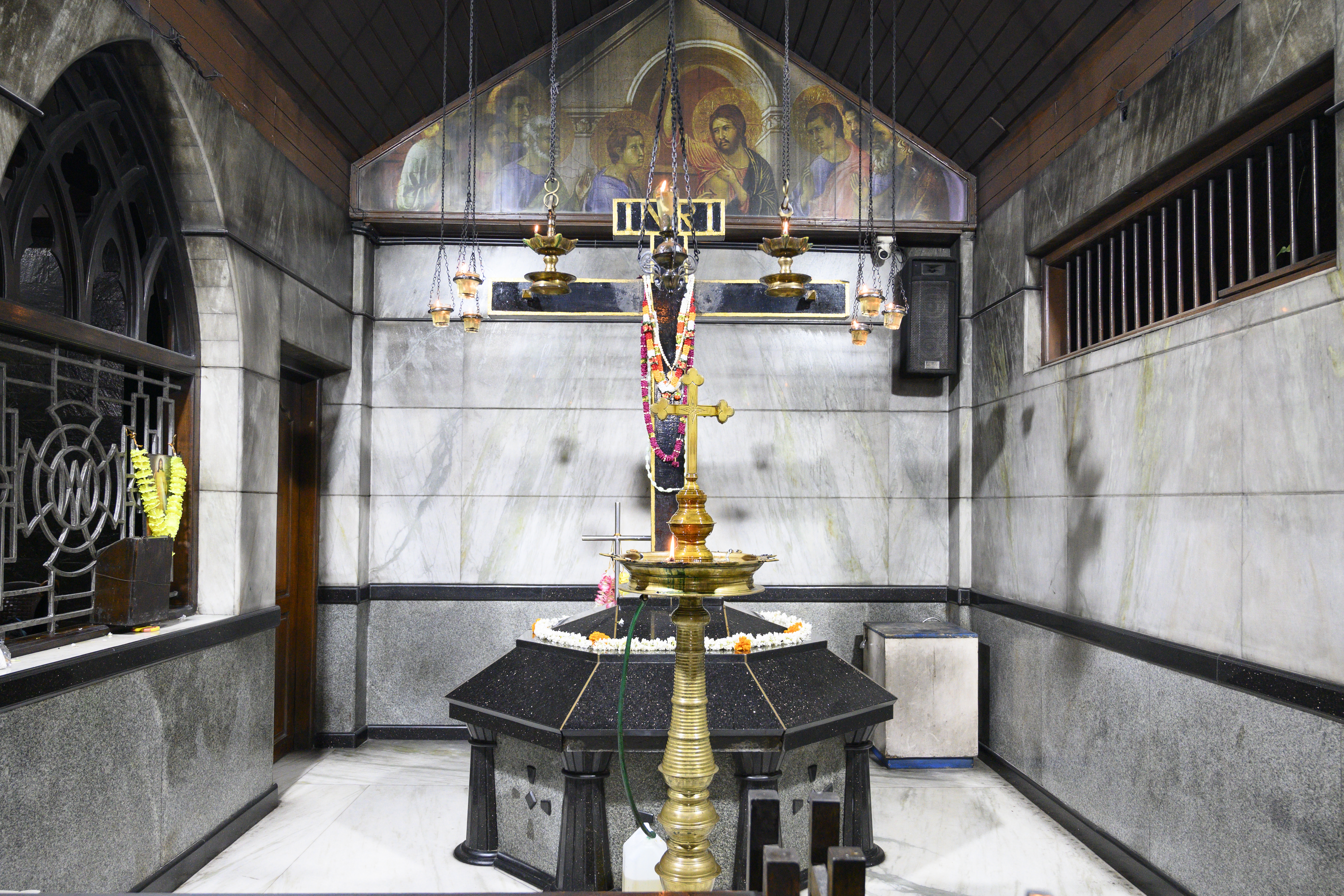
Kuriachan

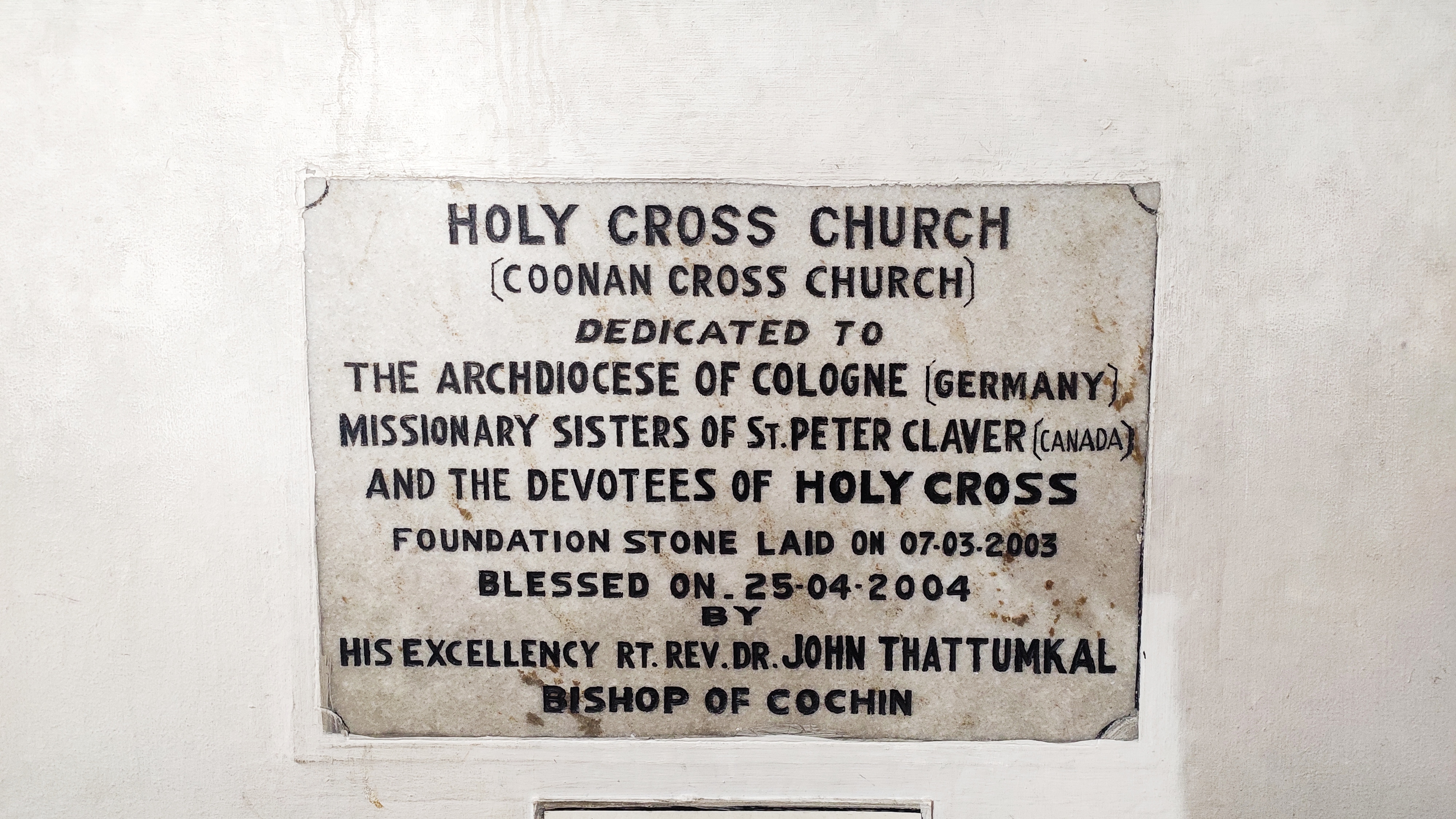
Inscription at Holy Cross Church
