= Church of Our Lady of Hope =

Church of Our Lady of Hope, Vypeen
- Igreja de Nossa Senhora da Esperança, Vaipim (Portuguese)
- Eccleasia de domina spei, Vypeen (Latin)
- പ്രത്യാശ മാതാ പള്ളി വൈപ്പിൻ
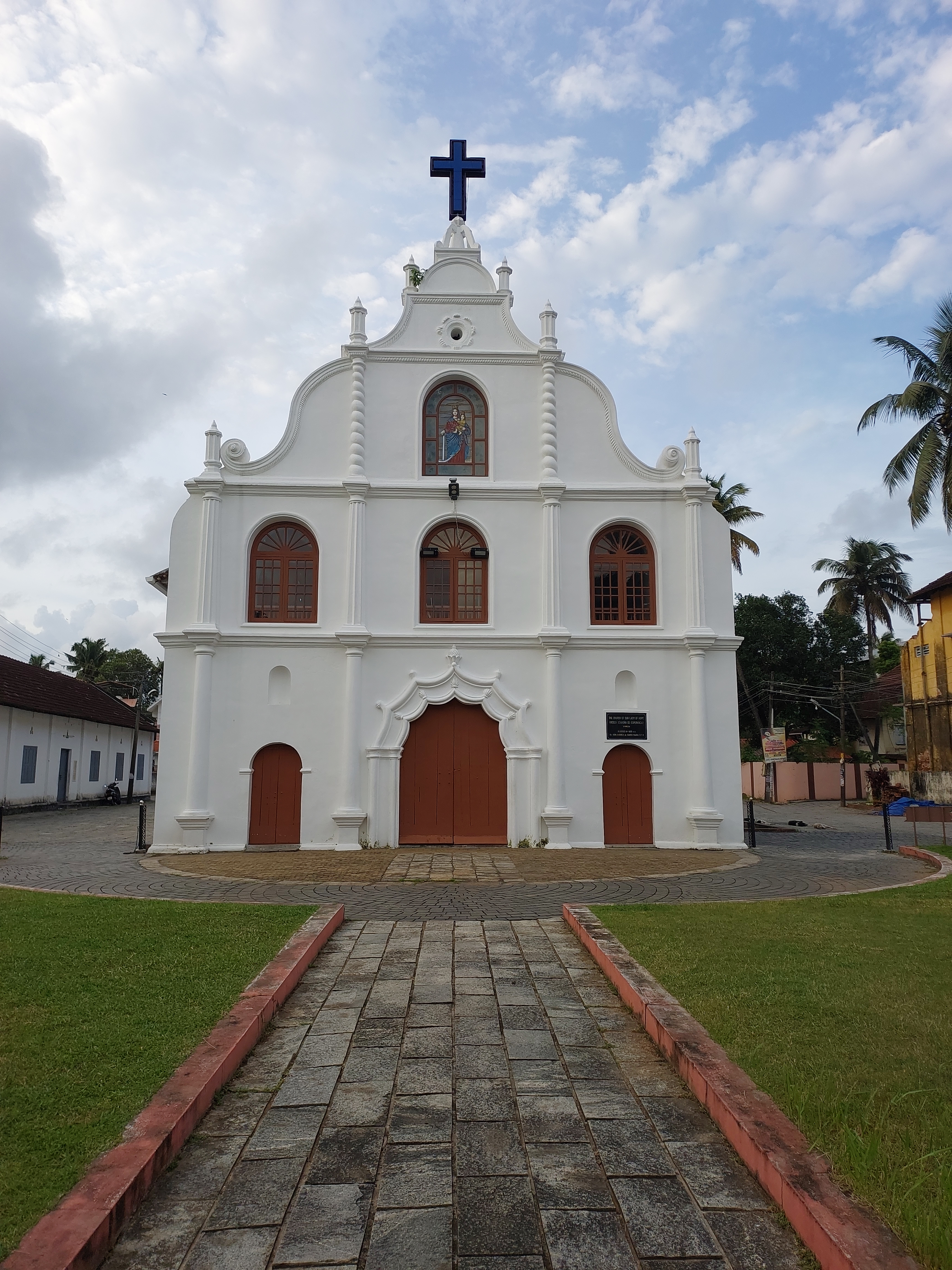
- Front of the church

- Location within Kerala
- 9.9737°N 76.2429°E
- Location: Fort Vypin, Vypin, Kochi, Kerala, India
- Denomination: Roman Catholic Church
- Website: Our Lady of Hope, Diocese of Cochin

History
- Former name: Capela de Nossa Senhora da Esperança
- Founded: 1605 AD
- Dedication: Virgin Mary

Architecture
- Style: Gothic

Administration
- District: Ernakulam
- Diocese: Diocese of Cochin
- Parish: Our Lady of Hope Parish

Clergy
- Bishop: Antony Kattiparambil
- Priest: Rev. Fr Meltas Chacko Kollashery

Church of Our Lady of Hope (Malayalam: പ്രത്യാശ മാതാ പള്ളി, Portuguese Church, in local usage - പറങ്കി പള്ളി) is a Latin Church parish in the Diocese of Cochin. It is located at Fort Vypin in the island of Vypeen, the point where the Vembanad Lake merges with the Arabian Sea, with Fort Cochin on the other side.The church, with an area of 10 km^{2} (3.9 sq mi), occupies the southern end of Vypeen Island. Ministering to Latin Catholics of Malabar, its liturgies are according to the Roman Rite of the Catholic Church. The patron of the church is Our Lady of Hope a form in which Virgin mary is venerated as the patron of fishermen and navigators. The emblem of church is an anchor. It is one of the oldest churches in Kochi, built by the Portuguese in 1605 A.D. It is part of the Diocese of Cochin.

Ecce Homo:

The six-foot-tall statue of Ecce Homo (translated roughly as "Behold the Man"), carved on a single piece of rosewood, is a relic that has been preserved in the church for more than 400 years. It is a bruised and beaten embodiment of Jesus Christ, wrapped in a velvet cloak and venerated on the fourth Sunday of Lent. It was given to the church by the captain of a passing Portuguese vessel on its way to Macau.

== Brief history ==
Foundation plaque of Lady of Hope Church

Built by Portuguese missionaries and consecrated in 1605 by Bishop Dom Andrea de Santa Maria. The building features Portuguese architectural influence.

== See also ==
- Archdiocese of Goa
- Christianity in India
- Roman Catholicism in India
- List of Roman Catholic dioceses in India
- List of Roman Catholic dioceses (structured_view)-Episcopal Conference of India
