= Antony Kattiparambil =

Indian Catholic prelate (born 1970)

Most. Rev. Dr. Antony Kattiparambil
- 36th Bishop of Cochin
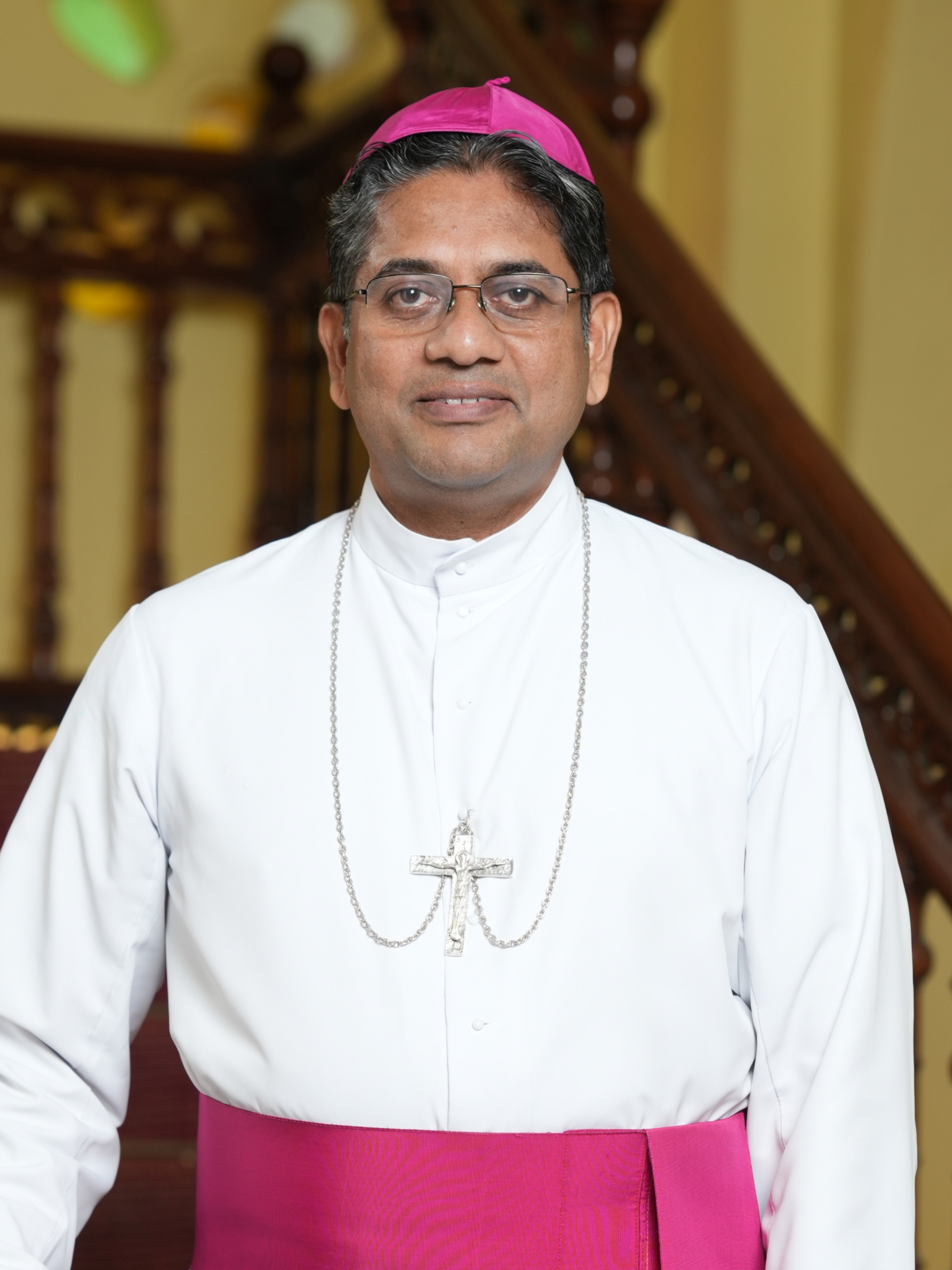
- Church: Catholic
- Diocese: Cochin
- Appointed: 25 October 2025
- Predecessor: Joseph Kariyil
- Previous posts: Judicial Vicar; Episcopal Vicar for Religious

Orders
- Ordination: 15 August 1998 by Joseph Kureethara
- Consecration: 7 December 2025 by Filipe Neri Ferrão

Personal details
- Born: 14 October 1970 (age 56) Mundamveli, Kochi, India
- Residence: Bishop's House Bp Joseph Kureethara Road, P.B. No. 11
- Education: St. Joseph Pontifical Seminary, Alwaye; Pontifical Urbaniana University, Rome
- Motto: Gratia Dei Sum Id Quod Sum (Latin for 'By the grace of God, I am what I am')
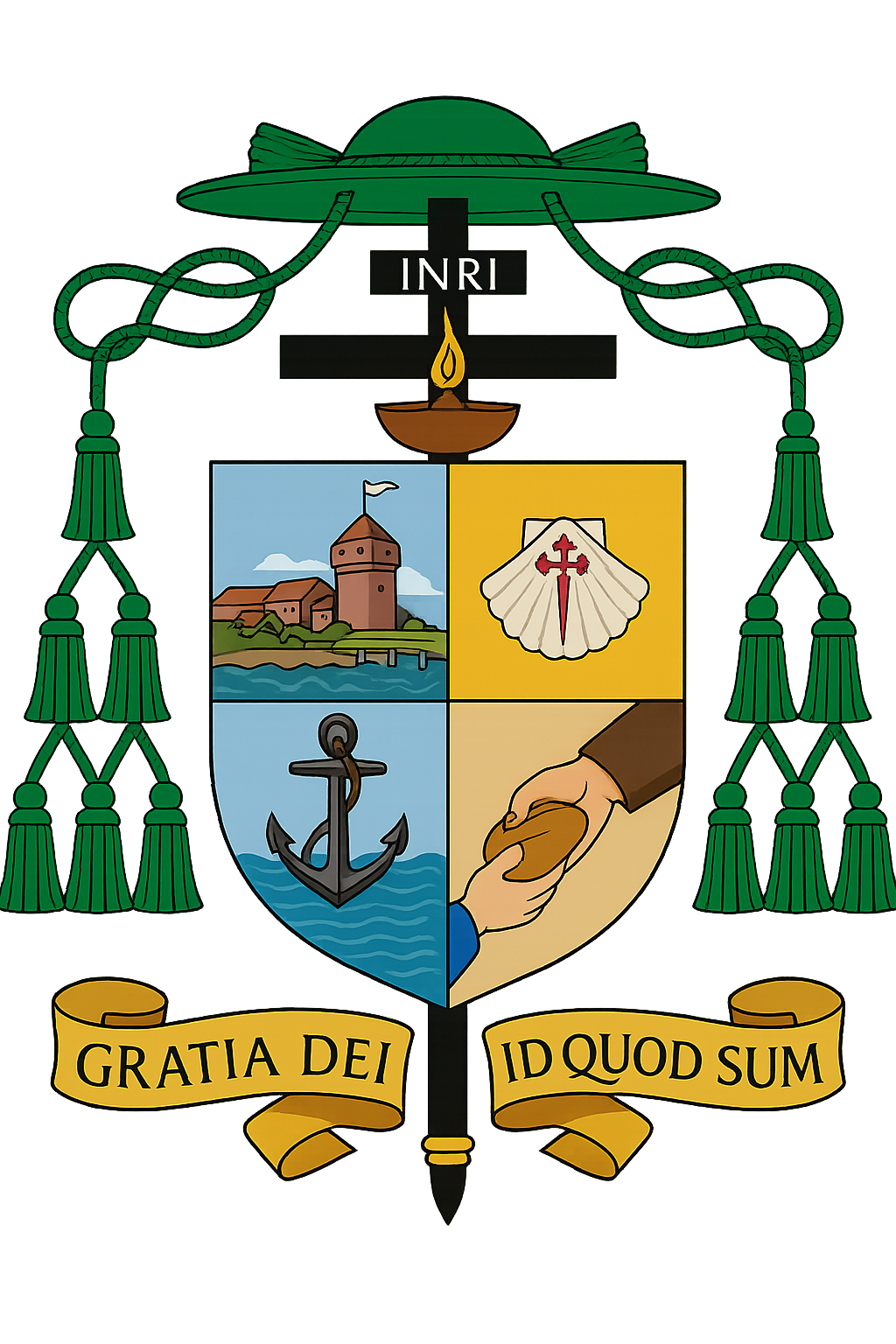
- Coat of arms: Antony Kattiparambil's coat of arms

Ordination history
History
Priestly ordination
- Ordained by: Joseph Kureethara
Episcopal consecration
- Principal consecrator: Filipe Neri Ferrão
- Co-consecrators: Joseph Kalathiparambil, Joseph Kariyil

Styles of Antony Kattiprambil
- Reference style: His Grace; The Most Reverend; The Right Reverend
- Spoken style: Your Grace
- Religious style: Bishop

Antony Kattiparambil (born 14 October 1970) is an Indian prelate of the Catholic Church serving as the bishop of the Diocese of Cochin from October 2025.

== Biography ==
Antony Kattiparambil was born on 14 October 1970 in Mundamveli, Kochi as the son of the Jacob and Treesa Kattiparambil and the youngest among seven siblings. He began his priestly formation at Mount Carmel Petit Seminary, Fort Kochi, in 1986 and pursued philosophical studies at St. Joseph Pontifical Seminary, Alwaye (1990–1993). Later, he moved to Rome for theological formation at the Collegio Urbano and was ordained a priest on 15 August 1998, by then Bishop Joseph Kureethara. He holds licentiates in Biblical Theology (1998) and Canon Law (2016) from the Università Urbaniana, Rome.

After his ordination, he served as an assistant parish priest at Santa Cruz Basilica, Fort Kochi (1998–2002), and St Sebastian's Church, Thoppumpady (2002). He later worked in Italy under various pastoral and academic roles, including at San Francesco, Prato, and San Pio V, Rome. He returned to India in 2016 as parish priest of St Martin's Church, Kallanchery, and since 2023 had been serving at St Joseph's Church, Kumbalam.

Within the diocese, he has held key responsibilities, including Judicial Vicar (since 2016), diocesan contact person for the Synod (2021–2023), and Episcopal Vicar for Religious (2023–2024).

== Priesthood ==
Kattiparambil was ordained as priest on 15 August 1998 for the Diocese of Cochin by Bishop Joseph Kureethara. During his 27 years of priestly ministry, he held various pastoral and administrative roles within the diocese and Italy,

His positions include:

Pastoral life

- 1998–2002 Assistant parish priest, Santa Cruz Cathedral Basilica, Fort Cochin
- 2002 Assistant parish priest, St Sebastian's Church, Thoppumpady
- 2002–2005 Assistant parish priest, Chiesa di San Francesco, Prato, Italy
- 2005–2010 Parish administrator, St Joseph Church, N. Kumbalanghi
- 2010–2013 Assistant parish priest, Sts. Sisino, Martirio e Alessandro, Brivio, Milan, Italy
- 2013–2016 Assistant parish priest, San Pio V, Rome, Italy
- 2016–2021 Parish priest, St Martin's Church, Kallancherry
- 2023–2025 Parish priest, St Joseph's Church, Kumbalam

Offices

- 2000–2002 Notary at Cochin Diocesan Marriage Tribunal, Fort Cochin
- 2002–2006 Assistant Director, Cochin E-Land Computer Studies, Perumpadappu
- 2002–2005 Director of IT Project in Italia, Multi-data, Prato, Italy
- 2016–2025 Judicial Vicar, Diocese of Cochin
- 2021–2023 Diocesan Organizer of the Synod
- 2023–2024 Episcopal Vicar for the Religious

== Episcopate ==
On 25 November, Pope Leo XIV appointed Kattiparambil as the bishop of the Diocese of Cochin, succeeding Joseph Kariyil. He was ordained as a bishop on 7 December 2025 and was installed as the Bishop of Cochin on 8 December 2025 at Santa Cruz Cathedral Basilica, Kochi.

== Arms ==
Coat of arms of Antony Kattiparambil
Notes The coat of arms was designed by Fr Febin Rebello and adopted when he was appointed as the Bishop of Cochin. Adopted 7 December 2025 Escutcheon Coonan Cross Mattancherry,First Santa Cruz Cathedral Basilica of 1505,Scallop of Apostle Jacob, Bread of St Antony, Anchor and Waves Motto Gratia Dei Sum Id Quod Sum (Latin for 'By the grace of God, I am what I am') Symbolism Coonan Cross: symbolises historical Coonan Cross Oath of 1653 at Mattancherry; First Cathedral: The historic Santa Cruz Cathedral Basilica built on 1505; Scallop of Apostle Jacob: St Jacob of St Louis Church, Mundamveli.; Bread of St Antony: stands for his patron saint.; Anchor and Waves: stands for Church of Our Lady of Hope in Fort Vypeen.

== See also ==
- Catholic Church in India
- Hierarchy of the Catholic Church
- List of Catholic bishops in India
- Lists of popes, patriarchs, primates, archbishops, and bishops

Catholic Church titles
Preceded by Joseph Kariyil	Bishop of Cochin; 2025–present	Succeeded by Incumbent
