= Diocese of Cochin =

Latin Catholic diocese in India

Diocese of Cochin Diœcesis Coccinensis കൊച്ചി രൂപത
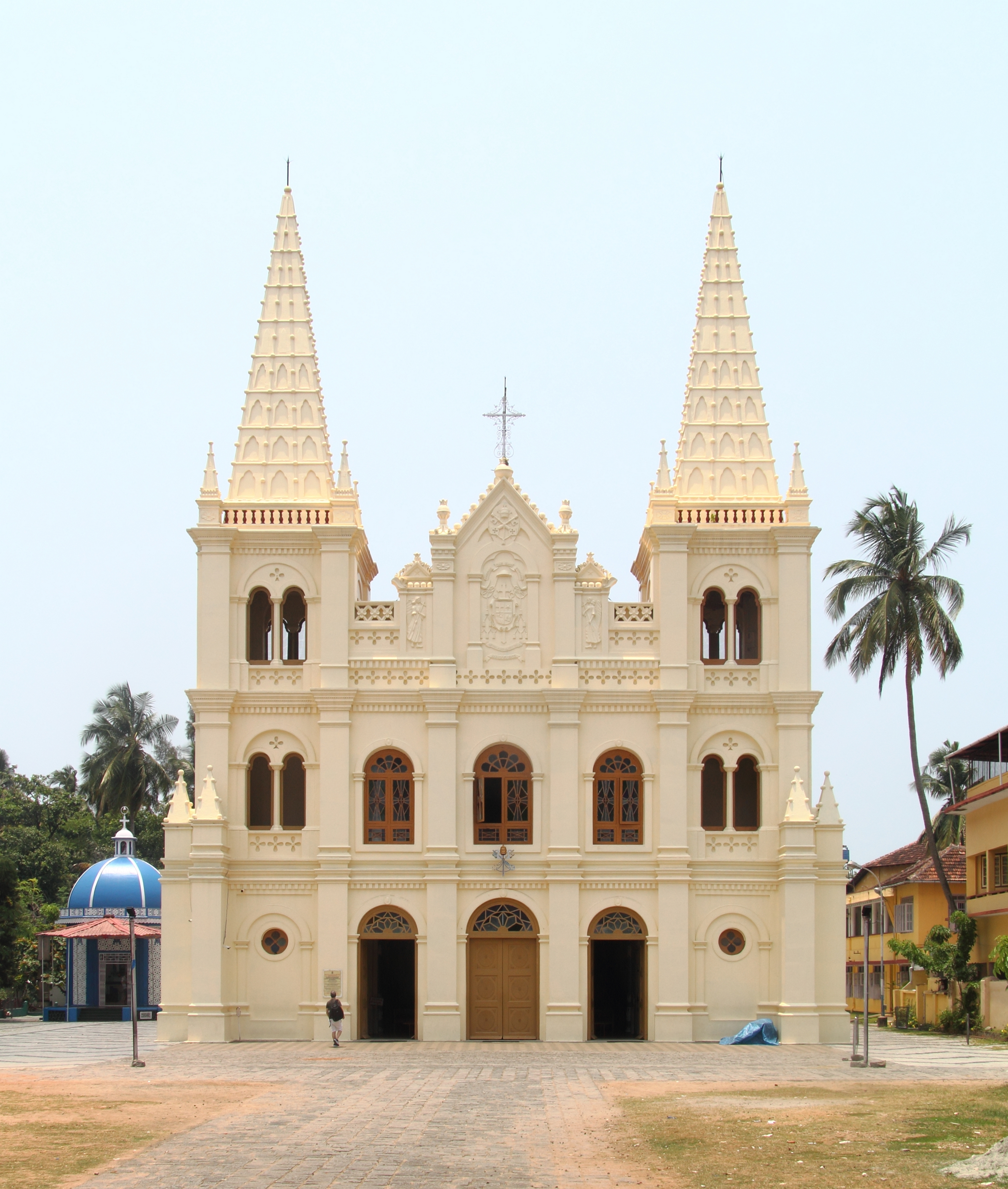
- Santa Cruz Cathedral Basilica, Kochi

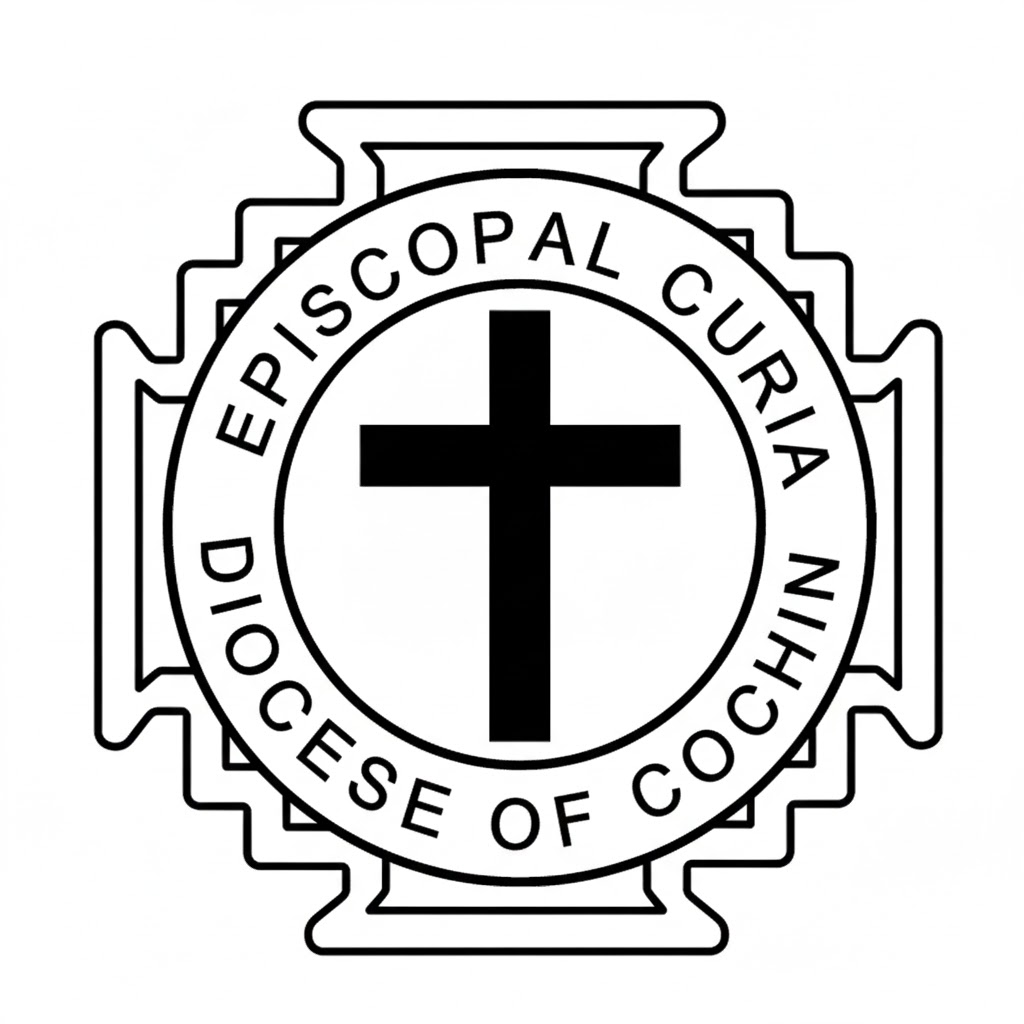
- Coat of arms

Location
- Country: India
- Episcopal conference: Conference of Catholic Bishops of India; Catholic Bishops' Conference of India; Kerala Catholic Bishop's Council
- Ecclesiastical region: Kerala
- Ecclesiastical province: Verapoly
- Deaneries: 6
- Headquarters: Fort Kochi, Kerala
- Coordinates: 9°57′53″N 76°14′34″E

Statistics
- Area: 236 km^{2} (91 sq mi)
- Population: Total; Catholics: (as of 2021); 625,500 (Note: Annuario Pontificio (2022) via Catholic-Hierarchy.org); 182,324 (Note: (2022) via Catholic-Hierarchy.org) (28.2%)
- Parishes: 51

Information
- Denomination: Catholic Church
- Sui iuris church: Latin Church
- Rite: Roman Rite
- Established: 4 February 1557; 469 years ago
- Cathedral: Santa Cruz Cathedral Basilica, Fort Cochin
- Patron saint: Holy Cross; St Francis Xavier
- Secular priests: 166 Diocesan Priests 116 Religious Priests 545 Religious Sisters
- Language: Malayalam; English; Portuguese

Current leadership
- Pope: Leo XIV
- Bishop: Antony Kattiparambil
- Metropolitan Archbishop: Joseph Kalathiparambil
- Vicar General: Very Rev Msgr Josy Kandanattuthara
- Episcopal Vicars: Very Rev Fr Francis Xavier Kalathiveetil; Very Rev Fr Tomy Chambakkatt; Very Rev Fr Johny Xavier Puthukattu
- Judicial Vicar: Joshy George Alesseril
- Bishops emeritus: Joseph Kariyil; John Thattumkal

Website
- dioceseofcochin.org

The Diocese of Cochin (Latin: Diœcesis Coccinensis) is a Latin Church diocese of the Catholic Church in Cochin, Kerala, India. A constituent of the sui iuris Latin Church, the diocese was established in 1557 after the domination of the Portuguese-speaking missionaries. The diocese is a suffragan diocese in the ecclesiastical province of the metropolitan Archdiocese of Verapoly. According to Annuario Pontificio 2025, Diocese of Cochin is the first diocese of Kerala

The diocese is situated with the Arabian Sea in the west, the Archdiocese of Verapoly in both north and east, and the Diocese of Alleppey in the south. The Santa Cruz Cathedral Basilica in Fort Cochin is the diocese's cathedral where the Diocesan Administrator resides. Pope Francis appointed James Raphael Anaparambil, Bishop of Diocese of Alleppey, as apostolic administrator sede plena to the diocese on 11 October 2024 and his term has ended on 8 December by the installation of Antony Kattiparambil as the Bishop of Cochin.

On 25 October 2025, Pope Leo XIV appointed Antony Kattiparambil as the bishop of the diocese.

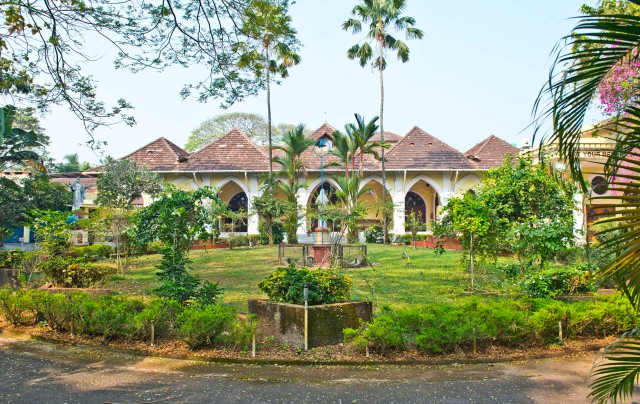

== History ==
Date	Event	From	To
4 February 1557	Erected	Archdiocese of Goa	Diocese of Cochin was erected as a suffragan diocese (other being Diocese of Malacca) to the Archdiocese of Goa
1599	Territory Lost	Diocese of Cochin	Archdiocese of Angamalé (erected) (Later name changed to Archdiocese of Cranganore and suppressed to Vicariate Apostolic of Verapoly)
9 January 1606	Territory Lost	Diocese of Cochin	Dioceses of Saint Thomas of Mylapore (Tamil Nadu) United To: Archdiocese of Madras and Mylapore (Meliapor)
1606	Territory Lost	Diocese of Cochin	as Mission "sui iuris" of Madura (Tamil Nadu) Later Suppressed.
1659	Territory Lost	Diocese of Cochin	Vicariate Apostolic of Malabar (erected) (Later namechanged to Vicariate Apostolic of Verapoly and Later to Archdiocese of Verapoly)
3 Dec 1834	Territory Lost	Diocese of Cochin	Vicariate Apostolic of Ceylon (Sri Lanka) Later changed to Archdiocese of Colombo
19 June 1952	Territory Lost	Diocese of Cochin	Diocese of Alleppey (erected)
19 September 1953	Metropolitan Changed	Archdiocese of Goa	Archdiocese of Verapoly
1955	Territory Lost	Diocese of Cochin	Diocese of Trivandrum

The early Christian missionaries arrived in India from Portugal in 1550, pioneering the Portuguese mission in the country. Subsequently, the Christians of Kochi began practicing the Latin liturgical rite. St. Francis Xavier often visited the land of Kochi, where he offered holy mass at the St. Francis Church, in which lies the body of Vasco da Gama buried in 1524. The Order of the Franciscans built a monastery in 1518 and two more, of the Jesuit Order, in 1550 and 1561. In 1553 the Dominicans sisters started a college and Monastery in Kochi, and before 1557, publication began and book printing began in Kochi. The Society of Jesus was then founded by Father Balthazar Gago, S.J. in 1550 and in 1560, the King of Portugal built for the Society of Jesus, the college of Kochi, and in 1562, a novitiate of the Society was established there. Following the rising of the land, Pope Leo X, in 1514 erected the Diocese of Funchal, and in 1534, the Diocese of Goa which was joined by the people in Kochi. The diocese of Cochin was elected by Pope Paul IV on 4 February 1557, in his decree "Pro Excellenti Praeeminentia" for the two new suffragan dioceses (the other being Diocese of Malacca).

The Papal Bull of Pope Paul IV, which was used earlier in erecting the diocese was also utilised in raising the collegiate church of the Holy Cross, and the parish church of Cochin to a cathedral of the diocese with the first Bishop of Cochin, a Dominican Father Jorge Tremudo. In 1577, Brother João Gonsalves, S.J. was engraved at Cochin for the first time, thus, outlined the first Malealam book Outlines of Christian Doctrine, which was written in Portuguese by St. Francis Xavier to aid children. Cochin was taken on 6 January 1663, by the Dutch after a siege of six months. The city was reduced in size; the clergy were expelled; the monasteries and colleges, bishop's palace, etc., were razed to the ground. The church of St. Francis of Assisi, belonging to the Franciscan monastery was spared by the conquerors and converted for their religious use. After the English overthrew the Dutch, they kept the church which was turned into a merchandise to serve as a witness to the past four centuries, as well as an existing oldest church in India.

== Notable ordinaries ==
Sl.no	Ordinary	Year of appointment	Last year of service
1	Dom Jorge Temudo O.P	1557	1567
28	Dom Mateus de Oliveira Xavier	1898	1908
31	Dom José Vieira Alvernaz	1942	1951
32	Alexander Edezhath	1952	1975
33	Joseph Kureethara	1975	1999
34	John Thattumkal	2000	2008
35	Joseph Kariyil	2009	2024
36	Antony Kattiparambil	2025	Present

== Parishes ==
The Diocese Of Cochin has fifty one independent parishes with resident priests under six ecclesiastical districts as follows

Name Of The Parish	Year Established
First District – Fort Cochin Forane
Santa Cruz Cathedral Basilica Fort Kochi	1505
Church of Our Lady of Life Mattancherry	9th century
Church of Our Lady of Hope Fort Vypeen	1605
St Peter and Paul Church Amaravathy	1857
Holy Family Church Nazareth	1901
Stella Maris Church Willington Island	1955
St Joseph's Bethlehem Church Chullicakal	1974
St Mary's Church Kochery	2016
Second District – Kannamaly Forane
St Antony's Forane Church Kannamaly	1873
St Louis Church Mundamveli	9th century
St Sebastian's Church Chellaanam	1832
St Joseph's Church Cheriyakadavu	1968
St Francis Assisi Church Kaattiparambu	1980
St Thomas Apostle Church Santhome	1990
St John The Baptist Church Anjilithara	2019
Third District – Edakochi Forane
St Lawrence Church Edakochi	9th century
St Sebastian's Church Thoppumpady	1833
Santa Cruz Church Perumpadappu	1965
St Joseph's Church Chirackal	1965
St Mary's Church North Edakochi	1978
St Lawrence Church Palluruthy	1986
St Thomas More Church Palluruthy	1991
St Joseph's Church Maduracompany	2012
Santa Maria Church Perumpadappu	2018
Fourth District – Kumbalanghi Forane
St George Church Pazhangad	1869
St Peter's Church Kumbalanghi	1875
St Joseph's Church North Kumbalanghi	1967
Immaculate Conception Church Ezhupunna	1977
St Sebastian's Church Neendakara	1977
Sacred Heart Church Kumbalanghi	1994
St Martin De Porres Church Kallencherry	1996
Holy Maris Church Azheekakam	2014
San Jose Church Ettumkal	2014
Fifth District – Aroor Forane
St Augustine's Church Aroor	1901
St Francis Xavier Church Eramalloor	1843
St Joseph's Church Kumbalam	1977
St Antony's Church Arookutty	1978
St Joseph's Church Vallithod	1986
Our Lady Of Fatima Church Kodamthuruth	1991
St Mary's Church Chandiroor	2004
St Sebastian's Church Karunyapuram	2013
Little Flower Church Perumbalam	2013
St Jude Church Eramalloor	2020
Queen Of Peace Church Ezhupunna	2024
Sixth District – Thankey Forane
St Mary's Forane Church Thankey	1832
Our Lady Of Assumption Church, Poomkavu	1860
St George Church Arthumkal	1866
St Francis Xavier Church Vayalar	1936
St Sebastian's Church Areeparambu	2016
St George Church Arasupuram	2017
St Antony's Church Pathirapally	2019

In the 9th century there were only three parishes in Kochi:

St. Lawrence Church Edakochi,

Our Lady Of Life Church Mattancherry, and

St. Louis Church Mundamveli.

== Gallery ==
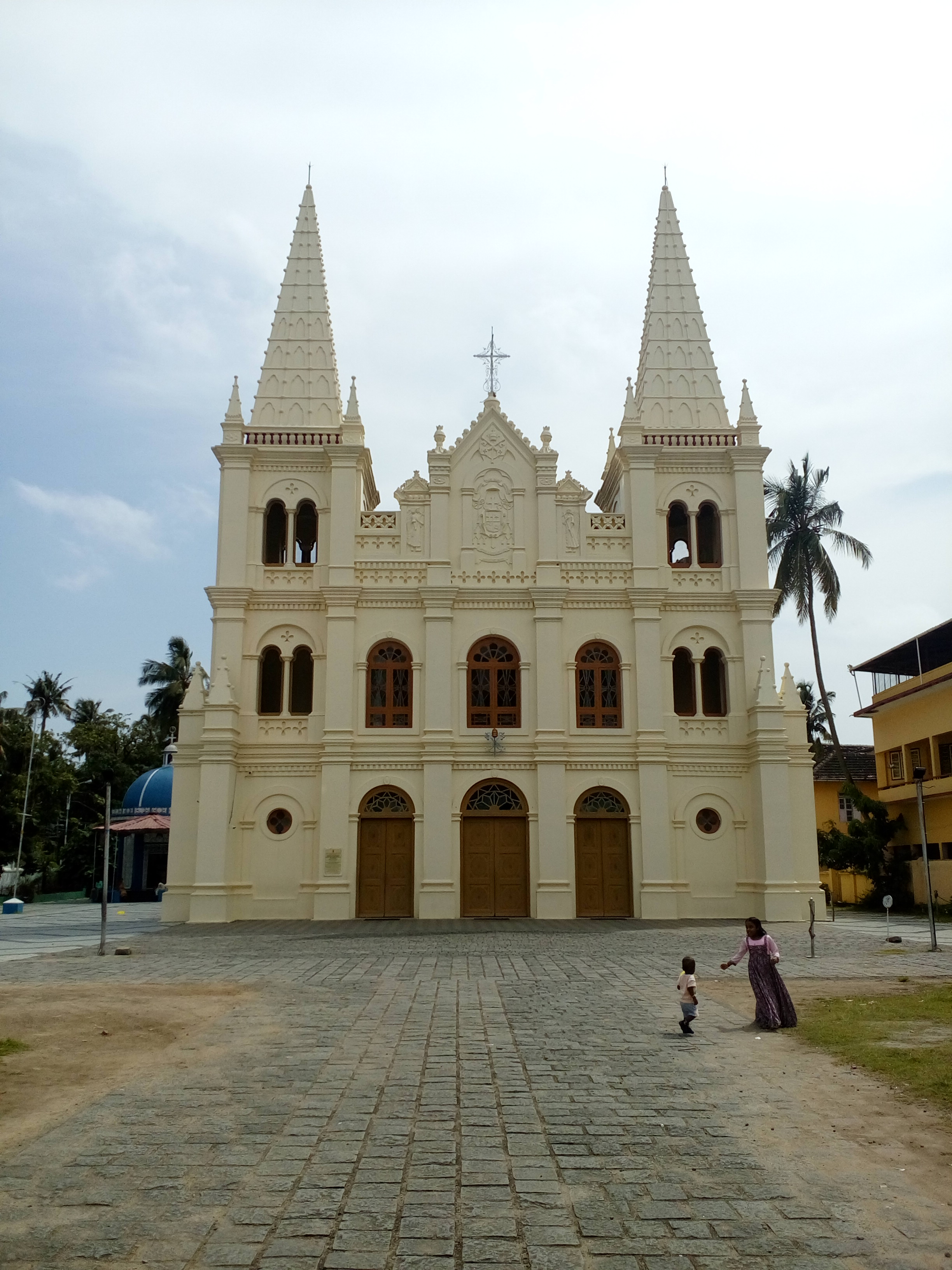
Santa Cruz Cathedral Basilica

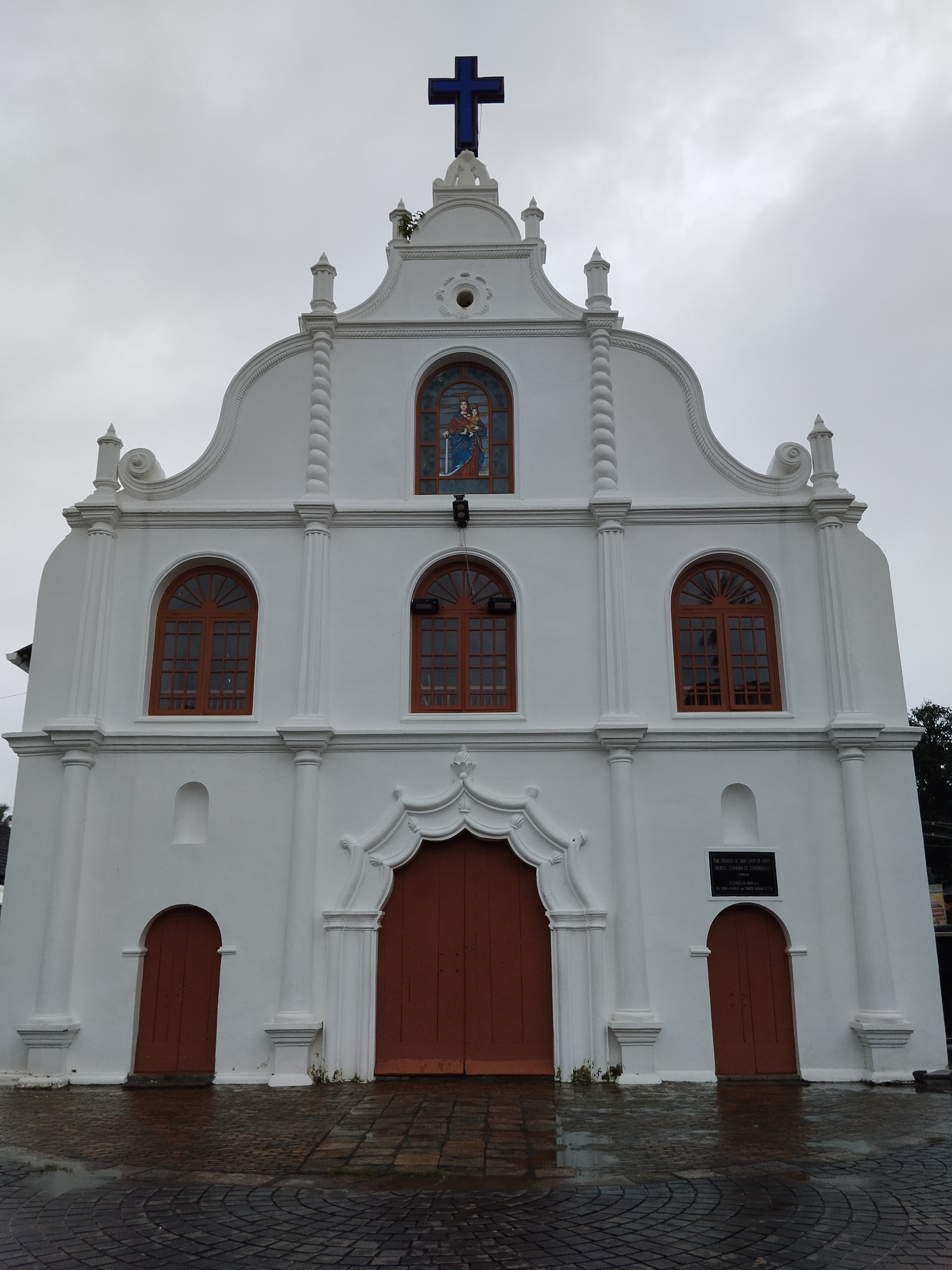
Church of Our Lady of HopeVypeen

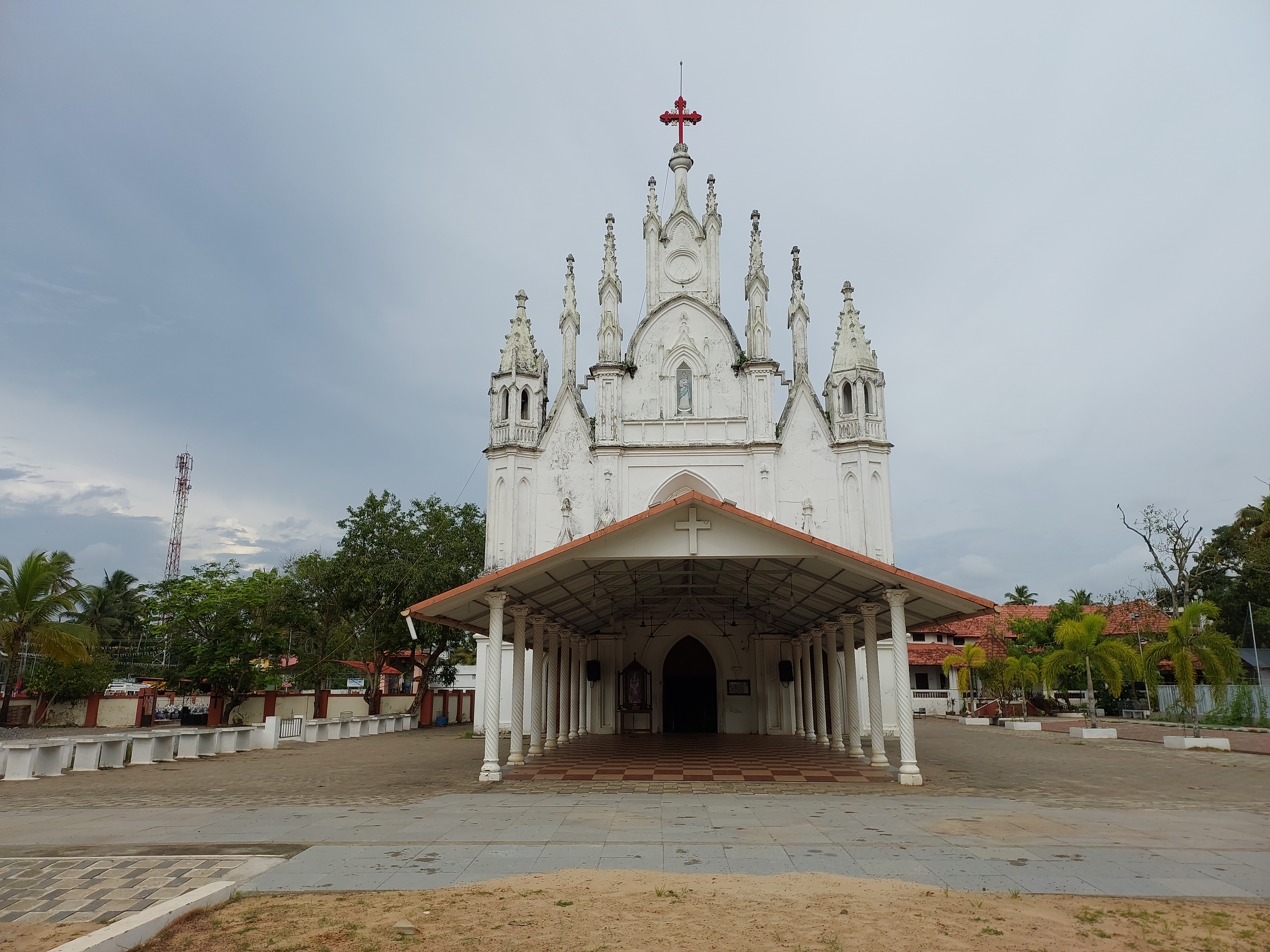
Thankey Church

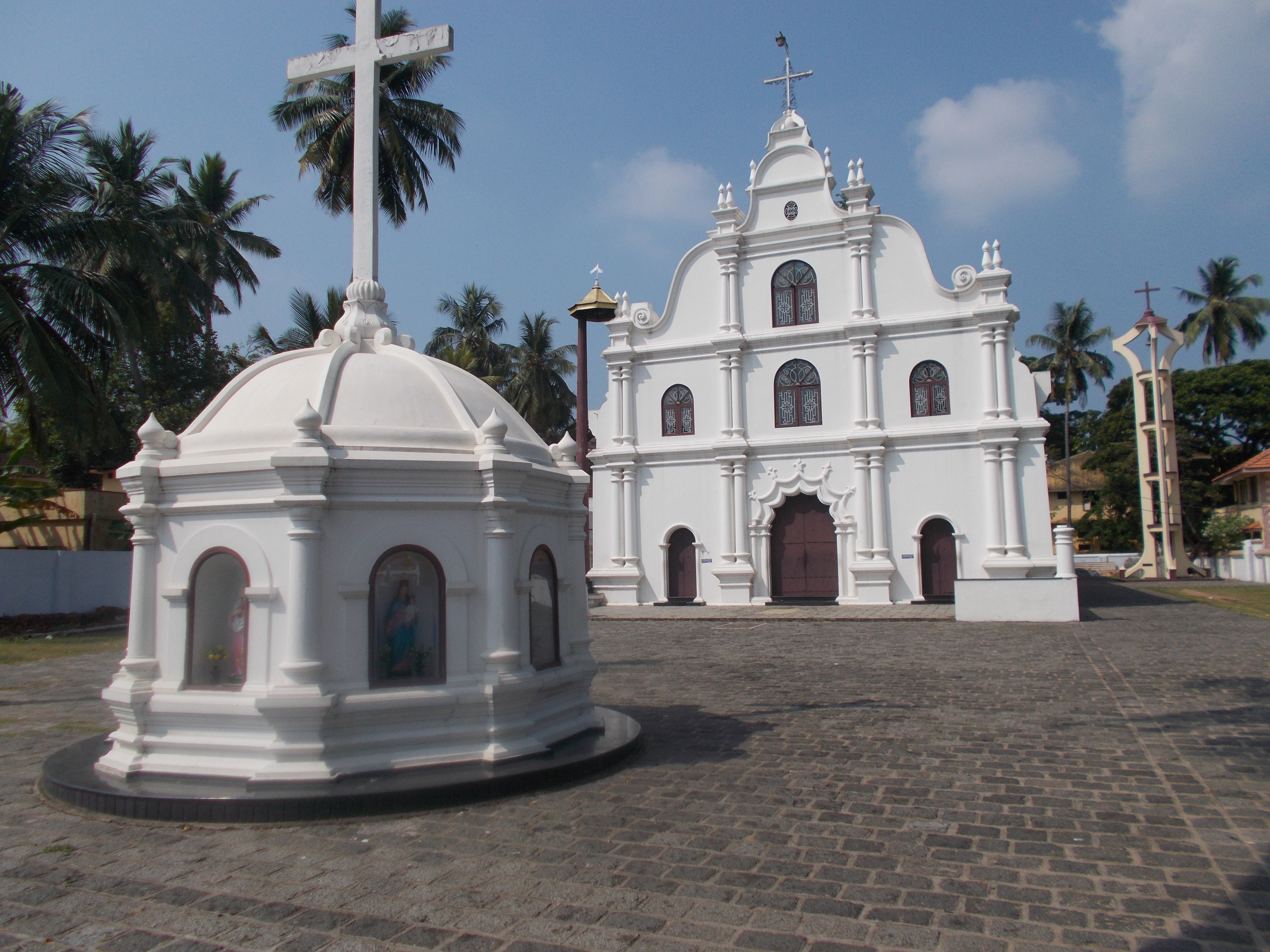
Church of Our Lady of Life

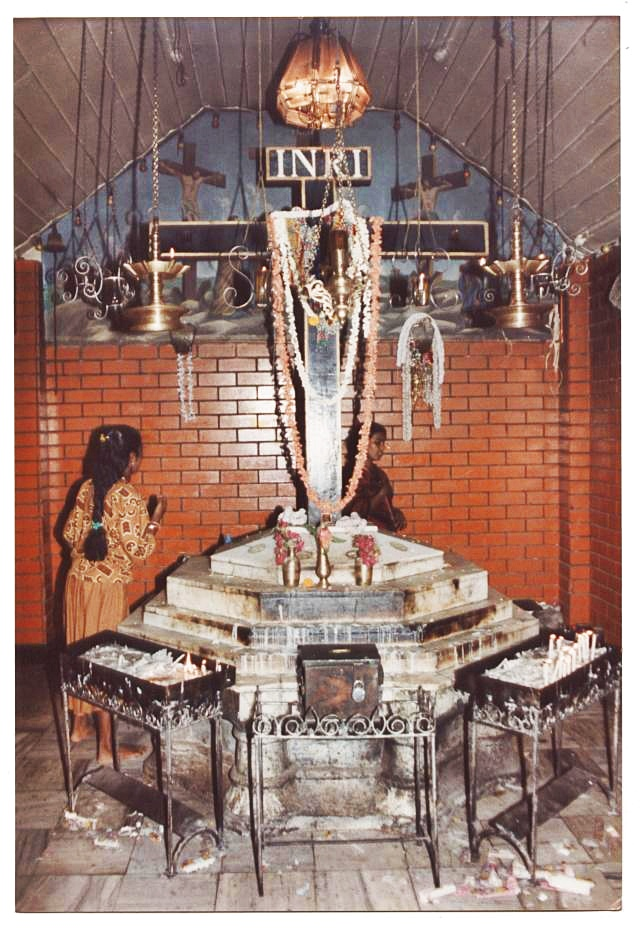
Holy Cross Church, Mattancherry

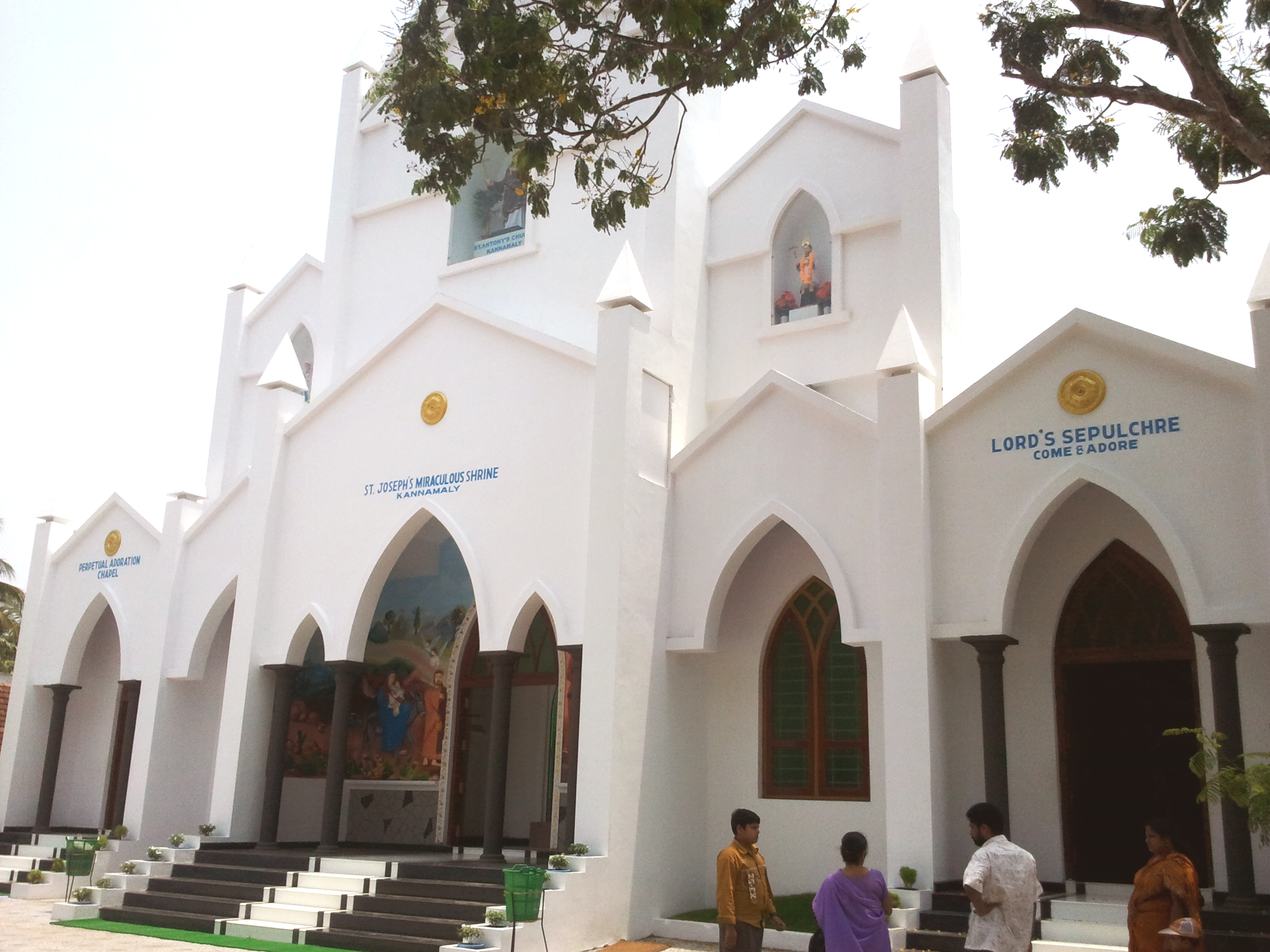
St Antony's Forane Church, Kannamaly

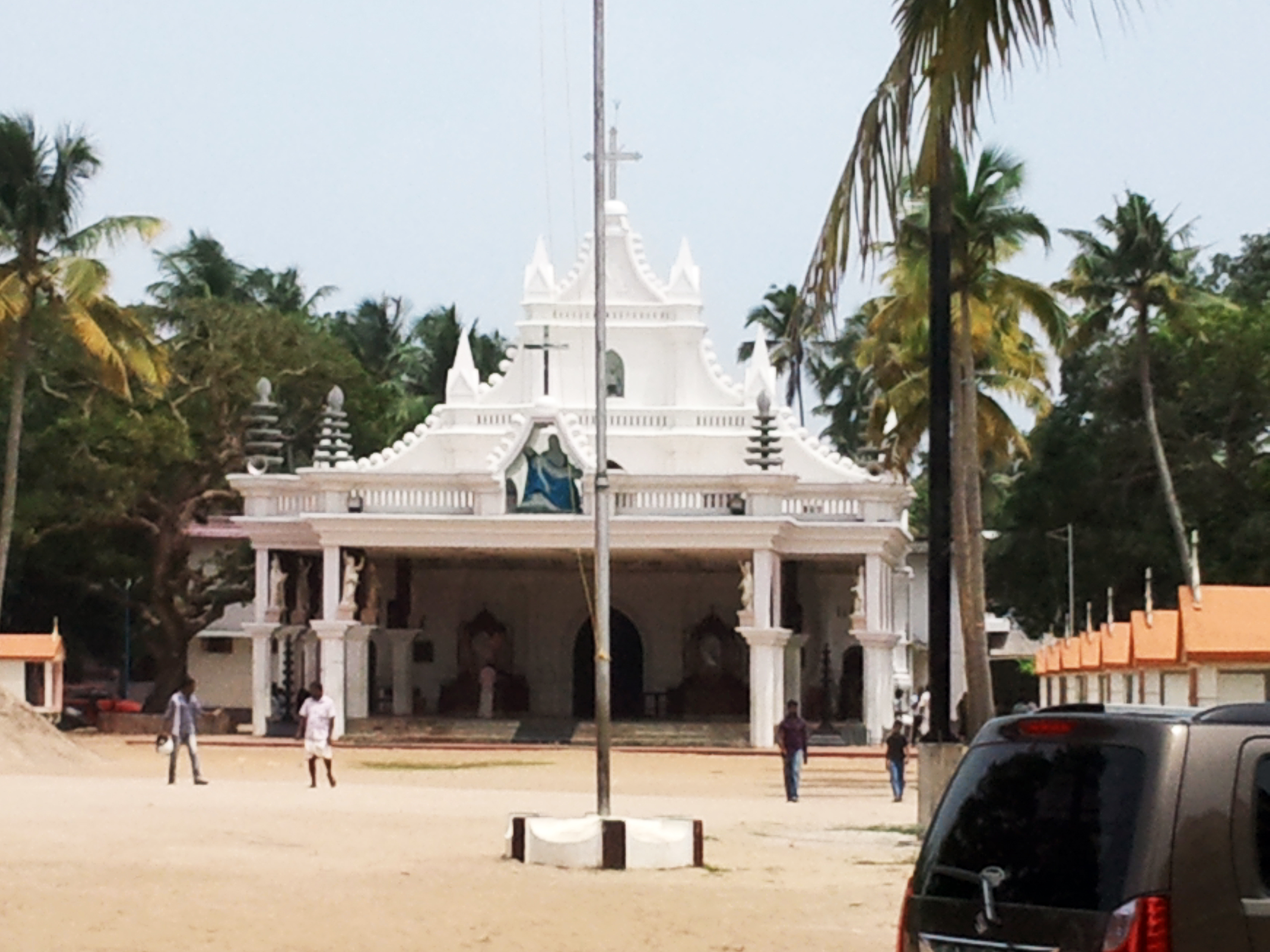
Poomkavu Church

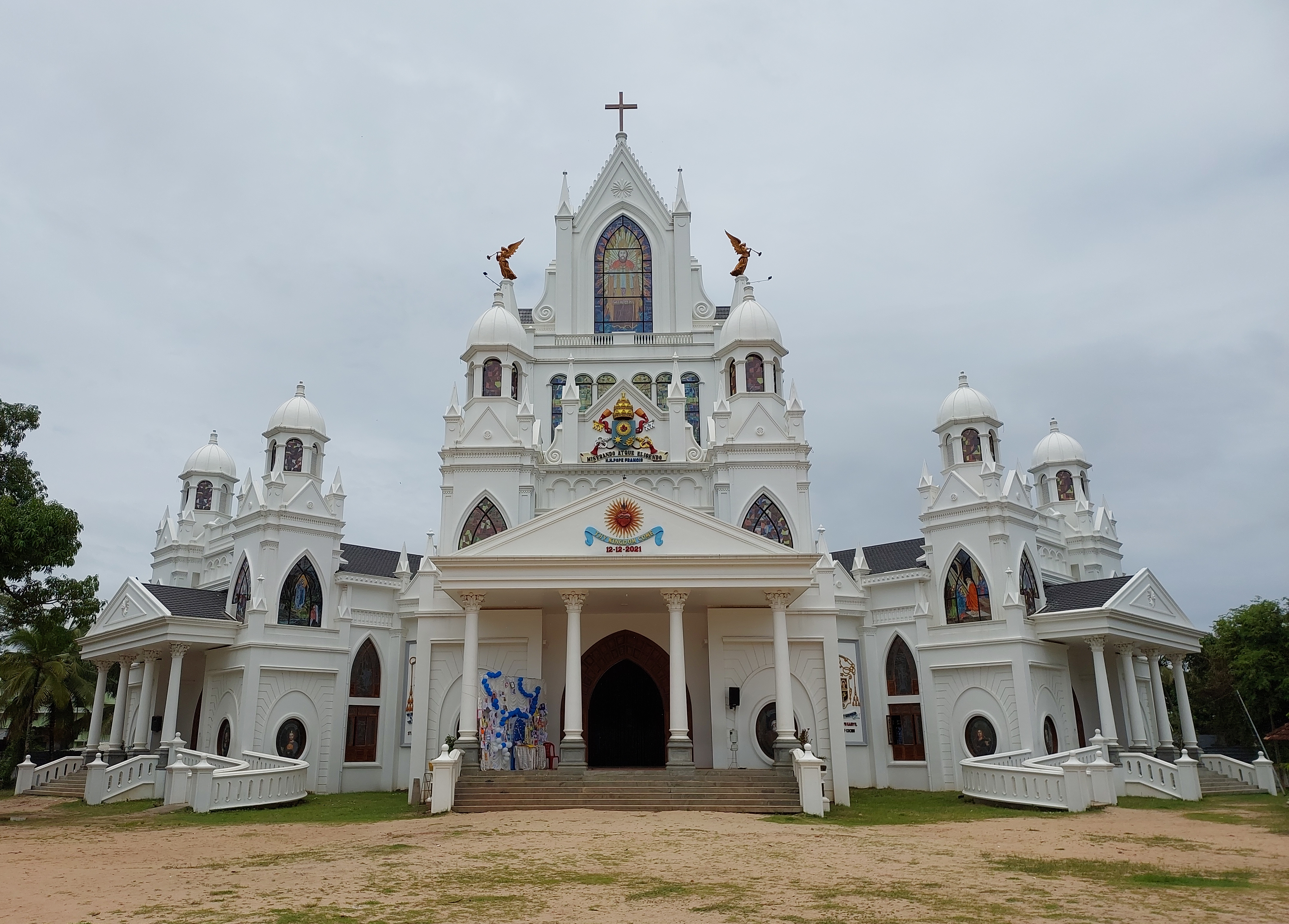
St Augustine Church, Aroor

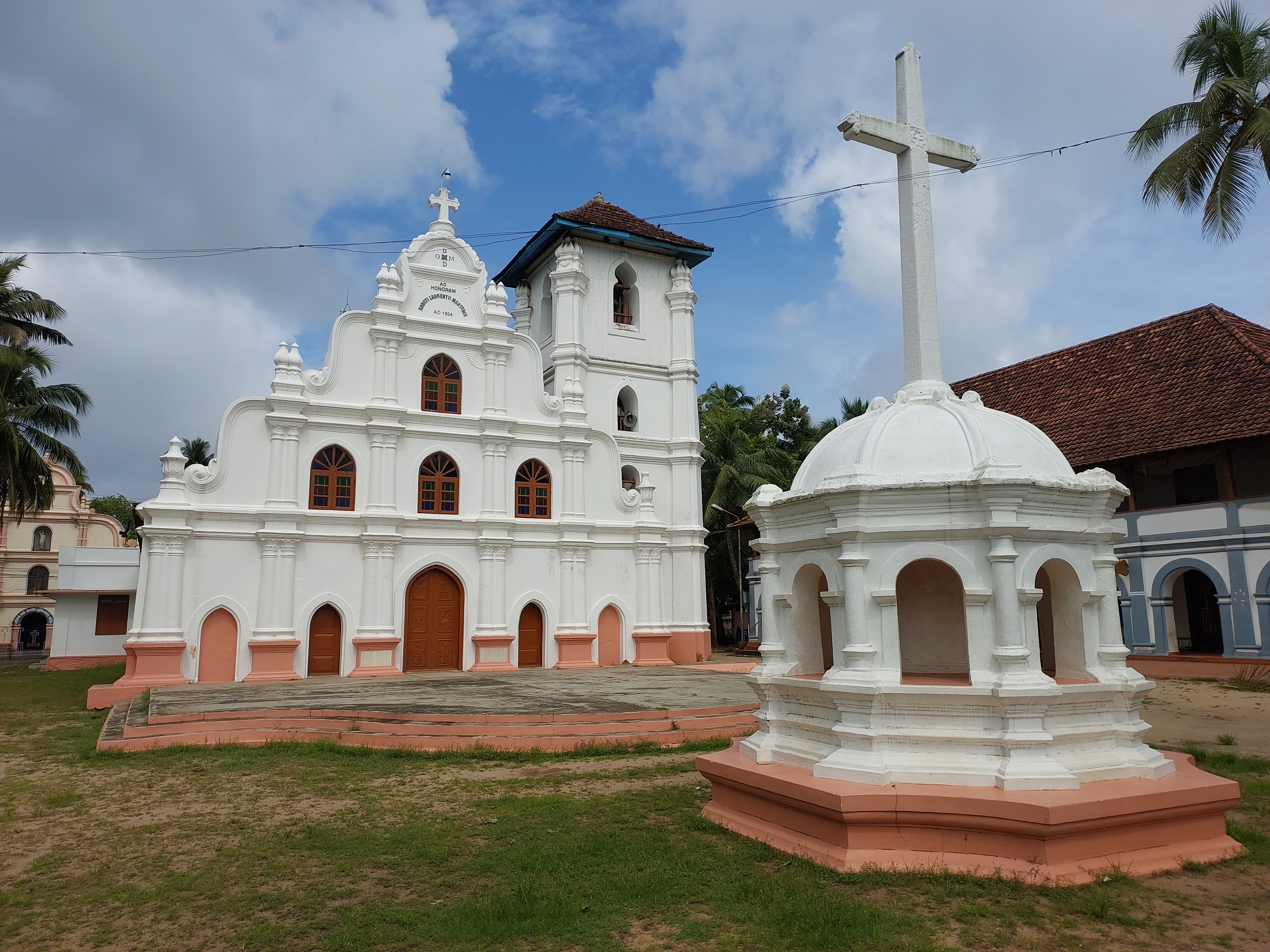
St. Lawrence Church, Edacochin

== See also ==
- Catholic Church in India
- List of Catholic dioceses in India
- Territories of Catholic dioceses in India

== Sources ==
- "Apostolic Nunciature, India & Nepal". apostolicnunciatureindia.com. 25 June 2000.
- Cheney, David M. (4 February 2024). "Cochin (Diocese) [Catholic-Hierarchy]". Catholic-Hierarchy. Archived from the original on 23 April 2024.
- "Ecclesiastical Structure of the Diocese of Cochin". Diocese of Cochin.org. 1 October 2023. Archived from the original on 30 November 2023.
- "Diocese of Cochin, India 🇮🇳". GCatholic. 21 April 2024. Archived from the original on 24 April 2024.
- "Rinunce e nomine". press.vatican.va (in Italian). Vatican City, Italy: Bollettino Sala Stampa della Santa Sede. 2 March 2024. Archived from the original on 2 March 2024.
- "Corporate Educational Agency under the Diocese of Cochin". ceacochin.org. 1 April 1981.
- "Diocese Activities and Organizations of India". Union of Catholic Asian News. Hong Kong, Asia: Union of Catholic Asian News Limited.
- "Bula Cochim traduzida" (PDF). uc.pt (in Portuguese). 23 February 2022. Archived from the original (PDF) on 21 November 2023. "1558, 4 de Fevereiro, Roma – Bula Pro excellenti praeeminentia, pela qual Paulo IV instituiu a diocese de Cochim, desmembrando o seu território da então criada arquidiocese de Goa e concedendo ao rei de Portugal o direito de padroado e de apresentação do bispo da nova diocese."
