= Mundamveli =

- Town
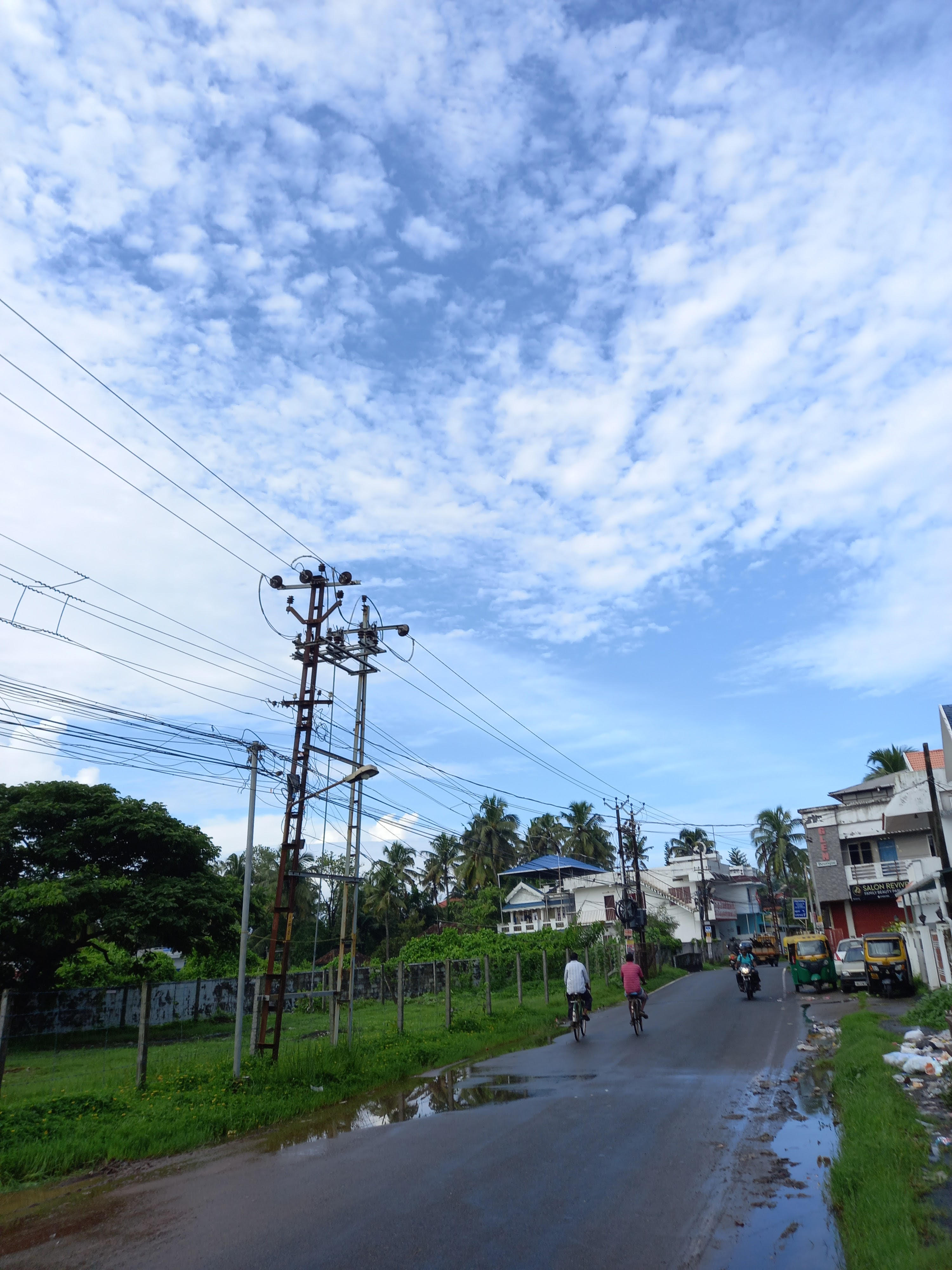
- Mundamveli's Main Street also referred to as Mundamveli Street

- Location in Kerala, India
- Coordinates: 9.927658°N 76.255159°E
- Country: India
- State: Kerala
- District: Ernakulam

Government
  - Body: Corporation_of_Cochin

Languages
  - Official: Malayalam, English
- Time zone: UTC+5:30 (IST)
- PIN: 682507
- Vehicle registration: KL-43
- Nearest city: Kochi

Mundamveli is a small town in Kochi, Kerala, India. This place is situated at a distance of 12 km from the Ernakulam Railway station and 42 km from the Nedumbassery International airport. Tourist places in the area, including Fort Kochi, Mattancherry, and Kumbalangi, are within 10 km radius of this place. The Arabian Sea is situated at a distance of 0.5 km from here. The place is rich with Indian Navy Quarters and kerala backwaters.

For Indian defence this place is important since it houses so many navy and coast guard officers. The majority of the population are Latin Catholic Christians. The major attraction of this place is the St Louis Church (AD1868). And this is the third-oldest parish in Kochi after Edakochi, and Mattancherry. The biggest celebration of this church is related to the feast of St. Jacob which is celebrated every year on 30 December. He is also known as "Santhyapunnyaalan" called by the people of Mundamveli, Manassery and Saudi. Lakh of people come from different parts of India.

Monsignor Lawrence Puliyanath, who has been proclaimed as a "Servant of God", was born 8 August 1898 and brought up in Mundamveli. He completed his primary education from St Louis High School, which is an old school in Mundamveli situated in the campus of St Louis Church. Cathedral procedures are on its way in order to proclaim him as a "saint".

Kazhuthumuttu Balasubramaniya Temple and Aryad Sri Ramakshetram are the major temples in the region.

Mundamveli is home to an English-medium school, the Santa Maria E.M. School, Kendriya Vidyalaya INS Dronacharya, St. Anne's Public School, St.Philipinery Convent School, and the Fr. Augustino Viccini Special School for hearing-impaired students.

Jishy Hospital is the major hospital situated near Mundamveli Church (St. Louis Church. PMSC Bank, Home Stays, Textiles Shops, Ice Cream Parlours, Cafeterias, St.Marys Bakery, Shilpa bakery, Muscle Style Multi Gym, Computer Cafe, etc. are located nearby St. Louis Church.

In recent times, the region has grown into one of the most flourishing parts of the entire west Kochi area. Over the past few years, Navy personnel who failed to get accommodation at the Navy staff quarters (Mahavir Enclave) here started renting houses in the civilian area, sparking an economic boom in the region. An area that was underdeveloped previously has blossomed with a variety of stores and facilities.
