= Joseph Kariyil =

Indian prelate

The Rt. Rev. Joseph Kariyil
- 35th Bishop of Cochin
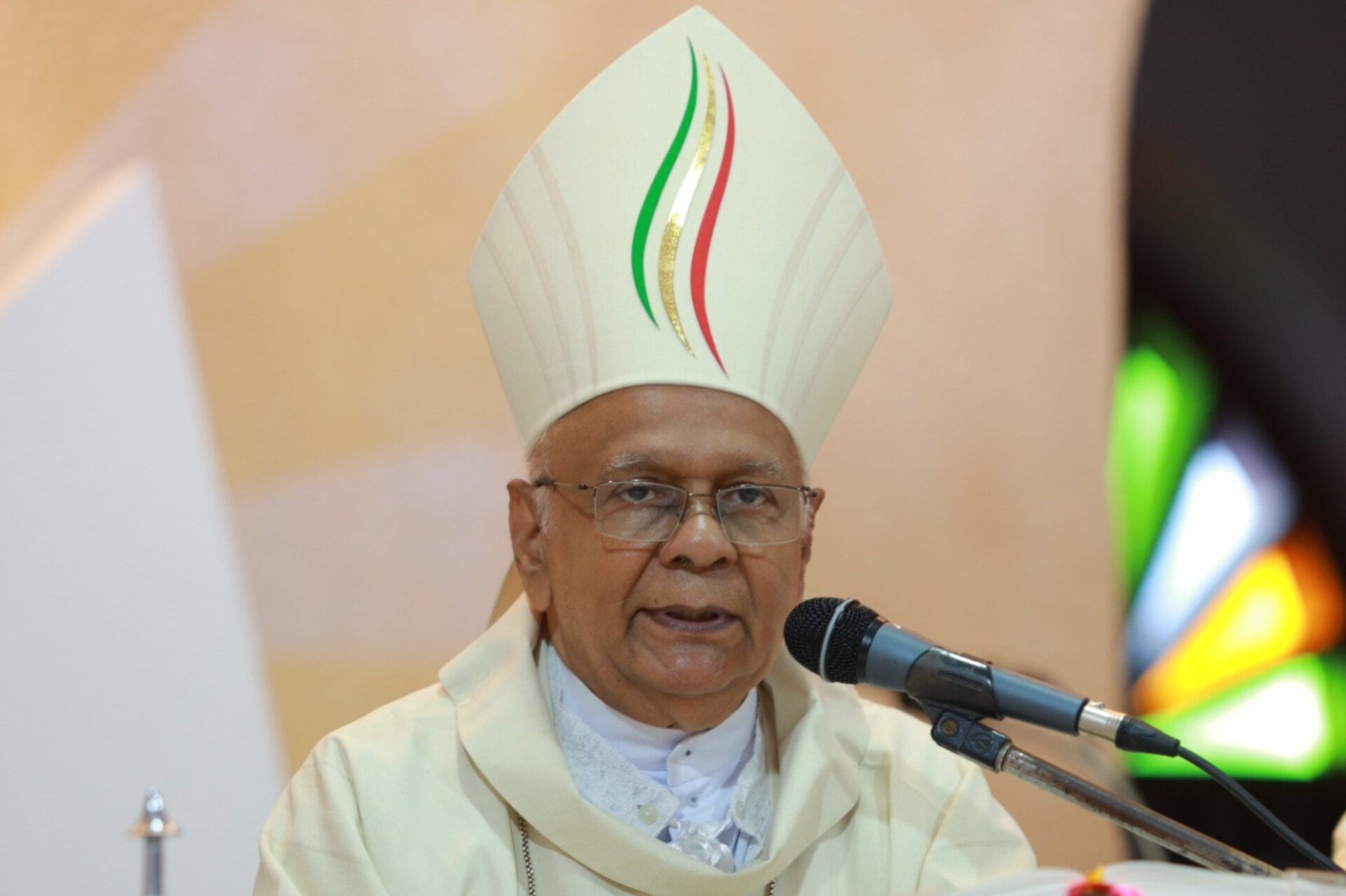
- Bishop Joseph Kariyil in 2024
- Province: Verapoly
- Diocese: Diocese of Cochin
- See: Diocese of Cochin (Emeritus)
- Appointed: 12 March 2005
- Installed: 5 July 2009
- Retired: 2 March 2024
- Predecessor: John Thattumkal
- Successor: Antony Kattiparambil
- Other posts: Secretary General, Kerala Catholic Bishop's Council 2013-2016; Chairman, Commission for Catechetics KRLCBC Till 2024; President of KRLCC - Kerala Region Latin Catholic Council & KRLCBC : 2020-2023; Bishop of Cochin : 2009-2024; Chairman, Vigilance Commission (Jagratha Commission) 2019-2024; Member, Episcopal Commission for Seminary, KRLCBC 2023-2024
- Previous posts: Editor of Talanth Magazine KCBC : 1987-1992; Director of POC & Deputy Secretary General of KCBC : 1992-2000; Vicar General, Diocese of Cochin : 2000-2005; Bishop of Punalur : 2005-2009

Orders
- Ordination: 19 December 1973 by Alexander Edezath, Bishop of Cochin
- Consecration: 3 May 2005 by Rt Rev Dr Mathias Kappil
- Rank: Bishop

Personal details
- Born: 11 January 1949 (age 77)
- Denomination: Catholic
- Parents: Kunju Varuth and Anna
- Education: Doctorate in Moral Theology
- Alma mater: Pontifical Institute Alwaye(PIA) and Pontifical Alphonsian Academy, Rome
- Motto: The Lord is my Shepherd(Psalm 23:1)
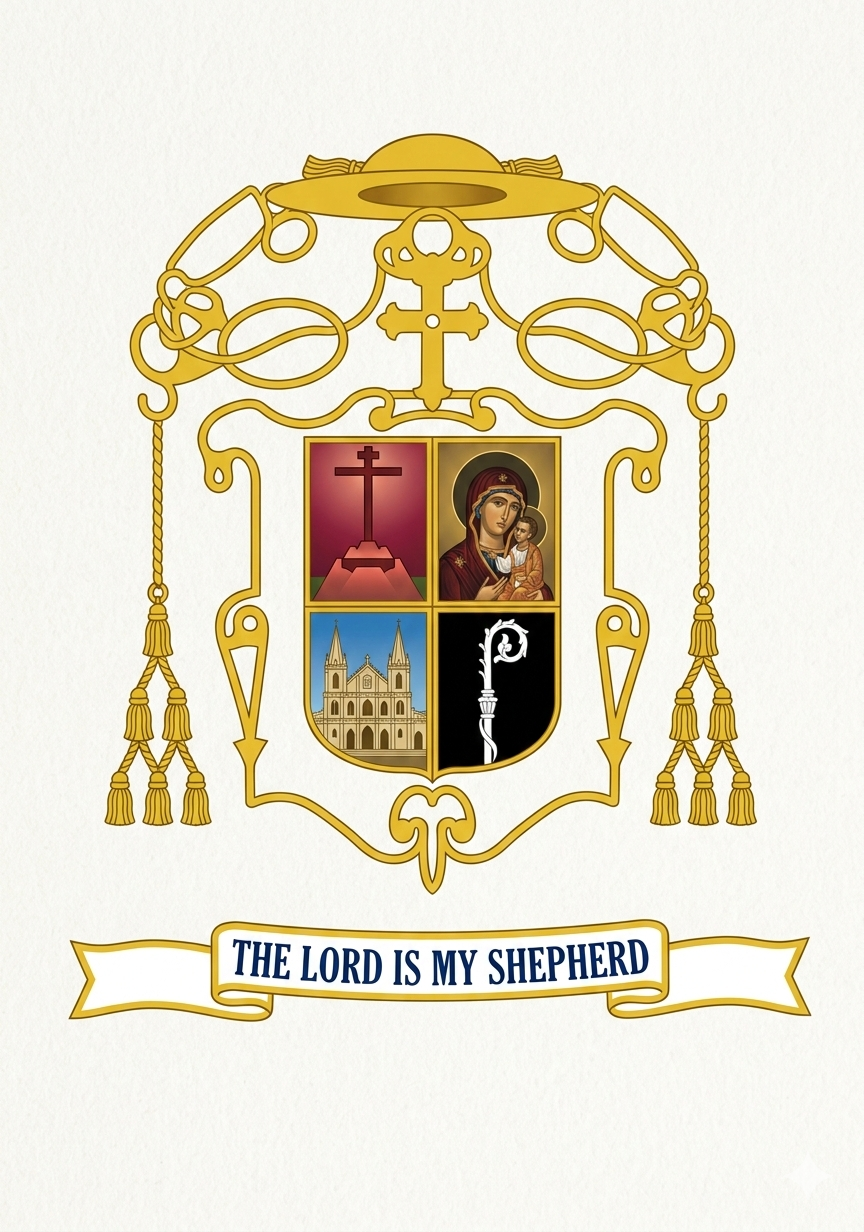
- Coat of arms: Joseph Kariyil's coat of arms

Styles of Joseph Kariyil
- Reference style: The Right Reverend; The Most Reverend
- Spoken style: Your Excellency; Your Grace
- Religious style: Bishop; Monsignor

Joseph Kariyil (born 11 January 1949) is an Indian prelate of the Roman Catholic Church who was bishop of Cochin from 2009 to 2024.

== Biography ==
Joseph Kariyil was born on 11 January 1949 in Arthunkal, near Alleppey. He was ordained a priest on 19 December 1973 by Bishop Alexander Edezhath at Santa Cruz Cathedral Basilica, Fort Cochin. He was appointed as the Bishop of Punalur on 12 March 2005 and was consecrated on 3 May 2005. He was appointed Bishop of Cochin on 8 May 2009. He was installed in as the Bishop of Cochin on 5 July 2009. His role as the bishop of Cochin made great developments in the diocese, when he installed as the bishop of Cochin, there were 38 parishes and now there are 51 parishes in the diocese.

On 2 March 2024, Pope Francis officially accepted bp Joseph Kariyil's resignation due to retirement age of 75 according to the 1983 Code of Canon Law.

He studied at Alphonciano Academy, Rome, Italy. He served the Church in the capacities of an assistant Vicar, Vicar and the editor of Talent Magazine. He also served as the Director of Pastoral Orientation Centre and as the Vicar General of Cochin diocese.

== Offices held ==
Sl. No	Field of Activity	Year
1	Assistant Vicar at St. Louis Church, Mundamveli	1974-1977
2	Assistant Vicar at Santa Curz Basilica, Fortcochin	1977-1978
3	Higher Studies - Saint Alphonsian's Academy, Rome	1978-1983
4	Parish Priest at St. Augustine's Church, Aroor	1983-1987
5	Editor of Talanth Magazine, POC	1987-1992
6	Director of P. O. C. & Deputy Secretary General of Kerala Catholic Bishops' Council	1992-2000
7	Vicar General, Diocese of Cochin	2000-2005
8	Bishop of Punalur, Roman Catholic Diocese of Punalur	2005-2009
9	Installed as Bishop of Cochin Roman Catholic Diocese of Cochin	5 July 2009
10	Secretary General, KCBC	2013-2016
11	Chairman, Commission for Catechetics, KRLCBC	Till 2024
12	President, KRLCC - Kerala Region Latin Catholic Council and KRLCBC	2020-2023
13	Chairman, Jagratha Commission, KCBC	2019-2024
14	Member, Episcopal Commission for Seminary (St Joseph Pontifical Seminary, Carmelgiri) KRLCBC	2023-2024

== Arms ==
Coat of arms of Joseph Kariyil
Notes The coat of arms was adopted when he was appointed as the Bishop of Cochin. Adopted 05 July 2009 Escutcheon Coonan Cross Mattancherry, Our Lady of Perpectual help,Santa Cruz Cathedral Basilica, Kochi, crozier Motto "The Lord is my Shepherd" Symbolism Coonan Cross: symbolises historical Coonan Cross Oath of 1653 at Mattancherry; Santa Cruz Cathedral Basilica: The historic Santa Cruz Cathedral Basilica his Cathedral Church; Our Lady of Perpetual help: Special devotion to Mother Mary.; crozier: stands for his authority as the Shepherd of the flock

== See also ==
- Diocese of Cochin
- Catholic Bishops' Conference of India
- Roman Catholicism in India
