= Administrative divisions of Kerala =

The Indian state of Kerala borders with the states of Tamil Nadu on the south and east, Karnataka on the north and the Arabian Sea coastline on the west. The Western Ghats, bordering the eastern boundary of the State, form an almost continuous mountain wall, except near Palakkad where there is a natural mountain pass known as the Palakkad Gap. When the independent India amalgamated small states together, Travancore and Cochin states were integrated to form Travancore-Cochin state on 1 July 1949. However, Malabar remained under the Madras province. The States Reorganisation Act of 1 November 1956 elevated Kerala to statehood.

Kerala is divided into districts, revenue divisions, taluks, and villages for revenue administration, and for rural development, it is divided into blocks.

Each state government department has its own administrative divisions, usually all functioning at the district level. Other divisions include police districts and education districts. A police district is usually coterminous with a district or within a district.

== Revenue divisions ==
On the basis of geographical, historical and cultural similarities, the districts are generally grouped into North Kerala, Central Kerala and South Kerala.

Revenue administrative units in Kerala include the district, revenue division, taluk, and revenue village. This hierarchical structure is primarily focused on land revenue collection and management of land-related records and taxes.

=== Districts ===
The state is divided into 14 districts. These districts are the pivotal administrative divisions of the state, serving as centers for revenue and general administration. The name and headquarters of each district are usually the major city or town, with the exception of Wayanad district, which is headquartered in Kalpetta. The Collectorate plays a pivotal role as the seat of district administration.

Each district is headed by a District Collector (an IAS officer), who also serves as District Magistrate, District Election Officer, and other roles. The Collector oversees land revenue administration and is assisted by deputy collectors.

=== Revenue divisions ===
These 14 districts are further divided into revenue divisions. There are total 27 revenue divisions in Kerala. Each revenue division contains several taluks within its jurisdiction for revenue administration. Each revenue division has a Revenue Divisional Office, headed by Revenue Divisional Officer/Sub Collector (RDO), who is also the Sub Divisional Magistrate.

=== Taluks ===
There are 78 taluks in Kerala. A taluk (also known as sub-district) is the administrative level below of a district. A taluk consists of several revenue villages under its jurisdiction and has a Taluk office headed by a Tehsildar. The functions of the taluk office include land revenue administration, election oversight, executive magisterial duties, and disaster management.

=== Revenue villages ===
There are 1670 revenue villages in total. Each has a Village Office, headed by Village Officer. It's the primary level of land revenue administration.

The village is divided into Amsoms and Desams for land tax administration.

== Geographical divisions ==
Regional grouping of districts in Kerala

=== North Kerala ===
- Kasaragod
- Kannur
- Wayanad
- Kozhikode

=== Central Kerala ===
- Malappuram
- Palakkad
- Thrissur
- Ernakulam

=== South Kerala ===
- Idukki
- Kottayam
- Alappuzha
- Pathanamthitta
- Kollam
- Thiruvananthapuram

=== Historical regions ===
Historical region / Kingdom	Corresponding present-day districts
Travancore (Venad)	Thiruvananthapuram, Kollam, Pathanamthitta, Alappuzha, Kottayam, parts of Idukki
Cochin (Perumpadappu Swaroopam)	Thrissur, Ernakulam, parts of Alappuzha, parts of Idukki, parts of Palakkad
Malabar	Kasaragod, Kannur, Wayanad, Kozhikode, Malappuram, parts of Palakkad

== Development divisions ==
Developmental administration in Kerala is carried out through blocks in rural areas. At the district level, district panchayats oversee rural governance. Each block comprises a set of grama panchayats.

In urban areas, governance is handled by municipal corporations, municipalities, or town panchayats, depending on the size of the town.

=== Urban level ===
The state has 87 municipalities and 6 municipal corporations.

- List of urban local bodies in Kerala
- List of municipal corporations in Kerala

=== Rural level ===
The state has 941 gram panchayats, 152 block panchayats and 14 district panchayats for rural governance.

Kerala has 152 blocks (Community Development Blocks), each with a block panchayat that oversees rural development and governance.

- List of Development Blocks in Kerala
- Local government in Kerala

== Police divisions ==
The State of Kerala is divided into two police zones: the South Zone, headquartered in Thiruvananthapuram, and the North Zone, headquartered in Kozhikode, for better law and order maintenance and police administration. Each police zone comprises two or more police ranges within its administrative purview. There are four police ranges: Thiruvananthapuram, Ernakulam, Thrissur, and Kannur. Each police range comprises several police districts within its administrative jurisdiction.

=== Police Districts ===
Sl.No	Police District	Headquarters
1	Thiruvananthapuram City	Thiruvananthapuram
2	Thiruvananthapuram Rural	Palayam, Thiruvananthapuram
3	Kollam City	Kollam
4	Kollam Rural	Kottarakkara
5	Pathanamthitta	
6	Kottayam	
7	Kochi City	Kochi
8	Eranakulam Rural	Aluva
9	Alappuzha	
10	Idukki	
11	Thrissur City	Thrissur
12	Thrissur Rural	Irinjalakuda
13	Palakkad	
14	Malappuram	
15	Kozhikkode City	Kozhikode
16	Kozhikkode Rural	Vatakara
17	Wayanad	Kalpetta
18	Kannur City	Kannur
19	Kannur Rural	Dharmashala
20	Kasaragod	
