= Palayam Juma Mosque =

Mosque in Thiruvananthapuram, Kerala, India

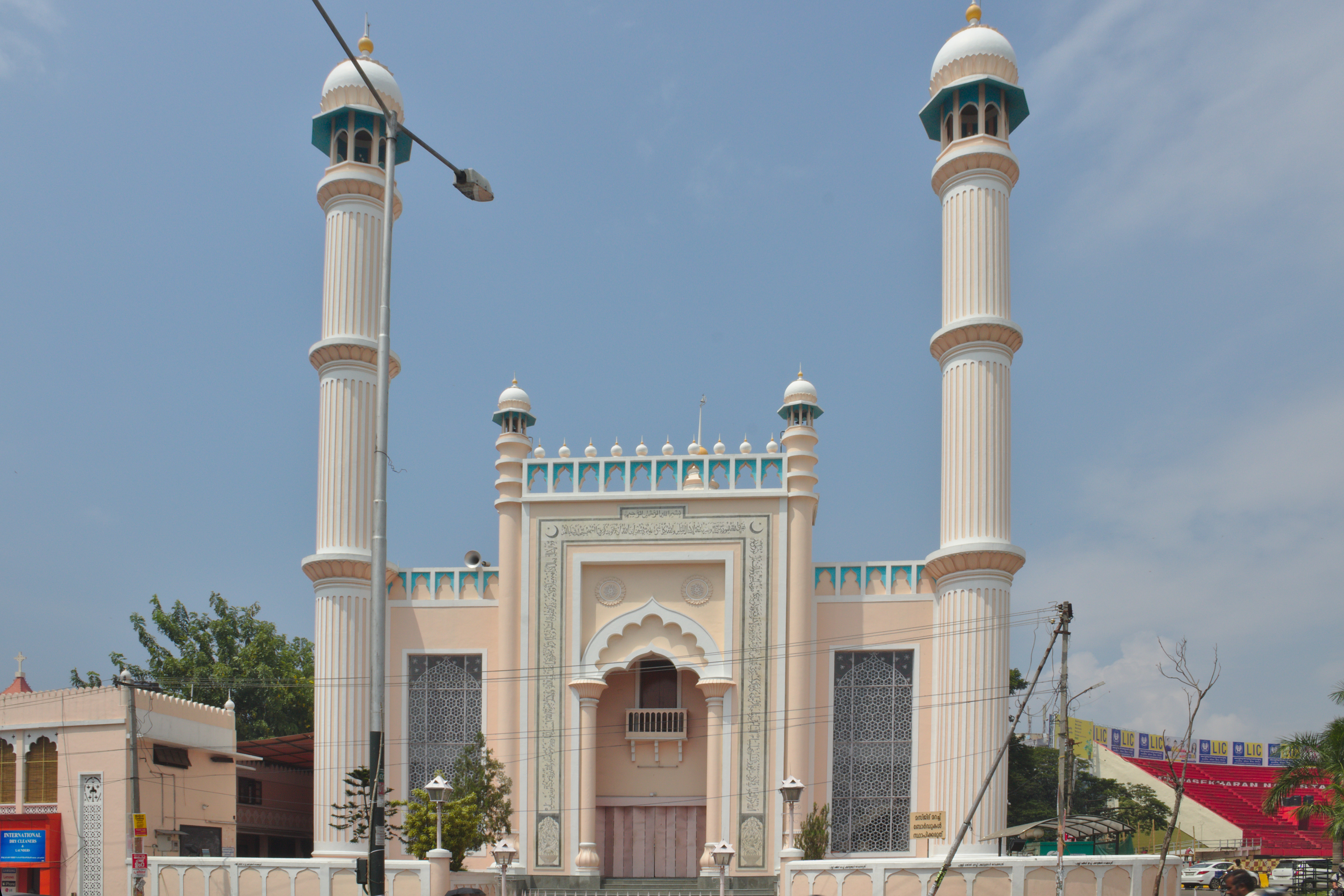
- The mosque in 2017

- Location of the mosque in Kerala

Religion
- Affiliation: Sunni Islam
- Rite: Hanafi
- Ecclesiastical or organisational status: Friday mosque
- Status: Active

Location
- Location: Palayam, Thiruvananthapuram, Kerala
- Country: India
- Coordinates: 8°30′13″N 76°57′2″E

Architecture
- Type: Mosque architecture
- Style: Indo-Islamic
- Founder: British Indian Second Regiment
- Completed: 1813 (first mosque); 1967 (current structure)

Specifications
- Capacity: 2,000 worshippers
- Dome: One
- Minarets: Two; One tower (Martyr's Column)

Website
- palayamjumamasjid.in

The Palayam Juma Mosque, or more commonly known as the Palayam Juma Masjid (Malayalam: പാളയം ജുമാമസ്ജിദ്), officially the Masjid-i Jahān-Numā (lit. 'World-reflecting Mosque'), is an Hanafi Sunni Friday mosque, located in the town of Palayam, Thiruvananthapuram, in the state of Kerala, India.

The Palayam Juma Masjid is the most important mosque in Thiruvananthapuram. Located within the mosque's grounds is a madrassa. Adjacent to the mosque are a Hindu temple and a Catholic church.

== History ==
The first mosque was erected in Palayam in 1813 CE, when the British Indian Second Regiment was stationed in the town. A small mosque, known in local terms as Pattalappalli, or military mosque, was constructed with an open place for Eid prayers. In 1824 when the sixth regiment was posted in Palayam its officers bought land, appointed a Qazi – the Labba family (which ended with Sheikh Mansoor Labba) – and entrusted documents of the mosque to the Muezzin. In 1848, when the sixteenth regiment were station in Palayam, its Jamadars and Havildars made considerable improvements to the mosque including the construction of a gate and arrangements for the maintenance and upkeep of the mosque building. When other regiments were stationed in the town, its officers brought about further changes and improvements.

Later, in the 1960s, many philanthropic businessmen and government officials of Thiruvananthapuram helped to fund renovation of the mosque and constructed the present-day Palayam Juma Masjid under the leadership of the Qazi and Imam Moulavi Sheikh Abul Hassan Ali Al-Noori. The Juma Masjid was inaugurated by the President of India Dr. Zakir Hussain in 1967.

Sheikh Abul Hassan Ali Al-Noori, a freedom fighter, multilingual scholar and the first imam of the mosque who served as imam from 1959 until 1979, and helped elevate to its present-day status from a pattalappalli, during his tenure.

In 2009, Kamala Surayya, an Indian-English poet and author, was interred in the khabaristan, located in the mosque's grounds.

== Gallery ==
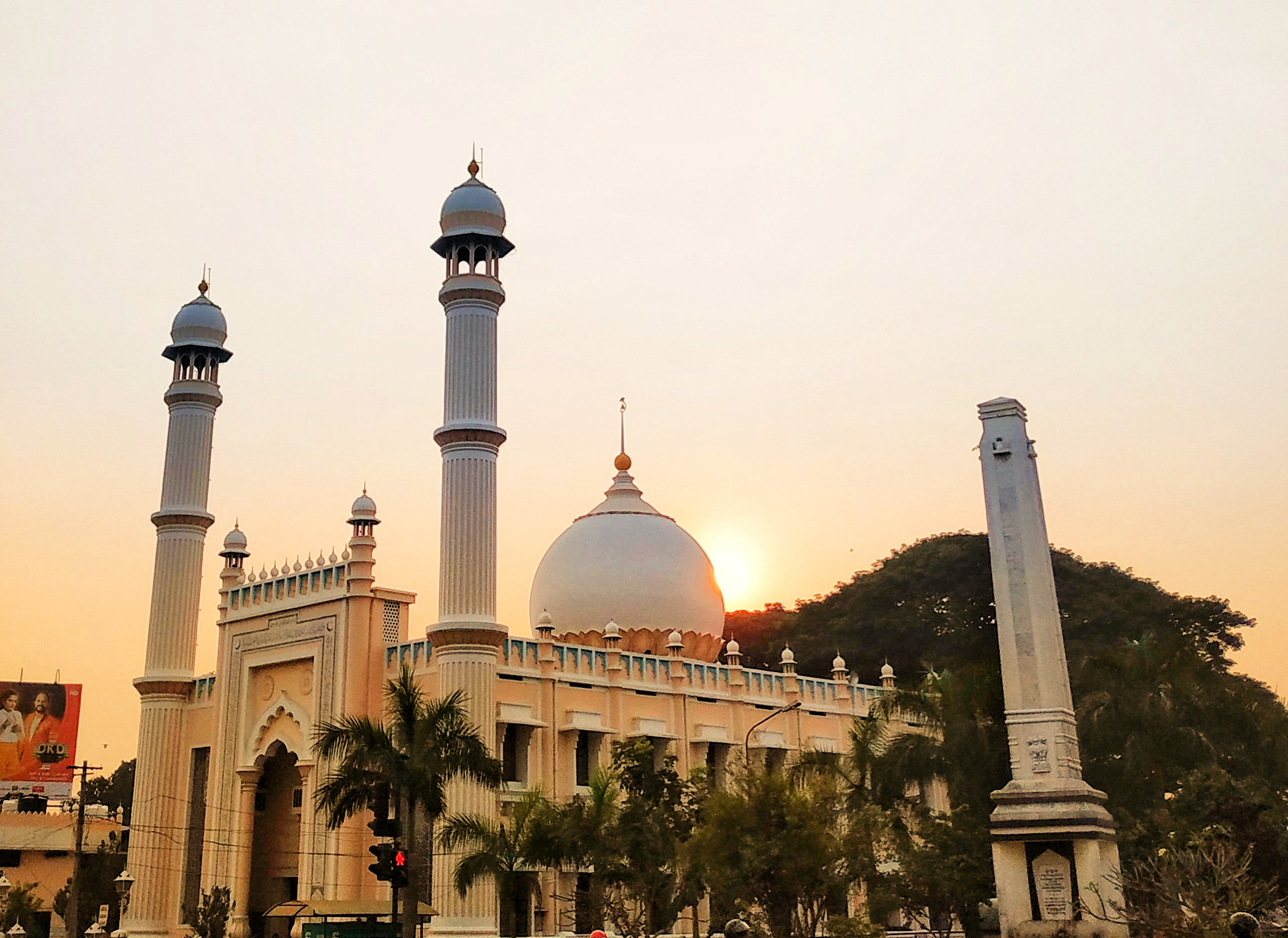
The mosque and Martyr's Column

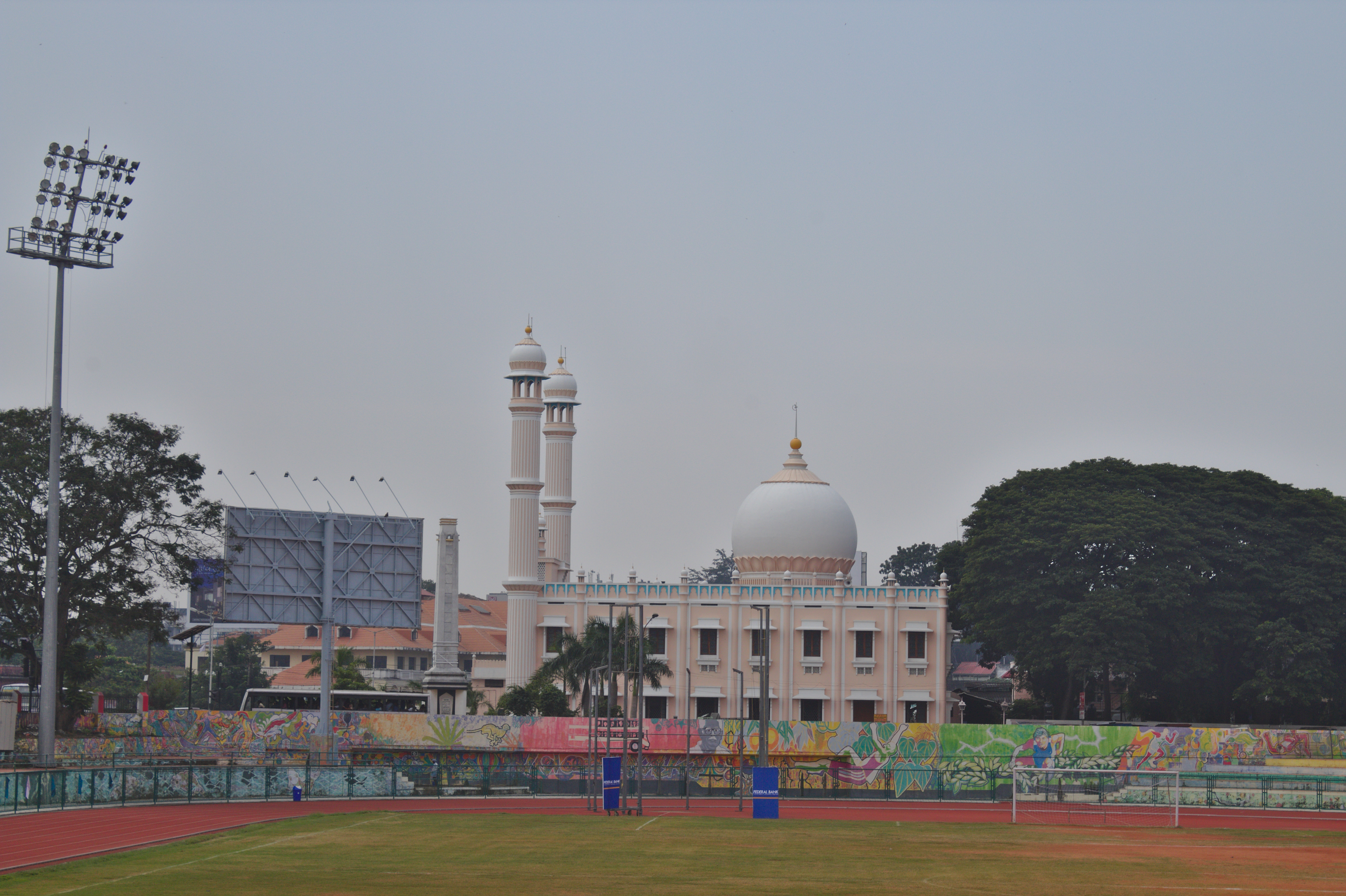
The mosque and adjacent stadium

== See also ==
- Islam in India
- List of mosques in India
- List of mosques in Kerala
