= Archdiocese of Trivandrum =

Latin Catholic archdiocese in Kerala, India

Archdiocese of Thiruvananthapuram തിരുവനന്തപുരം ലത്തീൻ അതിരൂപത
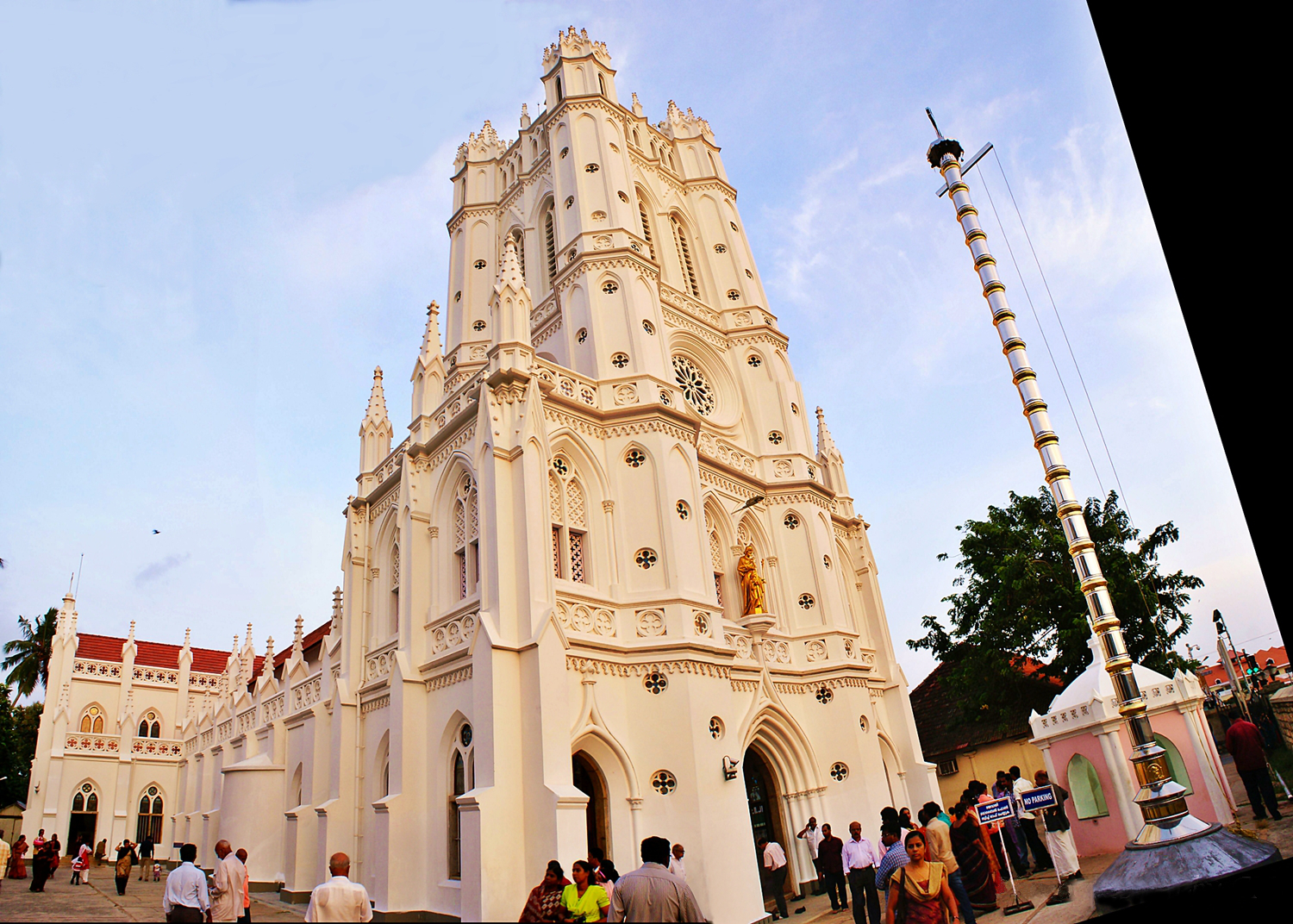
- St. Joseph's Cathedral

Location
- Country: India
- Ecclesiastical province: Thiruvananthapuram
- Headquarters: Vellayambalam, Thiruvananthapuram
- Coordinates: 8°30′44″N 76°57′45″E

Statistics
- Area: 686 km^{2} (265 sq mi)
- Population: Total; Catholics: (as of 2020); 2,543,100; 297,121 (11.7%)
- Parishes: 95

Information
- Denomination: Catholic Church
- Sui iuris church: Latin Church
- Rite: Roman Rite
- Established: 1 July 1937
- Cathedral: St. Joseph's Catedral, Palayam, Thiruvananthapuram
- Patron saint: Thérèse of Lisieux
- Secular priests: 261

Current leadership
- Pope: Leo XIV
- Metropolitan Archbishop: Most Rev. Dr. Thomas J. Netto
- Suffragans: Dioceses of Quilon, Alleppey, Punalur, and Neyyattinkara
- Auxiliary Bishops: Rt. Rev. Dr. Christudas Rajappan
- Vicar General: Very Rev. Msgr. Fr. Eugine H. Pereira
- Judicial Vicar: Very Rev. Fr. Jose G., MCL

Website
- www.latinarchdiocesetrivandrum.org

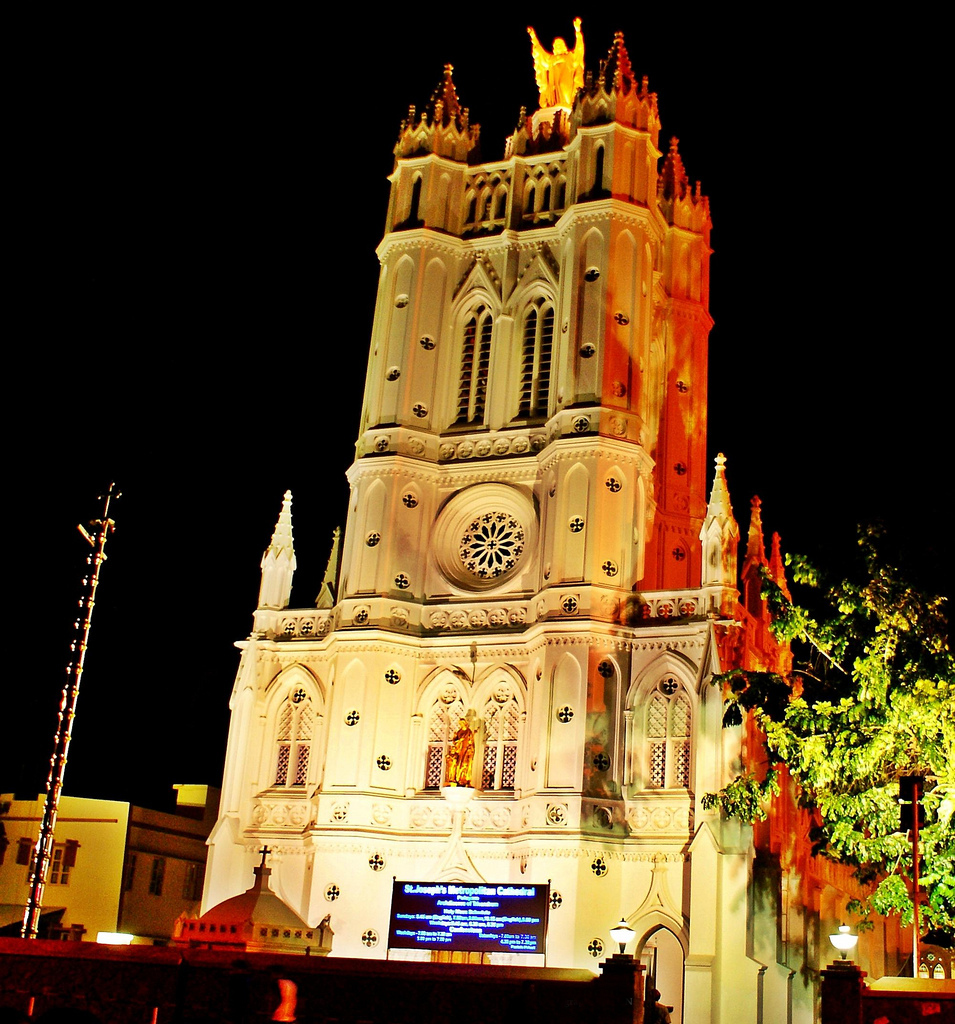
St. Joseph's Cathedral at night

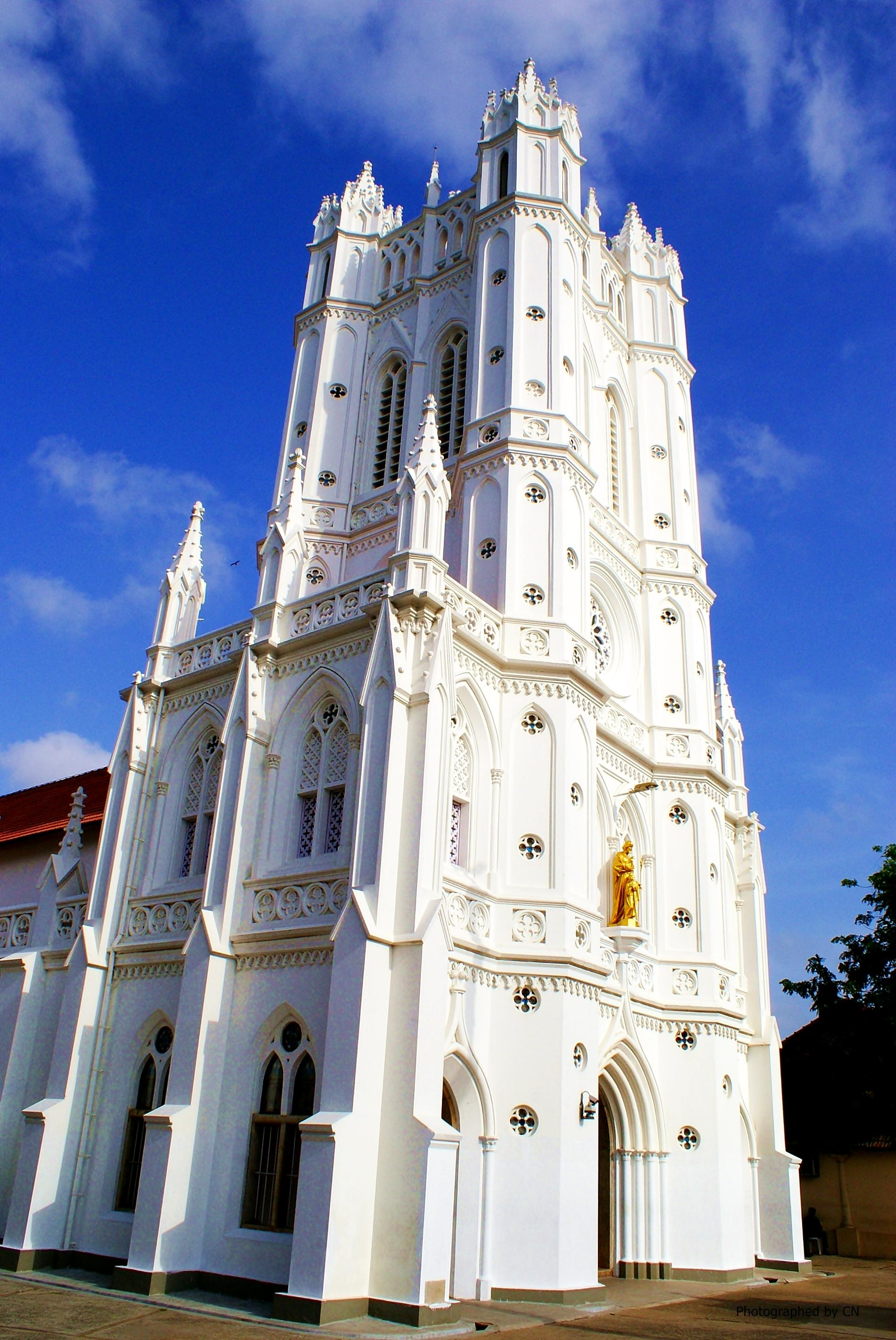
St. Joseph's cathedral, Thiruvananthapuram

The Archdiocese of Trivandrum (Latin: Trivandren(sis) Latinorum) is a Latin Church ecclesiastical territory or archdiocese of the Catholic Church. Its episcopal see is Thiruvananthapuram in Kerala, India. It shares its see with the major archeparchy of the Syro-Malankara Catholic Church, the Major Archeparchy of Trivandrum. The archdiocese a metropolitan see of an ecclesiastical province with four suffragan dioceses.

== Population and area ==
The Metropolitan Archdiocese of Thiruvananthapuram is one of the biggest episcopal territories in Kerala, with a Catholic population of nearly 280,000 people, even after the bifurcation of the Diocese of Neyyattinkara some years ago. The 95 parishes, 31 quasi parishes and 34 mass centers of the Diocese are grouped together into 9 Foranes. At present there are 164 incardinated priests in the Archdiocese including those retired, studying and working for other Dioceses, and 161 religious priests.

== Topography ==
The archdiocese is headquartered in Kerala's capital city Thiruvananthapuram. The archdiocese is bounded by the Arabian Sea on the West and Western Ghat on the East. There are wooded highlands on the Western Ghats in the eastern and northeastern borders, and a long shoreline with internationally renowned beaches, historic monuments, backwater stretches and a rich cultural heritage.

The diocese is bounded on the north by the Diocese of Quilon, on the east by the Ghats, on the west by the Arabian Sea and on the south by the Diocese of Kottar.

== History ==
=== Early history ===
With the arrival of the Portuguese but especially with the advent of the pioneer missionary Francis Xavier, Latin Catholicism spread far and wide in these parts; by the close of the sixteenth century there were well-established Christian communities along the Trivandrum coast. But with the suppression of the Society of Jesus, this missionary enterprises came to a close.

The second phase of the missionary enterprise in the Diocese begins with the dawn of the twentieth century. Bishop Benziger, who became coadjutor Bishop of Quilon in 1900 and Bishop in 1905, propagated Christianity in the Diocese with the help of missionary priests. In 1931, when he retired to the Carmel Hill Monastery, Thiruvananthapuram there were Christian communities established in almost all places of the interior region. As early as 1919, Bishop Benziger recommended the establishment of the Diocese of Trivandrum, but it materialized only after his retirement.

=== Erection of the diocese and first bishops ===
On 1 July 1937, by the Bull "In Ora Malabarica" Pope Pius XI created the Diocese of Trivandrum with the four taluks of Neyyantinkara, Nedumangad, Thiruvananthapuram and Chirayinkeezh bifurcated from the diocese of Quilon. Bishop Vincent V Dereere, OCD., Bishop of Quilon was transferred to the newly erected Diocese of Trivandrum which was entrusted to the Carmelites of the Flanders Province (Belgium).

In 1952, when the Diocese of Alleppey was erected by the bifurcation of the formerly Padroado Diocese of Cochin, the stripe of coastal parishes which formed the Trivandrum Portuguese Mission was temporarily annexed to the Diocese of Trivandrum with Bishop Vincent V. Dereere as its administrator. On 20 May 1955, this territory was definitely integrated in the Diocese of Trivandrum.

On 24 October 1966, when Bishop Vincent V.Dereere OCD. resigned from the See of Trivandrum, Bishop Peter Bernard Pereira was the first Indian to be appointed Bishop of Trivandrum, and the Diocese passed into the hands of the indigenous clergy. The Liturgical and Catechetical renewal initiated by Bishop Bernard Pereira after the II Vatican Council marks the beginning of renewal in the Diocese. St.Xavier's College, Thumba, All Saint's College and various other pioneering contributions of Bp. Pereira made a strong footing for the growth of the Diocese of Trivandrum.

The Diocese celebrated its Golden Jubilee year in 1987, and a renewal movement was initiated by Bishop Jacob Acharuparambil. In 1512 Basic Christian Communities lay people come forward to share responsibilities. On 14 June 1996 the Diocese of Trivandrum lost territory to the newly erected Diocese of Neyyattinkara.

=== Bishop ===
On 17 June 2004 Pope John Paul II elevated the Diocese of Trivandrum into an Archdiocese, and appointed Soosa Pakiam as its first Archbishop. On 2 February 2016, Pope Francis appointed Christudas Rajappan as the new auxiliary bishop of the diocese. Patroness of the Archdiocese is St. Theresa of Child Jesus.

== Ordinaries ==
Bishops and Archbishops

Ordinary	Designation	Year of appointment	Last year of service
Vincent Victor Dereere, O.C.D.	Bishop	1937	1966
Peter B. Pereira	Bishop	1966	1978
Benedict Jacob Acharuparambil, O.F.M. Cap.	Bishop	1979	1991
Maria Kalist Soosa Pakiam	Archbishop	1991	2022
Thomas J. Netto	Archbishop	2022	present

Coadjutor and Auxiliary Bishop's

Ordinary	Designation	Year of appointment	Last year of service
Maria Kalist Soosa Pakiam	Coadjutor Bishop	1990	1991
Christudas Rajappan	Auxiliary Bishop	2016	present

== Suffragan dioceses ==
- Alleppey
- Neyyattinkara
- Punalur
- Quilon

== Archdiocesan Officials ==
S.No	Name	Designation
1	Most Rev. Dr. Thomas J. Netto	Metropolitan Archbishop
2	Maria Kalist Soosa Pakiam	Metropolitan Archbishop Emeritus
3	Most Rev. Dr. Christudas Rajappan	Auxiliary Bishop
4	Very Rev. Msgr. Eugine H. Pereira	Vicar General
5	Very Rev. Dr. Baby Bevinson DCL	Judicial Vicar
6	Very Rev. Fr. Jose G., MCL	Chancellor
7	Rev. Fr. Julius Savio K. M. STL	Procurator
8	Very Rev. Fr. Davidson	Vicar Forane of Anjengo Forane
9	Very Rev. Msgr.Dr. Nicholas T.	Vicar Forane of Kovalam Forane
10	Very Rev. Msgr. Wilfred E.,	Vicar Forane of Palayam Forane
11	Very Rev. Fr. Rodrig Kutty	Vicar Forane of Pettah Forane
12	Very Rev. Dr. Dyson Y.	Vicar Forane of Pulluvila Forane
13	Very Rev. Dr. Hyacinth M. Nayakam	Vicar Forane of Puthukurichy Forane
14	Very Rev. Silvester Kuris	Vicar Forane of Thoothoor Forane
15	Very Rev. Dr. Sabbas Ignatious	Vicar Forane of Valiathura Forane
16	Very Rev. Fr. Robinson	Vicar Forane, Kazhakuttom Forane
17	Very Rev. Fr. Aneesh Fernandez	Vicar Forane, Vattiyoorkavu Forane
18	Very Rev. Fr. Andrew Kosmos	Rector, St. Vincent's Seminary
19	Very Rev. Msgr. George Paul A	Co-ordinator, Archdiocesan Congregation Handmaids Of Hope
20	Rev. Dr. Laurence Culas, M.A, M.Th, S.T.D	Co-ordinator of Ministries
21	Rev. Dr. Sabbas Ignatious	Secretary, Senate of Priests

== Forane ==
- Anjengo Forane
- Kovalam Forane
- Palayam Forane
- Pettah Forane
- Pulluvila Forane
- Puthukurichy Forane
- Thoothoor Forane
- Valiyathura Forane
- Kazhakkutom Forane
- Vattiyoorkavu Forane
