= Benedict Jacob Acharuparambil =

Benedict Jacob Acharuparambil OFM Cap
- Bishop of Trivandrum
- Church: Catholic Church
- Diocese: Diocese of Trivandrum
- In office: 3 August 1979 – 31 January 1991
- Predecessor: Peter B. Pereira
- Successor: Soosa Pakiam

Orders
- Ordination: 17 March 1945
- Consecration: 7 October 1979 by Joseph Kelanthara

Personal details
- Born: 16 April 1919 Pallippuram, Kingdom of Cochin, British Empire
- Died: 13 August 1995 (aged 76)

Jacob Acharuparambil, OFM Cap (16 April 1919 – 13 August 1995) was the Third Bishop of the Roman Catholic Archdiocese of Trivandrum.
