= Diocese of Neyyattinkara =

Roman Catholic diocese in Kerala, India

Coordinates: 8.3955°N 77.0872°E

Diocese of Neyyattinkara Dioecesis Neyyattinkaraensis നെയ്യാറ്റിൻകര രൂപത

Location
- Country: India
- Ecclesiastical province: Trivandrum
- Metropolitan: Trivandrum

Statistics
- Area: 1,497 km^{2} (578 sq mi)
- Population: Total; Catholics: (as of 2004); 1,334,865; 128,730 (9.6%)

Information
- Denomination: Catholic Church
- Sui iuris church: Latin Church
- Rite: Latin rite
- Cathedral: Cathedral of the Immaculate Conception in Neyyattinkara
- Patron saint: Saint Joseph

Current leadership
- Pope: Leo XIV
- Bishop: Selvarajan Dasan
- Metropolitan Archbishop: Thomas J. Netto
- Vicar General: G. Christudas
- Bishops emeritus: Vincent Samuel

Website
- neyyattinkaradiocese.org

The Diocese of Neyyattinkara (Latin: Neyyattinkaraen(sis)) is a diocese located in the town of Neyyattinkara in the ecclesiastical province of Trivandrum in India.

== History ==
- 14 June 1996: Established as Diocese of Neyyattinkara from the Diocese of Trivandrum

The majority of the population of Neyyattinkara Roman Catholic Diocese belong to major ethnic group of Nadar Community. The Holy Throne has established the Diocese of Neyyattinkara for the exclusive evangelisation of the area, progress and preservation of the Latin Catholic Minority.

== Leadership ==
- Bishops of Neyyattinkara Roman (Latin) Rite
  - Bishop Vincent Samuel (14 June 1996 – 18 October 2025), retired
  - Bishop Selvarajan Dasan (18 October 2025 – Present)

== Saints and causes for canonisation ==
- Servant of God Fr. Adeodatus (Muthiyavila Valiyachan)

== Diocesan Officials ==
S.No	Name	Designation
1.	Most. Rev. Msgr. Dr. Thomas J. Netto	Metropolitan Archbishop
2.	Rt. Rev. Dr. Vincent Samuel S.T.D.	Bishop
3.	Rt. Rev. Msgr. G. Christudas	Vicar General
4.	Very Rev. Msgr. D. Selvarajan	Judicial Vicar, Regional Co-ordinator
5.	Rev. Dr. Jose Raphael	Chancellor
6.	Very Rev. Msgr. V.P. Jose	Coordinator of Ministries
7.	Very Rev. Msgr. Rufus Pius Lean	Regional Co-ordinator
8.	Very Rev. Msgr. Vincent K Peter	Regional Co-ordinator
9.	Very Rev. Msgr. Alphonse Ligouri	Episcopal Vicar for Finance
10.	Rev. Fr. Alosious Sathyanesan S	Secretary of Senate
11.	Very Rev. Fr. Sabu Varghese	Finance Officer
12.	Rev. Fr. Chistopher Yasaya	Procurator
13.	Rev. Fr. Sujin S. Johnson	Secretary to the Bishop
