= Joseph Kureethara =

Indian bishop

His Excellency Joseph Kureethara
- 33rd Bishop of Cochin
- Diocese: Roman catholic Diocese of Cochin
- Appointed: 29 Aug 1975
- Installed: 21 December 1975
- Term ended: 6 January
- Predecessor: Alexander Edezath
- Successor: John Thattumkal

Orders
- Ordination: by Grégoire-Pierre XV (François) Cardinal Agagianian Patriarch of Cilicia (Armenian)
- Consecration: 21 Dec 1975 by Archbishop Joseph Kelanthara

Personal details
- Died: 6 Jan 1999
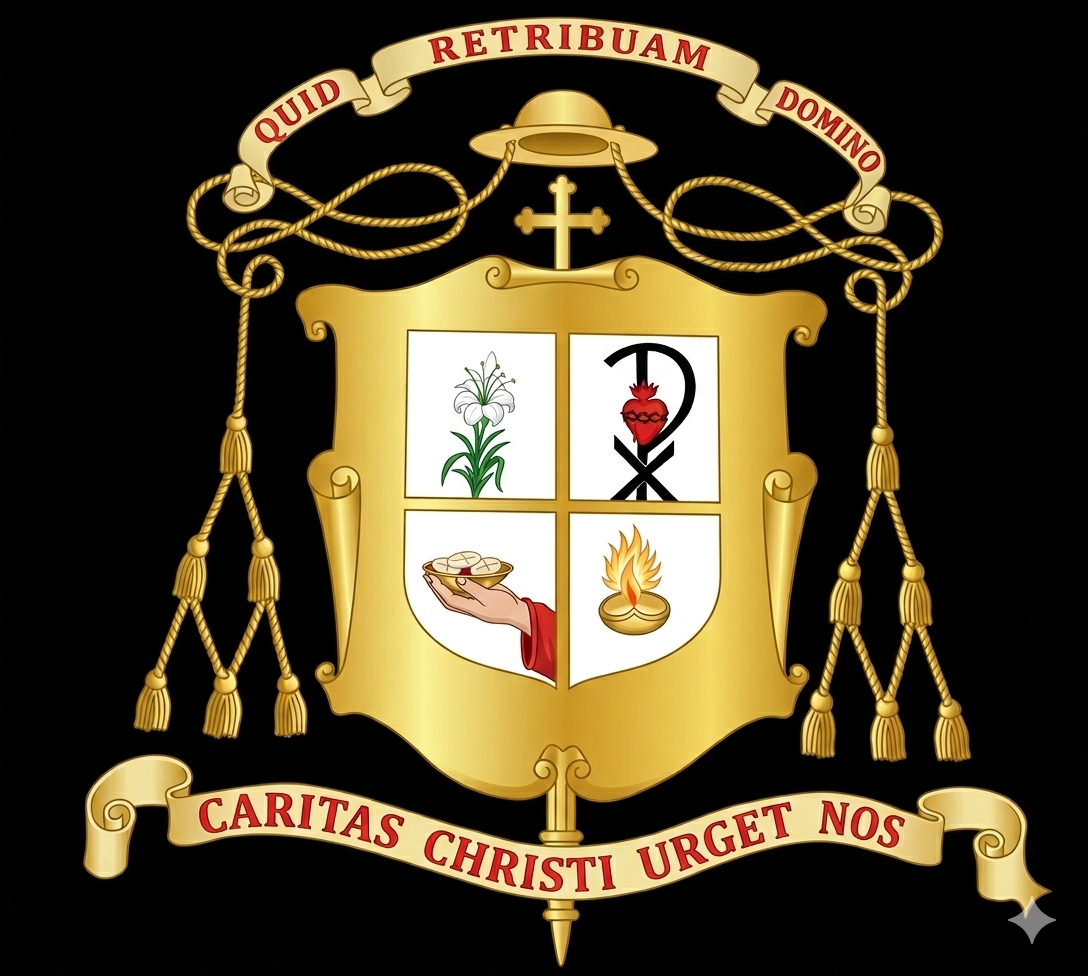
- Coat of arms

Styles of Joseph Kureethara
- Reference style: The Right Reverend
- Spoken style: The Right Reverend
- Religious style: Bishop
- Informal style: Cardinal
- See: Roman Catholic Diocese of Cochin (Emeritus)

Bishop Joseph Kureethara (2 July 1929 – 6 January 1999 in Palluruthy, Cochin) was the 33rd bishop of the Roman Catholic Diocese of Cochin.

Catholic Church titles
Preceded by Alexander Edezath	Bishop of Cochin; 1975–1999	Succeeded by John Thattumkal
