= List of CD Blocks in Kerala =

Kerala is divided into 152 Community Development (CD) Blocks for rural development and local administration. Each CD Block is coterminous with a Block Panchayat, the elected intermediate-level local government institution under the three-tier Panchayati Raj system. The following is the list of CD Blocks of Kerala:

== Overview ==
The Community Development (CD) Blocks are the field-level administrative units of the Rural Development Department (RDD) of the Government of Kerala. Each CD Block has a Block Development Office, also known as the Block Panchayat Office, headed by a Block Development Officer (BDO), who also serves as the Secretary of the corresponding Block Panchayat.

=== Block Council ===
Block panchayat is the elected governing body of the respective blocks. Each block panchayat consists of president and vice presidents and members, elected by the people.

== List ==
No	Name of the Block	Panchayats	District
1	Athiyanoor		Thiruvananthapuram
2	Chirayinkeezhu		Thiruvananthapuram
3	Pothencode		Thiruvananthapuram
4	Kilimanoor		Thiruvananthapuram
5	Nedumangad		Thiruvananthapuram
6	Nemom		Thiruvananthapuram
7	Parassala		Thiruvananthapuram
8	Perumkadavila		Thiruvananthapuram
9	Vamanapuram		Thiruvananthapuram
10	Varkala		Thiruvananthapuram
11	Vellanad		Thiruvananthapuram
12	Anchal		Kollam
13	Chadayamangalam		Kollam
14	Chavara		Kollam
15	Chittumala		Kollam
16	Ithikkara		Kollam
17	Kottarakkara		Kollam
18	Mukhathala		Kollam
19	Oachira		Kollam
20	Pathanapuram		Kollam
21	Sasthamkotta		Kollam
22	Vettikkavala		Kollam
23	Mallappally		Pathanamthitta
24	Pulikeezhu		Pathanamthitta
25	Koipuram		Pathanamthitta
26	Elanthoor		Pathanamthitta
27	Ranni		Pathanamthitta
28	Konni		Pathanamthitta
29	Pandalam		Pathanamthitta
30	Parakode		Pathanamthitta
31	Ambalapuzha		Alappuzha
32	Aryad		Alappuzha
33	Bharanicavu		Alappuzha
34	Champakulam		Alappuzha
35	Chengannur		Alappuzha
36	Haripad		Alappuzha
37	Kanjikuzhy		Alappuzha
38	Mavelikara		Alappuzha
39	Muthukulam		Alappuzha
40	Pattanakkad		Alappuzha
41	Thycattussery		Alappuzha
42	Veliyanad		Alappuzha
43	Erattupetta		Kottayam
44	Ettumanoor		Kottayam
45	Kaduthuruthy		Kottayam
46	Kanjirappally		Kottayam
47	Lalam		Kottayam
48	Madappally		Kottayam
49	Pallom		Kottayam
50	Pampady		Kottayam
51	Uzhavoor		Kottayam
52	Vazhoor		Kottayam
53	Vaikom		Kottayam
54	Adimaly		Idukki
55	Azhutha		Idukki
56	Devikulam		Idukki
57	Elamdesam		Idukki
58	Idukki		Idukki
59	Kattappana		Idukki
60	Nedumkandam		Idukki
61	Thodupuzha		Idukki
62	Alangad		Ernakulam
63	Angamaly		Ernakulam
64	Edappally		Ernakulam
65	Koovappady		Ernakulam
66	Kothamangalam		Ernakulam
67	Mulanthuruthy		Ernakulam
68	Muvattupuzha		Ernakulam
69	Palluruthy		Ernakulam
70	Pampakuda		Ernakulam
71	North Paravur		Ernakulam
72	Parakkadavu		Ernakulam
73	Vadavucode		Ernakulam
74	Vazhakulam		Ernakulam
75	Vypin		Ernakulam
76	Anthikkad		Thrissur
77	Chalakudy		Thrissur
78	Chavakkad		Thrissur
79	Cherpu		Thrissur
80	Chowannur		Thrissur
81	Irinjalakuda		Thrissur
82	Kodakara		Thrissur
83	Mala		Thrissur
84	Mathilakam		Thrissur
85	Mullassery		Thrissur
86	Ollukkara		Thrissur
87	Pazhayannur		Thrissur
88	Puzhakkal		Thrissur
89	Thalikulam		Thrissur
90	Vellangallur		Thrissur
91	Wadakkanchery		Thrissur
92	Alathur		Palakkad
93	Attappady (ITDP)		Palakkad
94	Chittur		Palakkad
95	Kollengode		Palakkad
96	Kuzhalmannam		Palakkad
97	Malampuzha		Palakkad
98	Mannarkad		Palakkad
99	Nenmara		Palakkad
100	Ottappalam		Palakkad
101	Palakkad		Palakkad
102	Pattambi		Palakkad
103	Sreekrishnapuram		Palakkad
104	Thrithala		Palakkad
105	Areacode	Areacode, Cheacode, Edavanna, Kavanur, Keezhparamba, Kuzhimanna, Pulpatta, Urangattiri	Malappuram
106	Kondotty	Chelembra, Cherukavu, Muthuvallur, Pallikkal, Pulikkal, Vazhakkad, Vazhayur	Malappuram
107	Kuttippuram	Amarambalam, Chokkad, Edappatta, Kalikavu, Karulai, Karuvarakundu, Thuvoor	Malappuram
108	Malappuram	Anakkayam, Kodur, Morayur, Othukkungal, Ponmala, Pookkottur	Malappuram
109	Mankada	Koottilangadi, Kuruva, Makkaraparamba, Mankada, Moorkanad, Puzhakkattiri	Malappuram
110	Nilambur	Chaliyar, Chungathara, Edakkara, Moothedam, Pothukal, Vazhikkadavu	Malappuram
111	Perinthalmanna	Aliparamba, Angadipuram, Elamkulam, Keezhattur, Melattur, Pulamanthole, Thazhekode, Vettathur	Malappuram
112	Perumpadappu	Alamcode, Maranchery, Nannamukku, Perumpadappu, Veliyancode	Malappuram
113	Ponnani	Edappal, Vattamkulam, Thavanur, Kaladi	Malappuram
114	Tanur	Cheriyamundam, Niramaruthur, Ozhur, Perumanna Klari, Ponmundam, Tanalur, Valavannur	Malappuram
115	Tirur	Purathur, Thalakkad, Thirunnavaya, Triprangode, Vettom, Mangalam	Malappuram
116	Tirurangadi	Moonniyur, Nannambra, Vallikkunnu, Thenhipalam, Peruvallur	Malappuram
117	Vengara	A.R. Nagar, Edarikode, Kannamangalam, Oorakam, Parappur, Thennala, Vengara	Malappuram
118	Wandoor	Mampad, Pandikkad, Porur, Thiruvali, Thrikkalangode, Wandoor	Malappuram
119	Kalikavu	Amarambalam, Chokkad, Edappatta, Kalikavu, Karulai, Karuvarakundu, Thuvoor	Malappuram
120	Balussery		Kozhikode
121	Chelannur		Kozhikode
122	Koduvally		Kozhikode
123	Kozhikode		Kozhikode
124	Kunnamangalam		Kozhikode
125	Kunnummal		Kozhikode
126	Meladi		Kozhikode
127	Panthalayani		Kozhikode
128	Perambra		Kozhikode
129	Thodannur		Kozhikode
130	Tuneri		Kozhikode
131	Vatakara		Kozhikode
132	Kalpetta		Wayanad
133	Sulthan Bathery		Wayanad
134	Mananthavady		Wayanad
135	Panamaram		Wayanad
136	Kannur		Kannur
137	Taliparamba		Kannur
138	Payyannur		Kannur
139	Edakkad		Kannur
140	Thalassery		Kannur
141	Kuthuparamba		Kannur
142	Iritty		Kannur
143	Irikkur		Kannur
144	Peravoor		Kannur
145	Panoor		Kannur
146	Kalliassery		Kannur
147	Manjeshwar		Kasaragod
148	Kasaragod		Kasaragod
149	Kanhangad		Kasaragod
150	Nileshwar		Kasaragod
151	Karadka		Kasaragod
152	Parappa		Kasaragod

== See also ==
- Administrative divisions of Kerala
