= Diocese of Punalur =

Roman Catholic diocese in Kerala, India

Coordinates: 9.0228°N 76.9209°E

Diocese of Punalur Dioecesis Punalurensis പുനലൂർ രൂപത
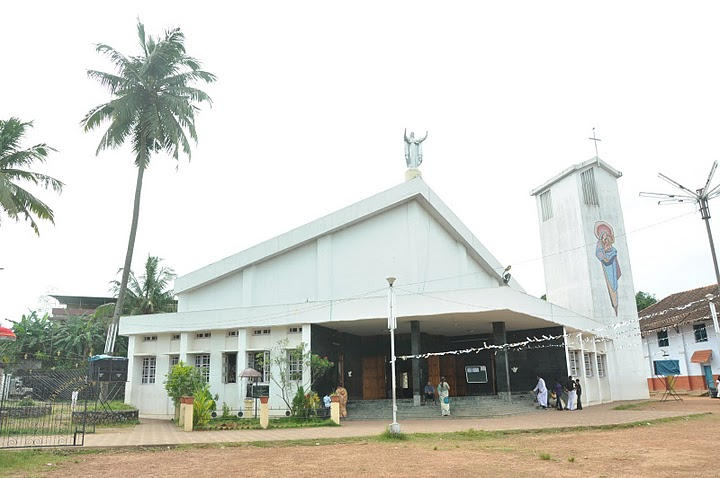
- St Mary's Cathedral in Punalur

Location
- Country: India
- Ecclesiastical province: Trivandrum
- Metropolitan: Trivandrum

Statistics
- Area: 5,052 km^{2} (1,951 sq mi)
- Population: Total; Catholics: (as of 2004); 2,482,100; 46,708 (1.9%)
- Parishes: 41

Information
- Denomination: Roman Catholic
- Sui iuris church: Latin Church
- Rite: Roman Rite
- Archdiocese: Roman Catholic Archdiocese of Trivandrum
- Cathedral: St. Mary's Cathedral, Punalur
- Patron saint: St Thérèse of Lisieux

Current leadership
- Pope: Leo XIV
- Bishop: Selvister Ponnumuthan
- Metropolitan Archbishop: Thomas J. Netto
- Vicar General: Vincent D’Cruz
- Episcopal Vicars: Johnson Joseph, Jude Thaddeus Ambattur

Website
- Website of the Diocese http://www.dioceseofpunalur.com/

The Roman Catholic Diocese of Punalur (Latin: Punaluren(sis)) is a diocese located in the city of Punalur in the ecclesiastical province of Trivandrum in India.

== History ==
- December 21, 1985: Established as Diocese of Punalur from the Diocese of Quilon

Belgian Carmelite missionaries were the First Fathers of Punalur and of places around Punalur. During the Second World War the First Fathers had to go back, entrusting the church work to the diocesan clergy of Quilon (Kollam).

Punalur was separated from the Diocese of Quilon (Kollam) and created into a separate unit by the Bull “Verba Christi” of Pope John Paul II, issued on 21 December 1985.

== Territory ==
Present Diocese of Punalur extended to the entire taluks of Punalur, Pathanapuram, Kottarakkara, Kunnathur, Mavelikara, Adoor, Konni, Pathanamthitta, Kozhencherry, and several pakuthies of the taluks of Karunagappally, Karthikapally, and Chengannur.

== Leadership ==
- Bishops of Punalur (Roman Church)
  - Bishop Selvister Ponnumuthan (May 8, 2009 – present)
  - Bishop Joseph Kariyil (March 12, 2005 – May 8, 2009)
  - Bishop Mathias Kappil (December 21, 1985 – March 12, 2005)
