= Mother of God Church, Vettukad =

Church in Kerala, India

Madre de Deus Church
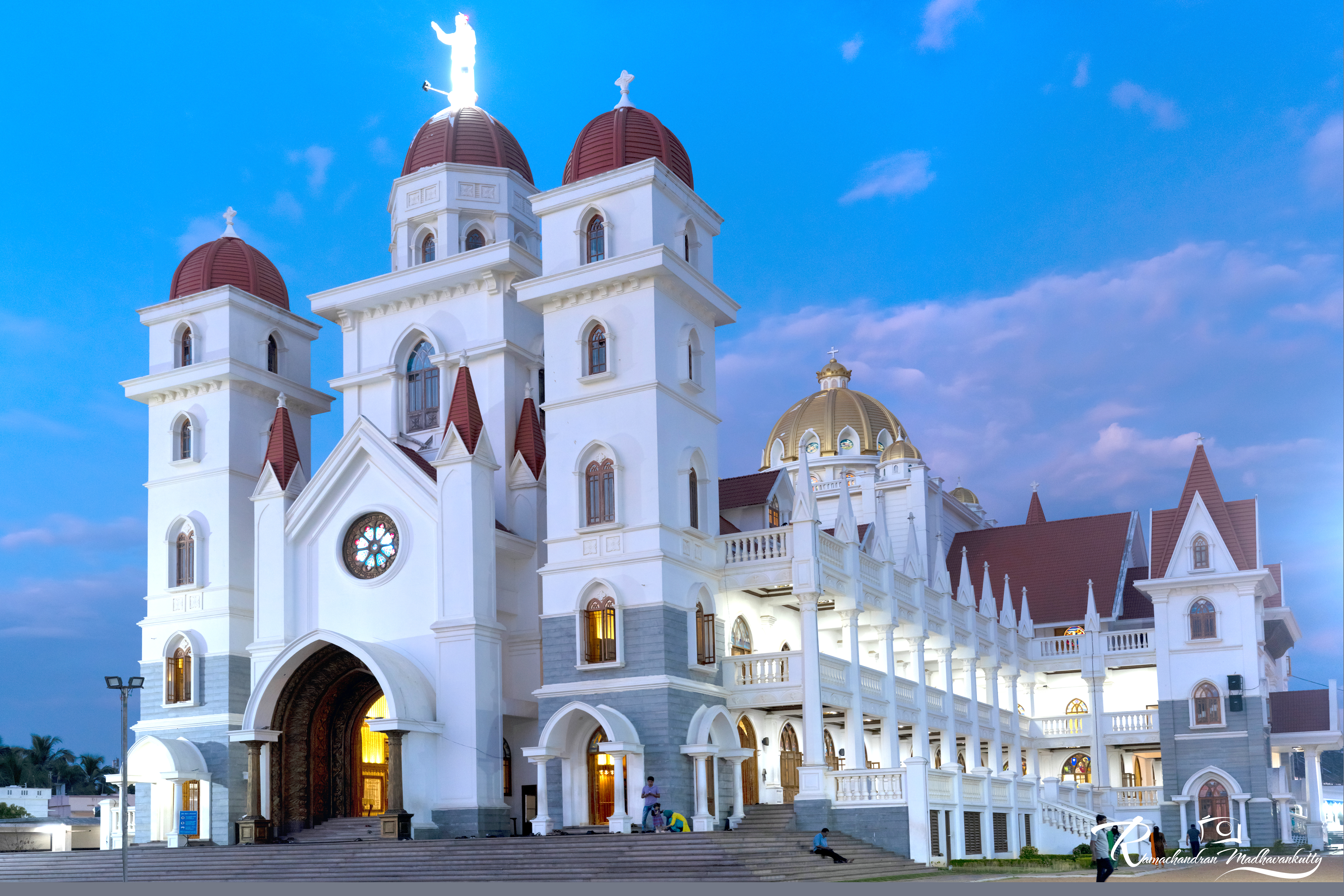
- Madre de Deus Church
- Madre de Deus Church
- 8.49418°N 76.90021°E
- Address: Veli Sanghumugham Rd, Balanagar, Vettucaud, Thiruvananthapuram, Kerala 695021
- Country: India
- Denomination: Catholic Church
- Sui iuris church: Latin Church
- Website: https://vettucaudchurch.com/

History
- Status: Parish church
- Founded: 1544 AD
- Founder: Francis Xavier
- Dedication: Christ the king

Architecture
- Architect: MA Sebastian
- Architectural type: Roman, Gothic, Byzantine, and Indian

Administration
- Archdiocese: Roman Catholic Archdiocese of Trivandrum.

Clergy
- Priest: Rev. Dr. Edison YM

The Madre de Deus Church, also known as the Mother of God Church ("mother of God" in Portuguese/Latin), is a church located in Vettukad in Kerala, India's Thiruvananthapuram district. The church is located nearby the Trivandrum International Airport and has a beautiful view of the Vettukad sea.
