= Valiathura =

Valiathura Raithura or Rajathura
- suburb
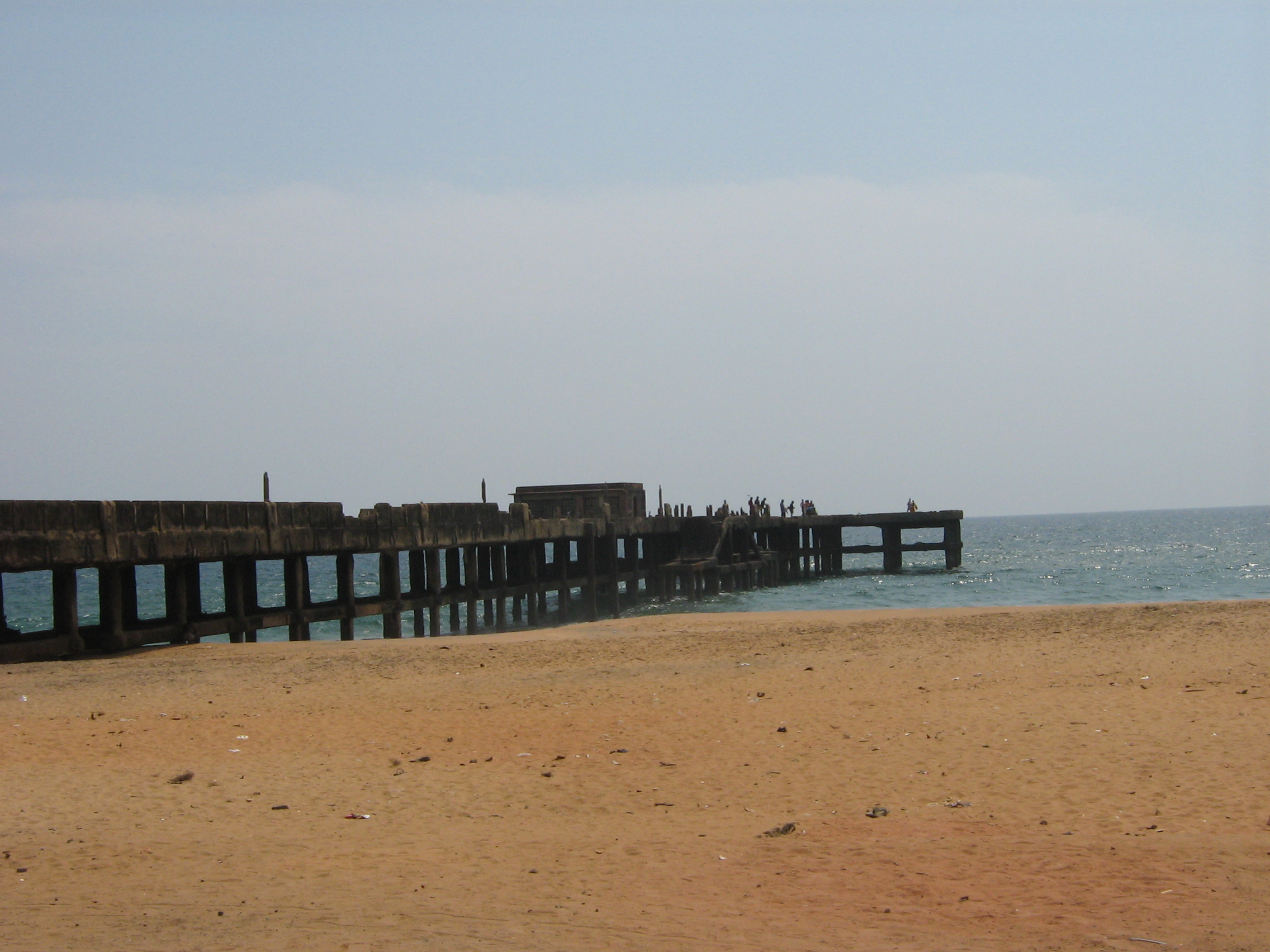
- Valiathura pier

- Location in Kerala, India
- Coordinates: 8°27′47″N 76°55′27″E
- Country: India
- State: Kerala
- District: Thiruvananthapuram
- Established: 1956
- Founder: Kingdom of Travancore

Languages
  - Official: Malayalam, English
- Time zone: UTC+5:30 (IST)
- PIN: 695008
- Telephone code: 0471
- Vehicle registration: KL-01
- Nearest city: Thiruvananthapuram
- Lok Sabha constituency: Thiruvananthapuram West

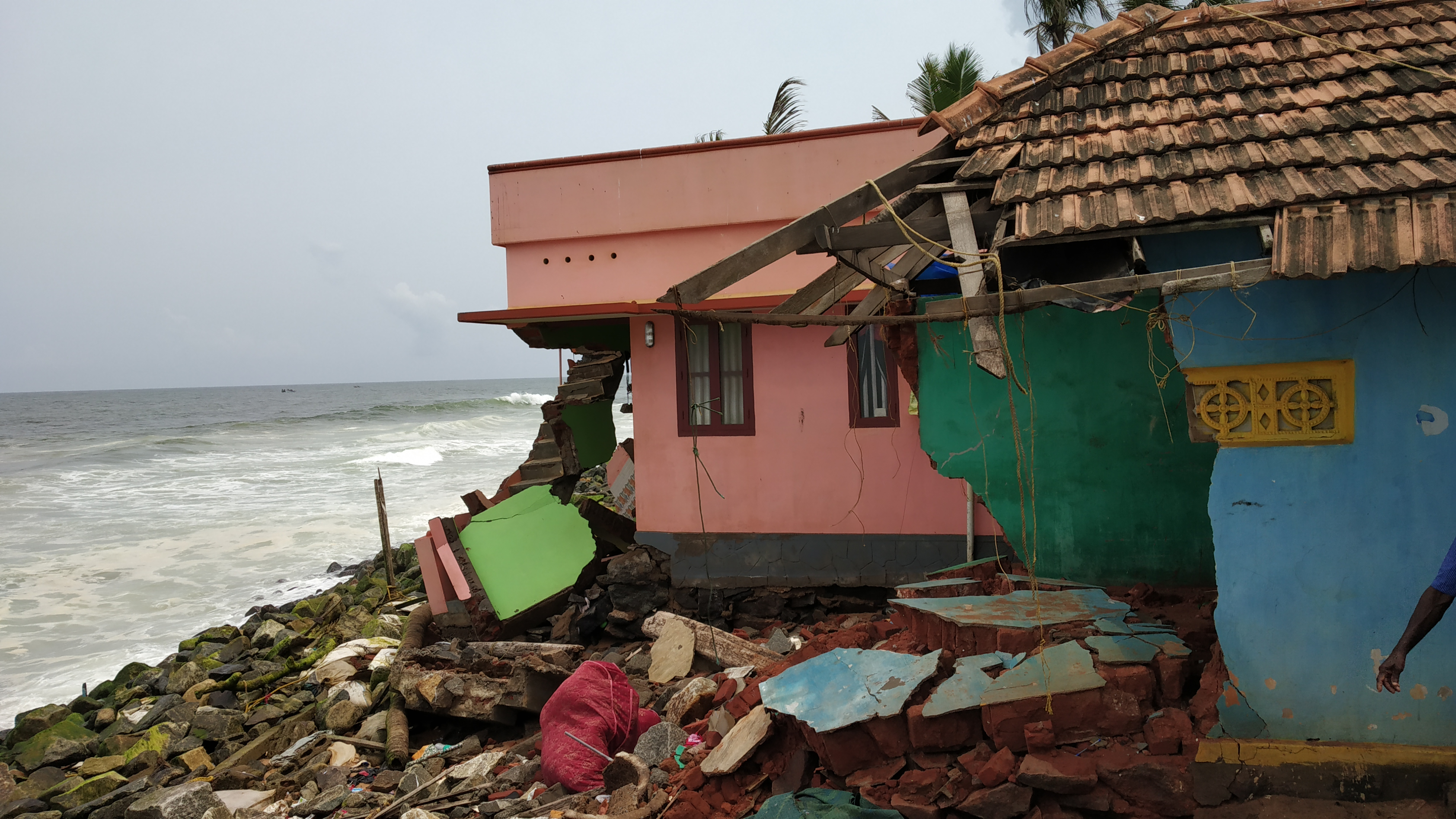
Sea erosion at Valiyathura

Valiathura was a major port of Thiruvananthapuram city, the capital of Kerala, India. It is one of the oldest ports in India. This was once the only port along the South Kerala coast. When Kochi became the prominent port in Kerala, Valiathura lost its significance as a major port. Now, Valiathura is considered as a fishing port.

== Geography ==
It is located near Shankhumugham. It is a typical coastal region. The vegetation consists mainly of coconut trees. The land is higher in Valiathura, so calamities due to the monsoon tides are less compared to the other nearby coastal regions.

== History ==
Valiyathura was known as Raithura or Rajathura from the time of the Travancore kingdom, but its history goes beyond this; from the time of King Solomon Valiathura port was active and used to export spices and articles. Saint Antony's Cathedral has a history of more than 500 years and the New Year Day celebration started more than 120 years ago. At the battle between Marthanda Varma and Ettuveetil Pillai, one of the pillai and his soldiers were protected by the fisher people of Valiathura and some of those people married a few Valiathura girls and settled in Valiathura.

== Valiathura Pier ==
Valiathura is famous for its pier. The 60-year-old, 703-foot (214 m) pier and the godowns (warehouses) behind it are a far cry from the past, when up to 50 cargo ships used to call here at a time. Opened in 1956 by the advisor to the Rajapramukh Dr. P.S. Rau, it was the only port along the South Kerala coast.

Supported by 127 concrete piles, the pier had four 3-tonne cranes and one 10-tonner to unload cargo from the ships. Since the pier was located in shallow waters, heavy ships had to anchor in the deep sea and transport their ware in smaller boats. With the development of the Kochi port with facilities for berthing of huge cargo ships, Valiathura lost its significance. It was declared a 'dead port' in the early 1980s.

All five cranes were dismantled and sold as scrap as disuse and constant exposure to salty winds eroded their structure. The four godowns were rented out to industrial units on the Veli belt. The rails used by trolleys to transport cargo to the godowns have rusted away.

The pier which consumed 571 tonnes of cement and 250 tonnes of steel, cost about 1,000,000 rupees to build. Till today, the fishermen along the coast use the weakened structure to launch their catamarans during the rough monsoon months, when the rough sea makes the beaches inaccessible. They then jump into the sea and swim to the catamarans.

Waves here very rarely fall below one metre, and often exceed four metres during the monsoon period of May to October.

There are many anglers who occupy strategic points on the pier, holding on to their line patiently waiting to hook a fish. Avoiding sophisticated angling gear, these people use their hands to hold the line instead of the angling rod. The anglers here are mostly labourers and daily-wage workers.

The hooks range from 18 to 24 on a single line. There are also hooks that do not need any bait on them. But these should be regularly pulled and loosened in the water in order to attract prey. As the water current is towards the shore, the anglers need something to take the line down to the waters. For this, they use iron weights attached to the line, which provides the thrust while the line is thrown into the sea.

Malavu, a fish that visits the coastline occasionally from inland waters, is another temptation for the anglers. Para, kanava and kozhiyala are among the other visitors that swim into the trap.

A few years ago, one of the weakened piles on the right head of the 60-years-old pier developed a crack leading to the collapse of a platform measuring about 20 square feet (1.9 m^{2}). And on 8 July, a portion of the sidewall gave in to the powerful waves lashing the structure and plunged into the sea.

Currently visitors are prohibited from going out on Valiathura pier. In 2007, the Harbour Engineering Department announced a project for its reconstruction.

== St. Antony’s Forane Church ==
St. Antony’s Forane Church Valiathura was established in 1530 by Franciscan missionaries. Valiathura has more than seven centuries of Christian heritage. In the 13th century, Pope Innocent IV sent a few Franciscan and Dominican missionaries to Kollam, Mampally and Valiathura to proclaim the Gospel.

The geographical boundary of Valiathura Parish till the beginning of 20th century extended from Shangumugham to Beemapally in the south. Later, the parish was bifurcated for administrative convenience. Consequently, the parishes of St. Ann’s Church Valiathope; Assumption Church Cheriyathura; St. Xaviers Church Valiathura and finally Fatima Matha Church Kochuthope came into existence. The famous pilgrim center Madre de Deus Church Vettukad is part of Valiathura Forane.

== Pilgrim Centre ==
Madre De Deus Church Vettukad, is the major pilgrim centre coming under Valiathura Forane.

== Location ==
Valiathura is 5 km from the city centre. Privately owned and KSRTC buses ply from East Fort. Autorickshaws can also be hired.

A bypass of National Highway 66 passes 1 km to the east of Valiathura. The nearest railway station is Thiruvananthapuram Central, around 8 km away.

Shangumugham Beach and Beemapally Mosque are tourist attractions nearby.

== Economy ==
Fishing was the main livelihood for the people of the seashore. But most people work abroad in countries like Sri Lanka, Burma, Malaysia, Maldives, Singapore, Iran and other Middle East countries. Many hundreds of Valiathura youth have joined the Indian Army, Air Force, Navy, ISRO, VSSC, Travancore Titanium Products Ltd. Indian Airport Authority, banks, schools and many Government and Private owned organizations. Many medical doctors, engineers, pilots, scientist, police officers, politicians and social workers are born and raised up in Valiathura.

== Educational Institutions ==
Educational institutions in Valiathura are St. Antony's Higher Secondary School, St. Antony's Lower Primary School, Government Regional Fisheries High School, Government UP School and Government LP School. There are also more than eight private educational institutes serving students.

== People and Culture ==
The people of Valiathura are mainly Christians from various denominations like Latin Catholics, Roman Catholics, Syrian Catholics, CSI and a few number of Pentecostals, Hindus and Muslims are minorities.

The People of Valiyathura trace back their history more than 500 years. Many Valiyathura people are from the background of Portuguese, Dutch, Spanish and English, and can be identified with their surnames such as Pereira, Voiz, Culas, Fernandez, Silva, Neto, Lopez, Francis, and so on.

Valiyathura was the most civilized Coastal Area from the time of Travancore Kingdom.
