= Vettucaud =

- Suburb
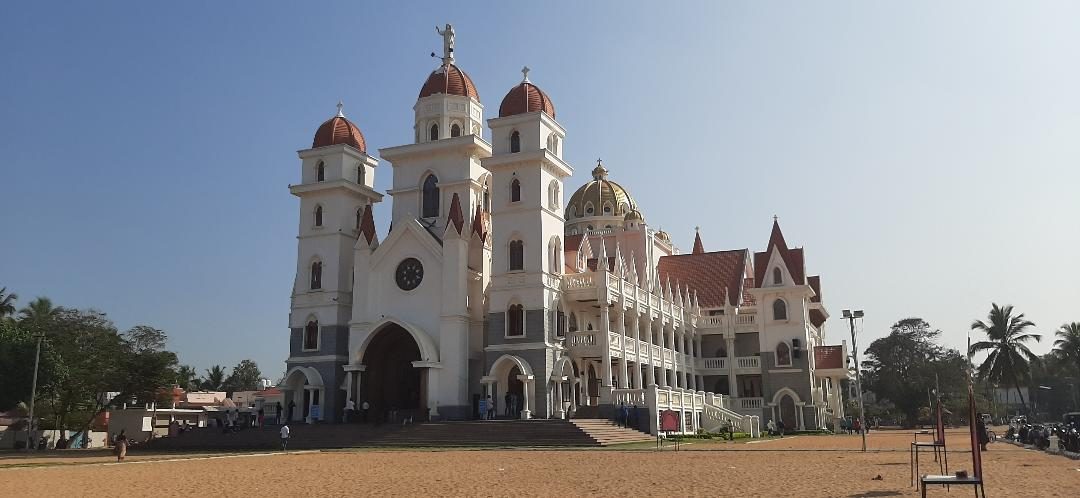
- Madre-de-Deus Church

- Location in Kerala, India
- Coordinates: 8°29′0″N 76°54′0″E
- Country: India
- State: Kerala
- District: Thiruvananthapuram

Languages
  - Official: Malayalam, English
- Time zone: UTC+5:30 (IST)

Vettucaud is located on the north-west coast of Thiruvananthapuram. The Madre De Deus Church (Mother of God Church) is situated in Vettucaud. This church is popularly known as Vettucaud Palli.

The annual feast of the church called the Feast of Christ the King is attended by thousands of devotees. The feast is celebrated in the month of November. The last day of the feast is celebrated on the third Sunday of November every year. The grand feast is attended by thousands of devotees and is celebrated with a procession through the parish boundaries.

Vettucuad is located 3 km north of Shanghumugham Beach and 5 km from the Thiruvananthapuram International Airport.

Old Vettucaud Church
