= St. Mary's Cathedral, Punalur =

Cathedral in Punalur, India

St. Mary's Cathedral is the first church in the centuries-old history of this industrial town Punalur, on the banks of Kallada river. Catholics and Christian faithful working in Punalur Paper Mills, Railway and Rubber Estates along with the farmers were the early community of the church. Schools, orphanage, mission centers and other institutions start building gradually to meet the growing demands of the community of vibrant ethnic culture.

== History ==
Christian Missionaries serving among the people made thatched sheds on the hillock near the market and Kallada River. One of the thatched sheds used as Church during 1866 was the first Church of Punalur established by the Belgian Carmelite missionaries. The Church was named after 'Mother of Good Counsel'(St. Mary) and liturgies of the Church were in Latin. St. Mary's Church was rebuilt with granite structure during 1933 and remodelled with concrete structure during 1997.

Belgian Carmelite missionaries were the First Fathers of Punalur and of places around Punalur. During the Second World War the First Fathers had to go back, entrusting the church work to the diocesan clergy of Quilon (Kollam).

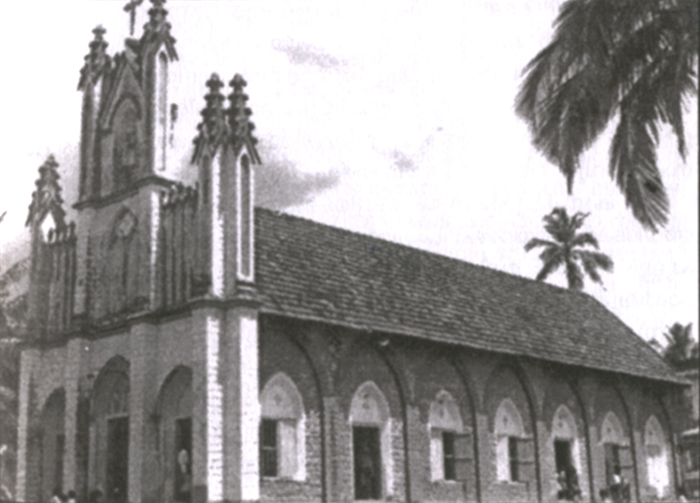
History Page of St. Mary's Church

Punalur Diocese was separated from the Diocese of Quilon (Kollam) and created into a separate unit by the Bull “Verba Christ” of Pope John Paul II, issued on 21 December 1985.

Present Diocese of Punalur extended to the entire civil district of Pathanamthitta, taluks of Kottarakkara, Kunnathur, Mavelikara and several pakuthies of the taluks of Karunagappally and Chengannur.

== Location ==
St Mary's Cathedral complex is located on west bank hillock of Kallada River, north of Kollam-Shenkottai railway route, east of Paper Mill Road and near to Punalur railway Station at coordinates 9.022766°N 76.920796°E

== Images ==
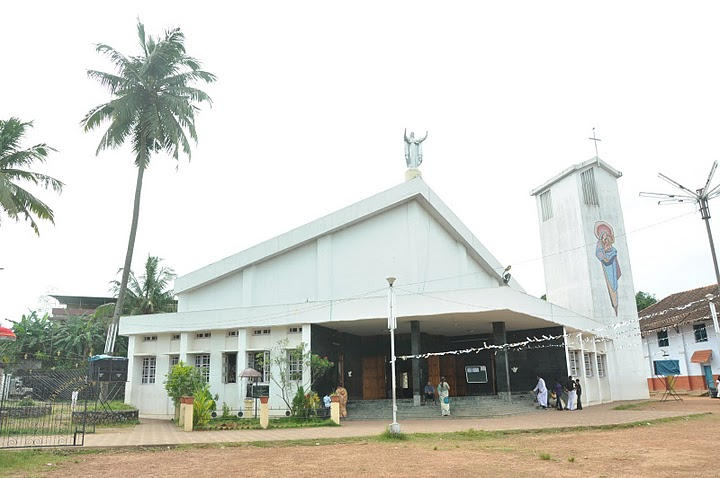

== See also ==
- Roman Catholic Church
- Diocese of Punalur
