= St. Joseph's Cathedral, Trivandrum =

St. Joseph's Metropolitan Cathedral
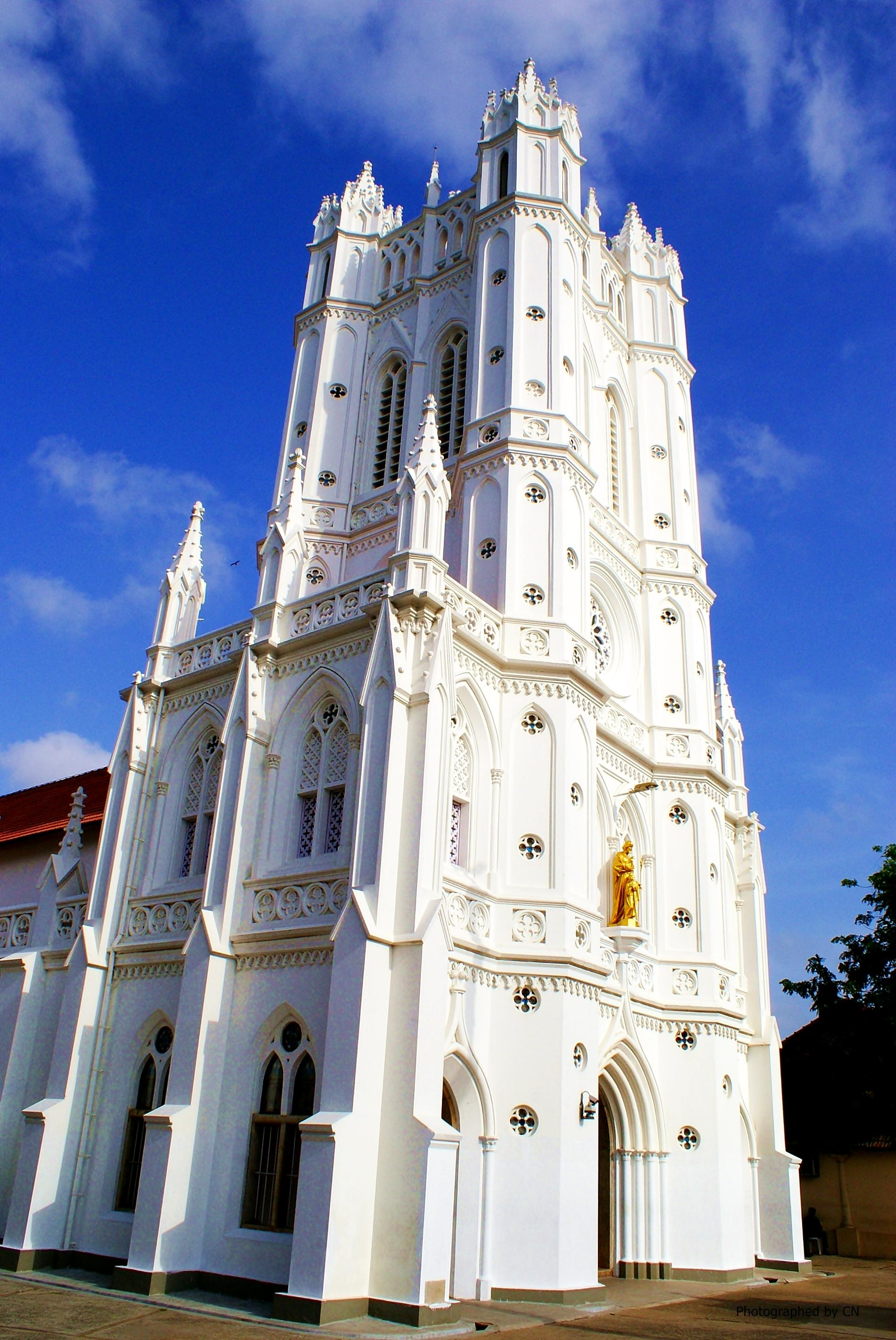
- St. Joseph's Metropolitan Cathedral
- 8.504311°N 76.951571°E
- Location: Palayam, Thiruvananthapuram
- Country: India
- Denomination: Roman Catholic
- Website: www.stjosephmetropolitancathedraltrivandrum.org

History
- Status: Cathedral
- Founded: 4 May 1873; 153 years ago
- Dedication: Saint Joseph
- Events: Papal visit, 1986

Architecture
- Functional status: active
- Style: Gothic

Administration
- Province: Archdiocese of Trivandrum
- Archdiocese: Archdiocese of Trivandrum

Clergy
- Archbishop: Most Rev. Dr. Thomas J. Netto

St. Joseph's Metropolitan Cathedral, also known as Palayam Palli, is the Roman Catholic Latin Rite cathedral of the Archdiocese of Trivandrum. The first church was built here in 1873. The church was intended in the manner of a cross in 1912. The final stage of extension, including the Gothic style facade and the bell-tower was completed in 1927. The three bells were brought from Belgium and were named Joseph, Xavier, and Aloysius in honour of, respectively, Saint Joseph, the patron of the church; Saint Francis Xavier, the apostle of India; and Bishop Aloysius Maria Benziger, the pioneer missionary-bishop of Quilon. Upon the bifurcation of the Diocese of Quilon, the new Diocese of Trivandrum was formed on 1 July 1937, and St. Joseph's Church became the cathedral of the newly formed diocese. When the diocese was raised to a metropolitan archdiocese in 2004, the cathedral became a metropolitan cathedral. The cathedral has a statue of its patron St. Joseph with the Child Jesus in the middle of the facade and a statue of Jesus with hands raised atop the tower. The church which is white in colour was painted red from 1927 to 2010. It was renovated during the period 2008 to 2010.

== Gallery ==
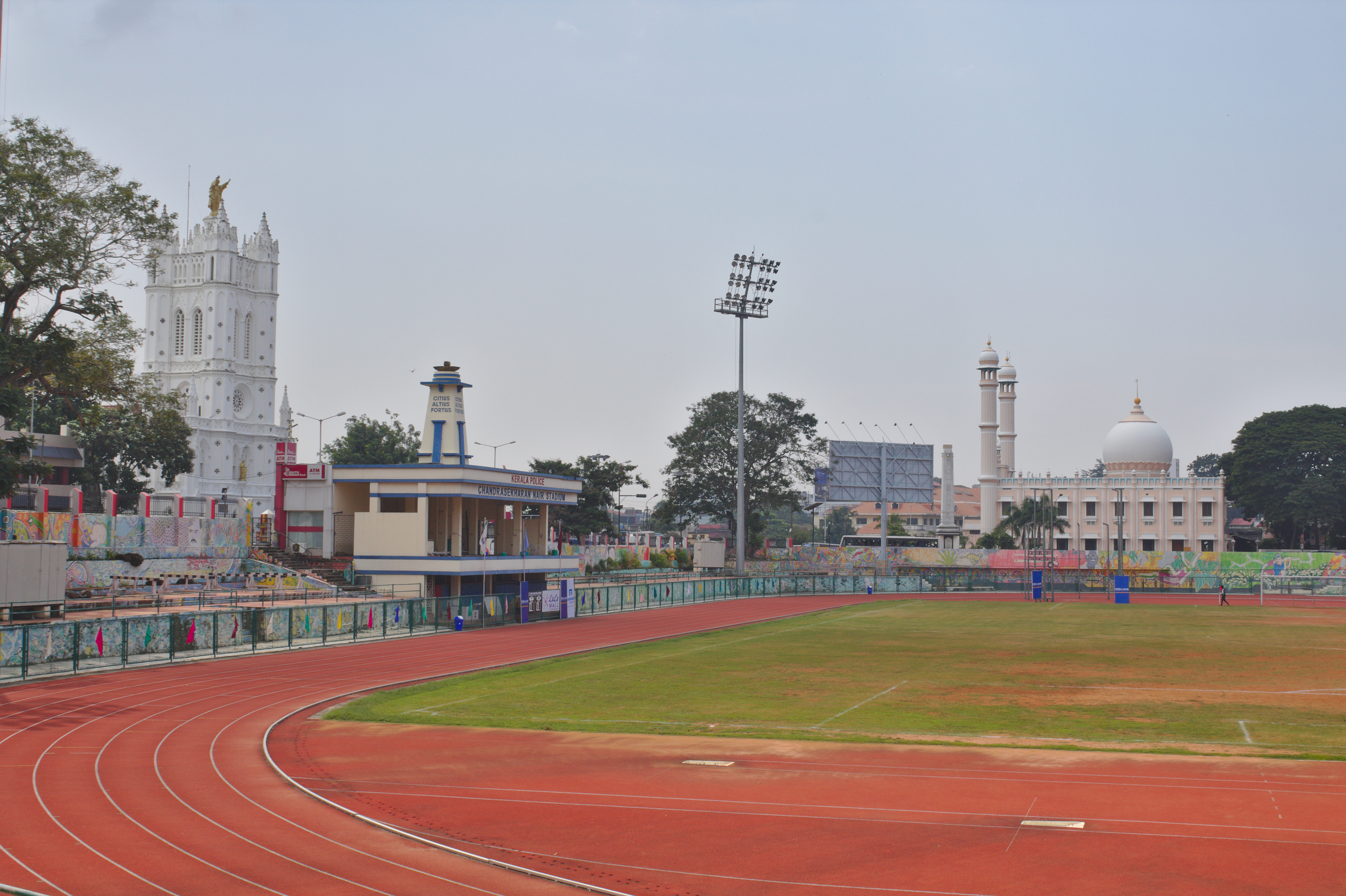
Palayam Juma Mosque and St.Joseph's Cathedral as seen from Chandrashekharan Nair Stadium

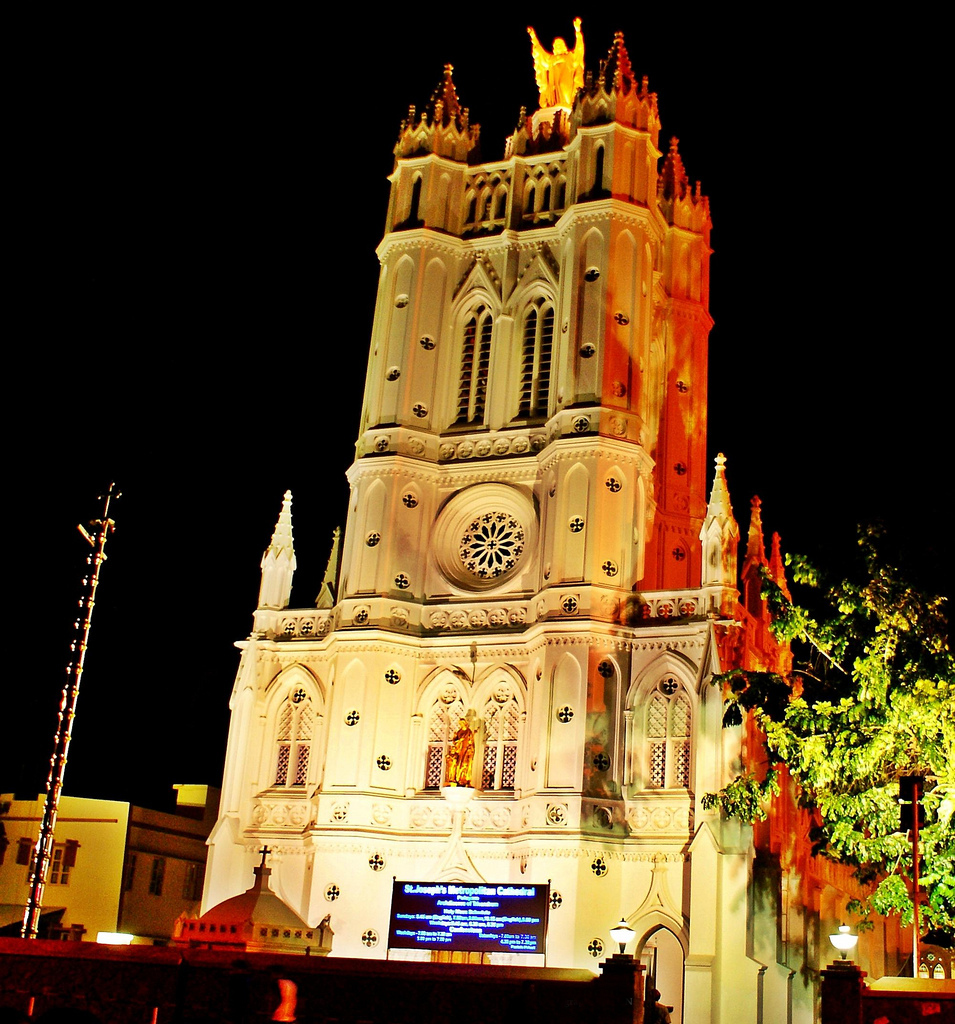
St. Joseph's cathedral at night

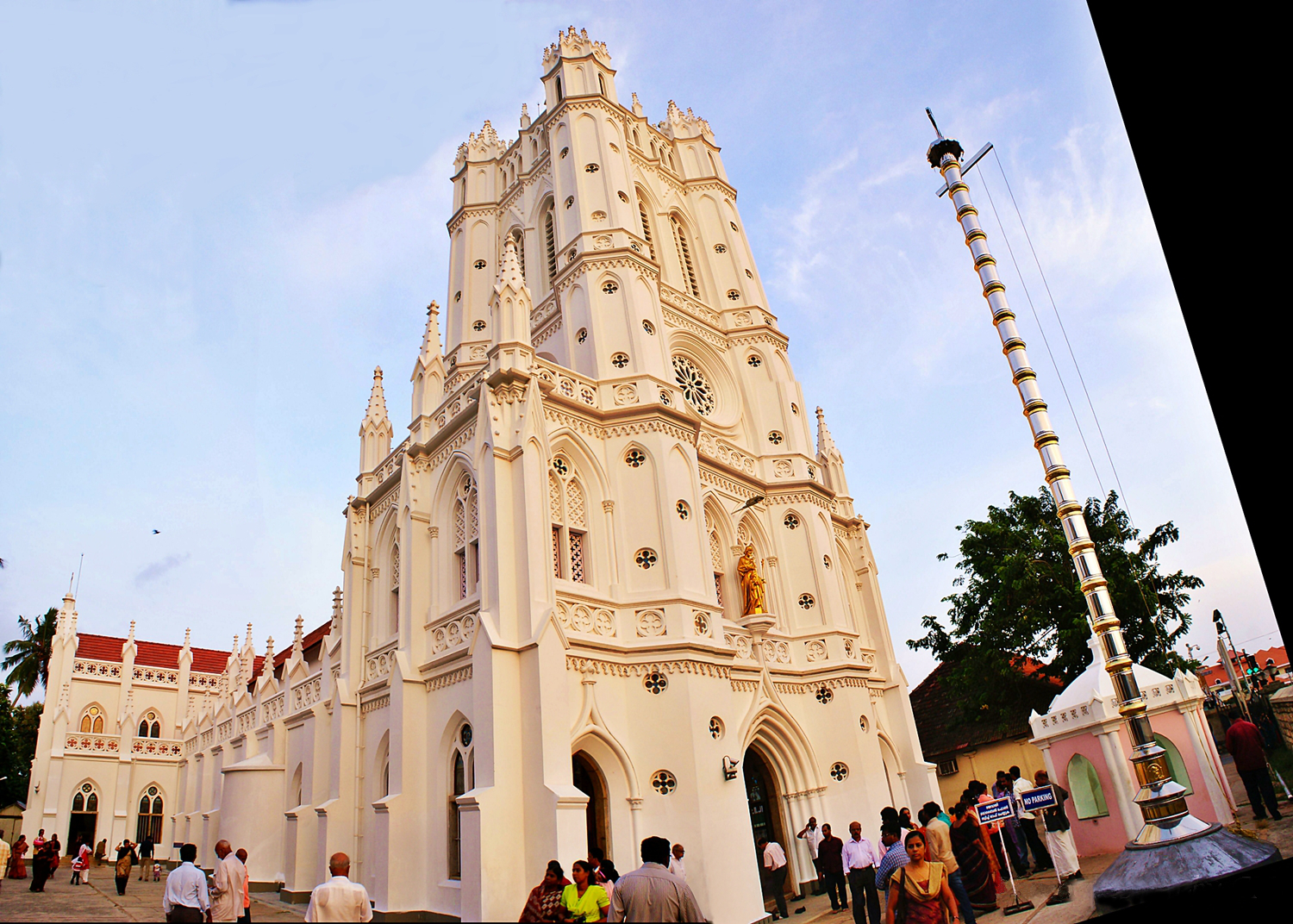
St. Joseph's cathedral, with dwajasthambam in front of the church

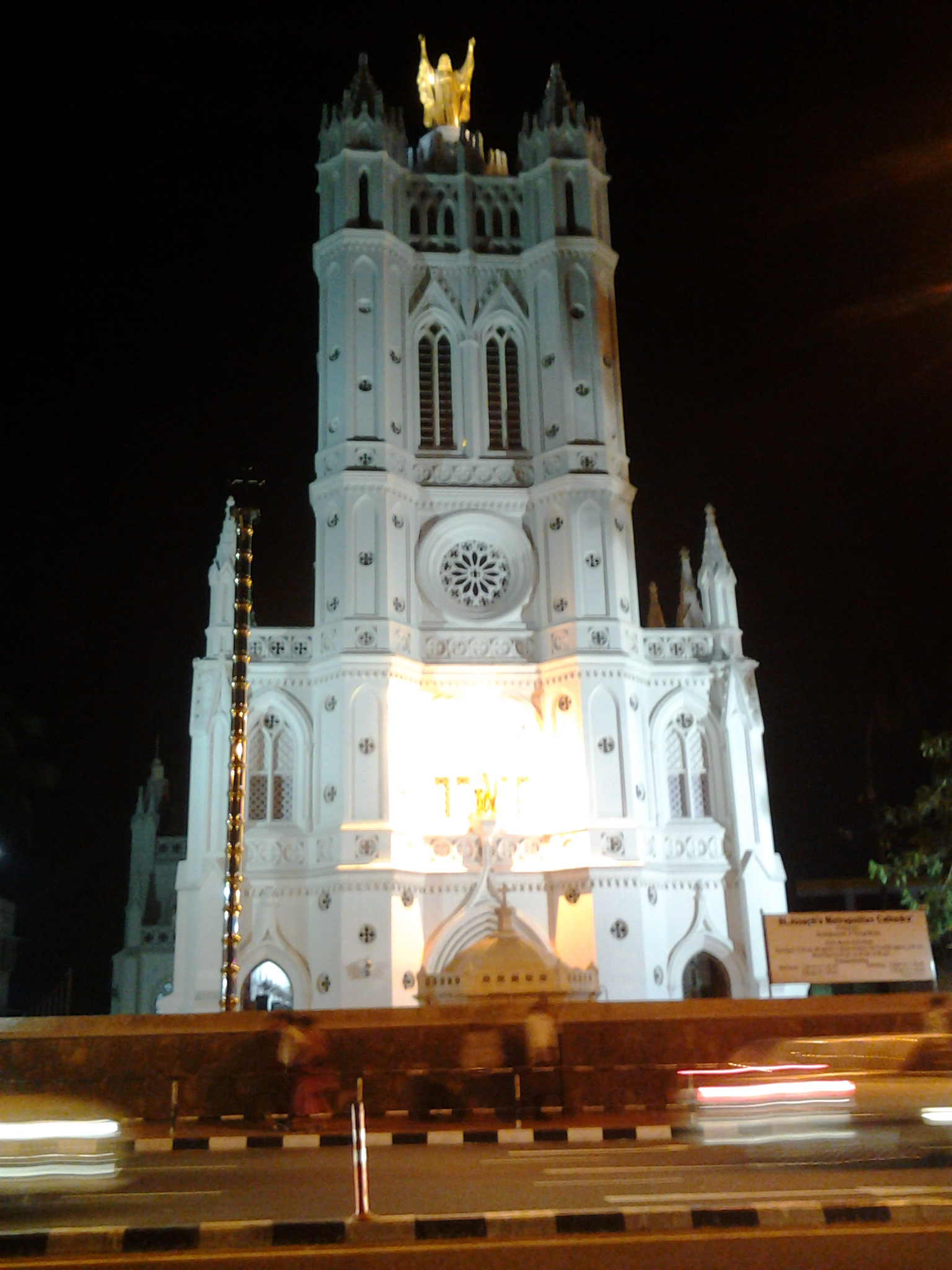
St. Joseph's cathedral at night from across the road

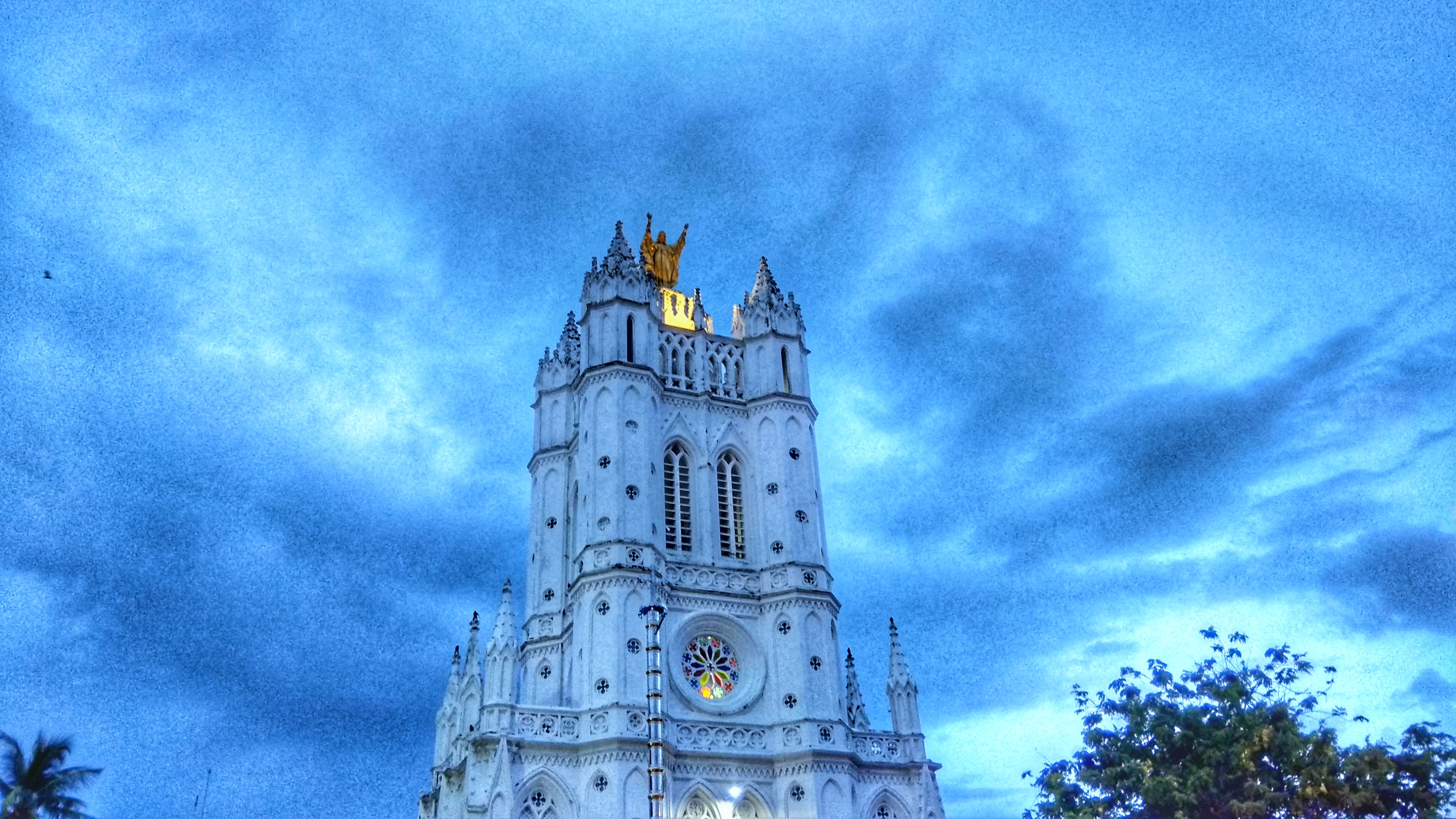
St. Joseph's Metropolitan Cathedral Palayam - Thiruvananthapuram
