= Peter B. Pereira =

Indian Roman Catholic bishop

Peter Bernard Pereira
- Bishop of Trivandrum
- Church: Catholic Church
- Diocese: Diocese of Trivandrum
- In office: 1 October 1966 – 13 June 1978
- Predecessor: Vincent Victor Dereere
- Successor: Benedict Jacob Acharuparambil
- Previous posts: Coadjutor Bishop of Trivandrum (1961-1966); Titular Bishop of Urusi (1955-1966); Auxiliary Bishop of Trivandrum (1955-1961)

Orders
- Ordination: 25 March 1944
- Consecration: 24 August 1955 by Vincent Victor Dereere

Personal details
- Born: 21 June 1917 Murukkumpuzha (southwest of Thonnakkal), Kingdom of Travancore, British Empire
- Died: 13 June 1978 (aged 60)

Peter Bernard Pereira (21 June 1917 – 13 June 1978) was the Second Bishop of the Roman Catholic Archdiocese of Trivandrum, and was its first Indian bishop.
