= John Thattumkal =

Indian RC bishop (born 1950)

His Excellency John Thattumkal SSC
- 34th Bishop of Cochin
- Church: Roman Catholic Church
- Diocese: Roman Catholic Diocese Of Cochin
- Appointed: 10 May 2000
- Installed: 25 Jun 2000
- Term ended: 8 May 2009
- Predecessor: Joseph Kureethara
- Successor: Joseph Kariyil

Orders
- Consecration: 25 Jun 2000 by Archbishop Daniel Acharuparambil

Personal details
- Born: 23 Jun 1950
- Motto: Honouring The People Of God

John Thattumkal SSC (born 23 June 1950 in Vallethodu, Kodamthuruth, Kochi, India) was the Catholic bishop of Cochin from 2000 to 2009 before his retirement. He is a member of the Priestly Society of St. Joseph Benedict Cottolengo.

Catholic Church titles
Preceded by Joseph Kureethara	Bishop of Cochin; 2000–2009	Succeeded by Joseph Kariyil
