= Soosa Pakiam =

Indian archbishop

His Grace Archbishop Emeritus Maria Callist Soosa Pakiam
- Archbishop Emeritus of Trivandrum
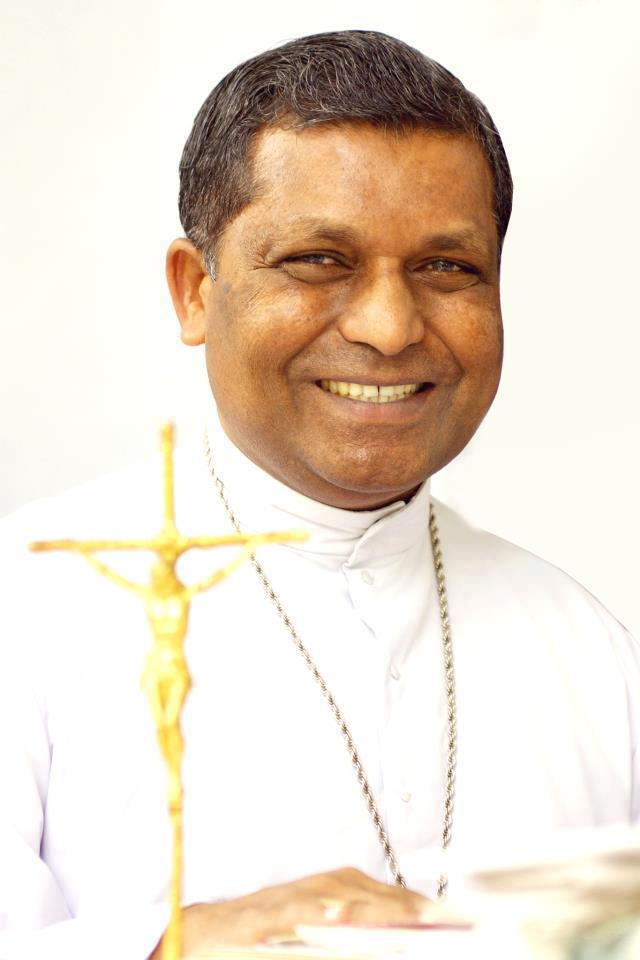
- Archbishop Maria Callist Soosa Pakiam
- Archdiocese: Trivandrum
- Province: Thiruvananthapuram
- See: Trivandrum
- Predecessor: Rt. Rev. Dr. Jacob Acharuparambil OFM Cap
- Successor: Most Rev. Dr. Thomas J. Netto
- Other post: President of Kerala Catholic Bishop Council (2016-2019)

Orders
- Ordination: 20/12/1969
- Consecration: 02/02/1990 by Archbishop Cornelius Elanjikal

Personal details
- Born: 11 March 1946 (age 80) Marthandanthurai
- Residence: St. Vincent's Seminary, Karamoodu, Mangalapuram, Trivandrum

Styles of Maria Callist Soosa Pakiam
- Reference style: His Grace
- Spoken style: Your Grace
- Religious style: Archbishop Emeritus
- Posthumous style: None

Ordination history of Maria Callist Soosa Pakiam
History
Priestly ordination
- Ordained by: Bishop Peter Bernard Pereira
Episcopal consecration
- Consecrated by: Archbishop Cornelius Elanjikal

Maria Callist Soosa Pakiam (born 11 March 1946) is the Archbishop Emeritus of the Latin Rite Archdiocese of Trivandrum.

== Biography ==
Born in Marthandanthurai village of Kanyakumari district in Tamil Nadu, Maria Calista Soosa Pakiam alias M. Soosa Pakiam was ordained as a Priest on 20 December 1969 at the age of 23. Pope John Paul II named him coadjutor bishop of Thiruvananthapuram in December 1989.

He was consecrated as a bishop on 2 February 1990 and took over from Emeritus bishop Rev. Dr. Jacob Acharuparambil as Bishop of Thiruvananthapuram in January 1991. He became the first metropolitan Archbishop of newly erected Thiruvananthapuram archdiocese On 23 June 2004.

Soosa Pakiam has headed the KCBC and Kerala region Latin catholic bishop council.

On 22 February 2021, Soosa Pakiam unofficially retired due to ailing health and Auxiliary Bishop Christudas Rajappan took over his duties. On 2 February 2022, Pope Francis officially accepted Soosa Pakiam's resignation and named Dr. Fr. Thomas J. Netto as the archbishop of Trivandrum.

== Course of School studies (where and When) ==
Lower Primary	St.Aloysius, Marthandanthura	Year	1950
Upper Primary	St.Aloysius, Marthandanthura	Year	1955
Middle School	St.Aloysius, Marthandanthura	Year	1955-1958
High School	St.Joseph's H.S., Trivandrum	Year	1958-1961
Minor Seminary	St.Vincent's Seminary, Palayam	Year	1958 – 1963
Major Seminary (Philosophy)	St.Joseph's Pontifical Seminary, Alwaye, Carmelgiri.	Year	1963 – 1966
Major Seminary (Theology)	St.Joseph's Pontifical Seminary, Mangalapuzha, Alwaye	Year	1966 – 1970
Ordination	St.Joseph's Cathedral, Palayam, Tvm	Year	20.12.1969
Higher Studies	Liturgical Institute and Biblical Institute, Rome	Year	1972 – 1977
Degrees	S.Th.L.L.,S.S.L.,Rome	Year	

== Position Held ==
sl.no.	Field of Activity	Year
1	Assistant Warden, Catholic Hostel, Palayam	1970 April – July
2	Vicar Co-operator, Vlathankara	16.07.1970 – 24.05.1971
3	Prefect, St.Vincent's Seminary, Palayam	24.05.1971 – 12.09.1972
4	Vicarius Substitutes of the parishes of Poovar,Karinkulam and Kochuthura	1972 April – May
5	Parish Priest of Thycaud	13.11.1977 – 01.05.1979
6	Director of Orientation Centre	13.11.1977 – 23.06.1978
7	Diocesan Director of Communication Media	13.11.1977 – 01.05.1979
8	Diocesan Director of Biblical Apostolate,Catechism and Sacred Liturgy	23.11.1977 – 01.05.1979
9	Spiritual Father of St.Vincent's Seminary, Palayam	23.06.1978 – 01.05.1979
10	Spiritual Father of St.Joseph's Pontificial Seminary, Mangalapuzha, Alwaye	15.05.1979 – 17.05.1986
11	Spiritual Father of St.Joseph's Pontificial Seminary, Mangalapuzha, Alwaye	15.05.1979 – 17.05.1986
11	Professor of Sacred Liturgy and Scripture, St.Joseph's Pontifical Seminary, Mangalapuzha, Alwaye	01.06.1979 – 17.05.1986
12	Rector, St.Vincent's Seminary, Kazhakuttom	17.05.1986
13	Diocesan Consultor	12.01.1988
14	Diocesan Director of Priestly Training	01.08.1988
15	Nominated Co-adjutor bishop of Trivandrum (Latin) by Pope John Paul II	02.12.1989
16	Appointed Apostolic Administrator of the diocese of Trivandrum	13.01.1990
17	Date of Episcopal Ordination (Consecration)	02.02.1990
18	Appointed Bishop of Trivandrum	31.01.1991
19	Chairman for Catechetical Commission of (KCBC) Kerala Catholic Bishop's Conference	1995 -1998
20	Chairman, Commission for the Ministry of Word and Worship of (CCBI) Catholic Conference Bishop of India	1997 – 2003
21	Chairman, Commission for the Ministry of Word and Worship of (KRLCBC)Kerala Regional (Latin) Catholic Bishop's Conference	1997 – 2003
22	Member, Seminary Commission of (KCBC) Kerala Catholic Bishop's Conference	1990 – 1997
23	Chairman, Commission for Anti-Alcoholism of KCBC (Kerala Catholic Bishop's Conference)	1998 - 2005
24	Chairman, Jubilee 2000 of KCBC (Kerala Catholic Bishop's Conference)	1999 – 2000
25	Member in ICEL (International Committee for English Liturgy)	1999 – 2002
26	Vice President of KRLCBC (Kerala Regional (Latin) Catholic Bishops Conference)	2002 – 2007
27	Chairman of Laity Commission in KRLCBC (Kerala Regional (Latin) Catholic Bishops Conference)	2002 – 2009
28	Chairman of the Laity Commission in CBCI (Catholic Bishops Conference of India)	2002 – 2004
29	Member of the FABC Commission for Laity	2003 -2005
30	Appointed first Metropolitan Archbishop to the newly erected Archdiocese of Trivandrum (Latin)	17.06.2004
31	President of KRLCBC (Kerala Regional (Latin) Catholic Bishops Council)	2009-2019
32	President,(KCBC) Kerala Catholic Bishops’ Conference	2016 - 2019
33	Retired as the Metropolitan Archbishop of Trivandrum	02.02.2022
34	Apostolic Administrator of the Archdiocese of Trivandrum	02.02.2022-19.03.2022
