= Mathias Kappil =

Indian clergyman and bishop

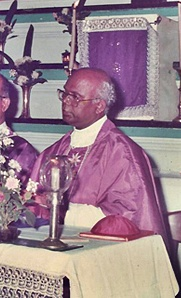
Image of Mathias Kappil

Mathias Kappil (born 21 January 1928 in Kallada – 24 February 2007) was an Indian clergyman and bishop for the Roman Catholic Diocese of Punalur. He became ordained in 1954. He was appointed bishop in 1985. He died on 24 February 2007, at the age of 79.
