= Amsom =

Village in Kerala, India

An amsom is a partition of a village in India particularly in Kerala. It is an administrative unit under an officer known as Adhikari. Often amsoms are understood as villages.

In India, states are divided into many districts. Districts are also divided into panchayat. In each panchayat there are many villages. Villages are divided into amsoms. Each village contains two to eight amsoms.
