= Alexander Edezath =

Indian Roman Catholic bishop

His Excellency Alexander Edezath
- 32nd Bishop of Cochin
- Diocese: Roman catholic Diocese of Cochin
- Appointed: 19 June 1952
- Installed: 7 December 1952
- Term ended: 29 August 1975
- Predecessor: José Vieira Alvernaz
- Successor: Joseph Kureethara

Orders
- Consecration: 7 Dec 1952 by Manuel Cardinal Gonçalves Cerejeira

Personal details
- Died: 21 August 1979

Styles of Alexander Edezath
- Reference style: The Right Reverend
- Spoken style: The Right Reverend
- Religious style: Bishop

Alexander Edezath (26 October 1904 - 21 August 1979) was a Roman Catholic bishop. Born in Kumbalangi, he was the 32nd bishop of the Roman Catholic Diocese of Cochin from 19 June 1952 until 29 August 1975.

Catholic Church titles
Preceded by José Vieira Alvernaz	Bishop of Cochin; 1952–1975	Succeeded by Joseph Kureethara
