= Palayam, Thiruvananthapuram =

Palayam
- Neighbourhood
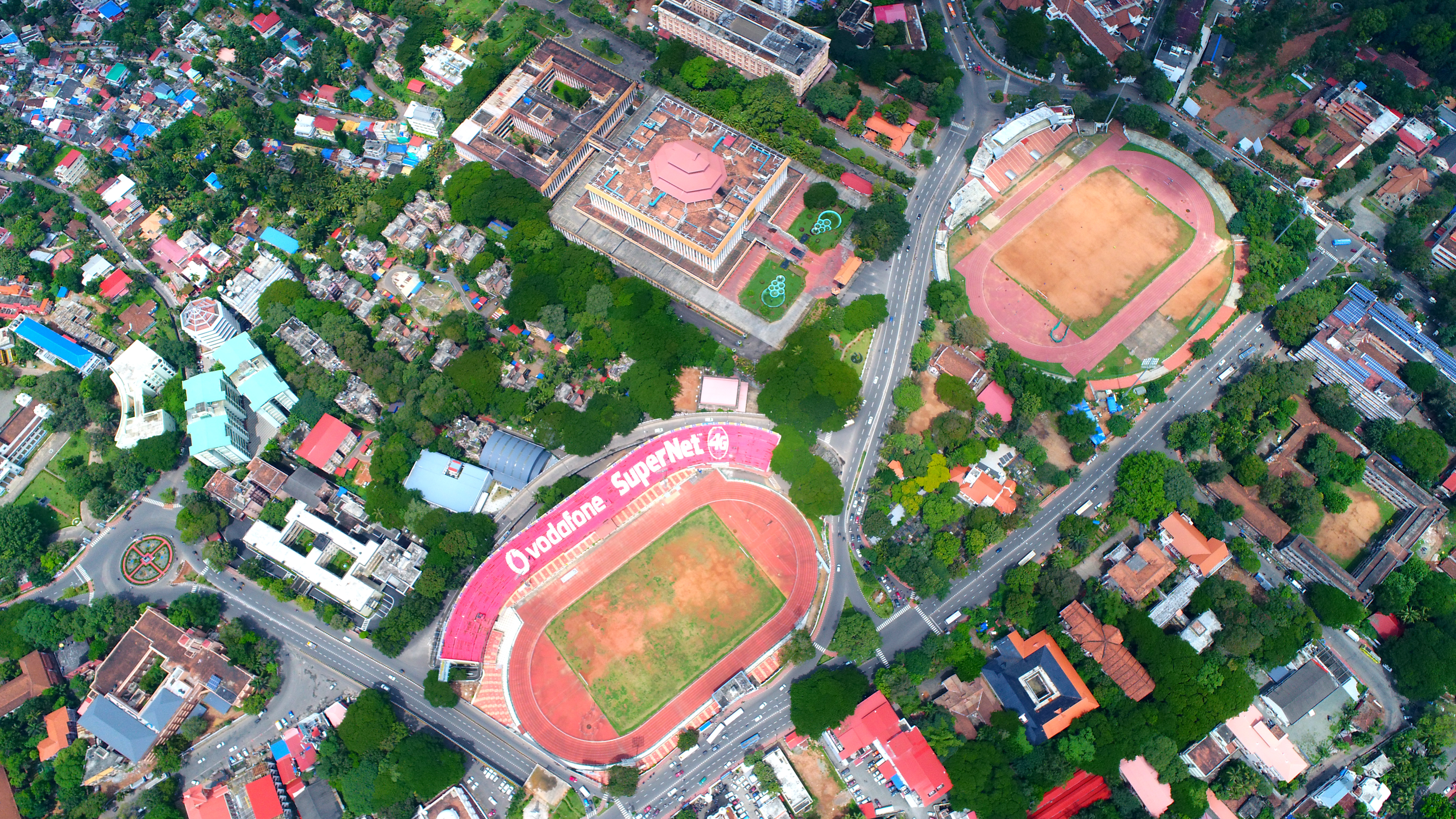
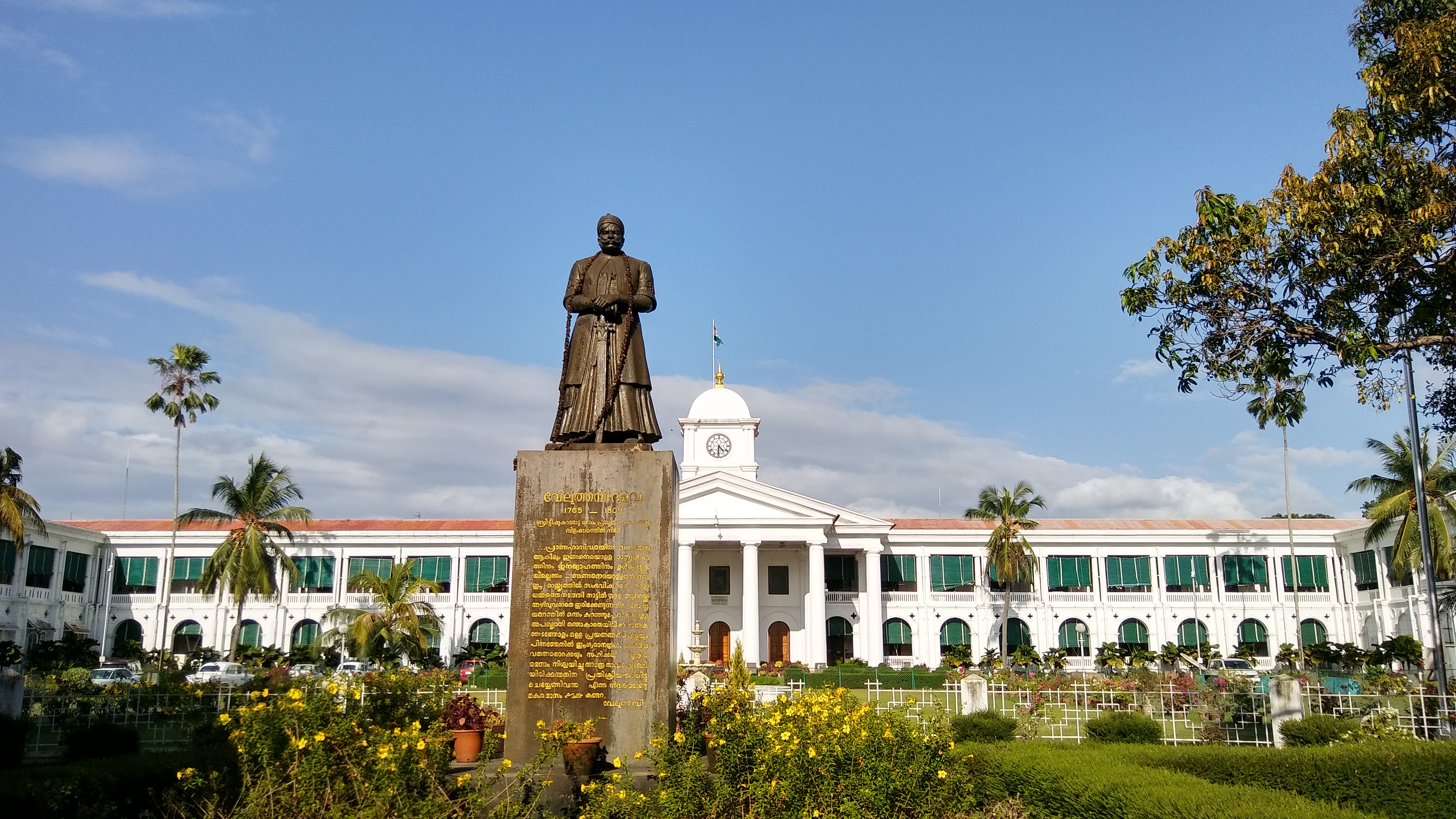
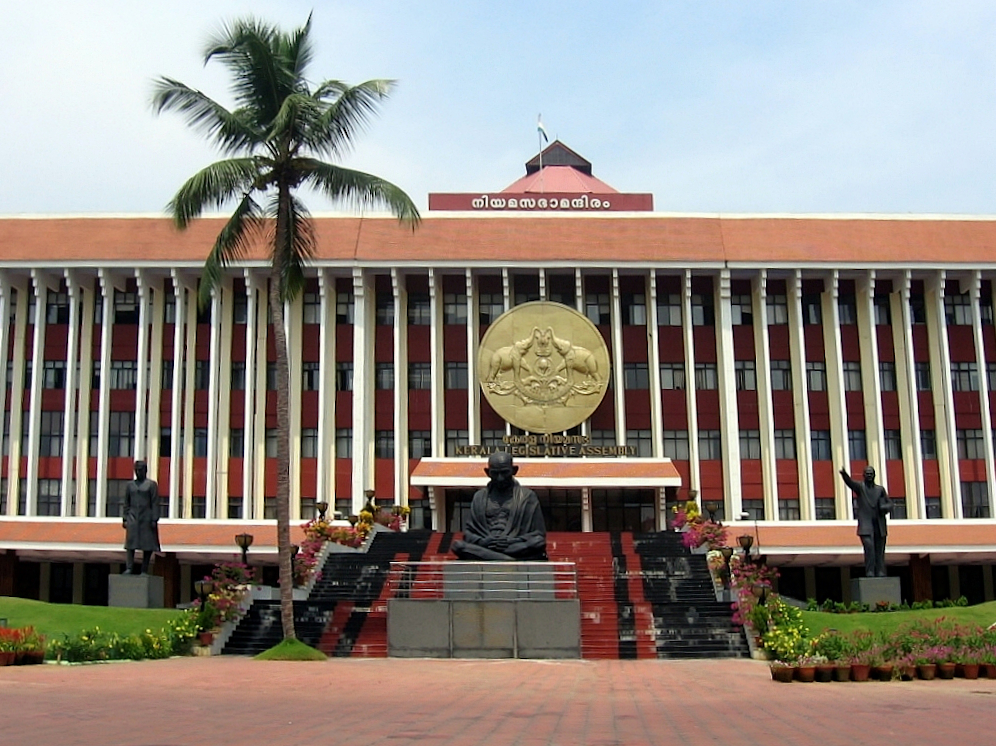
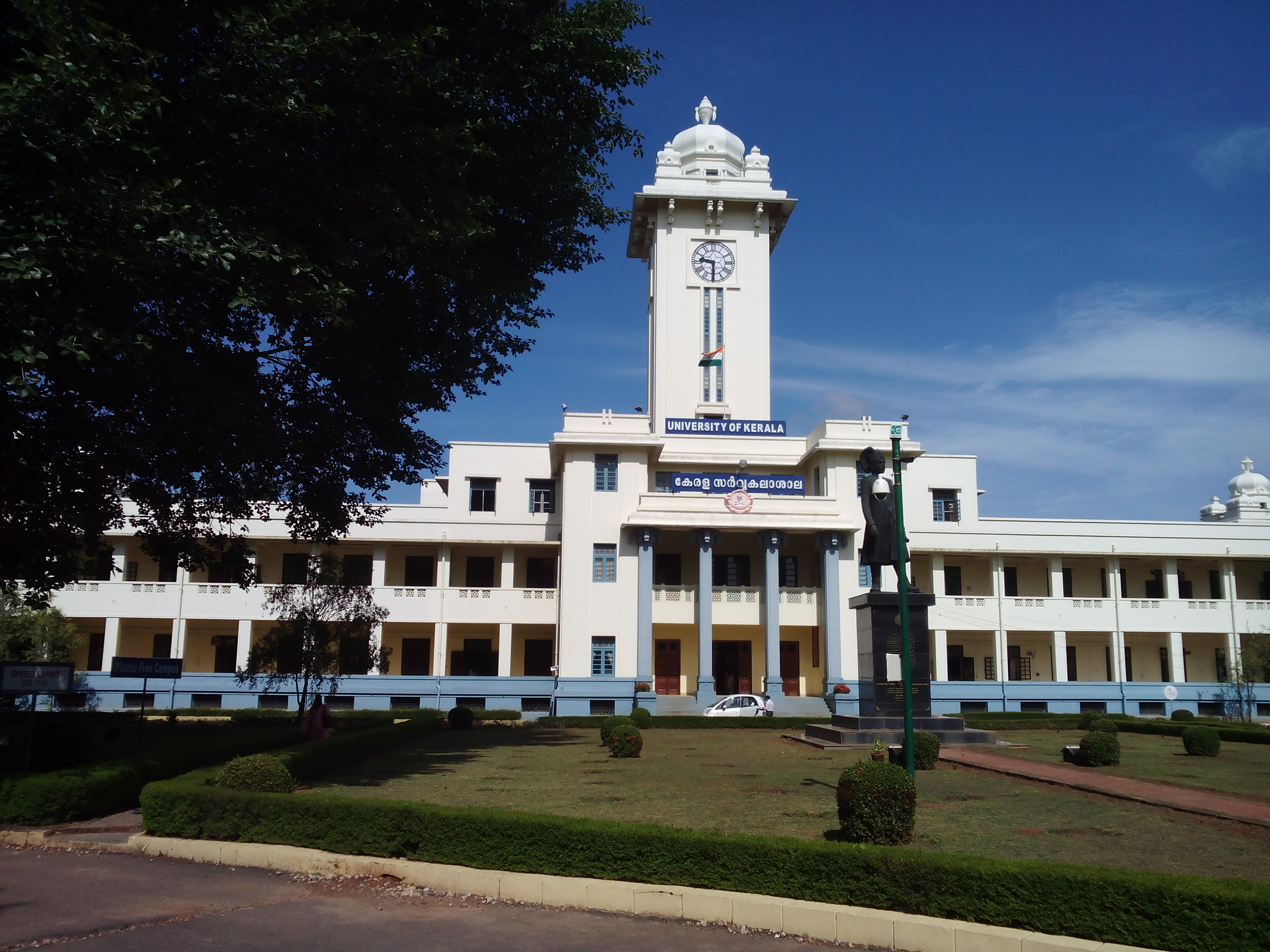
- Aerial View of Palayam Kerala Government Secretariat Kerala Legislative Assembly University of Kerala

- Location in Kerala, India
- Coordinates: 8°30′16″N 76°57′01″E
- Country: India
- State: Kerala
- District: Thiruvananthapuram

Languages
  - Official: Malayalam, English
- Time zone: UTC+5:30 (IST)
- PIN: 695033, 695001
- Telephone code: 0471
- Vehicle registration: KL-01

Palayam or Cantonment, as it is locally known, one of the busiest localities in Thiruvananthapuram, the capital of Kerala State in India. It is home to Thiruvananthapuram rural police headquarters and other administrative offices.

The name "Cantonment" is not much in use for the area, though that name is still associated with the police station near the Secretariat, "Cantonment Police Station". At present, "Cantonment House" serves as the official residence of the Leader of the Opposition.

== Religious confluence ==
The Palayam Juma Mosque, St. Joseph's Latin Cathedral or Palayam Palli and a temple dedicated to Lord Ganesh are situated close to each other. The co-existence of these three centres of worship of different religions is notable for the region.

St. Joseph's Cathedral is under the Latin Archdiocese of Thiruvananthapuram .

It is a major shopping area of the city. Offices of the University of Kerala, Legislative Assembly, hostel of the Members of the Legislative Assembly, Jubilee Memorial Hospital, Connemara Market and Saphalyam Shopping Complex are at Palayam.

Other attractions in and nearby Palayam include Central stadium, Thiruvananthapuram Zoo, Napier museum and Kerala State Science and Technology Museum.

Palayam is an emerging real estate hub, with premium builders Parka Homes, Asset Homes Sovereign, Sapphire Apartments etc. coming up in the area.

Restaurants serving Arabian cuisine like Shawarma and Kabsa and multi-cuisine ones are many in number.

Connemara Market

Also known as Palayam Market, Connemara Market was established by Lord Connemara, Governor of Madras. Saphalyam Shopping Complex and many other shops such as Shoe Wagon, Lee are situated here. Connemara Market is going to be renovated into a big shopping complex and 3-star hotel by next 4 or 5 years.
