= Thomas Jessayyan Netto =

Archbishop Of Trivandrum

His Grace, The Most Reverend, Monsignor. Archbishop Dr. Thomas Jessayyan Netto
- Metropolitan Archbishop of Trivandrum
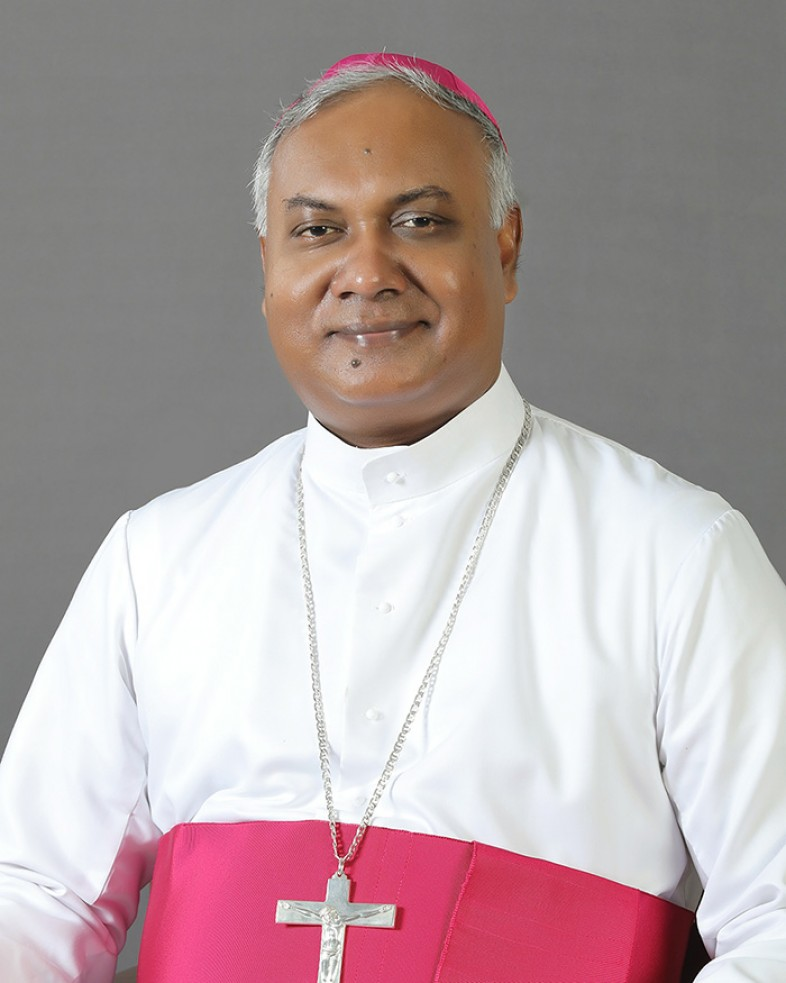
- Archbishop Thomas J. Netto
- Church: Roman Catholic Church
- Archdiocese: Trivandrum
- Province: Thiruvananthapuram
- Appointed: 2 February 2022
- Installed: 19 March 2022
- Predecessor: Soosa Pakiam

Orders
- Ordination: 19 December 1989
- Consecration: 19 March 2022 by Soosa Pakiam

Personal details
- Born: Thomas Jessayyan Netto; 29 December 1964 (age 61) Puthiyathura
- Denomination: Roman Catholic
- Residence: Thiruvananthapuram, India
- Parents: Father: Jessayyan Netto; Mother: Isabella Netto
- Education: Loyola College Trivandrum; Pontifical Urbaniana University Rome
- Motto: Praedicare Evangelium Pro Pauperibus Misit Me (He has sent me to declare the good news to the poor)

Styles of Thomas J. Netto
- Reference style: His Grace; The Most Reverend
- Spoken style: Your Grace
- Religious style: Archbishop
- Posthumous style: None

Msgr. Dr. Thomas Jessayyan Netto (born 29 December 1964) is the Metropolitan Archbishop of the Roman Catholic Archdiocese of Trivandrum. Archbishop Netto is the second Metropolitan Archbishop of Thiruvananthapuram archdiocese.

== Biography ==
Thomas Jessayyan Netto was born in Puthiyathura in the Archdiocese of Trivandrum on 29 December 1964, and was ordained as a priest there on 19 December 1989. He completed his studies in philosophy and theology at Saint Joseph's Pontifical Seminary in Alwaye and earned a sociology diploma from Loyola College in Trivandrum. He received his doctorate in dogmatic theology (also known as ecclesiology) from the Pontifical Urban University in Rome. He has worked for the archdiocese in a number of positions, including assistant priest, executive secretary of ecumenism and dialogue, parish priest at Pettah, Thope, and St. Augustine Church, Murukumpuzha. Other responsibilities included serving as the executive secretary of Basic Christian Communities, the rector of St. Vincent's Minor Seminary and editor of the diocesan journal Jeevanum Velichavum.
He was appointed as the Metropolitan Archbishop of Trivandrum by Pope Francis on 2 February 2022. He was consecrated as a bishop on 19 March 2022 and took over from Emeritus Archbishop Rev. Maria Callist Soosa Pakiam as Metropolitan Archbishop of Thiruvananthapuram.
