= Thiruvananthapuram–Kasaragod Coastal Highway =

Proposed coastal highway in Kerala, India

- Proposed Coastal Highway alignment (approximate) highlighted in red

Route information
- Length: 625 km (388 mi)

Major junctions
- South end: Pozhiyoor, Thiruvananthapuram
- North end: Kunjathur, Kasaragod

Location
- Country: India
- State: Kerala
- Districts: Thiruvananthapuram, Kollam, Alappuzha, Ernakulam, Thrissur, Malappuram, Kozhikode, Kannur, Kasaragod

Highway system
- Roads in India; Expressways; National; State; Asian; State Highways in Kerala

Thiruvananthapuram–Kasaragod Coastal Highway is a 625 km planned coastal highway running parallel to Arabian Sea in Kerala, India. It is proposed and being constructed with a width of 14 m and begin from Pozhiyoor in Thiruvananthapuram district and ends at Kunjathur in Kasaragod district. The total estimated cost of the project is ₹6,500 crore, which is being borne by Kerala Government.

== Route description ==
The coastal highway passes through nine districts in Kerala at a distance of 625 km. Starting from Pozhiyoor in Thiruvananthapuram district, it passes through Kollam, Alappuzha, Ernakulam, Thrissur, Malappuram, Kozhikode and Kannur districts finally reaching Kunjathur in Kasaragod district. The highway runs parallel to the current National Highway 66 and will have bicycle track and footpath. When the project completes, it will also be the completion of India's longest cycle path. The 652.4 km long cycle path in Thalappadi, Kasaragod to Puvvar in Thiruvananthapuram wil pass through 8 districts. A 2.5 km underwater tunnel connecting Fort Kochi and Vypin in Ernakulam has been also proposed to be constructed as part of the project.

== History ==
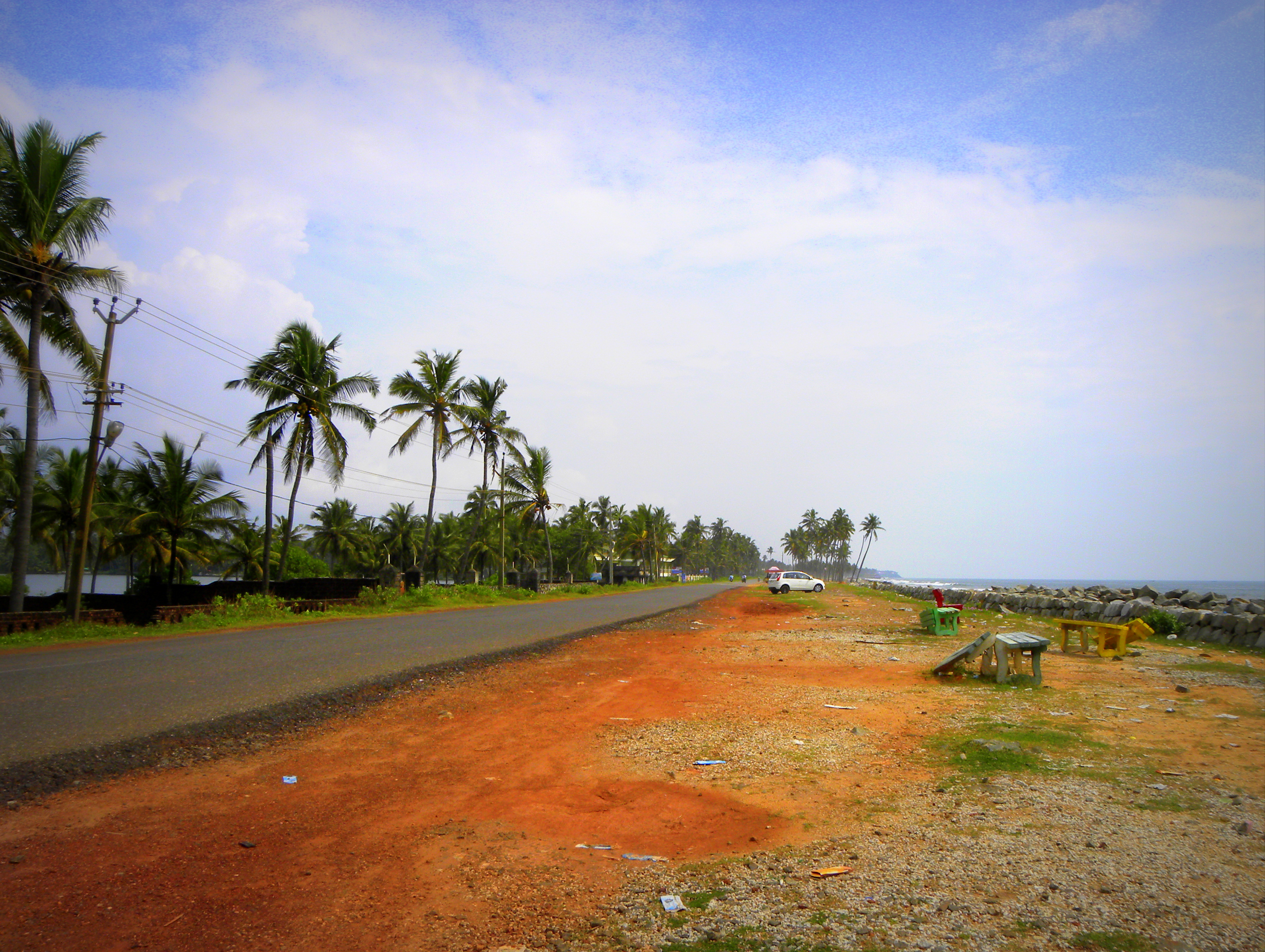
The road in Paravoor Thekkumbhagam that will become part of the coastal highway

The project was started by the Kerala government on the basis of a study conducted in 1993 by the National Transportation Planning and Research Center, Thiruvananthapuram. Later, the center recommended measures to reduce traffic congestion on the national highway and increase tourism opportunities. Finally, in 2017, the government approved the alignment prepared by National Transportation Planning and Research Centre (NATPAC). The Coastal Highway project is being implemented in three phases by making the existing national highways and state highways a part of the project and by constructing new ones. The Kerala Road Fund Board (KRFB) will be constructing the 468 kilometres of highway. The work on 120 km of the remaining 155 km will be covered under the Bharatmala project, which is initiated by the National Highway Authority of India (NHAI) to connect important coastal areas and ports in the country. Work on the remaining 35 kilometres will be done as part of other projects.

== See also ==
- Hill Highway (Kerala)
