= Munambam–Azhikode Bridge =

- Official name: Munambam–Azhikode Bridge

Characteristics
- Total length: 900 m
- Width: 15 m
- Height: 12.5 m

History
- Construction start: 2023
- Construction end: under construction

The Munambam–Azhikode Bridge is a bridge under construction, which connects Kodungallur Azhikode in Kaypamangalam constituency of Thrissur district and Munambam in the Vypin constituency of Ernakulam district in Kerala, India. The bridge, which will be a part of the coastal highway is expected to provide an easy access from Azhikode to the northern regions of Kerala. the construction work started in June 2023 after continuous protests.

== History ==
There has been a demand for a bridge to connect the coastal areas of Thrissur and Ernakulam since the early 1990s. Azhikode-Munambam Bridge Committee and other various organizations protest for more than two decades demanding the construction of the bridge. The demand became stronger after the ferry boat accident in 2007 followed by jhangar (ferry) strike due to various reasons.

In 2008 and thereafter, three foundation stone-laying ceremonies were held announcing that the bridge would be constructed. Finally, as a result of constant pressure and petitions, 160 crore rupees were allocated in the 2017 state budget. ₹ 6.49 crores was sanctioned for acquisition of land for the roads connected with the bridge and 8.13 crores was sanctioned for the Munambam side. A hearing for the Social Impact Assessment Report was held in August 2019 under the chairmanship of E.T Tyson MLA. Based on the completion of the environmental impact study conducted by Kalamassery Rajagiri College, the hearing was attended by all those who would lose their land and house. Administrative approval was given for the construction of the bridge, which is very beneficial for coastal development and tourism sector, under the KIFBI 2017-18 project.

In December 2019, as part of the land acquisition for the approach road with the construction of the bridge, the seven-member committee evaluating the social impact report visited the project area and held discussions with the landowners. On the basis of this report, land acquisition of 18 meters width was completed for the construction of the bridge, associated road and service road on both sides.

== Description ==
=== Specifications ===
The height of the bridge will be 12.5 meters and is being constructed across the Azhikode Munambam embankment. It will have a length of nearly 900 meters and a width of 15.10 meters. The construction is such that ships can sail comfortably. It will be one of the largest bridges on the proposed Coastal Highway and will have a 1.50 m wide footpath on both sides along with a 1.80 m wide cycle track adjacent to the footpath.

== See also ==
- Thiruvananthapuram–Kasaragod Coastal Highway
