= Santa Cruz Cathedral Basilica, Kochi =

Santa Cruz Cathedral Basilica
- Basílica Catedral da Santa Cruz Sé de Cochim സാന്താ ക്രൂസ് കത്തീഡ്രൽ ബസിലിക്ക
- Santa Cruz Basilica

- Location within Kerala
- 9.965°N 76.243°E
- Location: (India) , Fort Kochi, Kochi, Kerala
- Country: India
- Denomination: Catholic Church
- Sui iuris church: Latin Church
- Website: www.dioceseofcochin.org

History
- Status: Basilica
- Founded: 3 May 1505
- Founder: Francisco de Almeida

Architecture
- Style: Gothic

Administration
- Province: Verapoly
- Archdiocese: Archdiocese of Verapoly
- Diocese: Diocese of Cochin

Clergy
- Archbishop: Joseph Kalathiparambil
- Bishop: Antony Kattiparambil
- Rector: Very Rev Fr Shaiju Pariyathusherry
- Vicar: Very Rev Fr Shaiju Pariyathusherry
- Priest: Rev Fr John Jackson Marakamparambil

The Santa Cruz Cathedral Basilica, also known as Kotta Palli or Kottepalli, is located in Fort Kochi, Kochi. It is one of the thirty-four basilicas in India and one of nine in Kerala. This heritage edifice of Kerala is renowned for its Indo-European and Gothic architectural style. It serves as the cathedral church of the Diocese of Cochin.

Originally built by the Portuguese in 1505 after securing the permission of the King of Cochin, it was elevated to a cathedral by Pope Paul IV in 1558. Although many Catholic buildings were destroyed by Dutch conquerors who arrived in Cochin in the 17th century, this cathedral was spared. However, the British who later arrived demolished it in 1795, and a new structure was commissioned in 1887 by the then bishop of Cochin, João Gomes Ferreira. The new building was consecrated in 1905 and proclaimed a basilica by Pope John Paul II in 1984.

The Santa Cruz Cathedral Basilica attracts tourists year-round. It is not only a place of devotion but also a center of historic significance, endowed with architectural and artistic richness.

== History ==
=== Portuguese missionaries and Santa Cruz Church : 1505 - 1558 ===
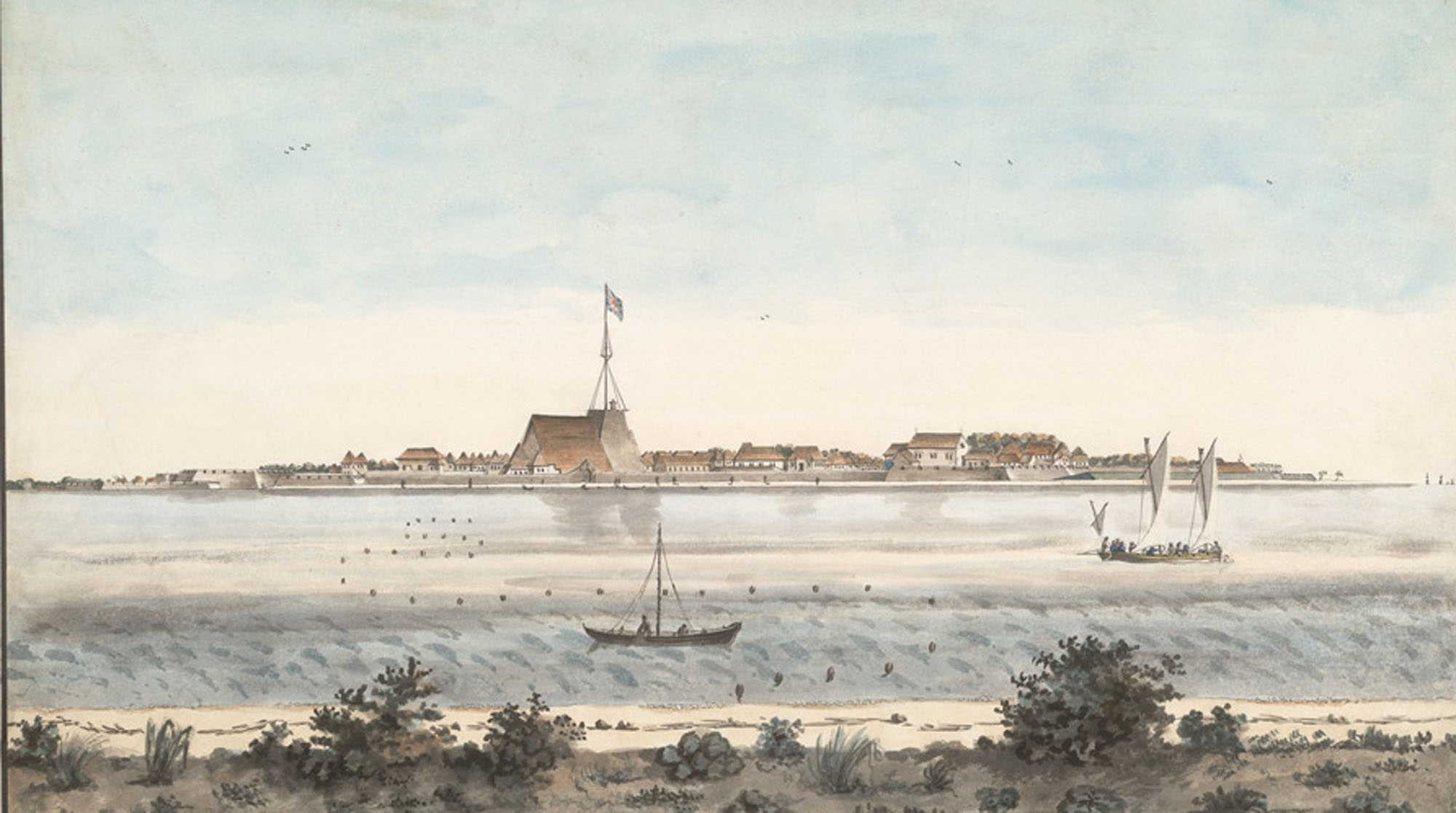
Santa Cruz Church in 1505

The Santa Cruz Cathedral Basilica's origin is closely linked to significant historical events following the arrival of the second Portuguese fleet led by Captain Pedro Álvares Cabral on 26 November 1500. The Portuguese fleet, comprising 13 ships and 18 priests, quickly won the goodwill of Unni Goda Varma Tirumulpadu, the then King of the Kingdom of Cochin (Cohim, Kochi), who permitted four priests to conduct apostolic work among the early Christian communities in and around Cochin. The Portuguese missionaries established the Portuguese Mission in 1500. This cordial reception by the King of Cochin incited the Zamorin of Calicut (Calecute, Kozhikode) to declare war on the Kingdom of Cochin. In 1505, Portuguese forces under Dom Afonso de Albuquerque successfully defended the Cochin monarch. Grateful for their support, the king granted them permission to build the Portuguese fort Immanuel (Fort Kochi) and establish trade relations with Quilon (Coulão, Kollam). This laid the foundation for the eastern Portuguese Empire.

Further developments in 1505 saw Dom Francisco de Almeida, the first viceroy of Portuguese India (Estado da Índia), secure permission from the king of Cochin for further Portuguese fortifications of Fort Manuel on Cochin and approval to build two churches — Santa Cruz Basilica (1505) and St. Francis Church (1506) — using stones and mortar. This construction was unprecedented, as local prejudices typically reserved such materials for royal palaces or temples. The foundation of this church, was laid on 4 May 1505, aligning with the feast of the invention of the Holy Cross. Upon completion, the church was named Santa Cruz, meaning Holy Cross. This site was initially positioned on the eastern side of what is now the Children's Park in Fort Kochi.

=== Raising to Cathedral and demolition : 1558 - 1795 ===
In 1558, Pope Paul IV elevated the Santa Cruz Church to the status of a Cathedral. This followed the establishment of the Archdiocese of Goa in 1557 as an independent archbishopric, with the newly formed Diocese of Cochin — one of the first dioceses in India — made its suffragan see, along with the Diocese of Malacca. This brought the whole of the Eastern dioceses under the jurisdiction of Goa, extending its boundaries from the Cape of Good Hope in South Africa to Burma, China, and Japan in East Asia.

When the Dutch conquered Cochin in 1663, they destroyed most of the Portuguese establishments, including Catholic buildings in the area. However, the St. Francis Church and the Santa Cruz Cathedral were spared. While the former remained a church, the latter was repurposed as an arms storehouse by the Dutch.

Later, when the British expelled the Dutch on 20 October 1795, they maintained the church for a similar purpose, using it as a warehouse. In 1806, they demolished the Santa Cruz Cathedral. This was part of a broader strategy of the British to dismantle Catholic infrastructure in the region. Despite the destruction, a part of the Cathedral survived as a monument. One of the decorative granite pillars from the demolished Cathedral has been preserved and is now situated at the southeastern corner of the present Basilica premises.

=== Erection of the present day Santa Cruz Cathedral Basilica : 1886 - present ===
Following its demolition by the British, about a century later, Bishop João Gomes Ferreira (1887–1897), who served as both a missionary and the Bishop of Cochin, took the lead in reconstructing the Cathedral and initiating its construction plan. However, it was his successor, Bishop Mateus de Oliveira Xavier (1897–1908), who oversaw its completion. On 19 November 1905, Bishop Sebastião José Pereira, the Bishop of Damao, consecrated the cathedral. Recognizing its age, artistic significance, and historical importance, Pope John Paul II, in a special Decree titled "Constat Sane Templum Sanctae Cruci" dated 23 August 1984, elevated the Santa Cruz Cathedral to the esteemed status of Basilica.

The Basilica stands distinguished by its predominantly white exterior contrasting with a pastel-colored interior, graced with two imposing spires, exhibits a blend of Gothic and Indo-European architectural influences. Adorning the columns are intricate frescoes and murals, with seven large canvas paintings portraying the passion and death on the Cross, including a captivating rendition of the Last Supper inspired by Leonardo da Vinci's masterpiece. Additionally, the Basilica's splendor is enhanced by its exquisite stained glass windows, and ceiling paintings portraying scenes from the Via Crucis of Jesus Christ. All of these artistic embellishments, including the main altar, were skillfully crafted by the acclaimed Italian Jesuit brother and painter Fr. Antonio Moscheni, alongside his disciple Fr. De Gama of Mangalore. Fr. Antonio Moscheni died on 15 November 1905, just four days before the cathedral's inauguration.

== Gallery ==
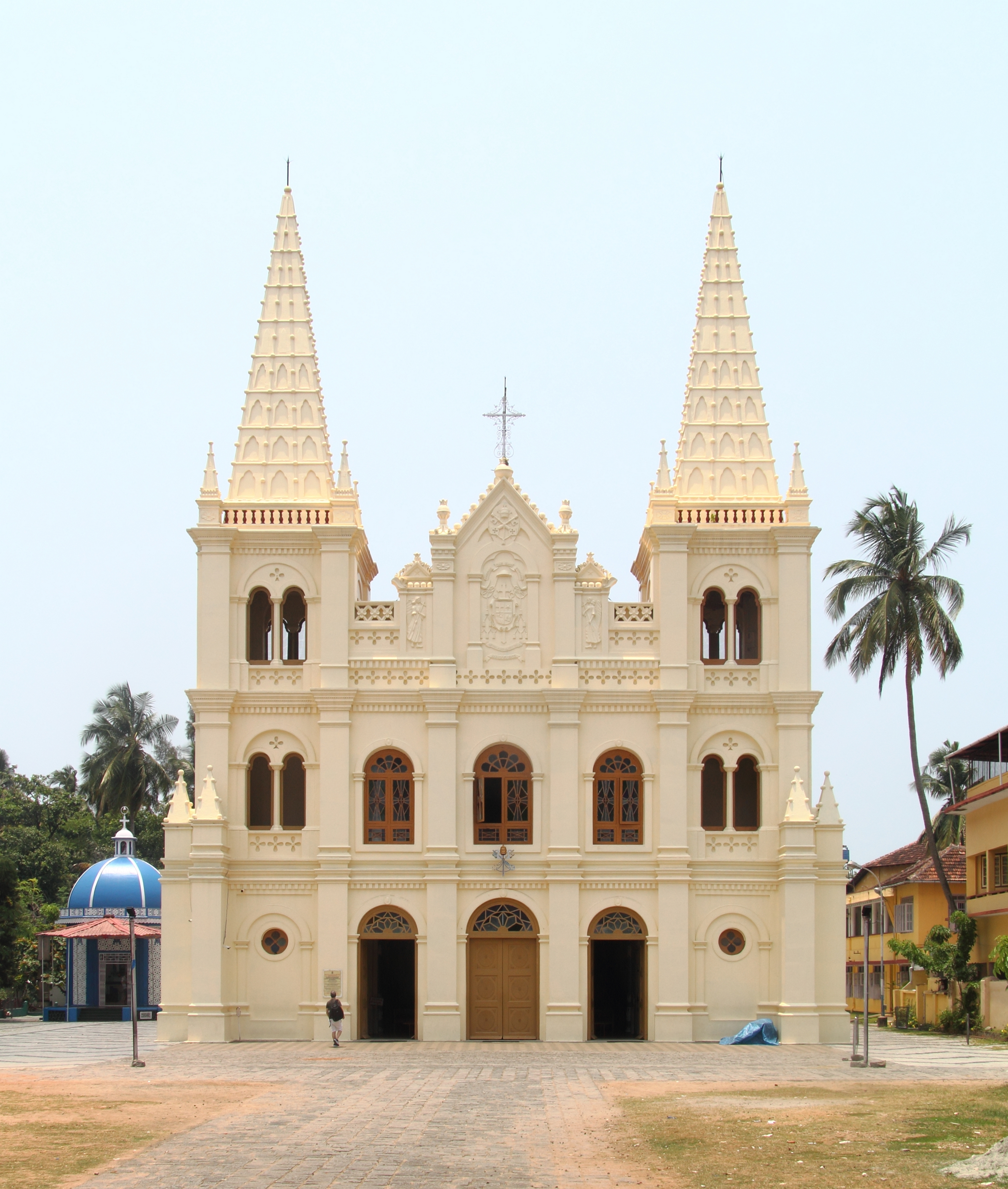
Facade Of The Cathedral

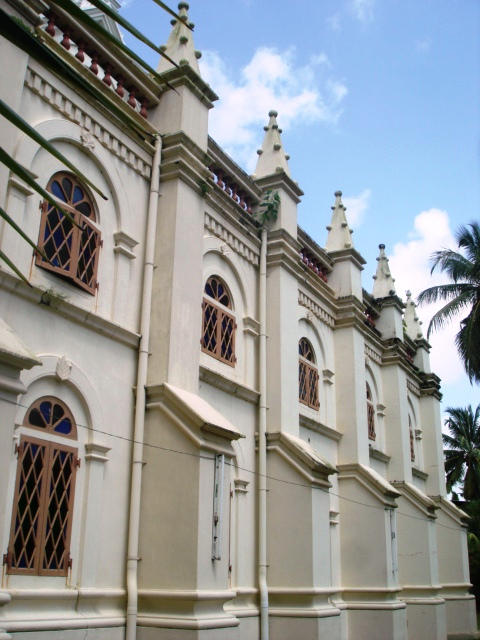
Back Side

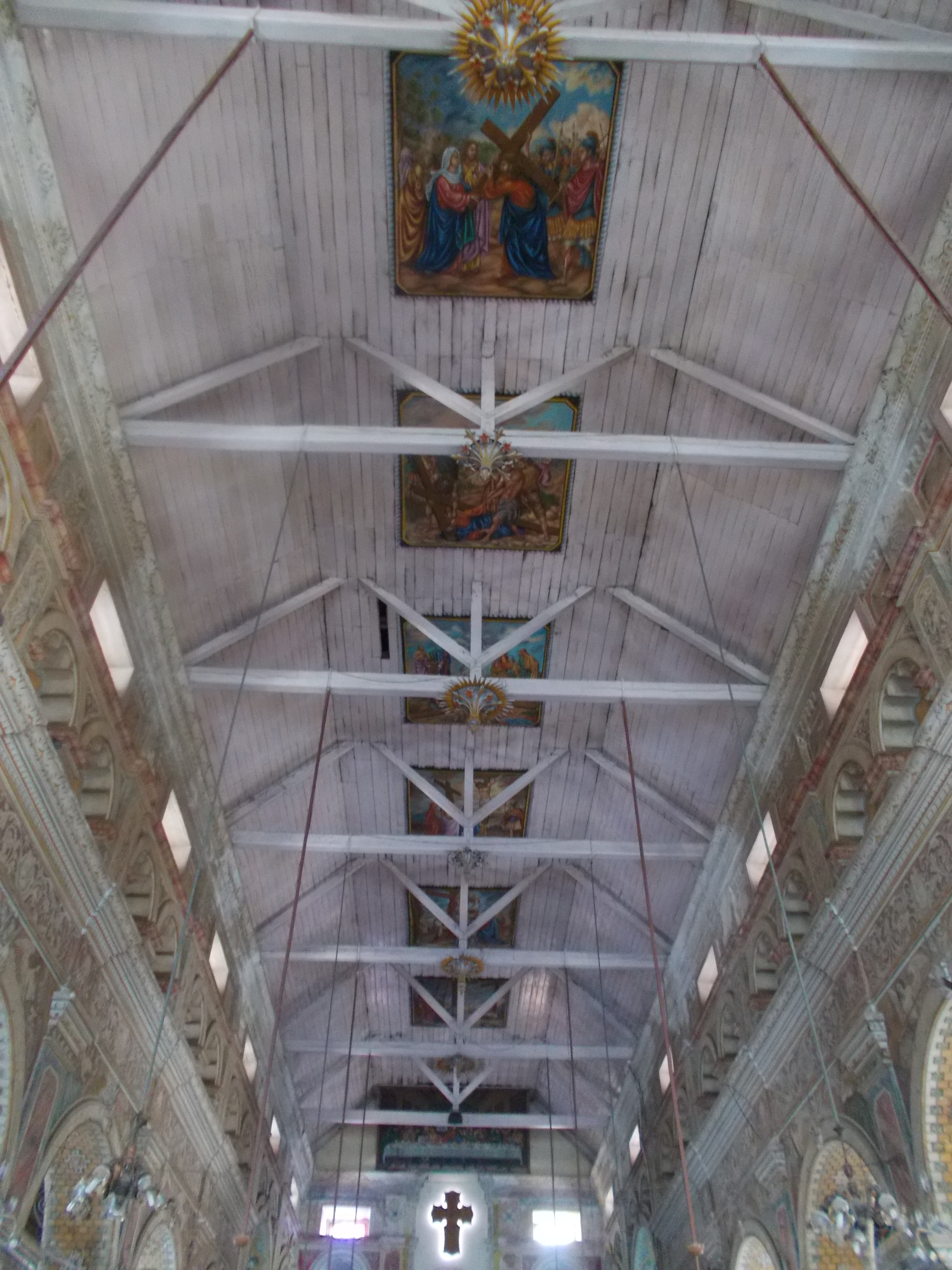
Ceiling Of the Church

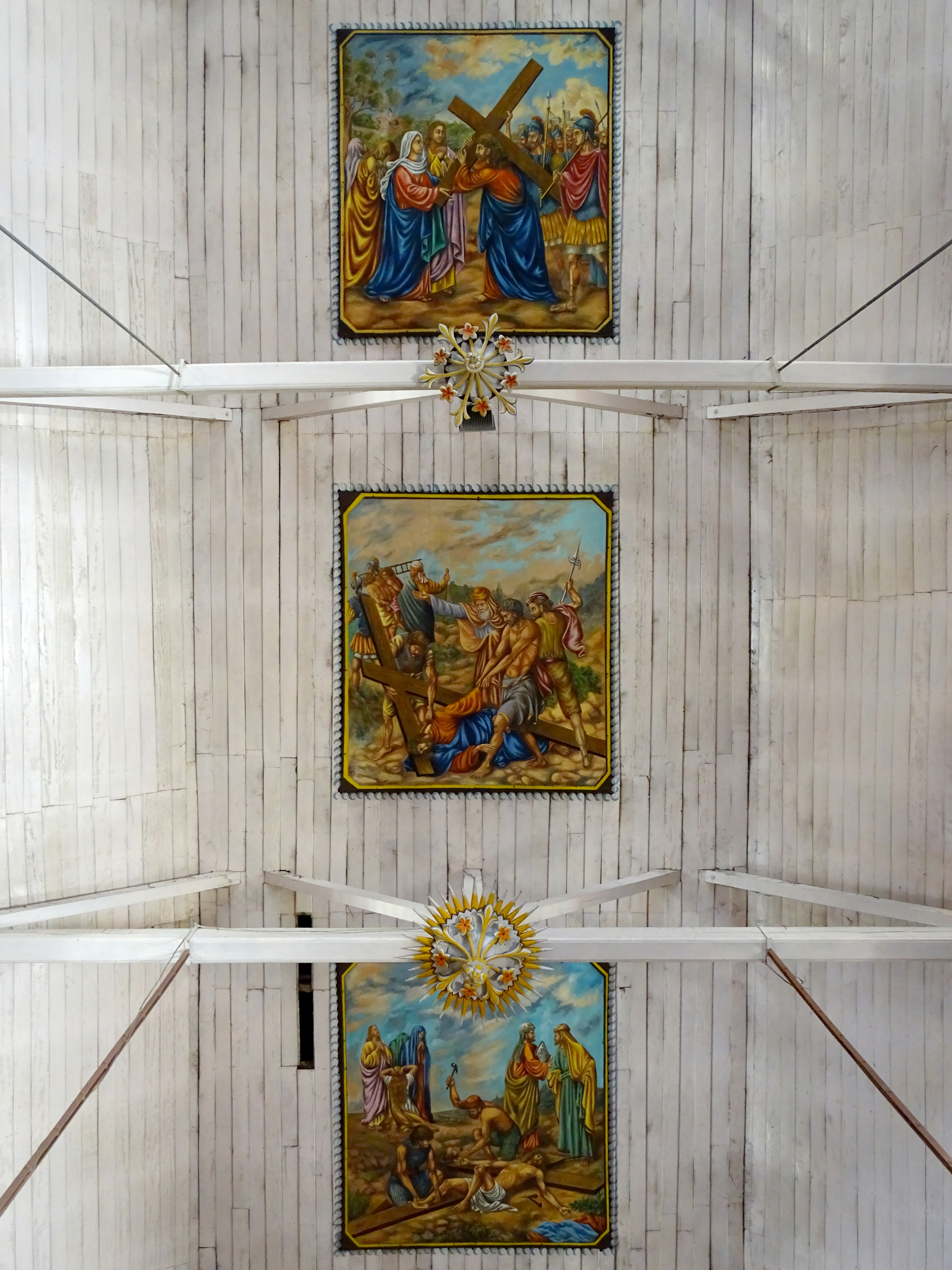
Celling Paintings

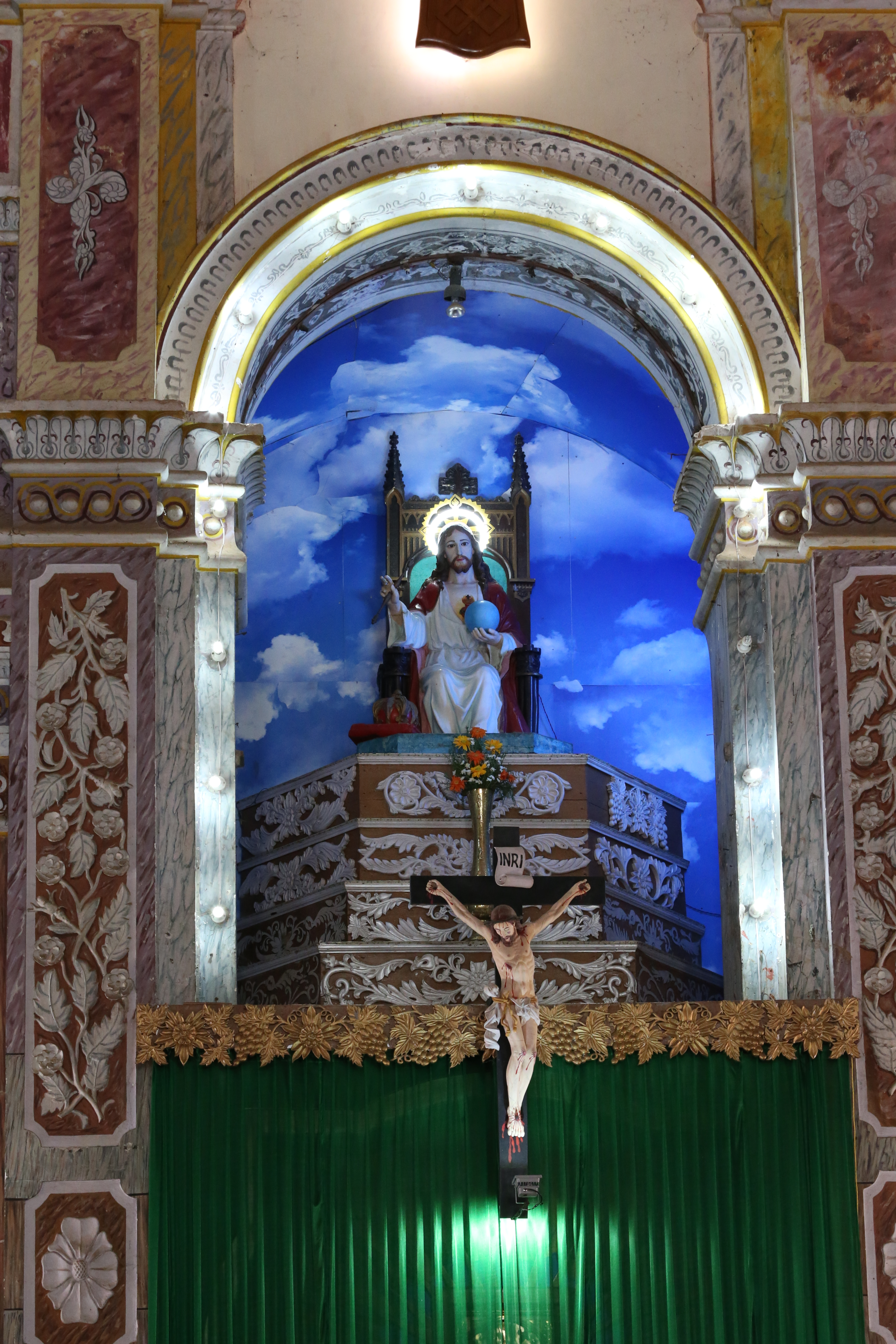
Altar Crucifix

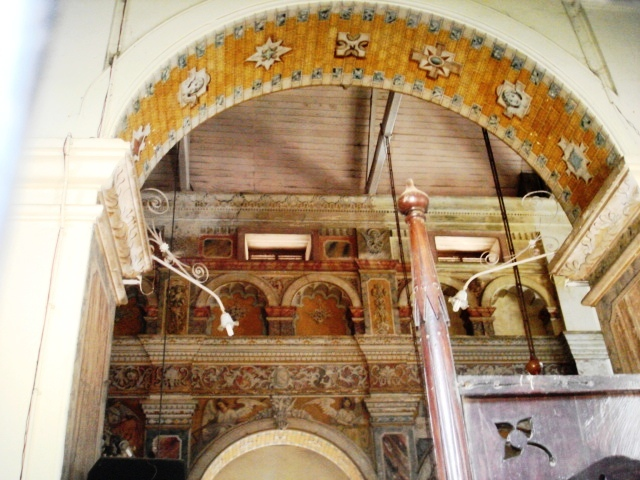
Interior Paintings

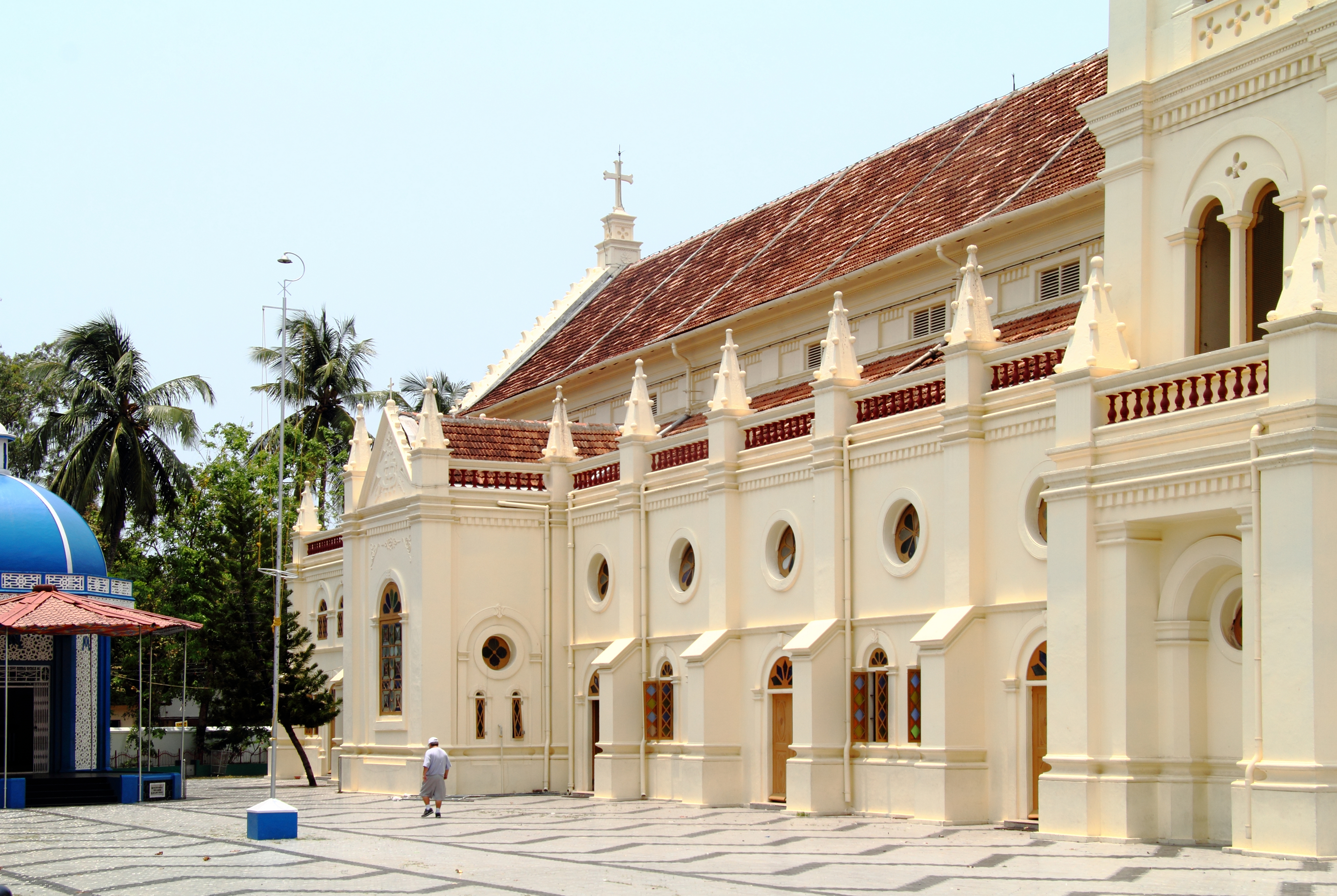
Side View of the cathedral

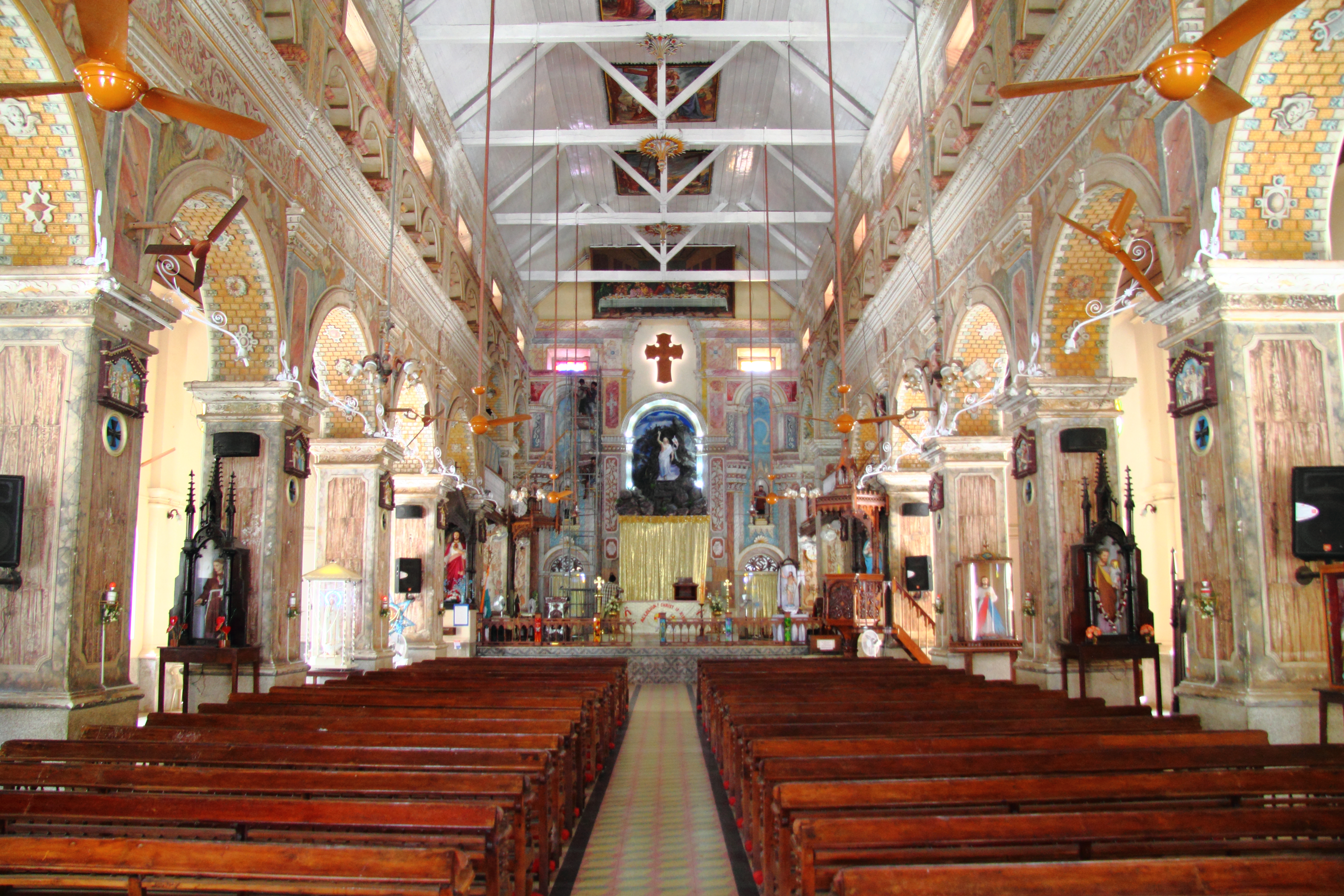
Interior View

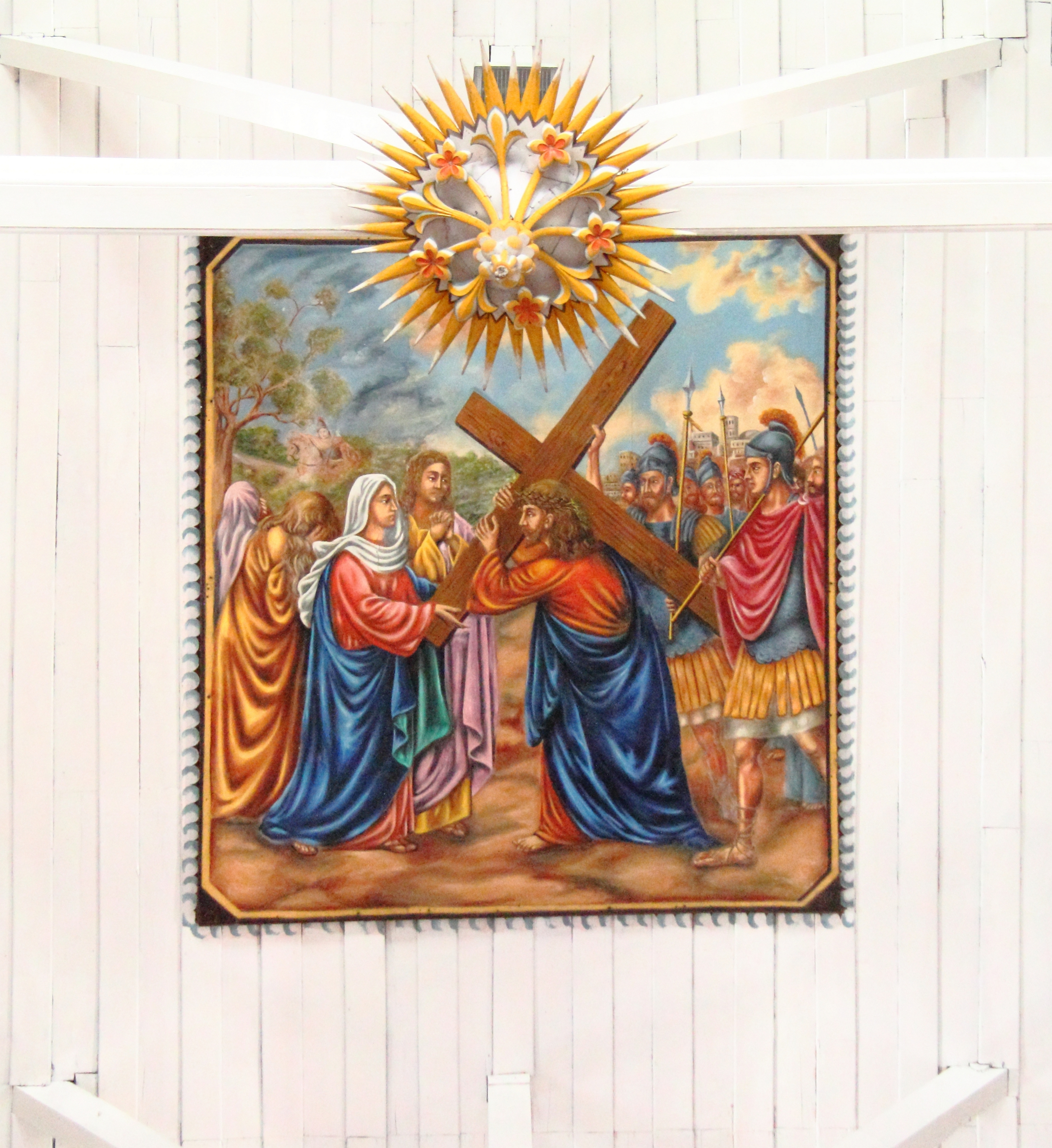
Painting on the ceiling

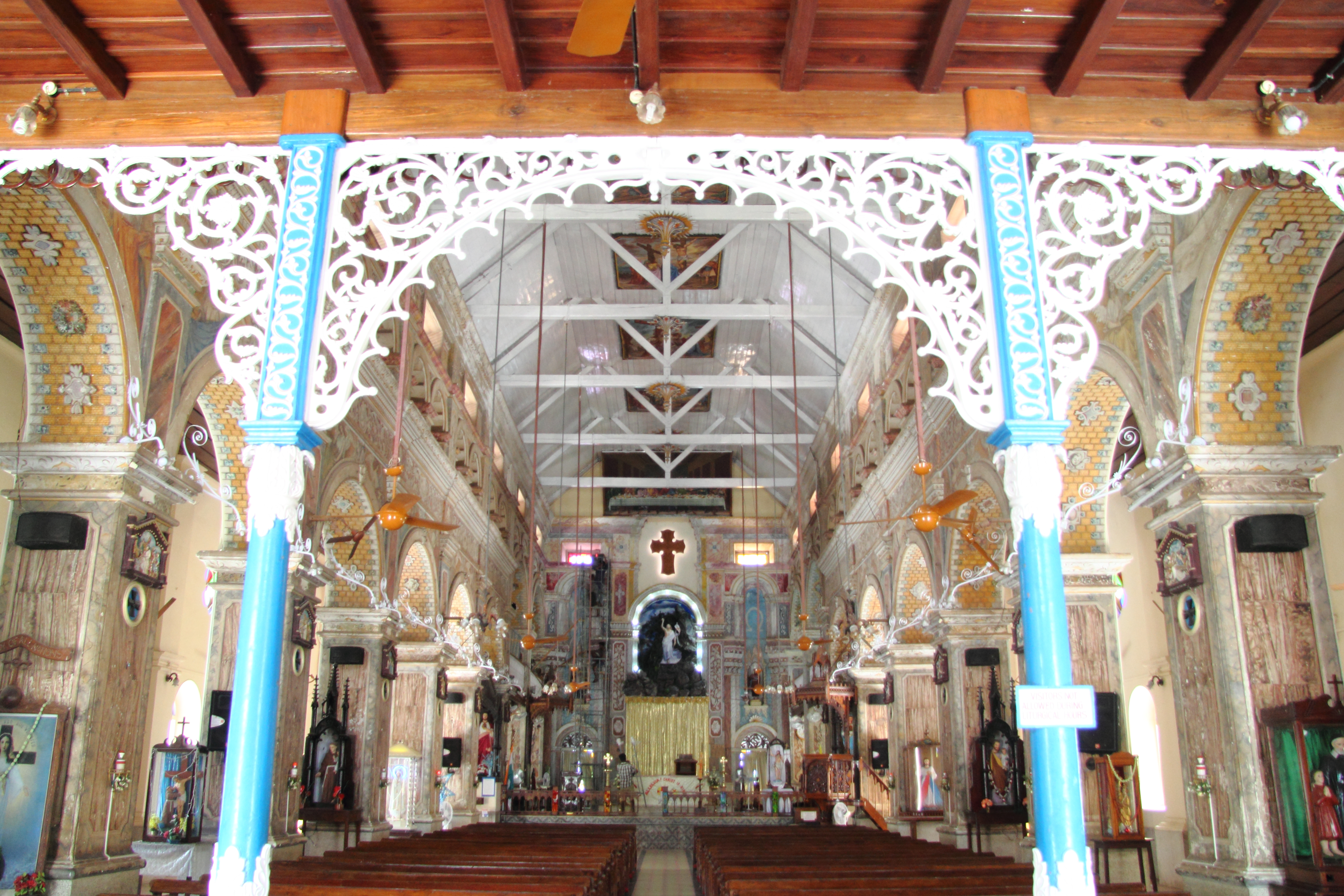
Distant view of the altar

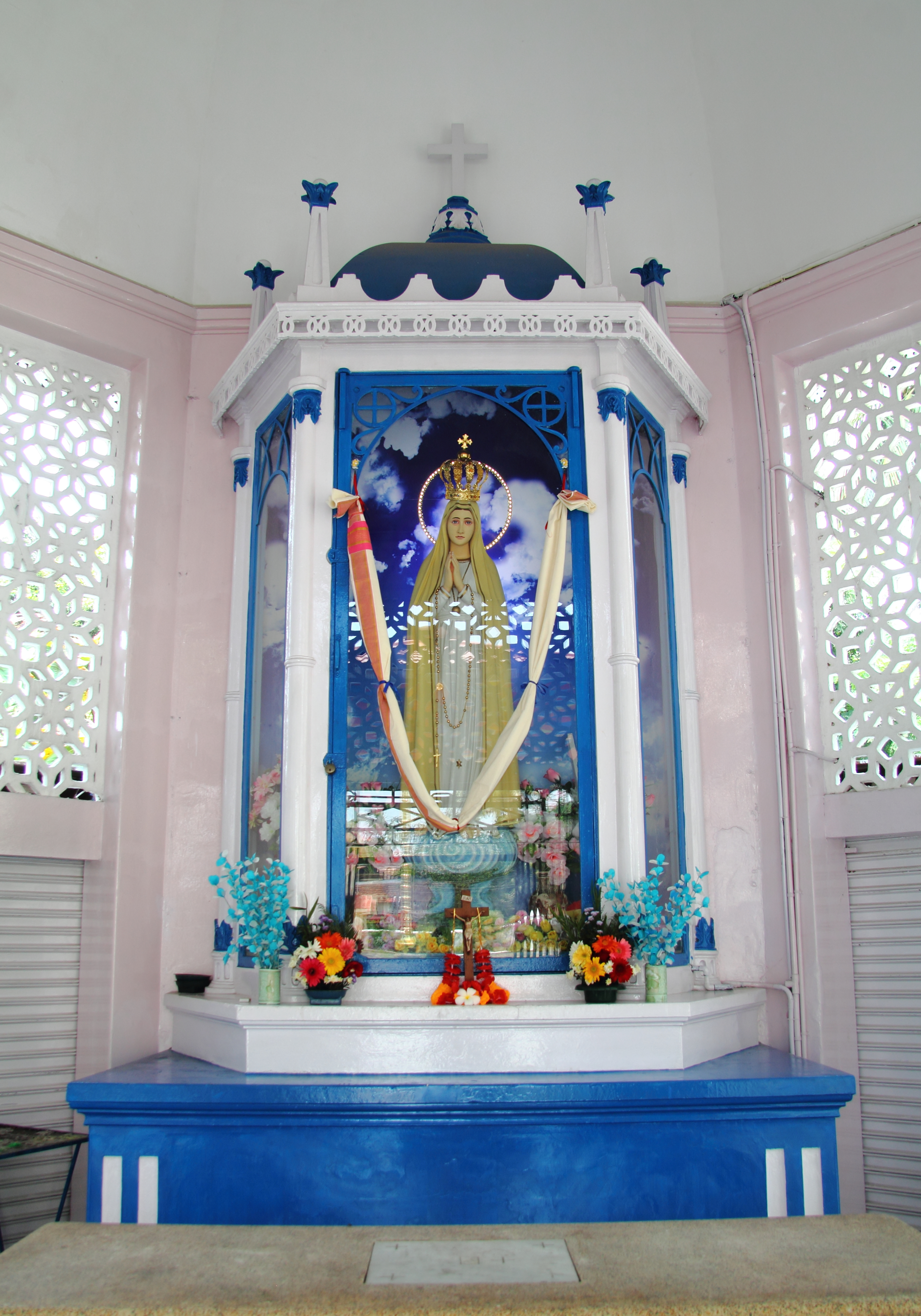
Shrine of our lady

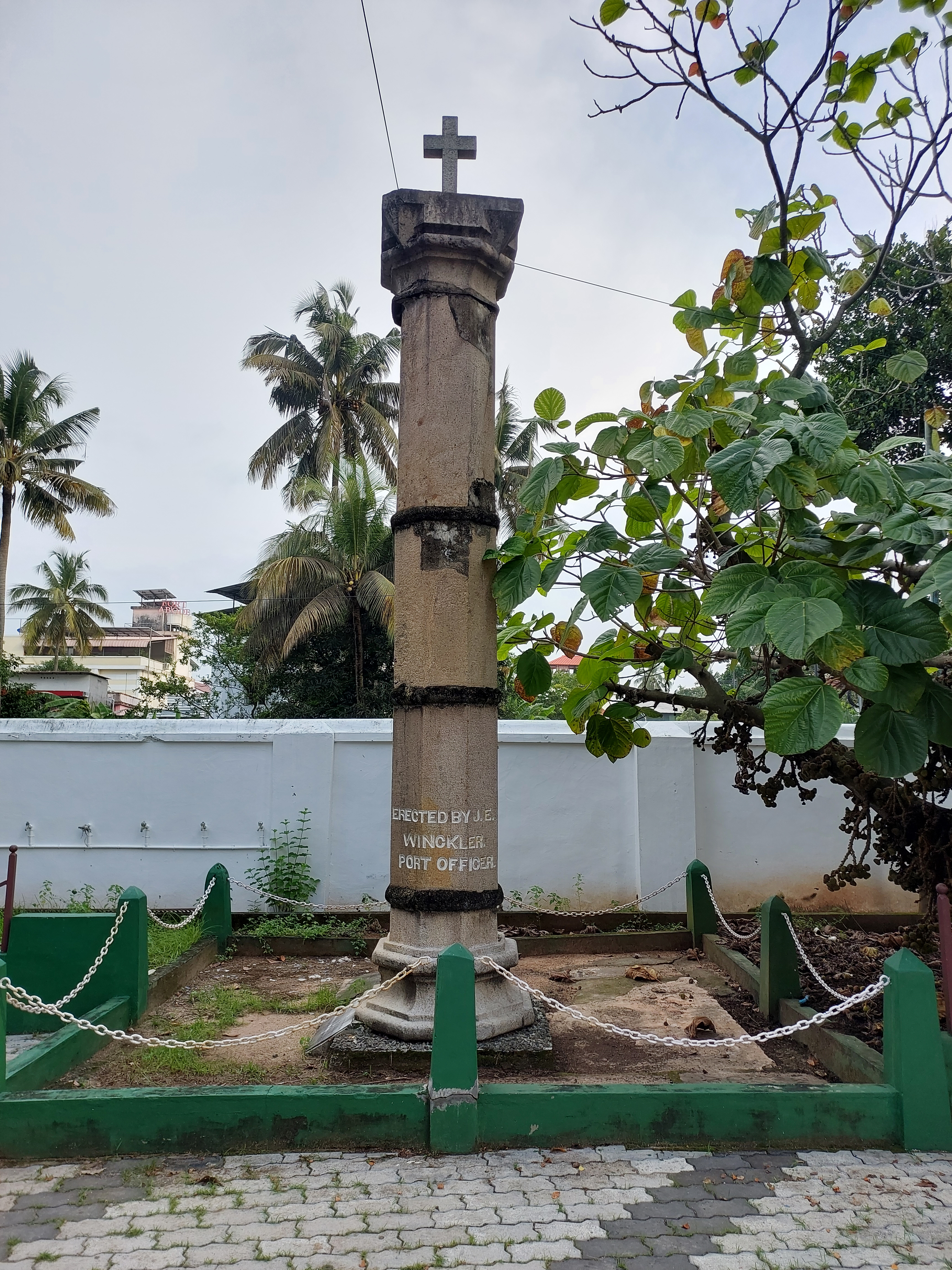
Protected monument - the pillar of Santa Cruz Cathedral of 1505

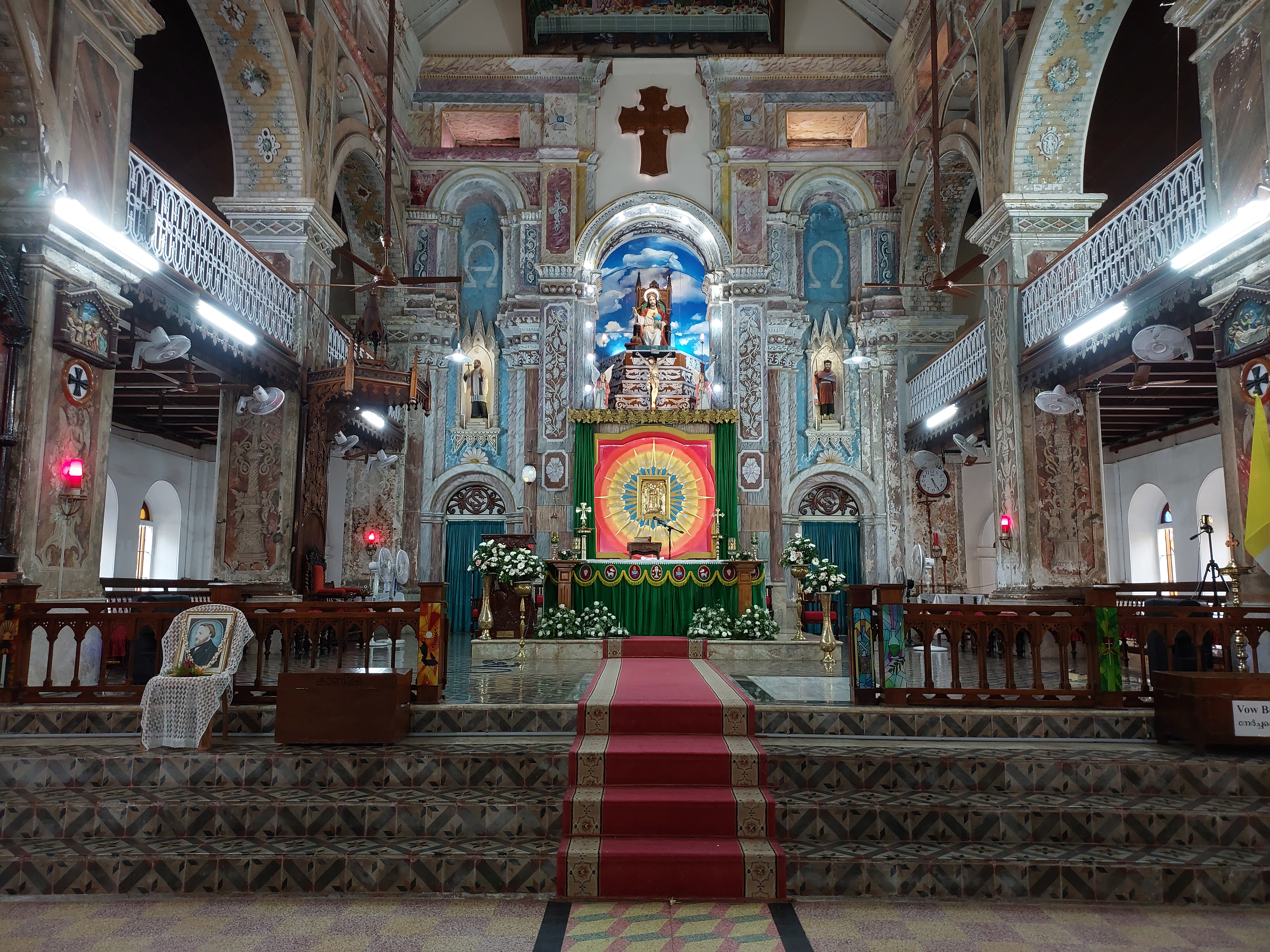
Main Altar

Back Side

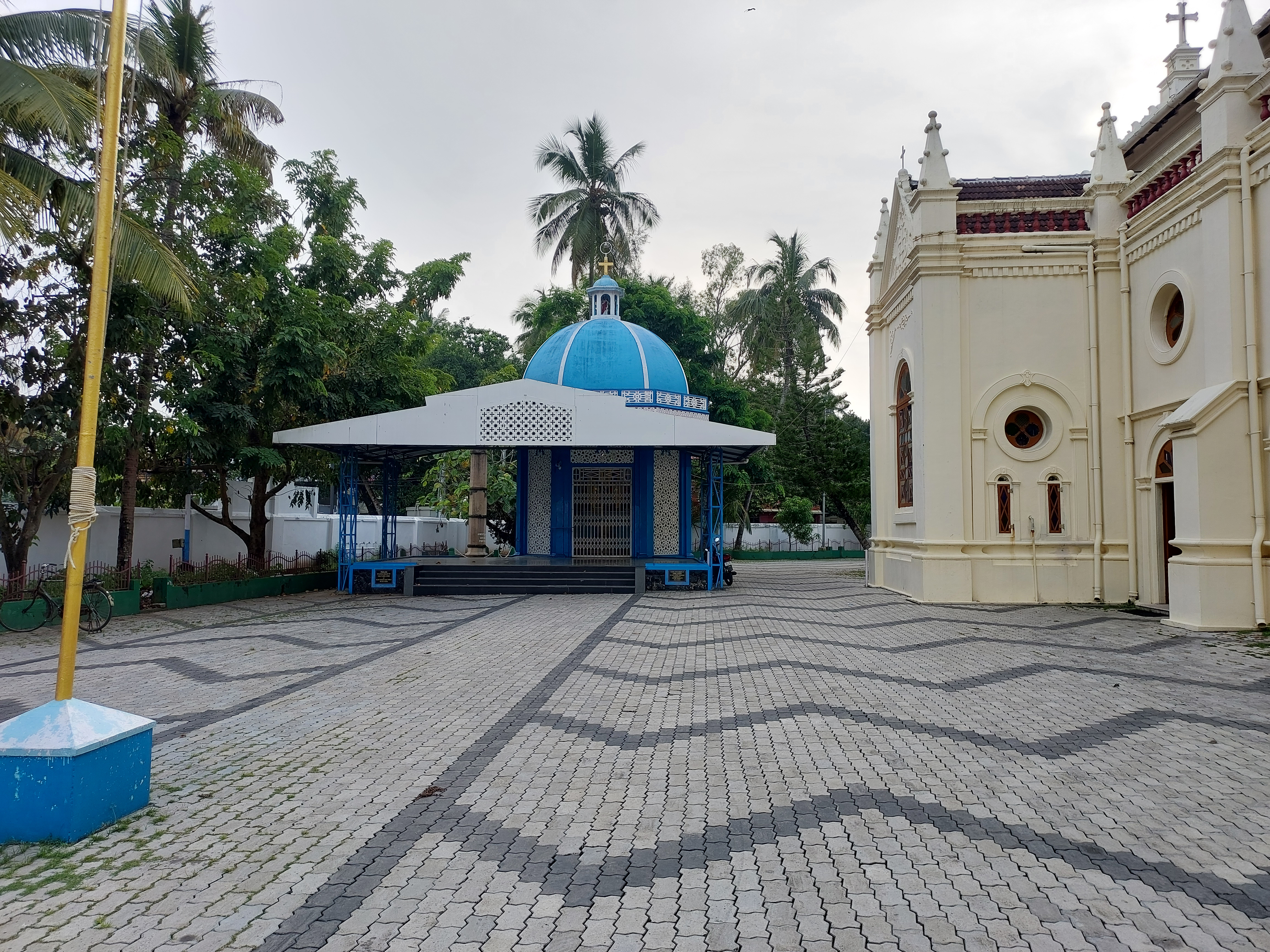
Shrine

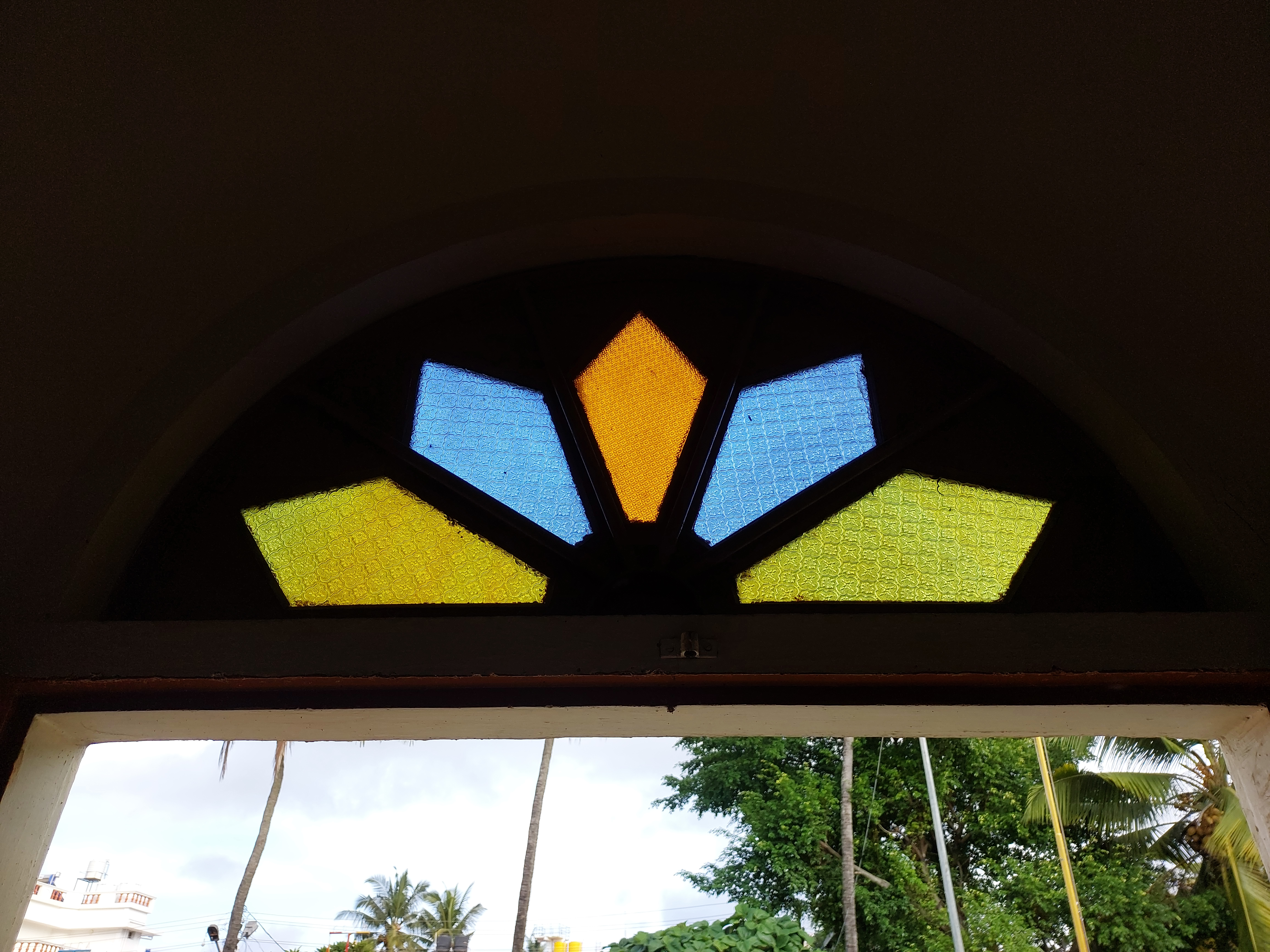
Stained Glass Windows

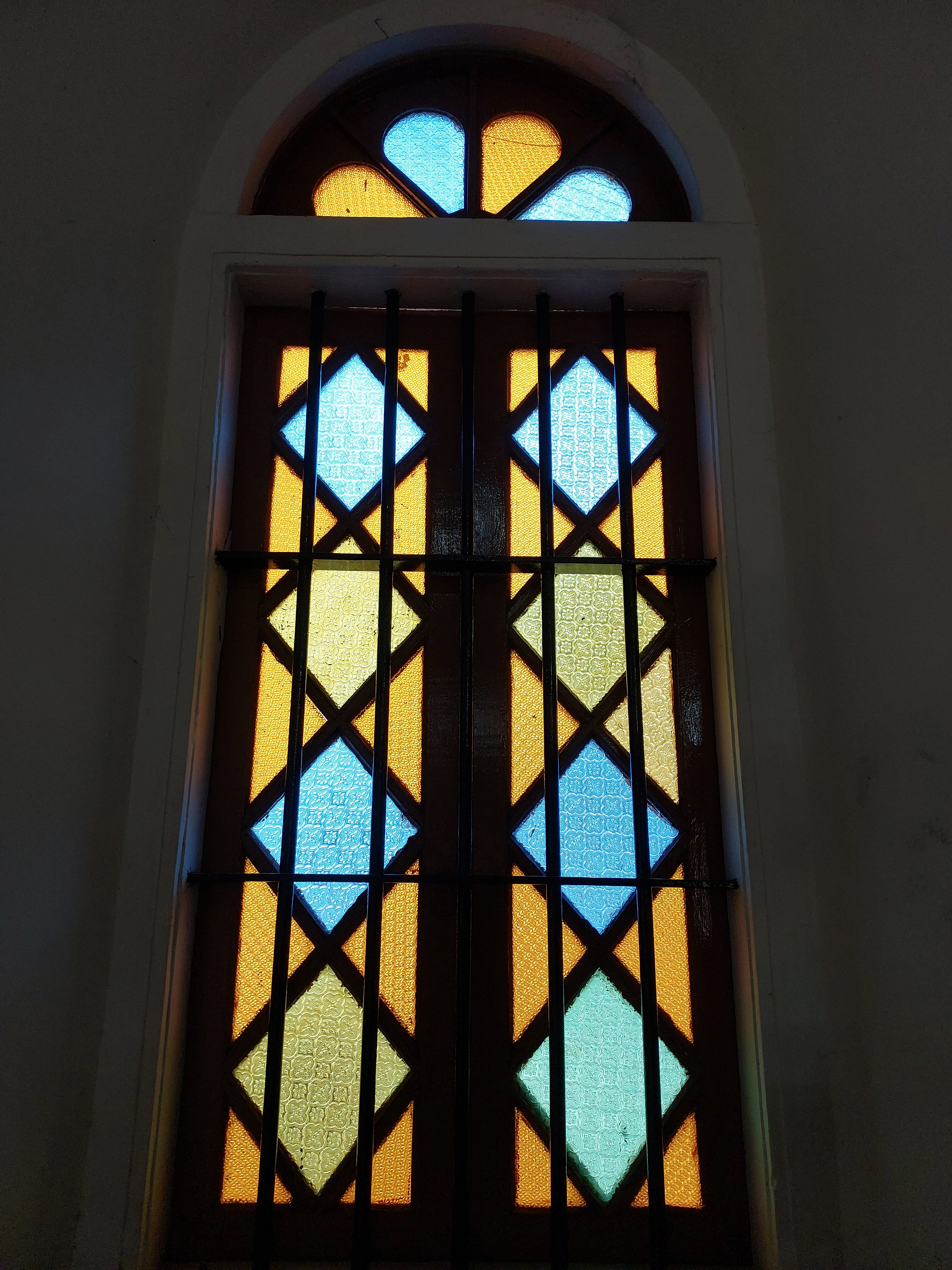
Window

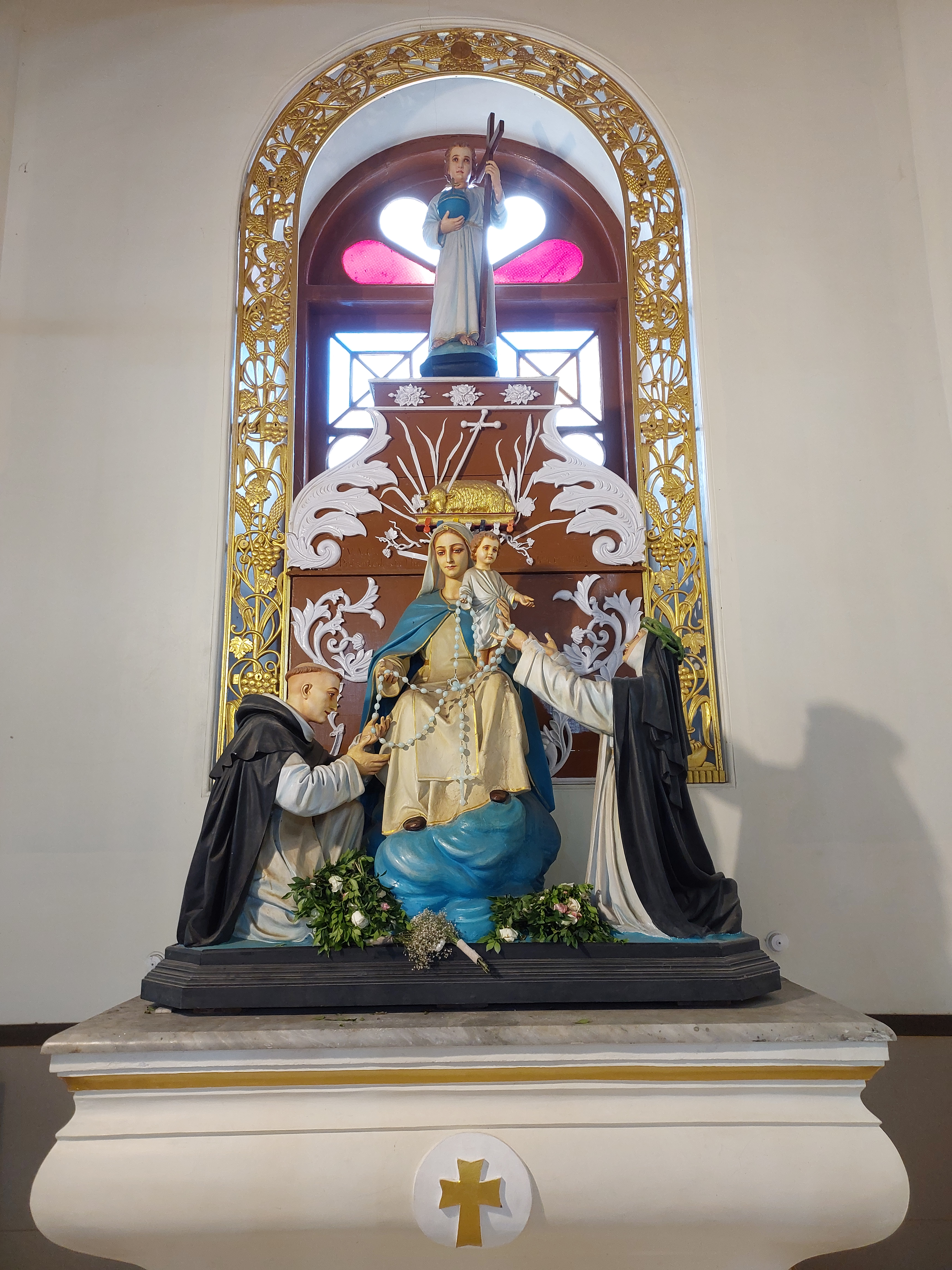
Side Altar

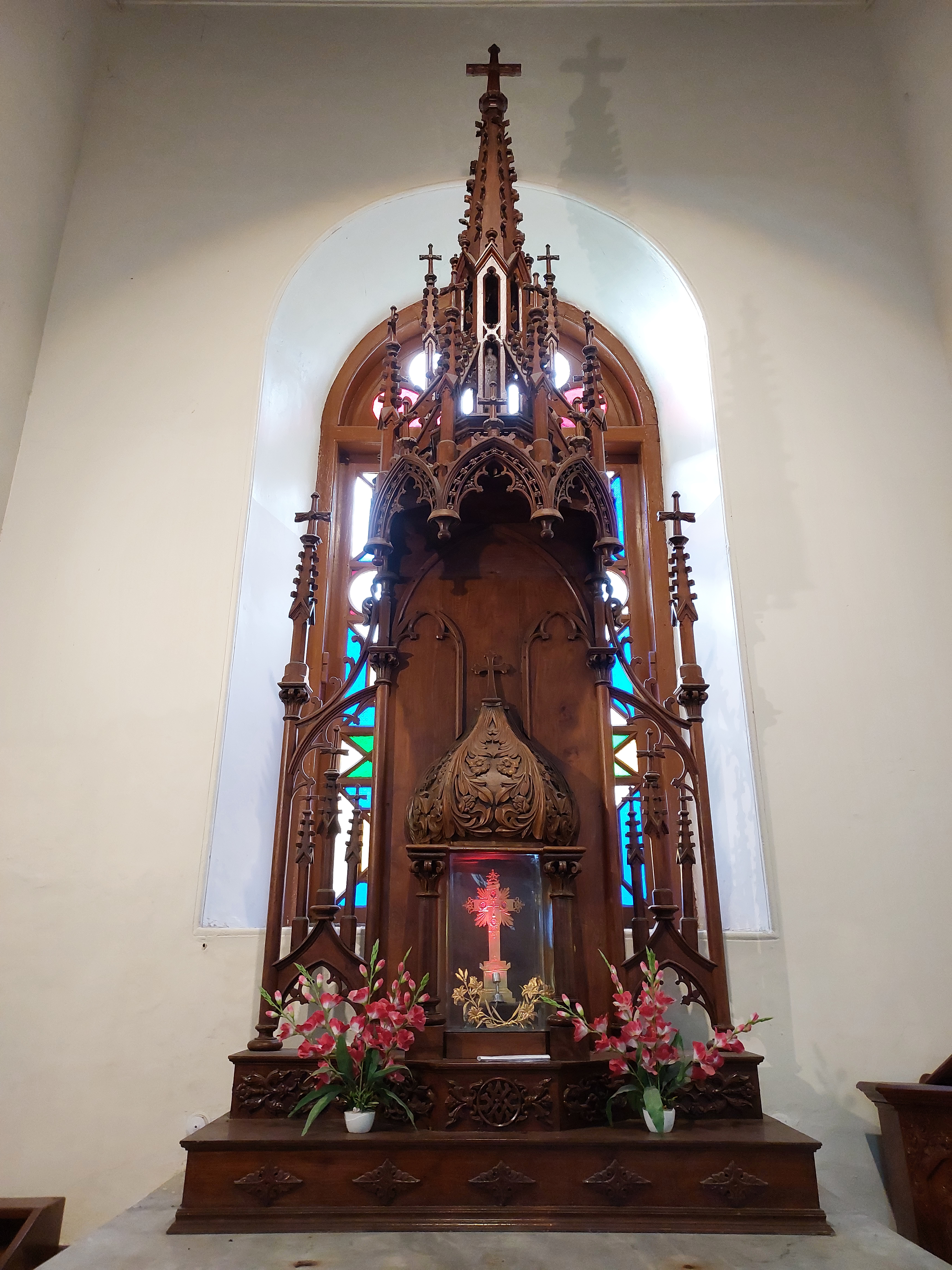
Relic Of Holy Cross

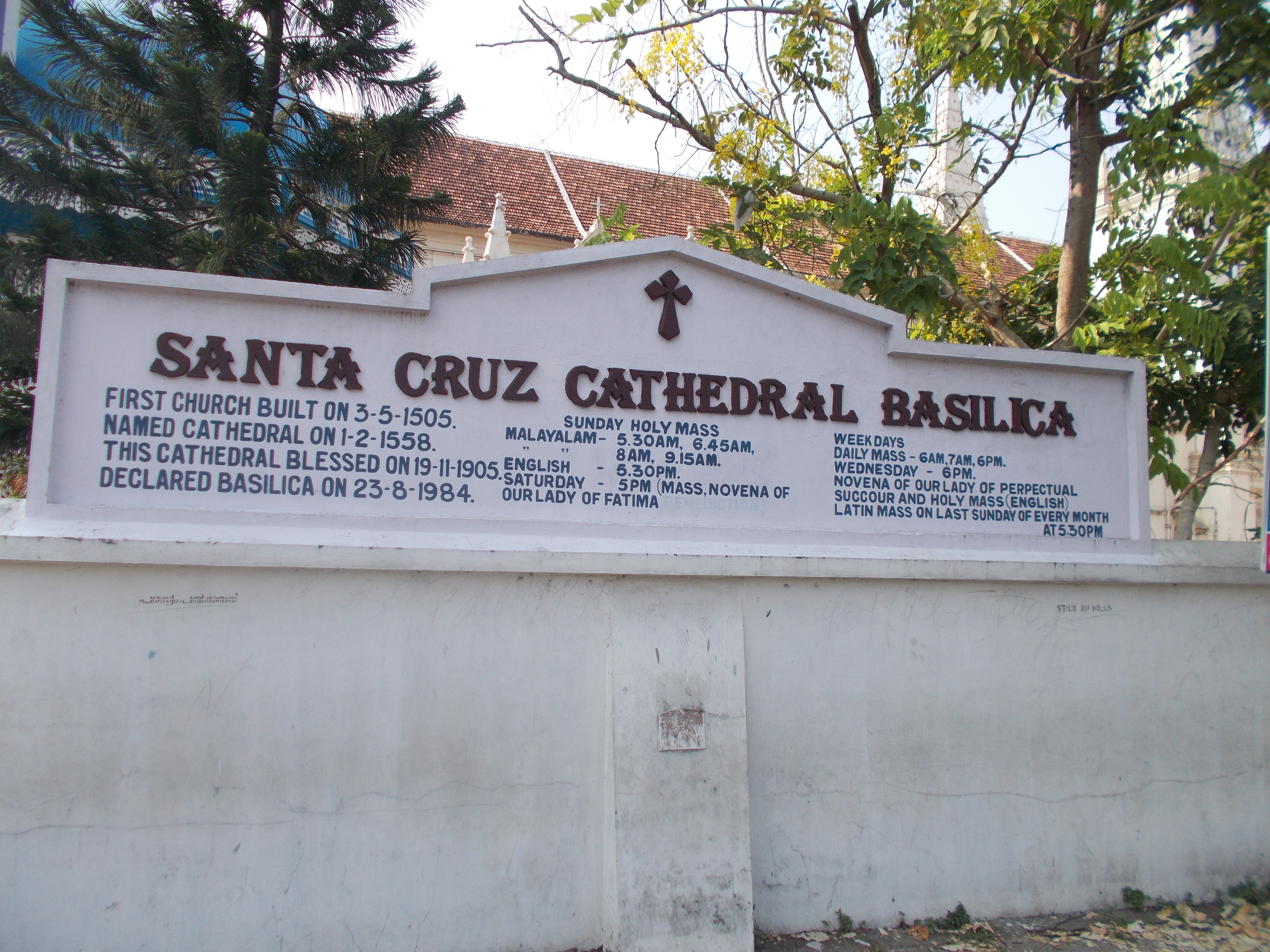
Inscription outside the church

== See also ==
- Catholic Church in India
- Christianity in India
- Diocese of Cochin
- List of basilicas in India
- List of Catholic dioceses
- List of Catholic dioceses in India
