= Great fire of Cochin =

Fire outbreak in Kerala, India

- Fort Cochin (Earth)
- Date: 4 January 1889
- Location: Fort Kochi, Kerala, India; 9.9658°N 76.2421°E
- Type: Fire
- Property damage: Around 300 houses and commercial properties destroyed

The Great fire of Cochin, also known as the Cochin Conflagration, occurred on 4 January 1889 at Fort Kochi (also known as "Fort Cochin" during British rule) in Kerala. The fire originated from a vessel named Chandrabhanu, which was docked in Cochin harbour and laden with highly flammable materials such as coconut oil, copra, coir, carpets, and spices. This catastrophic event has been compared to the Great Fire of London, due to its devastating impact on the city.

== Background and causes ==
During colonial time Kochi, then known as Cochin, was a significant port city under British control via the East India Company. After the British took over Fort Cochin in 1795, they aimed to suppress local shipbuilding to favour British interests. In this context, Chandrabhanu, a 315-tonne vessel constructed by local shipbuilders, symbolised local enterprise. The British authorities had imposed a court order to restrain the ship's owner from using it, leading to the vessel being anchored and heavily loaded.

On the fateful day, around 4 p.m., smoke was noticed emanating from the vessel. Efforts to mitigate the fire by cutting the ship's mooring ropes proved disastrous. Strong winds and currents drove the flaming ship towards the shore, causing the fire to spread rapidly among the nearby warehouses and buildings. These structures, predominantly made of wood with thatched roofs, were highly susceptible to fire.

== Devastation and impact ==
The fire ravaged a large portion of the city, particularly affecting the Calvathy area where many businesses were located. Notable companies such as Volkart Brothers, Pierce Leslie, Aspinwall & Co., and Brindon lost their warehouses and goods to the flames. Approximately 300 houses and numerous commercial properties were destroyed.

== Aftermath and legacy ==
In the aftermath, the city's infrastructure was in ruins. To commemorate the tragedy, a memorial pillar was erected by Port Captain Wrinkler, which still stands on the beach near Fort Kochi as a testament to the event. The devastation necessitated the rebuilding of many affected structures, including the historic Aspinwall House, which was reconstructed after the fire.

The Great fire of Cochin remains a significant historical event, highlighting the vulnerabilities of colonial urban centres and the dramatic consequences of such disasters. It was rumoured that the British set fire to the ship in a desperate bid to discourage the local owner of the ship from getting a favourable court order. Despite its scale, this event is less well-known compared to other historical fires, but its legacy continues to be an integral part of Cochin's rich history.
