= Azhikode, Thrissur =

Azhikode Azhicode Jetty Puthanpalli
- village
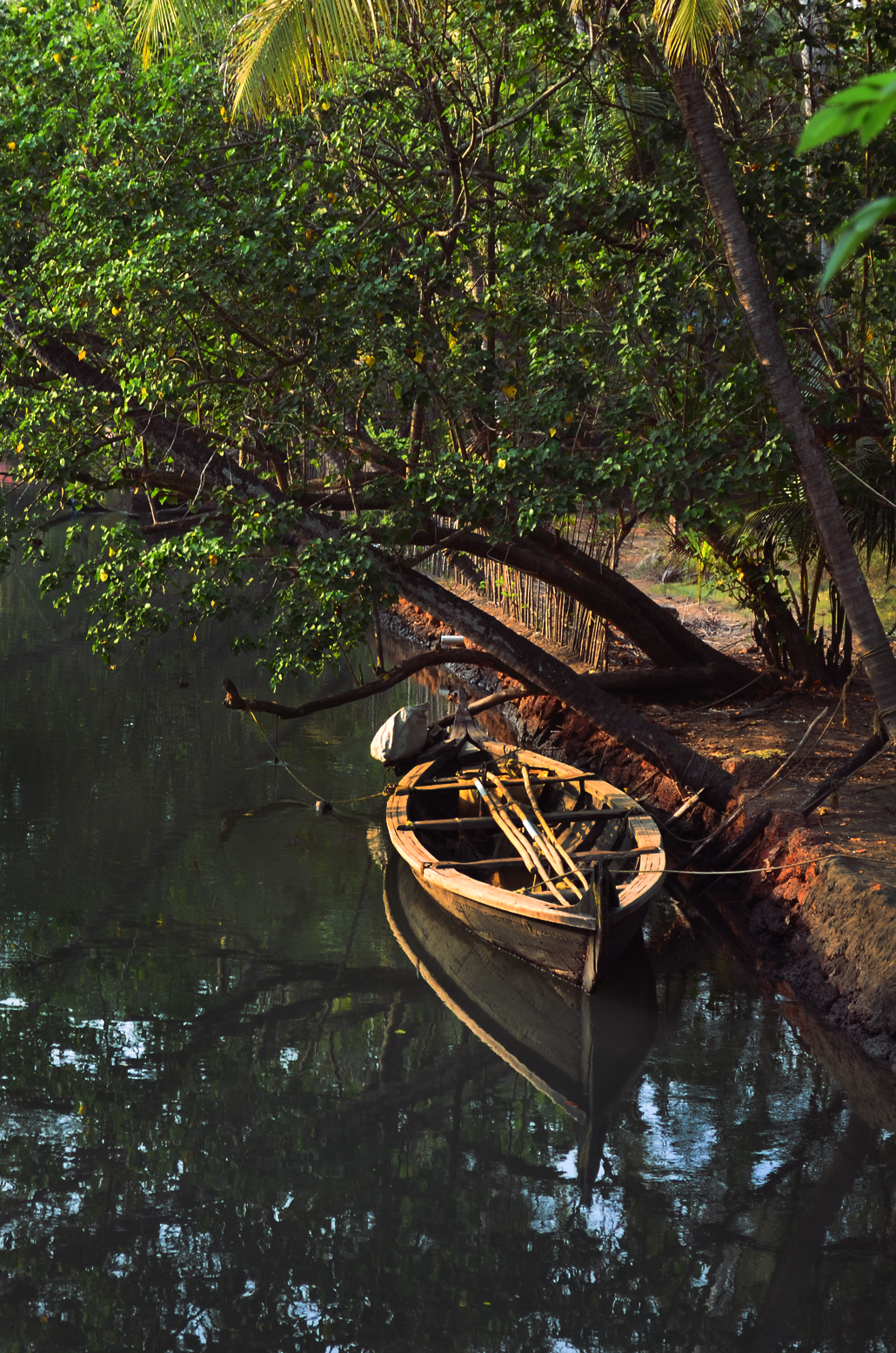
- Boat in Azhikode

- Location in Kerala, India Azhikode (India)
- Coordinates: 10°11′0″N 76°9′0″E
- Country: India
- State: Kerala
- District: Thrissur

Languages
  - Official: Malayalam, English
- Time zone: UTC+5:30 (IST)
- Vehicle registration: KL-47
- Nearest junction: Kappal bazar Kodungallur
- Website: www.azhikode.com

Azhikode is a coastal village in Kodungallur, Thrissur district, Kerala, India. The nearest towns are Kodungallur and Paravoor. Azhikode has a beach known as the munakkal beach. It has got the vast shore stretch around 3 km along the main beach side. It is the main attraction of this village. The main economic activity is fishing. The longest river in Kerala, Periyar River, joins Arabian sea at Azhikode-Munambam. Munambam of Vypin island of Kochi Taluk is situated on the other bank of the river. Munambam-Azhikode Harbour is colloquially known as Munambam harbour and is famous for fishing boats. A ferry boat is operating connecting Azhikkode with Munambam. Munambam–Azhikode Bridge is under construction.

== History ==
Azhikode was one of the major ports that linked Kerala to international trade and commerce. First church in India in the name of St. Thomas, who came here for the propagation of Christianity, is situated here. It is here where St. Thomas the apostle of Christ landed. The Cristian community of India had its inception here. St. Thomas is traditionally believed to have sailed to India in 52 AD to spread the Christian faith among the Jews, the Jewish diaspora present in Kerala at the time. He is supposed to have landed at the ancient port of Muziris (which became extinct in 1341 AD due to a massive flood which realigned the coasts) near Kodungalloor. He then went to Palayoor (near present-day Guruvayoor), which was a Hindu priestly community at that time. He left Palayoor in AD 52 for the southern part of what is now Kerala State, where he established the Ezharappallikal, or "Seven and Half Churches". These churches are at Kodungallur, Kollam, Niranam (Niranam St. Mary's Orthodox Church, Nilackal (Chayal), Kokkamangalam, Kottakkavu, Palayoor (Chattukulangara) and Thiruvithancode Arappally – the half church.

According to Indian Christian tradition, St. Thomas landed in Kodungallur in AD 52, in the company of a Jewish merchant Abbanes (Hebban). There were Jewish colonies in Kodungallur since ancient times and Jews continue to reside in Kerala till today, tracing their ancient history.

== Transportation and Occupation ==
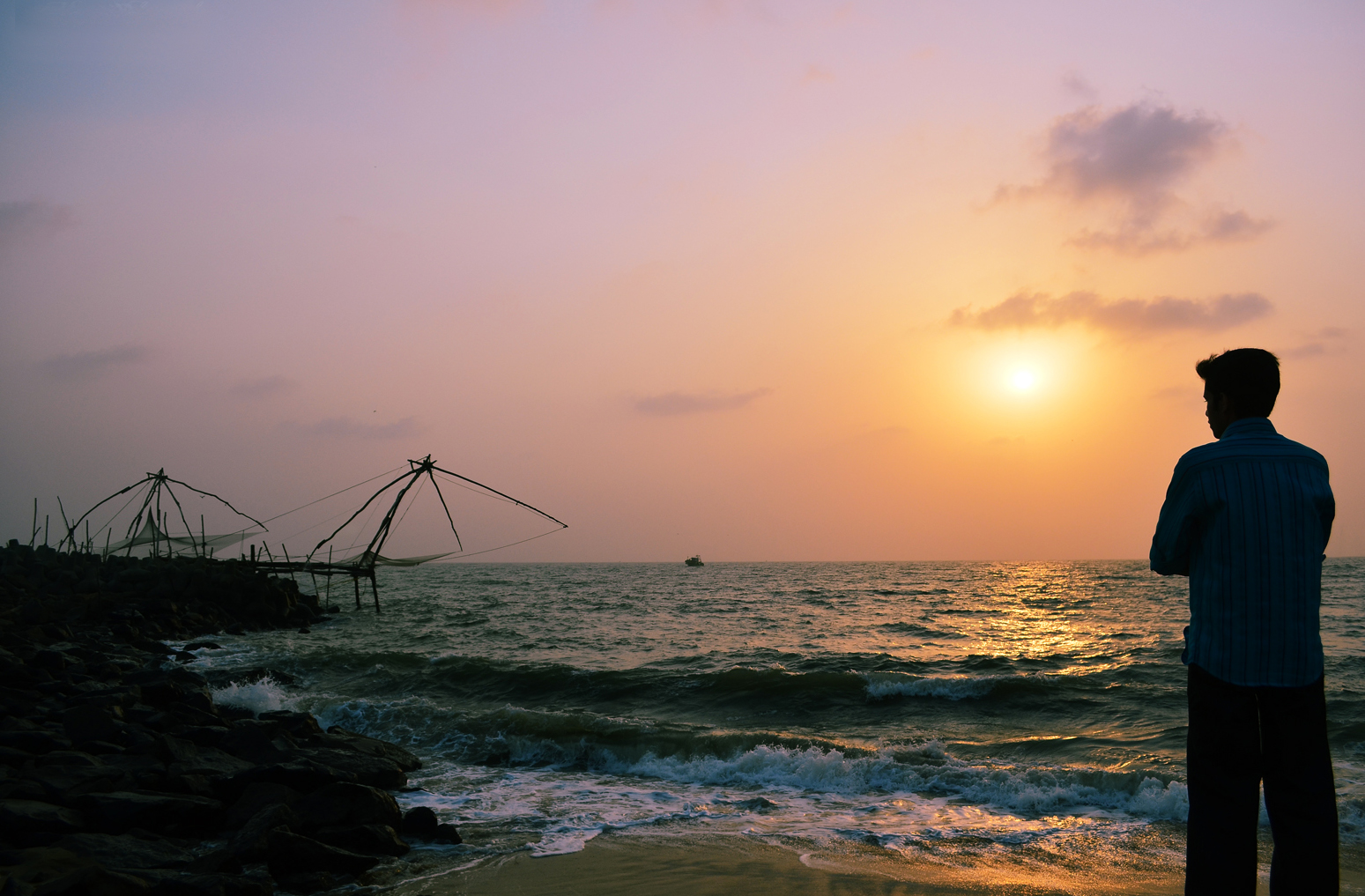
Azhikode Munakkal Beach

Azhikode Old harbour situated on the shores Periyar(Kottapuram) river joins Arabian sea, in Kodungallur Taluk. Azhikode was repeatedly eroded by tsunamis. The port that was situated in the old harbour was an important source of trade and commerce prior to British invasion. Azhikode is well connected by a series of canals. The famous Kodungallur Bhagavathy temple and Cheraman Juma Masjid is around 10 km away from this place.

Fishing and tourism are the main sources of revenue in this region. Traditional boats are still used for fishing in this area. Chinese fishing nets are still deployed for fishing. This region also has abundant cultivation of coconut. Shrimp cultivation is another major industry that contributes to the economy in this region
