= Fort Kochi =

Neighbourhood, Kochi, Kerala, India

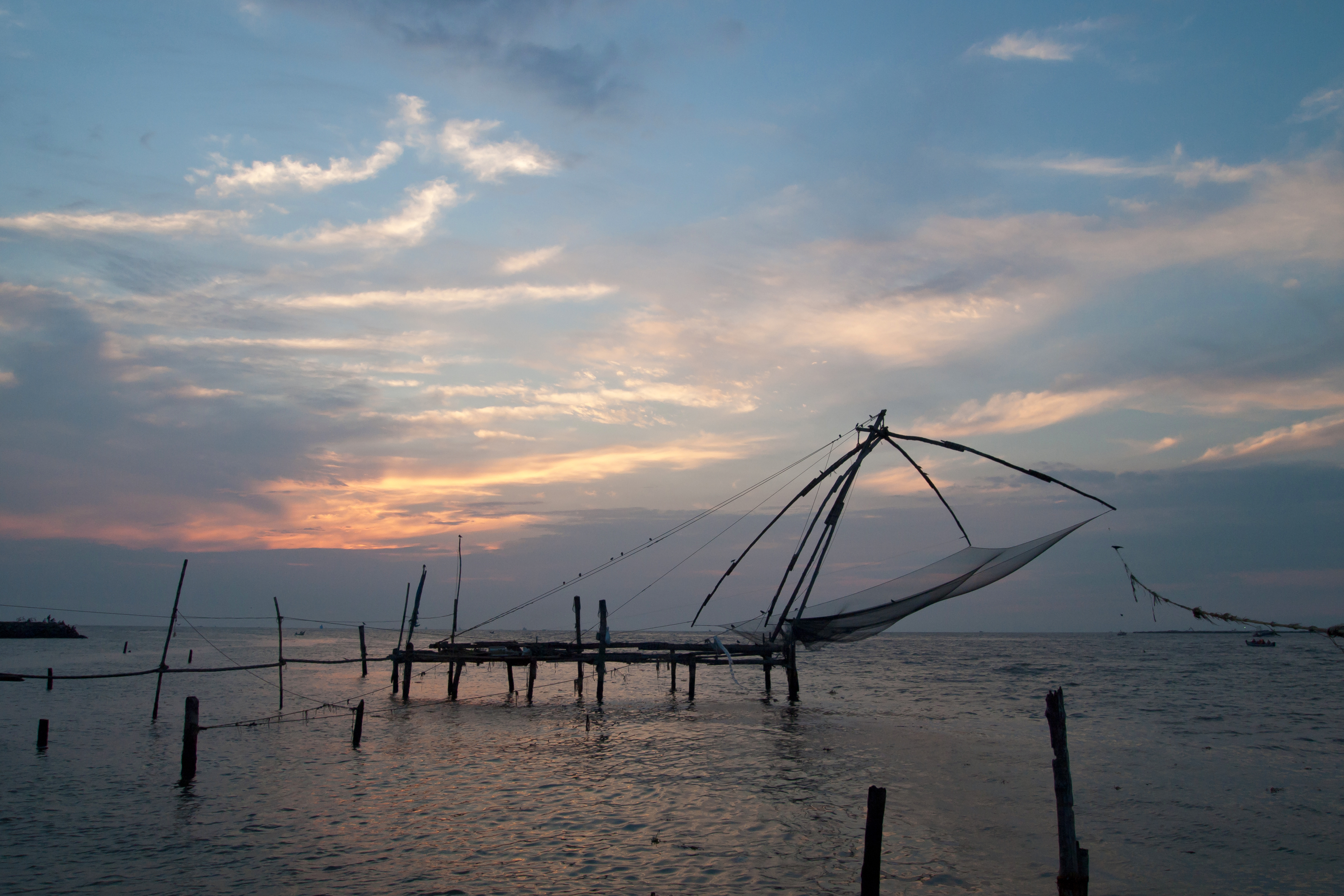

- Location within Kerala Location within India Location within Kochi
- Coordinates: 9.9658°N 76.2421°E
- Country: India
- State: Kerala
- District: Ernakulam
- Elevation: 29 m (95 ft)

Population
  - Total: 234,990

Languages
  - Official: Malayalam, English, Portuguese (historical)
- Time zone: UTC+5:30 (IST)
- PIN: 682001
- Telephone code: 0484
- Vehicle registration: KL-43

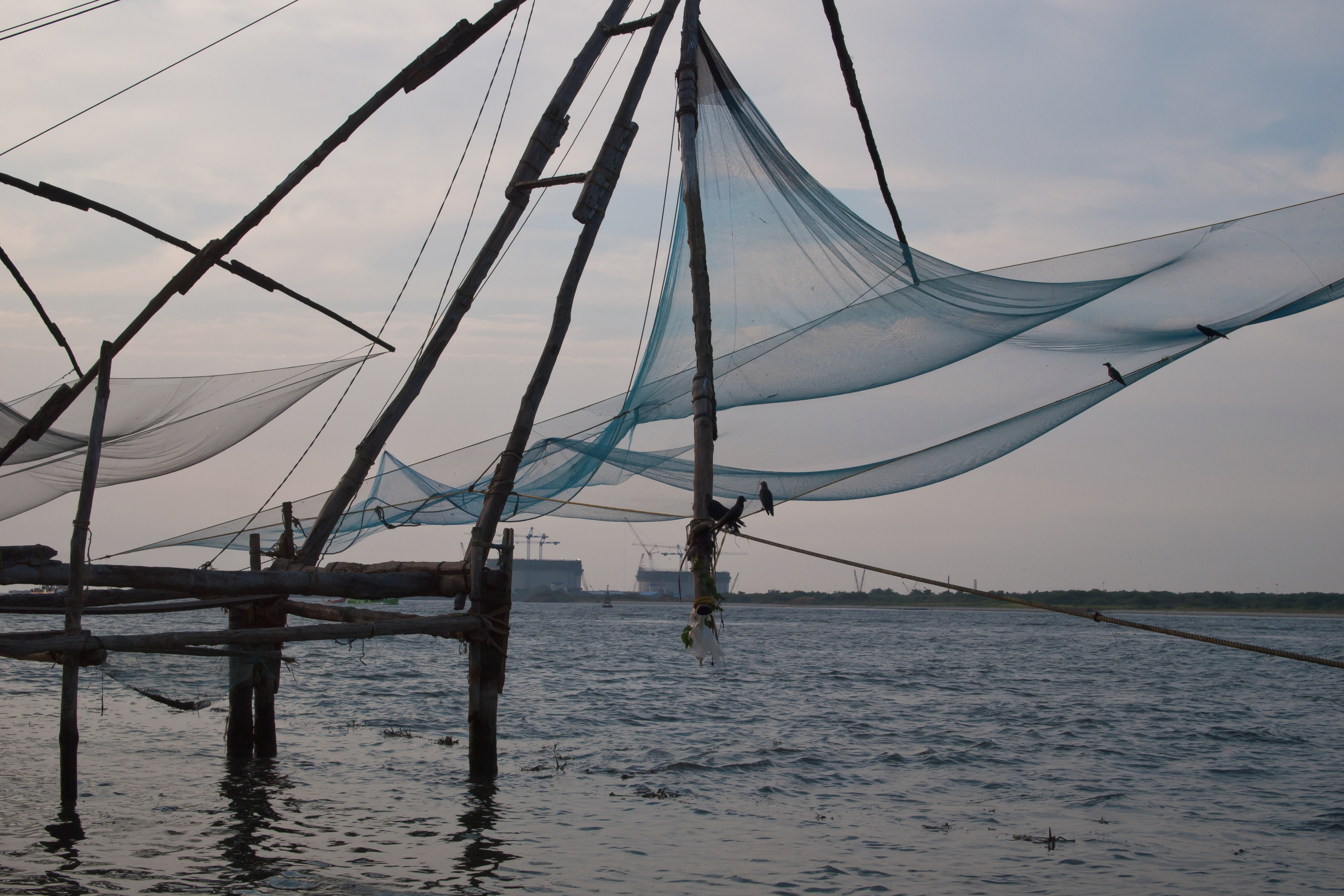
Cheena vala (Chinese fishing net)

Fort Kochi (/ˈkoʊtʃi/ KOH-chee, Malayalam: [cò:çi kō:tā]; Cochin Portuguese: Cochim de Baixo, European Portuguese: [kuˈʃĩ ðɨ ˈβaʃu]), formerly also known as Fort Cochin, is a region of Kochi city in Kerala, India. Fort Kochi takes its name from the Fort Manuel of Kochi, the first European fort on Indian soil, controlled by the Portuguese East Indies. This is part of a handful of water-bound islands and islets toward the south-west of the mainland Kochi, and collectively known as Old Kochi or West Kochi. Adjacent to this is the locality of Mattancherry. In 1967, these three municipalities along with a few adjoining areas, were amalgamated to form the Kochi Municipal Corporation.

Fort Kochi is known for its heritage and culture and is a prominent tourist destination for both domestic and international travellers. It was ranked ninth among the top 25 in National Geographic’s "Top Tourist Destinations to Explore In 2020".

== Connectivity ==
Fort Kochi can be reached from Ernakulam through roadways and water ways. Private buses and government transport buses travel from different parts of the city to Fort Kochi. Owing to the high volume of tourists visiting the place dedicated low floor Volvo buses were introduced to this route by the government. Such buses are in use on the popular routes such as Cochin International Airport (CIAL), Vyttila Mobility Hub and Kakkanad Info Park.

== Pre-colonial era ==
In the BC period, the region that is today known as Kerala was covered by mangrove woods. Turf and sand banks were created with the rise in sea-level which formed the shape of the coastal area seen today. The origin of the name Kochi is thought to be the Malayalam word kochu azhi, meaning 'small lagoon'. Mattancherry is the nerve town of old historic Kochi. In old Malayalam it is Maadan-cheri, from cheri meaning town. Maad or cow was the stamp of Old Royal Fort of Rajah of Kochi, who built his palace after the fall of Kodungallur port due to a gigantic tsunami in 1341 AD. The Perumpadappu Swaroopam, or the Fort of Rajah, had its palace on the banks of the Calvathy River. Due to frequent warring between King Zamorin of Kozhikode and the western colonial forces, the Rajah left the place for Tripunithura. The king had his vaishnav leanings and the cow or maadu was his symbol.

== History ==
The port at Kozhikode held superior economic and political position in medieval Kerala coast, while Kannur, Kollam, and Kochi were commercially important secondary ports, where the traders from various parts of the world would gather. Fort Kochi was a fishing village in the Kingdom of Kochi in the pre-colonial Kerala. The Portuguese arrived at Kappad Kozhikode in 1498 during the Age of Discovery, thus opening a direct sea route from Europe to India. The territory that would be later known as Fort Kochi was granted to the Portuguese in 1503 by the Rajah of Kochi, after the forces of Afonso de Albuquerque helped him fighting the forces of Saamoothiri of Kozhikode. The Rajah also gave them permission to build Fort Emmanuel near the waterfront to protect their commercial interests. The first part of the name Fort Kochi comes from this fort, which the Dutch later destroyed. The Portuguese built their settlement behind the fort, including a wooden church, which was rebuilt in 1516 as a permanent structure, today known as the St Francis Church. Fort Kochi remained in Portuguese possession for 160 years. In 1683 the Dutch captured the territory from the Portuguese, destroyed many Portuguese institutions, particularly Catholic including convents. The Dutch held Fort Kochi in their possession for 112 years until 1795, when the British took control by defeating the Dutch. Foreign control of Fort Kochi ended in 1947 with the Indian independence.

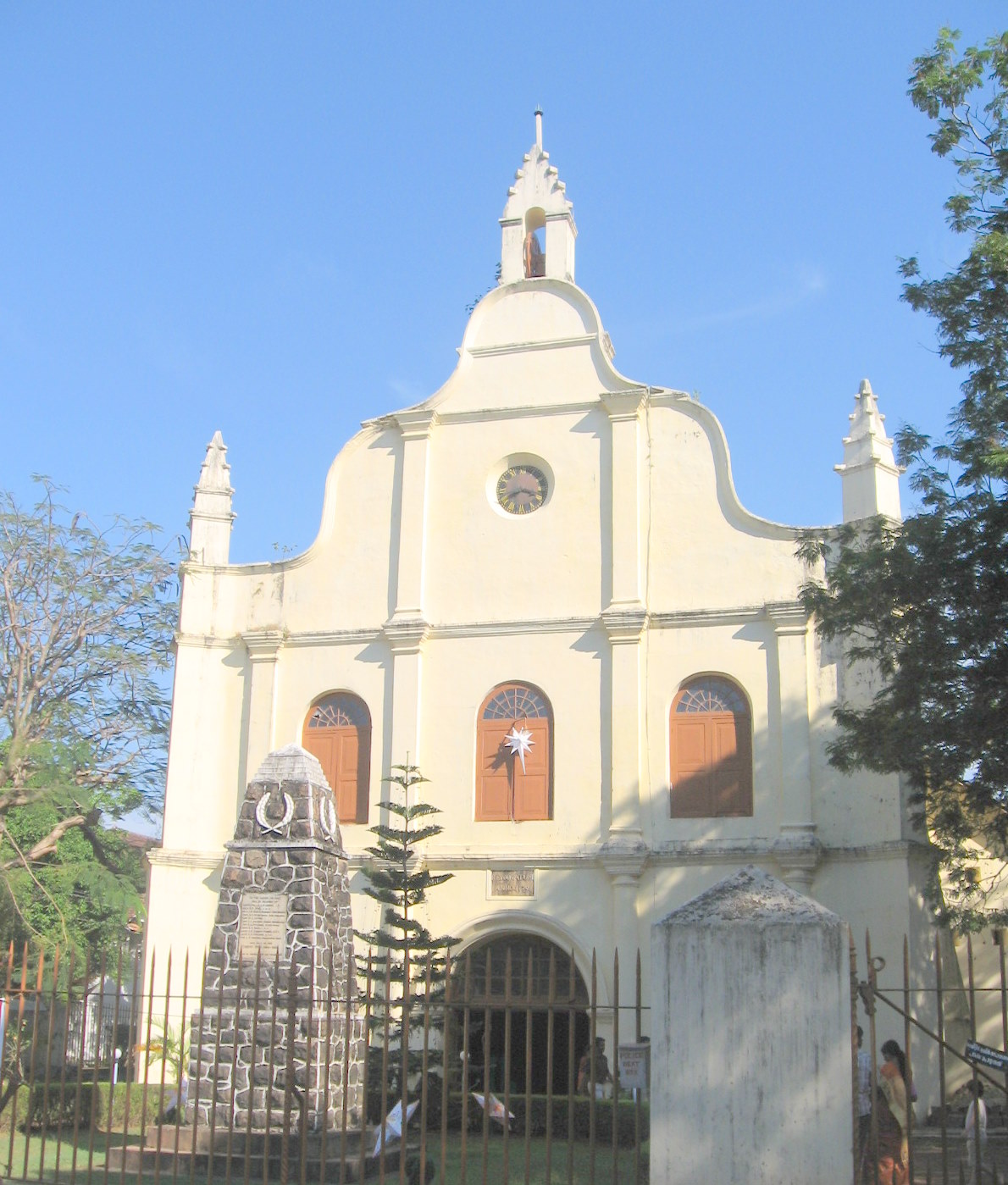
St Francis Church where Vasco da Gama was buried

A mix of old houses built by the Portuguese, Dutch and British in these colonial periods line the streets of Fort Kochi. St Francis Church was built in 1503 by the Portuguese as a Catholic church. Vasco da Gama was once buried in this church which now falls under the Church of South India and is one of the national monuments. Catholic Diocese of Cochin was erected under Portuguese Padroado in 1558 with its headquarters in Fort Kochi. Santa Cruz Basilica, also built by the Portuguese in the 16th century, was later destroyed by the British and rebuilt near the end of 19th century. From this period there are other residential buildings and hotels such as the Old Harbour House, some of which have been renovated in more recent times. The landmark that causes more public and visitor interest is a series of precolonial Chinese fishing nets on the waterfront, believed to have been introduced by Chinese traders in the early 14th century.

=== First sources ===
Since the beginning of the Common Era, Arabian and Chinese traders sourced spices, especially pepper, cinnamon, cardamom, cloves, sandal wood, etc. from the Kochi region. Cultivation and trade of these valuable goods shaped the history of the region. Even today, Kochi is an important centre of spice export. The Arabian traders were the first to know about these spices, and they carried the highly wanted merchandise to Europe. Centuries later, they were followed by the Portuguese, then the Dutch, and afterwards the British.

=== Around 600 AD ===
Written documents about the Malabar Coast show that this region had Hindus, Christians, and a Jewish minority.

=== Around 1341 ===
The natural harbour of Kochi was created by a flood that also destroyed the harbour of the town Kodungallur. Thereafter, the town developed into one of the most important harbours on the West Coast of India. It concentrated on the spice trade with China and the Middle East.

=== Around 1500 ===
During this period, Kozhikode was ruled by king Zamorin and Kochi was ruled by the Maharaja of Kochi. This was the time when the first Portuguese ships berthed at the Malabar Coast: Vasco da Gama in Kozhikode and Pedro Álvares Cabral in Kochi. The Maharaja of Kochi felt threatened by the Zamorin of Kozhikode, and he hoped that the Portuguese would help him in his defense from the neighbouring king of Kozhikode. The Maharaja welcomed the Portuguese, and they founded their first trading center in Kochi. However, the Maharaja of Kochi was largely deprived of his power, and Kochi became the first European colony in India. The Portuguese put pressure upon the small Jewish community, and even the Syrian Christians as they were practising Nestorianism. The Portuguese tried to merge the Syrian Christian Church with the Latin Church. This created conflict as most of the Syrian Christians were associated with various churches of the East and rejected the authority of the Pope and the Latin Church. This led to the famous Coonan Kurish Oath that took place at Coonan Kurish Church, MattancherryFrancis Xavier also baptised several thousand, which increased the Catholic population in Kochi.

=== Around 1663 ===
At the invitation of a deposed prince of Cochin Royal Family and the hereditary Prime Minister of Cochin, namely the Paliath Achan, the Dutch came to Kochi and conquered Kochi in 1663. The town became the capital of Dutch Malabar and belonged to the worldwide trading network of the Dutch East India Company. The Dutch also destroyed many Catholic institutions in Kochi.

=== 18th century ===
Around 1760, there came uneasy times for Kochi because of trouble between the regional powers. Kochi was devastated by Hyder Ali, then later by his son Tipu Sultan. Tipu Sultan subordinated the town temporarily to the kingdom of Mysore.

Kochi came under the influence of the British circa 1790.

=== 19th century ===
In 1814, Kochi became a part of the Madras Presidency, becoming a part of the British colonial empire. The British shaped the country until the 20th century, and Kochi has always been an important harbour and trade center.

The municipality of Fort Kochi was formed on 1 November 1866 according to the Madras Act 10 of 1865 (Amendment of the Improvements in Towns act 1850) of the British Indian Empire, along with the municipalities of Kozhikode, Kannur, Thalassery, and Palakkad, making them the first modern municipalities in the modern state of Kerala, as a part of the Malabar District.

In January 1889, the Great fire of Cochin destroyed approximately 300 houses and commercial properties.

== Gallery ==
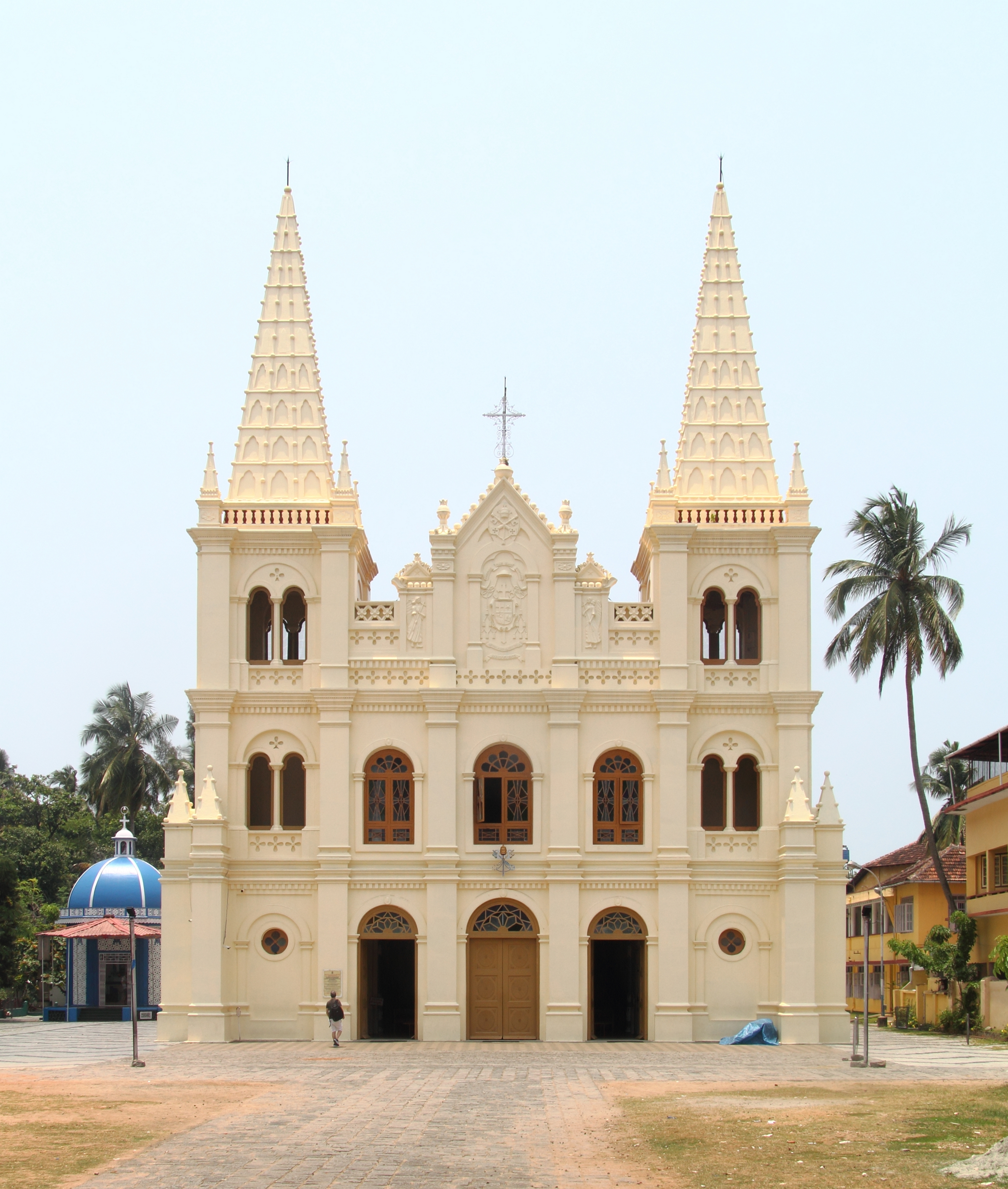
Santa Cruz Cathedral Basilica

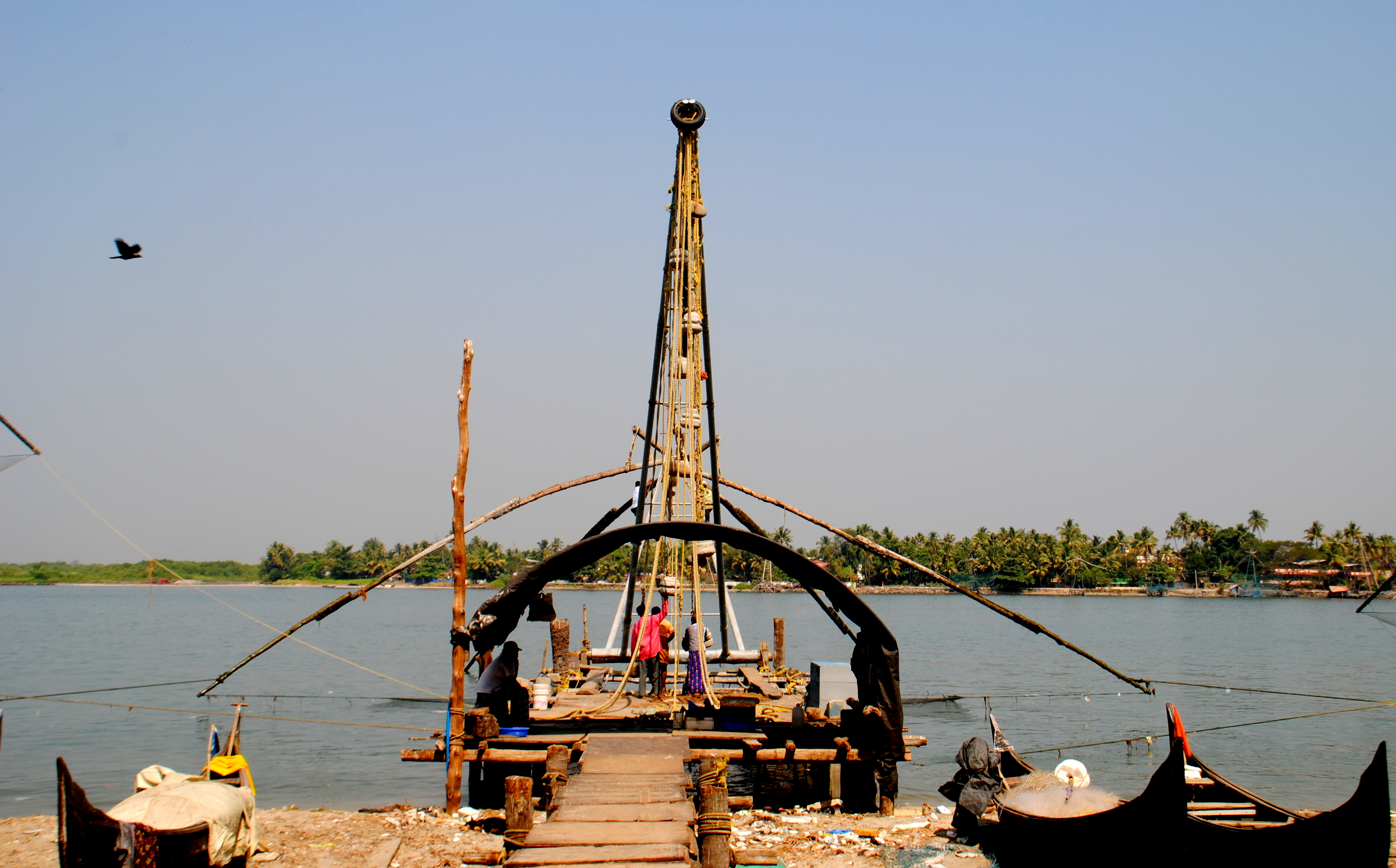
Common scene of Kochi

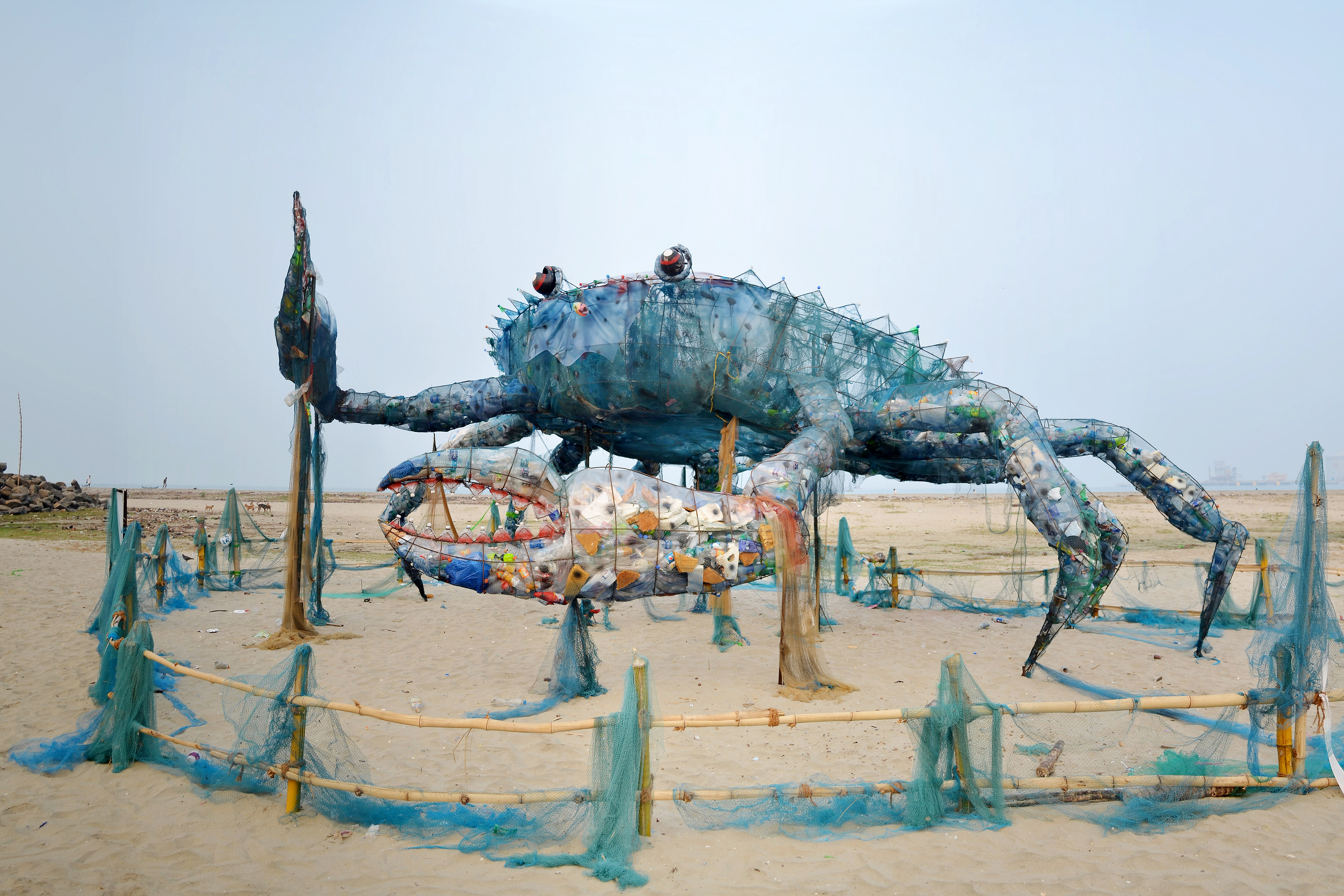
Crab structure made with discarded plastic bottles at Fort Kochi

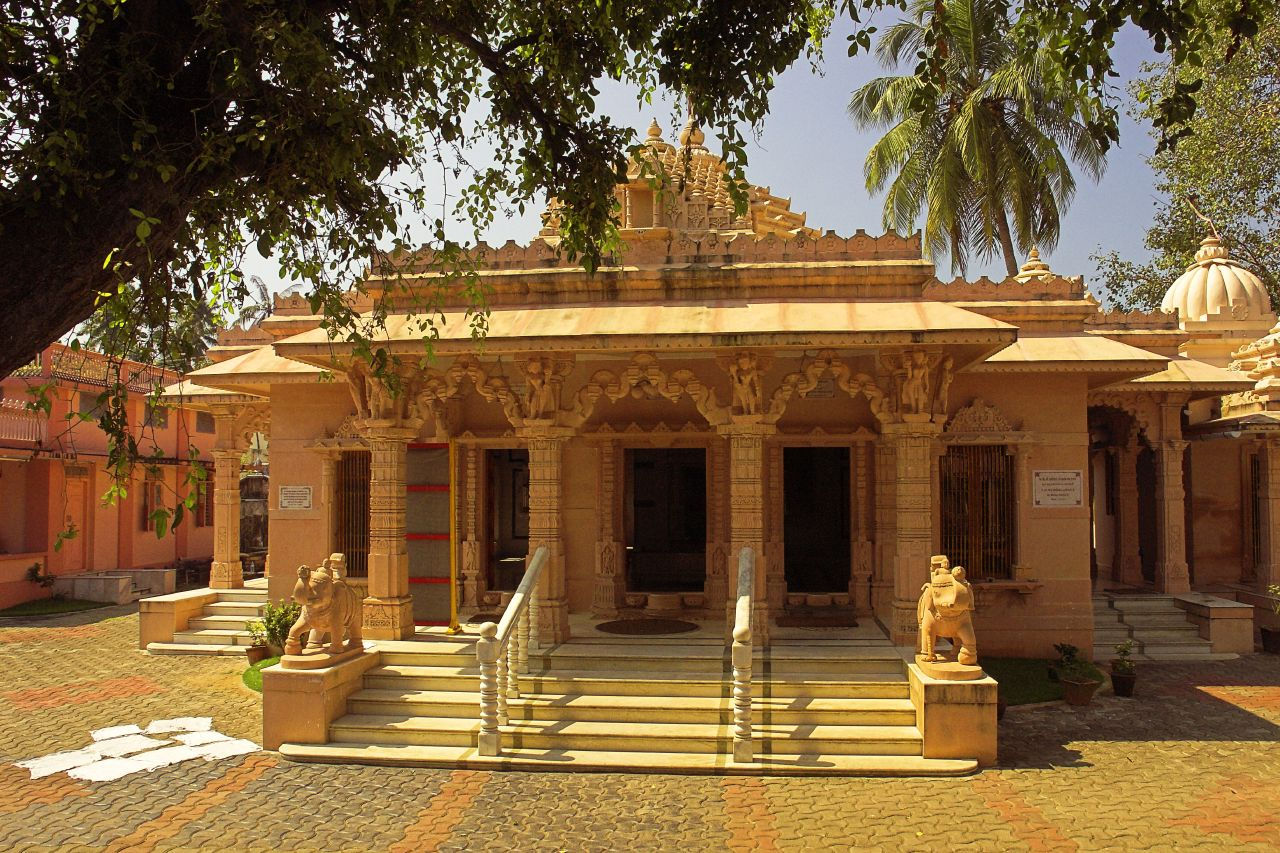
Jain temple in Fort Kochi

Fort Kochi Dutch Cemetery

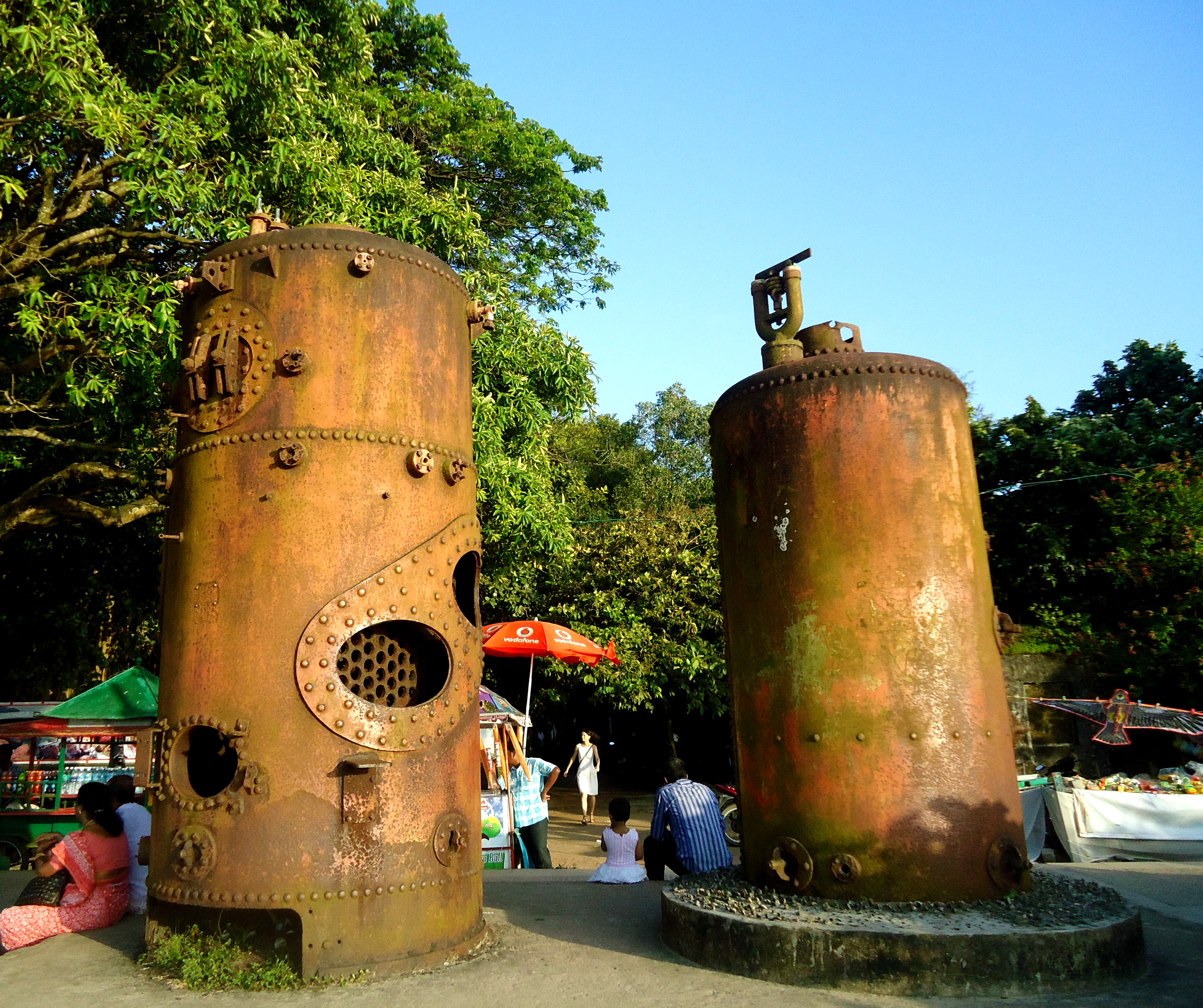
Steam Boilers in Fort Kochi Beach

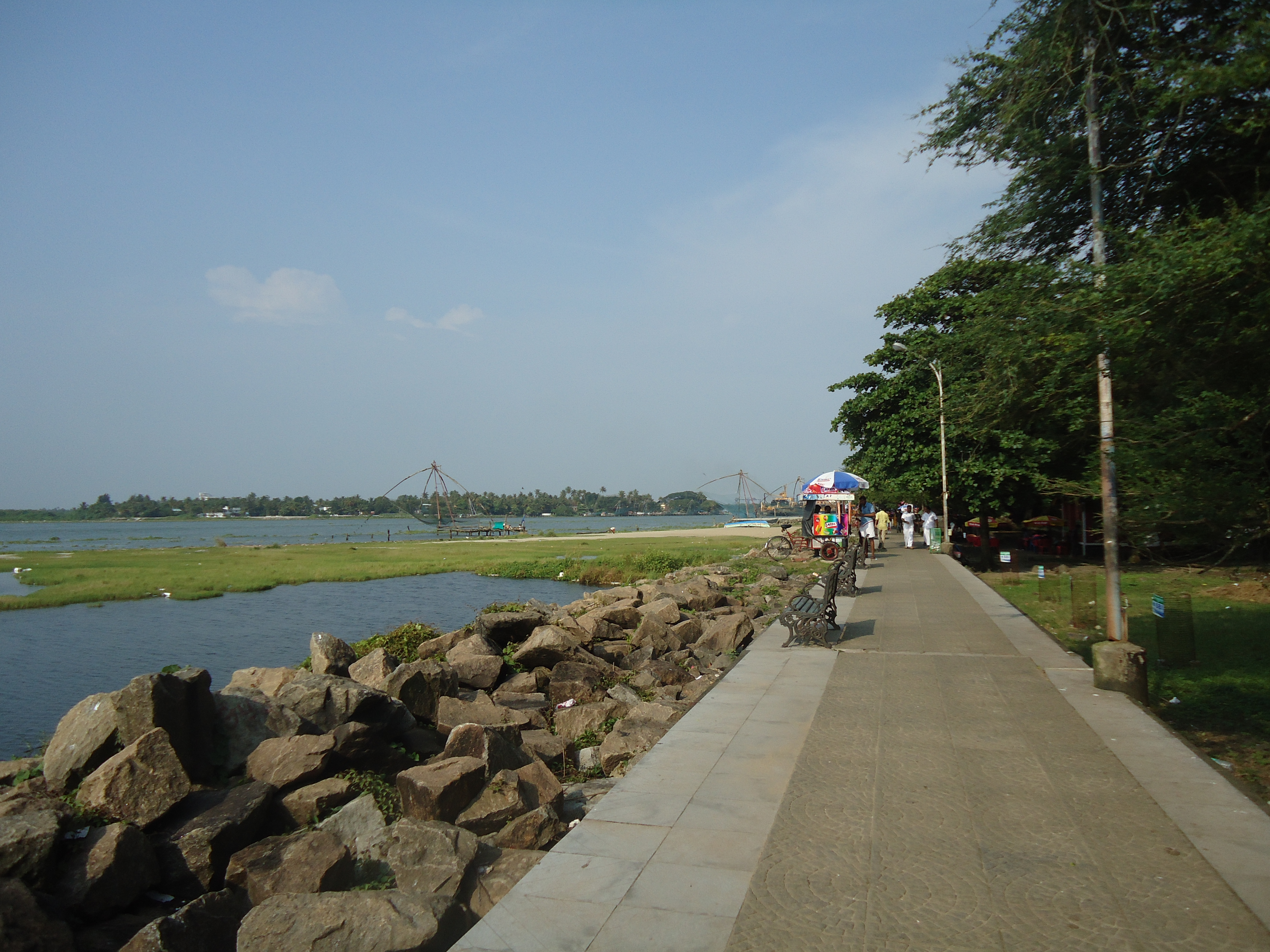
Fort Kochi Beach Walkway

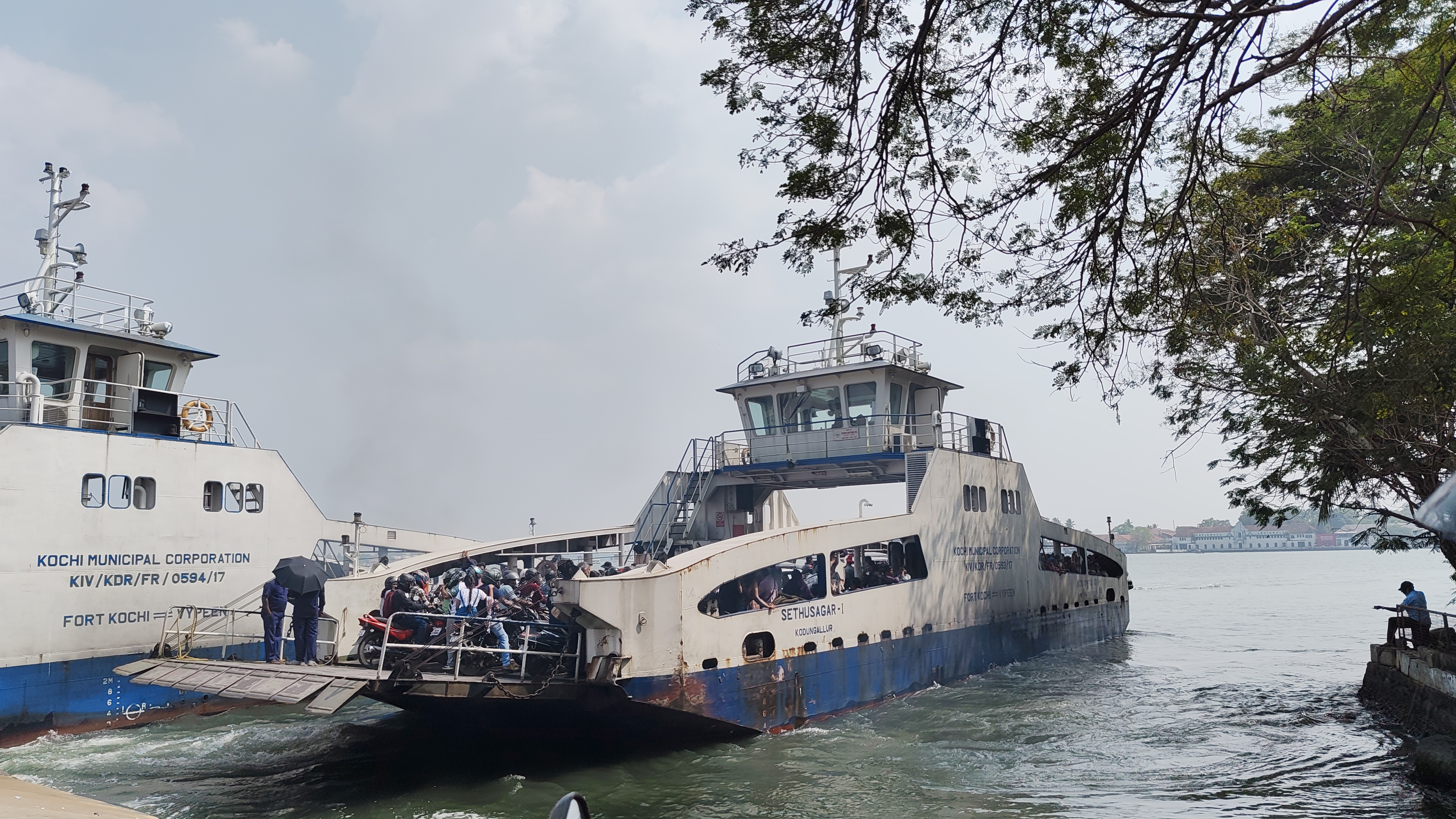
Fort Kochi Jankar service

== Main tourist attractions ==
- Cochin Carnival
- Indo-Portuguese museum
- Fort Kochi Beach
- Kochi Dutch Cemetery
- Cochin Thirumala Devaswom
- Sree Gopalakrishna Devaswom Temple (The Only Daivajna Brahmin Temple in Kerala)
- Koonan Kurish Church, Mattancherry; the church where Coonan Kurish Oath took place.
- Our Lady of Life Church Mattancherry
- St Lawrence Church Edacochin
- St Louis Church Mundamveli
- St. Francis Church
- Santa Cruz Cathedral Basilica
- Bishop's House-Roman Catholic Diocese Of Cochin
- Fort Emmanuel
- Jewish Synagogue
- Mattancherry Palace
- Jain Temple
- Our Lady of Hope Church
- Kochi-Muziris Biennale
