= St Louis Church, Mundamveli =

St Louis Church Mundamveli
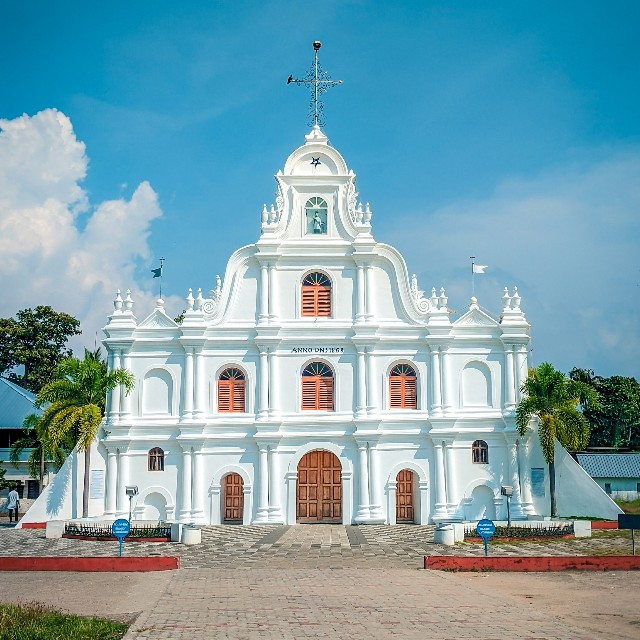
- St Louis Church Mundamveli
- St Louis Church Mundamveli
- 09°55′21.3708″N 76°15′45.7524″E
- Location: Kochi, Ernakulam, Kerala
- Country: India
- Denomination: Catholic Church

History
- Founded: 9th century

Architecture
- Functional status: Active
- Completed: 1868

Administration
- Diocese: Roman Catholic Diocese of Cochin

Clergy
- Bishop: Antony Kattiparambil
- Vicar: Rev Fr Johnson Chirammel: Rev Fr Sachin Pazherikal

St. Louis Church (Saantiyago Church) is located in Mundamveli, Kochi in the Indian state of Kerala. It is 9 km from the Ernakulam Junction railway station. The church is believed to be more than 150 years old.
