= Kunjathur =

- Census Town
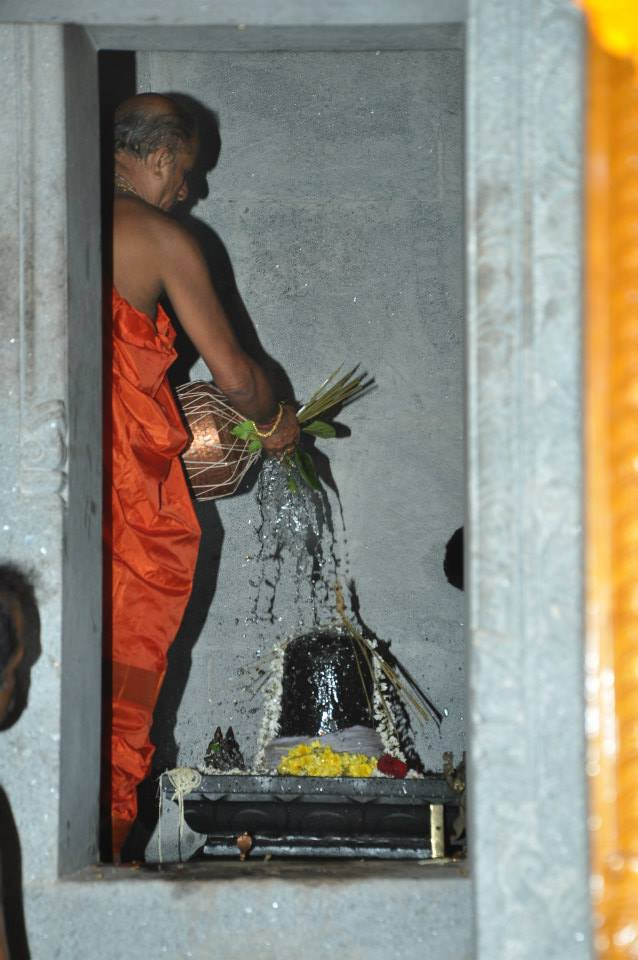
- Mahalingeshwara Temple, Kunjathur
- Nickname: Kunja Nadu
- Location in Kerala, India
- Coordinates: 12°44′35″N 74°53′10″E
- Country: India
- State: Kerala
- District: Kasaragod

Government
  - Type: Panchayati raj (India)
  - Body: Manjeshwar Grama Panchayat

Area
  - Total: 12.65 km^{2} (4.88 sq mi)

Population (2011)
  - Total: 13,633
  - Density: 1,078/km^{2} (2,791/sq mi)

Languages
  - Official: Malayalam, Kannada, English
  - Spoken: Malayalam, Tulu
- Time zone: UTC+5:30 (IST)
- Postal code: 671323
- Vehicle registration: KL-14

Kunjathur is a census town in Kasaragod district in the state of Kerala, India. It is located 22 km (14 mi) south of Mangalore.

== Demographics ==
As of 2011 Census, Kunjathur had a population of 13,633, where 6,729 are males and 6,904 are females. Kunjathur census town has an area of 12.65 km^{2} (4.88 sq mi) with 2,634 families residing in it. In Kunjathur, 12.3% of the population was under the age of 6. Kunjathur had an average literacy of 90.2%, lower than state average of 94%: male literacy was 94.9%, and female literacy was 85.7%.

== Religions ==
As of 2011 census, Kunjathur town had 13,633 population, which comprises 6,824 Muslims (50.1%), 5,924 Hindus (43.5%), 852 Christians (6.2%) and Others (0.2%).

== Transportation ==
Local roads have access to National Highway No.66 which connects to Mangalore in the north and Calicut in the south. The nearest railway station is Manjeshwar on Shoranur-Mangalore section under southern railway zone. The nearest airport is at Mangalore.

== Languages ==
This locality is an essentially multi-lingual region. The people speak Malayalam, Tulu, Beary bashe, Konkani and Dakhini Urdu . Migrant workers also speak Hindi and Tamil languages.

== Administration ==
This village is part of Manjeswaram assembly constituency which is again part of Kasaragod (Lok Sabha constituency)
