= St. George Forane Church, Edathua =

Coordinates: 9.3670°N 76.4755°E

Edathua St. George Syro-Malabar Catholic Forane Church
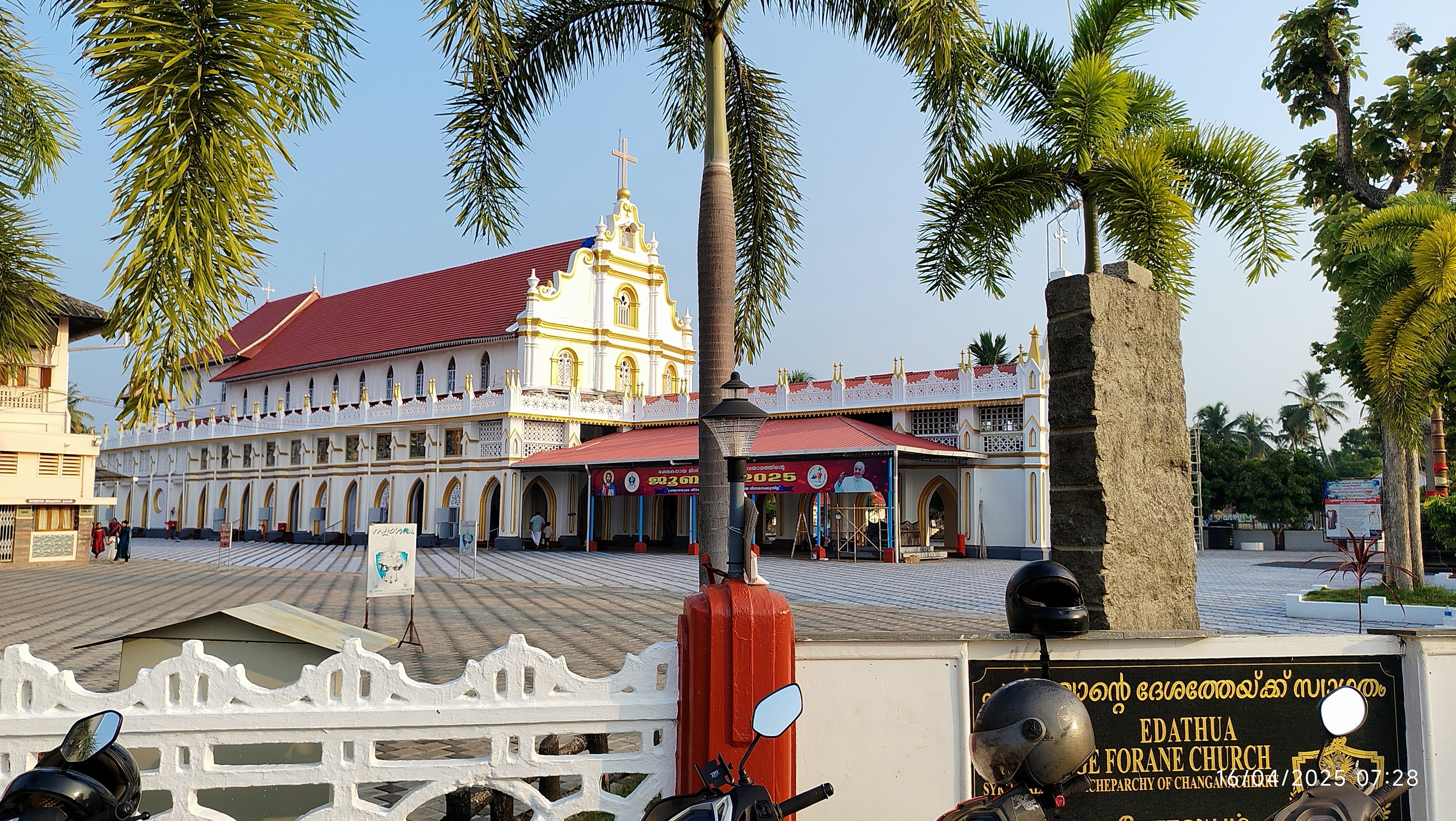
- Edathua Church side view
- Edathua St. George Syro-Malabar Catholic Forane Church
- Location: Edathua, Alappuzha
- Country: India
- Denomination: Syro-Malabar Catholic
- Website: www.edathuachurch.in

History
- Dedication: Saint George
- Consecrated: AD 1810

Administration
- Archdiocese: Syro-Malabar Catholic Archeparchy of Changanassery

Clergy
- Vicar: Very Rev. Fr. Joseph Kalarickal

St. George Syro-Malabar Catholic Forane Church, Edathua, also known as Edathua Valiapally is a parish of Syro-Malabar Catholic Church located in Edathua, India. Saint George is the patron saint of the church. It is one of the pilgrimage centre in Kerala located at Edathua on the bank of Pamba River in Alappuzha District, Kerala. This church is controlled by Syro-Malabar Catholic Archeparchy of Changanassery.

== History ==
Edathua Church was constructed by a group of believers who severed ties with Champakulam diocese in 1810. It is located on the bank of river Pumba, about 15 km south east of Alappuzha. It is believed that, because of the saint's miraculous power, many devotees flowed to Edathua pally, especially during the saint's feast conducted from April 27 to May 7 of every year. Devotees in great numbers across the southern parts of the country visit the church during this feast. The blessing received through the intercession of Saint George transformed Edathua into a permanent pilgrim center of South India. Apart from Edathua Church, Arthunkal Church and Thumpoly Church are among the other major Christian pilgrim centers of Alappuzha.

== See also ==
- Syro-Malabar Church
- Syro-Malabar Catholic Archeparchy of Changanacherry
- Christianity in India
- St. George
- Christianity in Kerala
- Kuttanad
- Alappuzha
- Kerala
