= Stephen Athipozhiyil =

Indian Latin Catholic bishop (1944–2022)

His Excellency Stephen Athipozhiyil
- Former Bishop of Alleppey
- Church: Catholic Church (Latin Church)
- Diocese: Alleppey
- Installed: 9 December 2001
- Term ended: 11 October 2019
- Predecessor: Peter Michael Chenaparampil
- Successor: James Raphael Anaparambil
- Previous post: Coadjutor Bishop of Alleppey (2000–2001)

Orders
- Ordination: 5 October 1969 by Michael Arattukulam
- Consecration: 11 February 2001 by Peter Michael Chenaparampil

Personal details
- Born: 18 May 1944 Chennavely, British Raj
- Died: 9 April 2022 (aged 77) Arthunkal, Kerala, India

Stephen Athipozhiyil (18 May 1944 – 9 April 2022) was an Indian Catholic prelate.

Athipozhiyil was born in India and was ordained to the priesthood in 1969. He served as coadjutor bishop of the Diocese of Alleppey in 2001 and then as diocesan bishop from 2001 until his retirement in 2019.

Athipozhyil was a member of the Justice, Peace and Development Commission of the Kerala Catholic Bishops' Council (KCBC), chairman of the KCBC Commission for Scheduled Castes/Scheduled Tribes/Backward ommunities and Vice Chairman of the KCBC Charismatic Commission.

Catholic Church titles
Preceded by Peter Michael Chenaparampil	Bishop of Alleppey; 2001–2019	Succeeded by James Raphael Anaparambil
