= The Last Supper (A.T. John Arasery) =

1933 monumental oil painting by A.T. John in Alappuzha, India

- Anthima Bhojanam, അന്തിമഭോജനം (Malayalam)
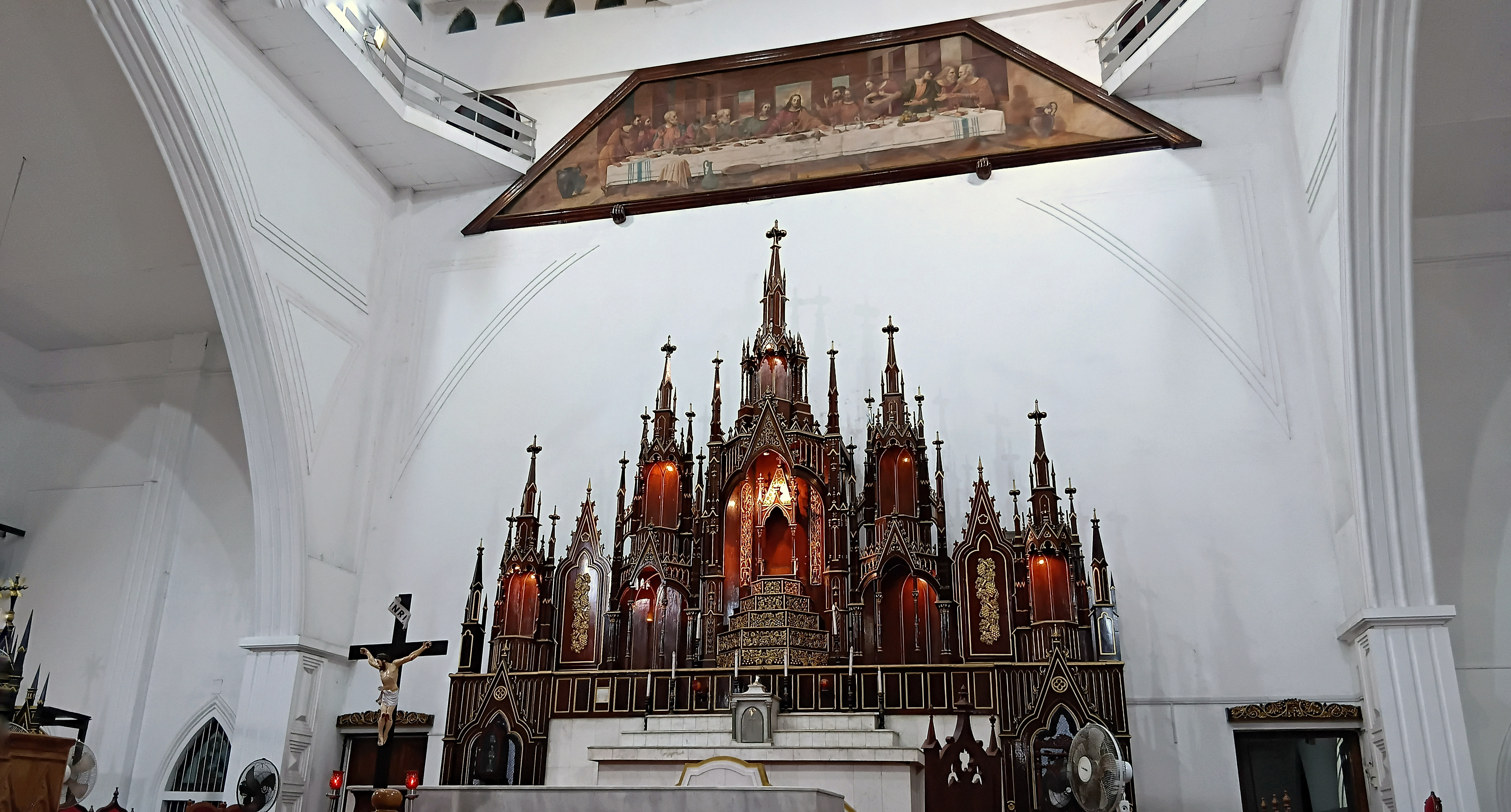
- The painting situated above the main altar of Mount Carmel Cathedral, Alappuzha.
- Artist: A.T. John Arasery
- Year: 1933
- Medium: Oil painting
- Subject: The Last Supper
- Dimensions: 426 cm × 1219 cm (168 in × 480 in)
- Condition: Well-preserved
- Location: Mount Carmel Cathedral, Alappuzha, Alappuzha, Kerala

The Last Supper (Malayalam: Anthima Bhojanam) is a monumental oil painting by the Indian artist A.T. John Arasery, located within the Mount Carmel Cathedral, Alappuzha in Kerala, India. Completed in 1933, the painting is notable for its massive scale, measuring 40 feet in length and 14 feet in height, making it significantly larger than Leonardo da Vinci's famous mural of the same subject.

== History ==
The painting was commissioned for the Mount Carmel Cathedral, a historic church established in 1809 under the Diocese of Cochin. A.T. John, a native of Arthunkal and a graduate of the Madras School of Fine Arts, completed the work on September 6, 1933. In 1994, a significant portion of the old cathedral structure collapsed; however, the painting and the ancient altar remained undamaged. When the new cathedral was constructed, the artwork was reinstalled in its original position above the high altar.

== Composition and significance ==
The artwork is an oil painting depiction of the Last Supper of Jesus Christ with his apostles. While inspired by the composition of Leonardo da Vinci's The Last Supper, John’s version is distinguished by its sheer physical dimensions. The painting is recognized for its longevity and preservation, with its colors remaining vibrant despite being over 90 years old. It is considered the "magnum opus" of A.T. John, who served as an art teacher at the SDV School and an artist for Sanatana Dharma College, Alappuzha. The work attracts numerous visitors, including artists and historians, particularly during the season of Lent and Maundy Thursday.
