= Edathua =

- Village
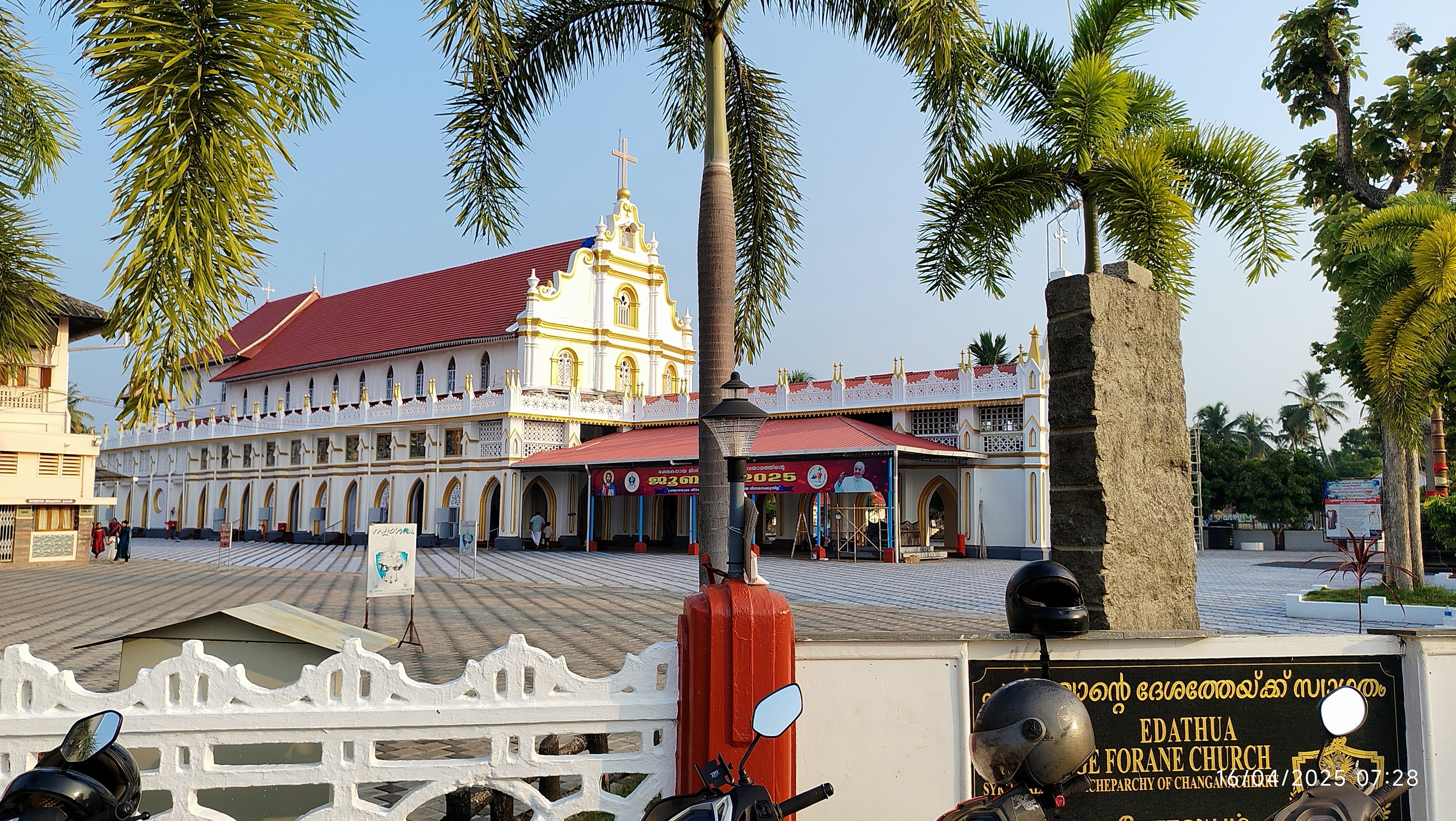
- St. George Syro-Malabar Catholic Forane Church

- Location in Kerala, India Edathua (India)
- Coordinates: 9°22′0″N 76°28′0″E
- Country: India
- State: Kerala
- District: Alappuzha/Alleppey

Language
  - Spoken: Malayalam, English
- Time zone: UTC+5:30 (IST)
- PIN: 689573
- Telephone code: (0477 221...)
- Vehicle registration: KL-66
- Nearest Cities: Thiruvalla & Haripad

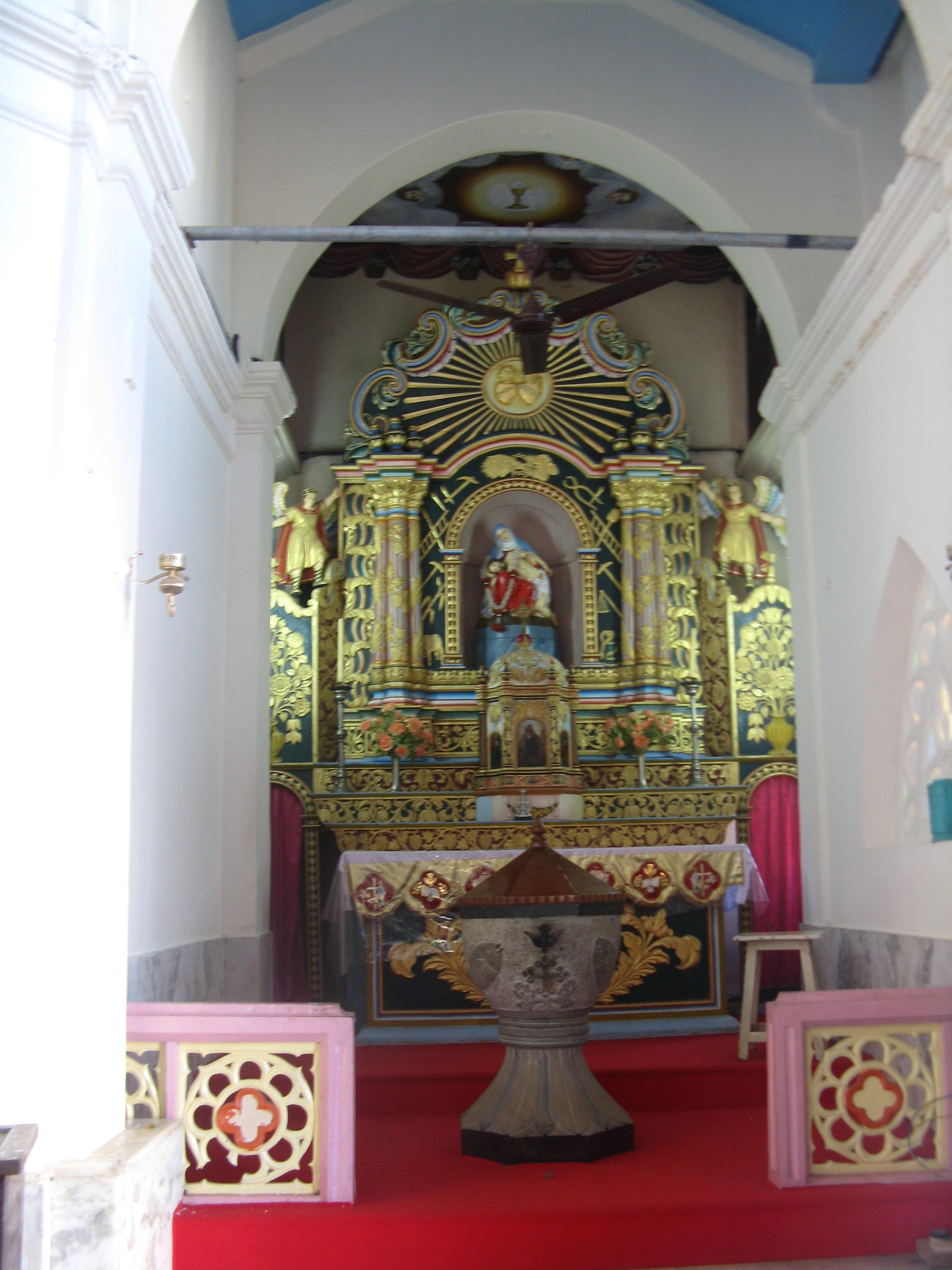
Inside the church

Edathua is a small village in Kuttanad, Alappuzha district, Kerala, India. It is located 12 km from Thiruvalla city center, National Highway 183 and the Thiruvalla railway station.

== Pilgrim Center ==
St. George Syro-Malabar Catholic Forane Church, Edathua is the major pilgrim center of the area. The Feast of St. George is a major festival here. People from Tamil Nadu, Andhra Pradesh, Telangana and elsewhere attend the feast.

== Geography ==
Edathua is in the Kuttanad region. It lies below sea level: agricultural land (rice farms) in this region are separated from big and small rivers by high mud levees (bunds called Puravaramp). Farmers and agricultural workers build their dwellings on reclaimed land by expanding upon these levees around these paddy fields known as padam. These levees are also often planted with coconut trees, a major commercial crop in the region. The area attracts a lot of foreign tourists.

== Attraction ==
Situated on the banks of a branch of the Pamba river, the massive shrine St. George Syro-Malabar Catholic Forane Church, 23 kilometres (14 mi) south-east of Alappuzha and 12 kilometres (7.5 mi) south-west of Thiruvalla and built more than 200 years ago resembles the churches of medieval Europe.

The Ambalappuzha Sree Krishna temple is about 20 km from Edathua.

The very ancient St. Marys Orthodox Church, Niranam, believed to have been originally established by Thomas the Apostle, the disciple of Jesus Christ, in the 1st century AD, is 9 km south-east of Edathua.

There are a number of ancient Hindu temples with interesting legends and history in the surrounding villages of Edathua such as Changankary, Pandankary, Mithrakkary, Kozhimukk, Thalavady and Veeyapuram.

Veeyapuram also has a Muslim mosque.

Chakkulathukavu Temple is less than 5 km east of Edathua.

The Haripad Subrahmanya Swamy temple is about 13 km from Edathua.

The Mannarasala Temple, believed to be more than 3000 years old, is just a few kilometres south of Edathua.

It is said that Edathua got its name because in ancient times it was a "resting spot" (edathavalam), for the king's men and traders traveling by river.

== Festivals ==
The annual feast of the St. George Forane Catholic church starts on 27th April with the hoisting of the flag and concludes on 14th May.

During the feast, the statue of St. George, decked in gold regalia, is carried out and placed on the dais at the center of the church.

Devotees from other states are the main contributors to this Church feast. The feast, known as "Edathua Perunnal", helped Edathua to develop as one of the most important commercial centers in Kuttanad region. During the feast family members from outside Edathua, especially from the southern Kollam, Trivandrum side of Kerala and Kanyakumari District of Tamil Nadu, come and visit their relatives. During the 10-day feast, many devotees stay and cook food in the church premises and take part in ritual bathing in the river in front of the church. The church is colorfully illuminated, and there is a fireworks display. Apart from Edathua Church, Arthunkal Church and Thumboly Church are the major Christian churches of Alappuzha district where the festival and pilgrimage are held.

== Educational institutions ==
- St. Aloysius College, Edathua is the only arts and science college in Kuttanad.
- St. Aloysius Higher Secondary School
- St. Mary's Girls High School
- Georgian Public School & Junior College, Edathua.
- Marthoma Syrian Girls High School, Anaprampal
- Holy Angels Senior Secondary School, Edathua

== Prominent people ==
Varghese Augustine Punchaichira, the first elected Member of the Legislative Assembly (MLA) from the then Thakazhy constituency after India's independence, was from Edathua. He defeated his friend and now famous novelist Thakazhy Shivashankarappilla in the election.

Edathua is the hometown of K. N. P. Kurup, who was also its panchayat president.

Edathua is the home town of the international swimmer Arjuna award winner Sebastian Xavier of Manammal family. It is also the home of Mathews Mar Theodosius, the Metropolitan of Idukki Diocese. Malankara Orthodox Church belongs to Kannammalil family Pandankary .

'Keralaassisi' Puthenparampil Thommachen, the founder of the Franciscan Third order in Kerala, is also from Edathua.

== Transportation ==
Distance from Edathua:

- Cochin International airport - 109 km
- Trivandrum International airport-128 km
- Ambalappuzha railway station-13 km
- Thiruvalla railway station- 17 km

Kerala State Road Transport Corporation (KSRTC) operates bus service from Sub depot of Edathua. Kerala State Water Transport Department (SWTD) operates boat services from Edathua boat jetty.

SWTD Boat Services to/From Edathua *= Approximate Timing
Arrival	Departure	Service	Route
06:00*		Champakulam - Edathua	
	06:00	Edathua - Champakulam	
08:15*		Champakulam - Edathua	
09:00*		Venattukadu - Edathua	Nedumudy, Champakulam
	8:15	Edathua - Kochupally	Champakulam
	10:00	Edathua - Nedumudy	Champakulam
10:15*		Kochupally - Edathua	Champakulam
	11:40	Edathua - Champakulam	
13:00*		Nedumudy - Edathua	Champakulam
	13:15	Edathua - Nedumudy	Champakulam
14:00*		Champakulam - Edathua	
	14:45	Edathua - Veliapally	Champakulam
16:15*		Nedumudy - Edathua	Champakulam
	16:15	Edathua - Nedumudy	Champakulam
17:30*		Veliapally - Edathua	Champakulam
	17:30	Edathua - Nedumudy	Champakulam
19:15*		Nedumudy - Edathua	Champakulam
	19:15	Edathua - Champakulam	
20:45*		Nedumudy - Edathua	Champakulam
	21:00	Edathua - Champakulam	
