= St. Thomas Church, Thumpoly =

- Thumpolypally (തുമ്പോളിപ്പള്ളി)
- സെൻ്റ് തോമസ് ചർച്ച് തുമ്പോളി
- St. Thomas Church, Thumpoly
- Location: Thumpoly, in the town of Alappuzha (Alleppey), in Alappuzha district, state of Kerala
- Country: India
- Denomination: Catholic

History
- Founded: 1600

Architecture
- Style: Indo-Portuguese
- Years built: 1624–1730

Administration
- Diocese: Alleppey

Clergy
- Bishop: James Raphael Anaparambil

St. Thomas Church, Thumpoly (also known as Thumpolypally) in Kerala, India, is a Catholic pilgrimage church named after Saint Thomas the Apostle, and dedicated to the Immaculate Conception of the mother of Jesus. It is located in the Ambalappuzha taluk of Alappuzha district within the Roman Catholic Diocese of Alleppey. Its parish is one of the largest in the diocese and in the state of Kerala. It is a major church of the South India region and, due to the historical and cultural importance of its traditions, has been put forward to be considered for Minor Basilica status. If bestowed, this would make St. Thomas Church at Thumpoly the 35th such basilica in India.

A prominent Marian pilgrimage shrine, with a tradition of faith that is more than five centuries old, St Thomas Church has made Thumpoly (also transliterated Thumboli) a Christian pilgrimage center in Kerala. It is included in the pilgrimage tourism of Kerala State by the state government. The historical feast of Thumpolyperunnal, the Immaculate Conception of the Thumpoly Mata ('Thumpoly Mother'), is celebrated from the church over nineteen days in November and December every year. People of different castes and religions make pilgrimages to it.

Mar Thoma Christians settled at Thumpoly in the 6th century; they first established a small church built of thatching. Together with the building of the associated Muthappan Cross in AD 820, this established Christian observance and pilgrimage at Thumpoly, a tradition that has been ongoing for over 1200 years. Thumpolypally is the site of the first statue of Mary, mother of Jesus (enshrined c. 1580), to be venerated in India by local communities. A feast day commemorating the statue's arrival by ship was inaugurated in 1599. Construction of the current church, in stone and wood, began in 1600 and was finally completed in 1730. To mark the 300 years of continuous use of the church building since its completion, a Jubilee Year celebration is due to be held in the year 2030, some 430 years after the current church's foundation.

== History ==
From the 6th century AD, a small community of Christians settled in Thumpoly, beginning the Christian tradition there. A small church, known as Thomaa Pally, was established. In AD 820, the bishops of Syria, Mar Sabor and Mar Proth, on their way from Manakodam to Kollam, visited Thumpoly, where they had the Muthappan Kurish ('Muthappan Cross') erected. The current St. Thomas Church is on the site of the first church, a small building of turf and thatch. The foundation year of the current church was 1600, with construction of the stone building completed in 1730.

St Thomas Church at Thumpoly was the first in India at that time to have enshrined a statue of the mother of Jesus and to follow attendant rituals of veneration. This statue of the Virgin Mary, the "mother who came by ship", arrived on Thumpoly shores sometime between 1550 and 1600. Known as the Thumpoly Matha ('Thumpoly mother'), it is also called the Kappalottakaari Amma or 'mother of sailors'. The historic Confraternity Feast of the Immaculate Conception celebrates these events.

In 1585, Giacomo Fenicio, an Italian-born Jesuit priest and an early Classical Indologist, established a confraternity, the Christian Confraternity Community for Darshan ('visionary' or 'philosophy') (Note: In Indian religions darshan is a visionary; it refers to the experience of seeing, or being in the presence of, sacred entities. By extension, in Indian philosophy the word is related to philosophical enquiry, describing the contemplation of profound ideas.) in Thumboli, known today as Kombreria Darshan Samuh. He also provided other assistance to Thumboli.

The church has been included in the list of places of pilgrimage for the purpose of declaring it a Minor Basilica, considering its age, tradition, heritage, historical importance, and other unique features.

=== Construction ===
There was only a small church in Thumpoly for centuries. Between 1500 and 1700, efforts were made to build a larger church at Thumpoly. All these were attacked in war, destroyed by fire, encountered financial difficulties, and so on; this delayed establishment of a larger church. Finally, in 1700, the grand church of today was built.

The construction of the stone church was started in 1600, with the permission of the veera kerala varma king of Cochin. The king visited the site to view its progress; he sponsored the construction and dedicated valuable gold ornaments to the Mother of Thumpoli. Various obstacles halted the work, however. Construction recommenced in 1624 and after 1700 the building work accelerated. Construction of the present church was completed in 1730. The King of Cochin was present at the dedication. The church was constructed using a surkhi mixture of lime and varal paste.

The church was renovated in 2009. The renovation was completed without the church losing its uniqueness and heritage through re-plastering.

== Interior and façade ==
The church and its interior are beautifully crafted with impressive carvings and architecture. The main altar (madbhaa) is beautifully carved; it has a unique pattern of leaf and uses five different colors of leaf juice and fruit juice. It was hand-carved centuries ago from a single piece of wood and is mounted on five pillars. There are six smaller sub-altars. The life-like crucifixion of Jesus Christ on the statue is very large and beautiful.

The round stone in front of the church is larger than those of other churches; it is very rare to see such round stones. The façade of the church is very beautiful and attractive. During the renovation, the interior of the church, including the façade, was re-plastered. The church is also under the protection of the Archaeological Department.

== Pious legend and traditions ==
Between 1550 and 1600, a ship sailing from Paris and Italy across the Arabian Sea lost control when the wind and waves were strong. The ship's captain prayed to the statue of Mary the mother of Jesus that was kept in a special compartment of the ship. The sea and the weather calmed, and the ship came to rest on the shore of Thumpoli. The captain, inspired by the vision, gave the statue to be venerated in the Thumpoli church. Thus, for the first time in India, a statue of the Mother of God was venerated with religious rituals in Thumpoli. This can be said based on historical facts. The Thumpoli Mother is called the Kappalottakkari Amma and the "Mother of Sailors" because the Thumpoli Mother came there by ship. This is behind the fame of the Thumpoly pilgrimage center.

There is another large statue of the Mother of Thumboli on the cross near the coastal road behind the church. The devout profess to seeing apparitions and changes in appearance in the statues.

The king of Moothedath sued for peace after praying to the statue of the mother Mary to end the war. He issued a peace treaty which was accepted by the kings of Cochin and of Iladathu. As a result, in 1607, the king dedicated the 'Salve Roop' of the Mother, made from a single elephant's tusk to the Mother of Thumpoli. Even today, on festive days, the 'Salve Litany' (Ladinjunum) is performed along with the festive procession of the sacred statue of the Mother.

Another legend is that during construction of the church, two thieves tried to steal the sacred statue of the Mother of Thumpoly and ornaments in the middle of the night. They took the statue and when they reached the front of the church as far as the elephant gate, the statue became so heavy they could not raise it or even move a step. So one of the thieves, feeling angry, pinched the Mother's right cheek. At that, the bells of the church started ringing by themselves. Realizing the trouble they were facing, they tried to run and hide, but as if they were in a delusion, they kept running around the church several times. The locals, alerted by the noise, came running. The thieves left without their booty but, ever since, local lore has it, it is possible to see the wound that was caused to the Mother's cheek by the pinch given on that day, in the light red color on it.

In 1680, the Thumpoli Church was last hit by fire. A lamp that was lit in the church fell over and the church caught fire and was destroyed. However, the people saw that the statue of the Thumpoli Mother was safe and secure without being exposed to the flames. This is believed to be a great miracle.

A traditional story tells that once, some large stones were required for the construction of the meda in Thumbolipalli. At that time, the construction of the Alappuzha lighthouse was going on. Then, knowing this, some people of Thumboli presented the matter to the architect of the lighthouse, Mr. Hucrafords, to help by giving some stones. But he said that he could not give the stones, or even if he did, how would you take it from here? Those huge stones They are pulled by elephants. He said that they will not let the elephants here carry the stones for you. Then how will you carry this from here? How can your mother, your mother, carry this, and not only that, but does your mother have tusks and trunks to pull it with? He mocked them by saying. Thus, the people who were disappointed returned from there. But that night, while Hukraford was sleeping, he dreamed many times that an elephant was coming to kill him and that the elephant's tusks and trunk were seen. He woke up startled and could not sleep peacefully. When he asked what was the matter, his wife prayed to Mother Thumpoli and asked her for her well-being and asked him to deliver the stones to be given there as soon as possible in the next few days. Realizing his mistake, he prayed to Mother. Thus, in the very next few days, Hukraford also released the elephants there to transport those big stones there. In order to prevent the nightmare from recurring again and to atone for it, he offered a small statue of a tusked elephant, a kompanaana to the Mother. Even today, believers pray to the Mother by touching the statue of the tusked elephant to be rid of nightmares. This small elephant image can only be seen on feast days. The statue of the Mother is kept below, near the nest. Other objects like ropes and canoes, which are said to have different meanings, are also left as votive offerings.

== Church festivals ==
The Annual Confraternity feast of Our Lady Of Immaculate Conception at St Thomas Church is a very historical and famous festival. Darshana Thirunal or "Kombria Perunnal" confraternity feast of the Amalolbhava Matha (Immaculate Conception) is celebrated every year from 27 November to 15 December at Thumpoly church. Until a century and a half ago, the month of August was celebrated as the feast of the Assumption of Mary in Thumpoly Church. Except for the change in the date and month, the traditional customs and feast ceremonies continue as before.

The feast of Our Lady of Immaculate Conception at St Thomas, Thumpoly is a perunnal ('feast day' or 'festival') celebration that lasts for 18 days. Every year from 6 to 15 December and on the main days of the festival, the church and the route from the church premises to the beach are decorated with lamps and lights; many people come to see and enjoy it. Important offerings (nercha) are the pattum (silk) kireedavum (crown), saree samarpan, amongst many other votives and offerings. Another special feature of the feast is the salve ledinj or litini and the statue of the mother used for it (an elephant-horn salve statue dedicated by King Muthetada in 1607), is a part of this special tirukarma along with Karmikan.

The devotional experience of worshiping the divine form of the Mother of God with flowers, perfumes and incense is unique to the festival days. The perunnal flag is hoisted every year on 28 November. All devotees hold lighted candles while hoisting the flag. People come from far and wide to see it. The main festival day is 8 December. The perunnal Predakshinam (Feast Procession), which carries the historical Statue of Mother Mary, which is taken out only once a year, takes about two hours to return and re-enter the church.

Ettaammidam perunnal day is on 15 December. Opening of Thiruswaroopa Thirunada Thurakkal of Mother of Thumpoly Matha is on 6 December. On the day of the procession, the statue of the Mother Mary is brought down from the main altar for public veneration, the miraculous statue of the Mother is dressed in fine golden silk, and then the Mother Mary is adorned with sacred ornaments. Among these sacred ornaments, there are valuable ornaments presented by the King of Kochi in the 16th century. The statue is beautifully ornamented, like a queen, and is opened to the people for public worship and the Thirumukha darshan is performed. The St Thomas Church festival ends at midnight on 15 December.

=== Highlights ===
- The Thirunal Predakshinam, a feast-day festival procession at the Ettamidam, is led by women.
- Officially begun in 1599, the 19-day long festival celebration, Thumpoly Perunnal, takes place from 27 November to 15 December; it is one of the largest Marian festivals in India.
- The 'Salve Roop' used in the Salve litany was donated by King Moothedathu in 1607 and is still preserved today. This form can only be seen on feast days.

== Other feast days ==
The feast of the parish patron, Saint Thomas the Apostle (Thoma sleeha) and Saint Peter the Apostle (Patros sleeha) are celebrated on the Sunday after 3 July (first or second week of July). The Feast of the Nativity of Mary (Ettu Nombu Thirunnal) is celebrated from 1–8 September. Every year from 1 to 31 October the month of the Rosary (Kontha Namaskaram) is celebrated. This is one of the biggest Marian festivals (feasts) for a pilgrimage Church seen in Kerala and Alappuzha district.

== Location and access ==
Thumpoly is at the following distances from the locations listed below:

- Alappuzha city – 6 km (3.7 mi)
- Changanassery – 34 km (21 mi)
- Cherthala – 20 km (12 mi)
- Kayamkulam – 52 km (32 mi)
- Kochi-Cochin City – 60 km (37 mi)
- Kochi International Airport – 80 km (50 mi)
- Kuttanadu – 25 km (16 mi)

The nearest railway station is the Thumpoly Railway Station and the next closest is Alappuzha Railway Station. The nearest KSRTC depot or stand is the Alappuzha KSRTC Stand.

St Thomas Church is open from 5:30 am to 8:00 pm every day. On festival days like Thirunal, the church will be closed only after 10:30 pm (unless it is busy). The church is not usually closed on important feast days – or, if it is closed, the Thirunada will close only after 12:30 am or half-night 1:00 am.
