= Pontifical Urban University =

Pontifical university

- Pontificia Università Urbaniana
- Latin: Pontificia Universitas Urbaniana (PUU)
- Motto: Euntes docete (Matthew 28:19)
- Motto in English: Go and teach
- Type: Pontifical university
- Established: 1 August 1627 (399 years ago)
- Affiliations: Catholic (Congregation for the Evangelization of Peoples)
- Chancellor: Luis Antonio Tagle
- Rector: P. Leonardo Sileo, OFM
- Location: Via Urbano VIII, 16; Rome, Italy; 41°53′58″N 12°27′35″E
- Website: www.urbaniana.va/it.html

The Pontifical Urban University, also called the Urbaniana after its names in both Latin and Italian, (Note: Latin: Pontificia Universitas Urbaniana; Italian: Pontificia Università Urbaniana.) is a pontifical university that was under the authority of the Congregation for the Evangelization of Peoples. The university's mission is to train students for service as missionaries. Its campus is located on the Janiculum Hill in Rome, on extraterritorial property of the Holy See. It was formerly known as the Urban College, or Collegium Urbanum.

== History ==
From its beginnings, the Urbaniana had missionary character to serve the Catholic Church through the formation of missionaries and experts in the area of Missiology or other disciplines, necessary in the evangelizational activity of the Church.

The origins of the university date back to Pope Urban VIII who decided to establish a new college with his papal bull Immortalis Dei Filius of August 1, 1627. Pope Urban saw, at the urging of Juan Bautista Vives, a Spanish prelate, that it was necessary to establish a central seminary for the missions where young priests could be educated, both for countries which had no national college, but also those that did. A central international college would allow priests to make acquaintances and form mutually helpful relationships in other countries. The new college was called the Collegium Urbanum from the name of its founder and placed under the immediate direction of the Congregation of Propaganda (now called the Congregation for the Evangelization of Peoples).

After the College's founding, Juan Bautista Vives donated a suitable building near the Piazza di Spagna. Under Pope Alexander VII, the Church of the Three Magi was added to the building. Vives established six free scholarships, to which were later added endowments by other pontiffs and prelates, especially Innocent XII, Clement XII, and the brother of Urban VIII, Cardinal Antonio Barberini.

In 1798, following the disruption surrounding the creation of the Roman Republic and the Napoleonic Wars, the college was closed and some of the students were received by the Lazarists at Montecitorio. This arrangement lasted until 1809, when even this last remnant of the college was suppressed. In 1814, however, some of the Propaganda students were again received by the Lazarists, and in 1817 the Urbaniana was reopened. From 1836 until 1848, it operated under the direction of the Jesuits.

At the beginning of the twentieth century, the Urban College was still housed in the Palazzo di Propaganda Fide in Piazza di Spagna. At that time, the average number of its resident students was about one hundred and ten. Those resident students were necessarily from countries that fell under the responsibility of the Propaganda. Then as now, however, the Urbaniana operates its own schools, which are attended by other students not subject to the Congregation for the Evangelization of Peoples. In fact, since 1966, the Urbaniana has accepted the affiliation of seminaries and institutes of philosophy, theology, missiology, and canon law from all over the world. The total number of students educated under the auspices of the Urbanianum was about five hundred in 1910.

In 1926, the College moved from its historic home in the Piazza di Spagna to its current campus on the Janiculum, overlooking Saint Peter's Square. Its first home there was a relatively modest building, but it is now housed in a much-expanded group of buildings.

The university was endowed with the title "pontifical" with the motu proprio Fidei propagandae of Pope John XXIII on October 1, 1962.

In 2021, Sister Pietra Luana (Etra) Modica, a Scalabrinian nun, was appointed as Secretary General of the university. She is the first woman to hold the post since the organisation was founded.

=== Traditions ===
In the seventeenth century, Alexander VII instituted a tradition of having all the students make an oath, binding them to remain under the jurisdiction of the Propaganda, not to enter a religious order without special permission, and to return after ordination to the priesthood to their dioceses or provinces to engage in the sacred ministry, and to send each year if in Europe, or every second year otherwise, a report of their apostolic work. By the early 1900s, this practice was still done: every graduate student (alumno), wherever he may have been in the pursuit of his ministry, was bound to write a letter to the cardinal prefect every year, to let him know how his work was progressing and how he was faring. Catholic Encyclopedia reports that cardinal used to answer immediately with "a letter of paternal encouragement and counsel."

In the early twentieth century, it used to be customary for the Urban College to hold an annual solemn "Accademia Polyglotta" at Epiphany, to symbolize the worldwide unity of the Catholic Church. At this event, the Propaganda students would recite poems in their respective mother tongues.

== Activity ==
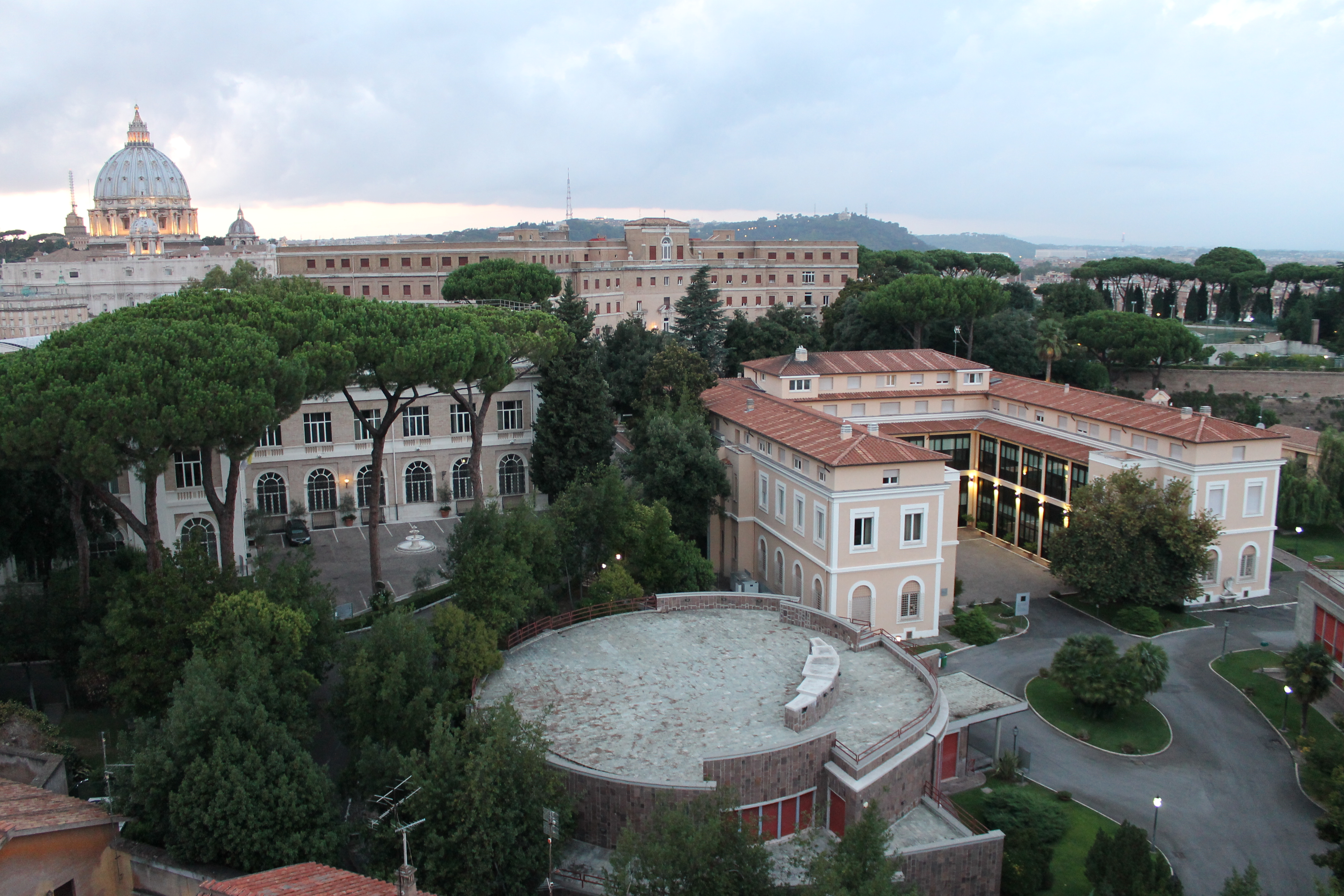
A view of the campus of the Urban University from the south

=== Faculties ===
The university, which is located on the Janiculum Hill in Rome, has four faculties: the faculty of theology, the faculty of philosophy, the faculty of canon law, and the faculty of missiology. The faculties of theology and philosophy are as old as the institution itself, while the canon law and missiology faculties are more recent. The Missionary Institute was founded on September 1, 1933, and split into the two faculties of canon law and missiology on July 25, 1986.

=== Library ===
The current library of the Urbaniana was formed from two pre-existing collections: the historic Urban College Library and the Pontifical Missionary Library, which were joined in 1979. Today the combined library contains about 350,000 volumes, including over 9,000 directly accessible in reading rooms; 800 current journals and about 4,000 archival; about 50,000 microfiches; and documents from various specialized archives. In the library there are about 1500 late-Medieval incunabula, a collection of rare atlases, geographical maps printed in the sixteenth century, and missionary catechisms from the sixteenth century onwards. The library is particularly notable for its Chinese collections and Old and New Testament resources.

=== University press ===
The Urban University Press handles publishing for both the university and the Congregation for the Evangelization of Peoples. Although it currently operates in line with the criteria of modern university publishing, it derives from a tradition that goes back to the very origins of the Urban College and the Printing House of the Congregation of Propaganda Fide. Currently the UUP publishes the following periodicals: Euntes Docete, the scientific journal of the university, Ius Missionale, the yearbook of the Faculty of Canon Law, and Bibliographia Missionaria, a journal curated by the director of the Library. In addition to these, every year the press also prints the university Annales, which serves to review and record the academic and non-academic life of the university and its faculty.

=== Administration ===
While the university is owned and operated by the Congregation for the Evangelization of Peoples, whose prefect is Chancellor of the university ex officio, as a center of higher education it is regulated by the Congregation for Catholic Education. Cardinal Luis Antonio Tagle, as current Prefect of the Congregation for the Evangelization of Peoples, serves as the Chancellor; the Vice Chancellor is Archbishop Protase Rugambwa, Secretary of the same Congregation.

In its early days, the rector of the university was a Theatine and would serve as the parish priest of those who lived in the Palazzo di Propaganda Fide. For centuries, however, the rector was a secular prelate. As of 2015, the Rector Magnificus of the Urbaniana is Alberto Trevisiol, a priest of the order of Consolata Missionaries.

== Former faculty ==
- Servant of God Cyril Bernard Papali

== Alumni ==
=== American ===
- Cardinal John Carberry (Archbishop of St. Louis)
- Cardinal Dennis Joseph Dougherty (Archbishop of Philadelphia)
- Cardinal Francis George (Archbishop Emeritus of Chicago)
- Cardinal Edmund Szoka (Archbishop of Detroit)
- William Augustine Williams (first openly African-American Catholic seminarian)
- Venerable Fr Augustus Tolton (first openly African-America priest)
- Archbishop William Henry Elder (Bishop of Natchez and later Archbishop of Cincinnati)

=== African ===
- Cardinal Francis Arinze (Prefect of the Congregation for Divine Worship and the Discipline of the Sacraments)
- Cardinal Bernard Agré (Archbishop of Abidjan)
- Cardinal Laurent Monsengwo Pasinya (Archbishop of Kinshasa)
- Emmanuel Wamala (Archbishop of Kampala)

=== Eastern European ===
- Cardinal Iuliu Hossu, Bishop of Cluj-Gherla in the Romanian Greek Catholic Church
- Cardinal Lubomyr Husar, Major Archbishop of Kiev-Galicia in the Ukrainian Greek Catholic Church

=== Asian ===
- Mar Kariattil Iousep (Former Metropolitan Archbishop of Kodungallūr)
- Cardinal Emmanuel III Delly (Patriarch of Babylon of the Chaldeans)
- Cardinal Oswald Gracias (Archbishop of Bombay)
- Cardinal Nicolas Cheong Jin-suk (Archbishop of Seoul)
- Cardinal Duraisamy Simon Lourdusamy (Prefect of the Congregation for the Oriental Churches)
- Cardinal Michael Michai Kitbunchu (Archbishop of Bangkok)
- Cardinal Malcolm Ranjith (Archbishop of Colombo)
- Cardinal Ignatius Suharyo Hardjoatmodjo (Archbishop of Jakarta, and Military Ordinariate of Indonesia)
- Cardinal John Tong Hon (Bishop Emeritus of Hong Kong)
- Cardinal William Goh (Archbishop of Singapore)
- Archbishop Joseph Nguyễn Năng (Archbishop of Ho Chi Minh)
- Bishop James Raphael Anaparambil (Bishop of Diocese of Alleppey)
- Bishop Antony Kattiparambil ( Bishop of Diocese of Cochin )

=== Martyrs ===
In addition to the many ecclesiastical dignitaries among the Urbaniana's past students there have also been four martyrs: the Belgian Jacques Foelech (1643); Pietro Cesy (1680); the Armenian Melchior Tasbas (1716), and Nicholas Boscovich (1731).
