= Michael Arattukulam =

Roman Catholic bishop (1910–1995)

His Excellency Servant of God Michael Arattukulam
- First Bishop of Alleppey
- Province: Kerala
- Diocese: Roman Catholic Diocese of Alleppey
- See: Roman Catholic Church
- Term ended: 28 April 1984 (retired)
- Successor: Peter M. Chenapparambil

Orders
- Ordination: 29 August 1937
- Consecration: 7 December 1952

Personal details
- Born: 17 April 1910 Arthunkal, Alleppey, British India (present-day Kerala, India)
- Died: 20 March 1995 (aged 84)
- Buried: Mount Carmel Cathedral, Alleppey
- Denomination: Catholic Church
- Education: Mangalapuzha Seminary

Michael Arattukulam (17 April 1910 – 20 March 1995) was the first bishop of the Roman Catholic Diocese of Alleppey and an advocate of the Rotae Romanae.

== Career ==
The Roman Catholic Diocese of Alleppey belongs to the Latin rite and was created on 19 June 1952 by the division of the Roman Catholic Diocese of Cochin. Arattukulam was consecrated as the Bishop of Alleppey on 7 December 1952. Arattukulam participated in the four sessions in the Second Ecumenical Council of Vatican held at St. Peter's Basilica, Rome, from 1962 to 1965.

He was the first bishop to publicly criticize the "Indianization" of the Catholic Church's liturgy, although some Catholic groups protested against the use of Hindu elements in the Mass.

Arattukulam identified the sanctity of Fernanda Riva's life and asked that her Cause for Canonisation be introduced.

== Foundations ==
- St. Michael's College, Cherthala
- Alleppey Diocesan Social Welfare Society
- St. Joseph's College for Women Alappuzha
- Credit Union
- Catholic Teacher's Guild of Diocese of Alleppey
- Corporate Management of Schools (Diocese of Alleppey)
- Suviseshabhavan, Catechetical Commission, Diocese of Alleppey

== Works ==
- Latin Catholics of Kerala
- A study of the Inter Rites and Inter-Rite Conflicts in the Varapoly Seminary
- St. Francis Xavier on the Malabar Coast (1968)
