= Pandankary =

Village in Alappuzha District, Kerala, India

Coordinates: 9.37275°N 76.48456°E

Pandankary is a hamlet in Edathua Panchayat, Kuttanadu Taluk, Alapuzha (Alleppey) District, Kerala, India. Being a water-logged area (below sea-level), Pandankary people have to brace the flooding during monsoon season, which happens at least once a year. People from the area have migrated to many parts of the world, just like a typical Malayalee (those who speak Malayalam language).
