= St. Andrew's Basilica, Arthunkal =

- അർത്തുങ്കൽ പള്ളി
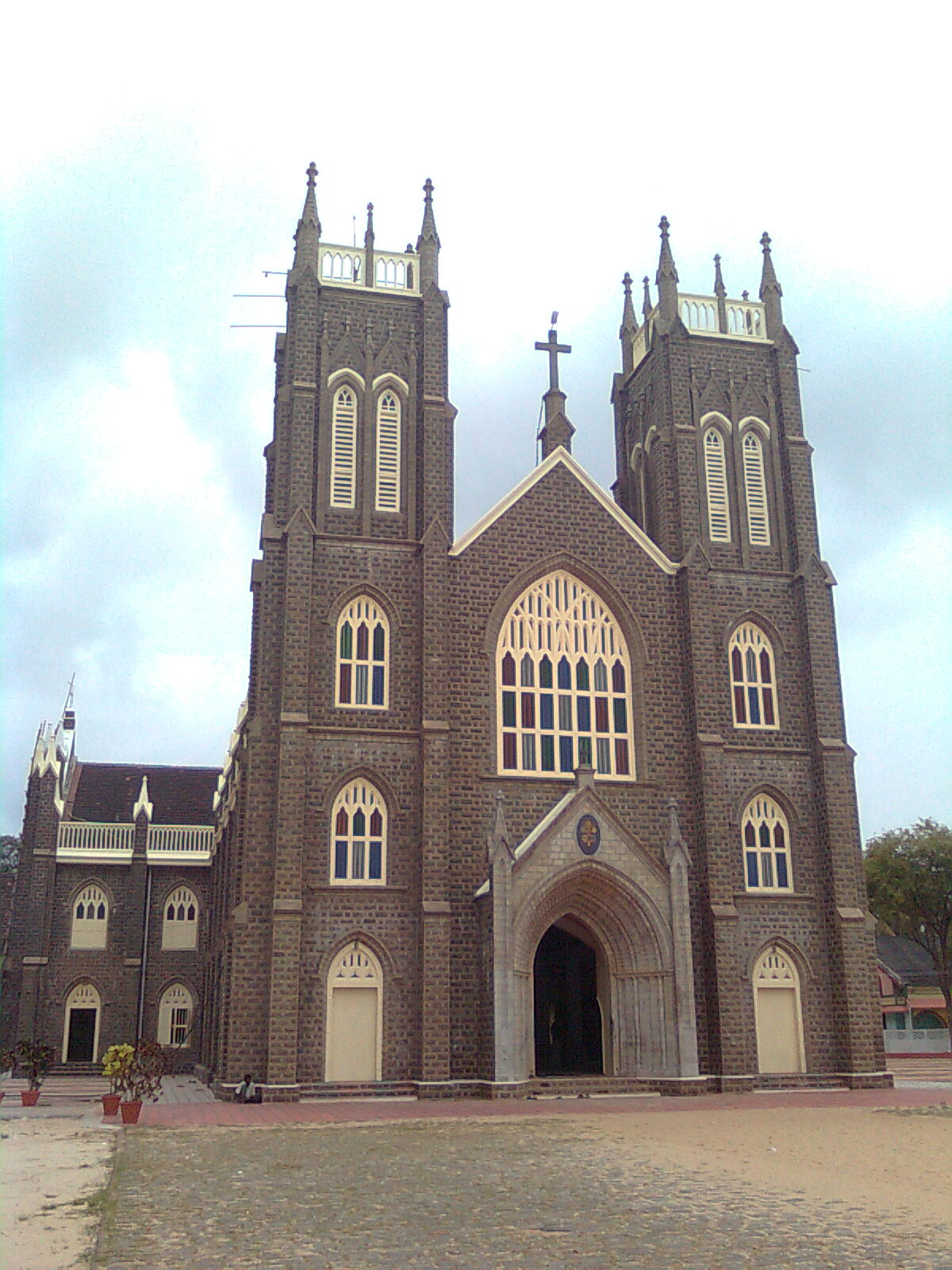
- Front view of the basilica

- Location in Kerala, India
- 9.6611°N 76.3004°E
- Location: Arthunkal, Kerala
- Country: India
- Denomination: Catholic Church
- Sui iuris church: Latin Church
- Website: www.arthunkalbasilica.com

History
- Status: Basilica
- Founded: 1584

Architecture
- Functional status: Active
- Designated: 9 July 2010
- Architectural type: Gothic architecture

Administration
- Diocese: Diocese of Alleppey

Clergy
- Bishop: James Raphael Anaparambil
- Rector: Fr. Yesudas Kattungalthayil

St. Andrew's Basilica, Arthunkal is a basilica located in the village of Arthunkal in Alappuzha, Kerala, India. It was constructed by Portuguese missionaries in the 16th century. The grand annual feast of St. Sebastian in January, which lasts for a month is attended by millions of pilgrims is one of the important celebrations and major attractions in the. The feast of the basilica is also known as "Makaram Perunnal". The church was rebuilt in 1584 under the vicar Jacomo Fenicio, an Italian Jesuit whose devotees claim to possess powers to heal the body and mind. Devotees fondly referred to him as "Arthunkal Veluthachan", "fair-skinned father". Fenicio died in 1632. Eight years after his death, the church was rebuilt again; this time, the church was reoriented to face west towards the long white-sand beach on the shores of the Arabian Sea. In 1647, a statue of St. Sebastian, struck with arrows all over his bleeding body (he was executed on the order of the Roman emperor Diocletian for embracing the Christian faith) sculptured in Milan, was brought and placed in the Arthunkal church.

On 9th July 2010, the church was elevated to the status of a basilica by Pope Benedict XVI, making it the first parish in the Diocese of Alleppey to receive this status.

== Gallery ==
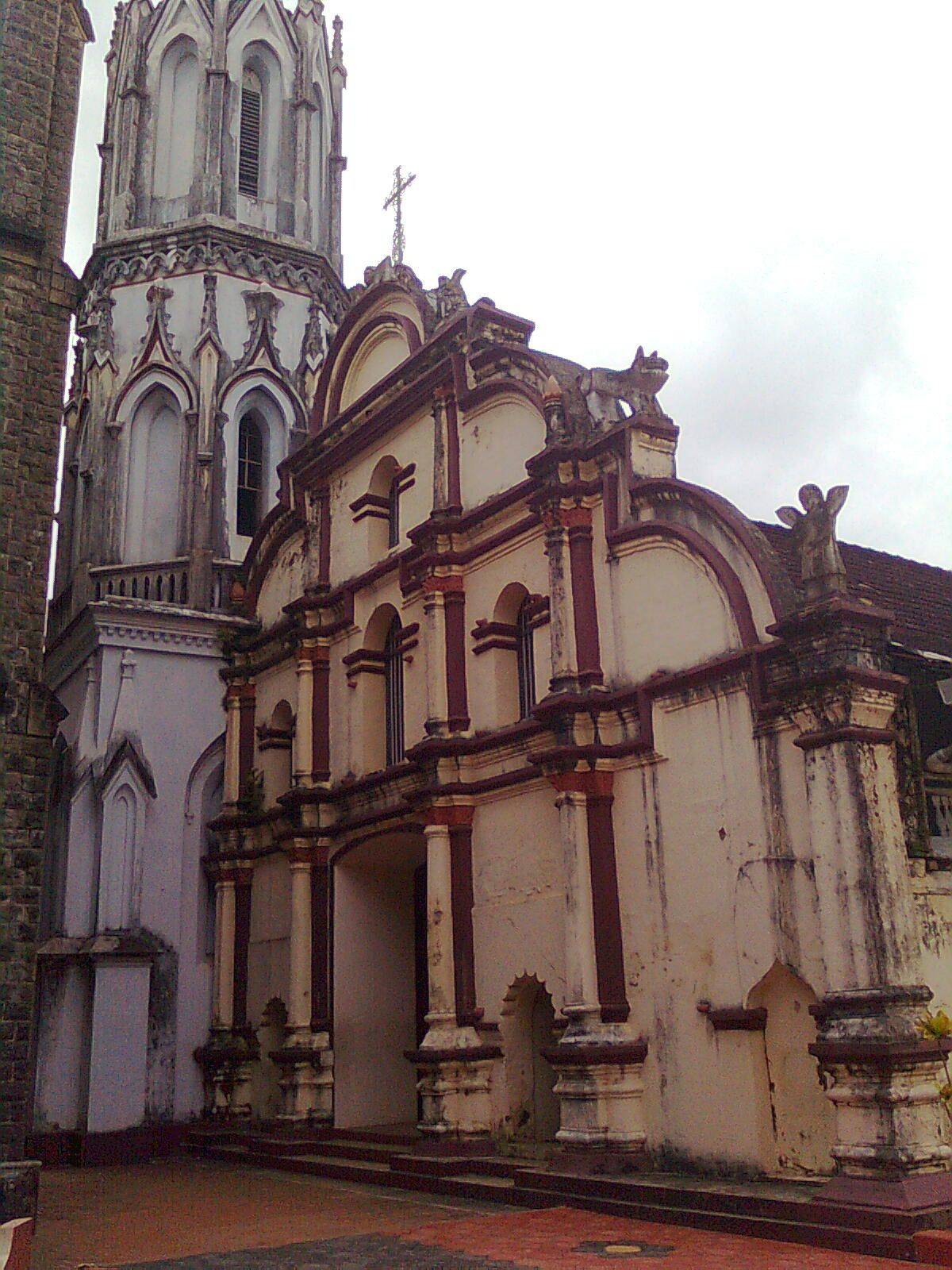
The old church behind the basilica

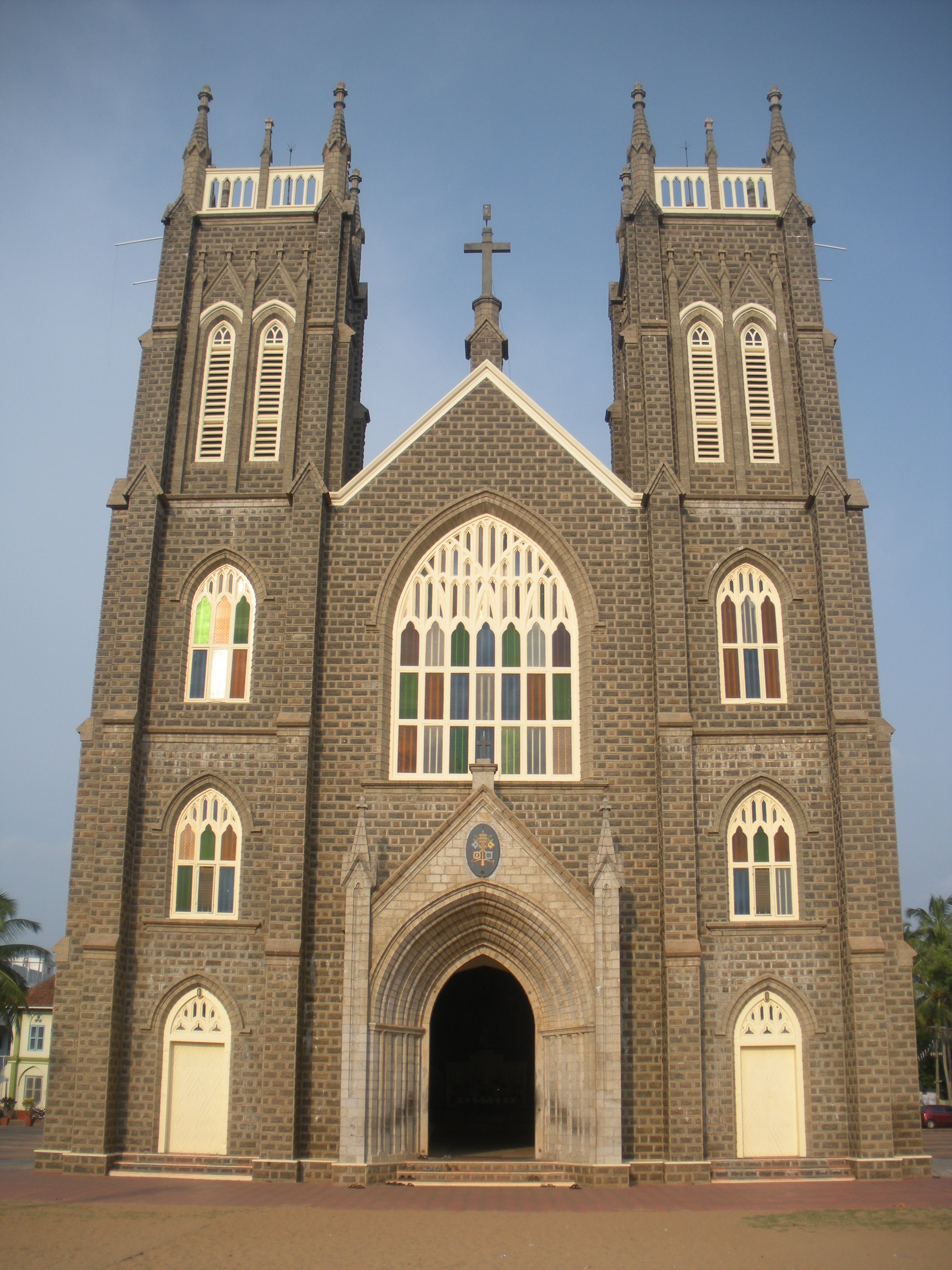
Front view of the basilica

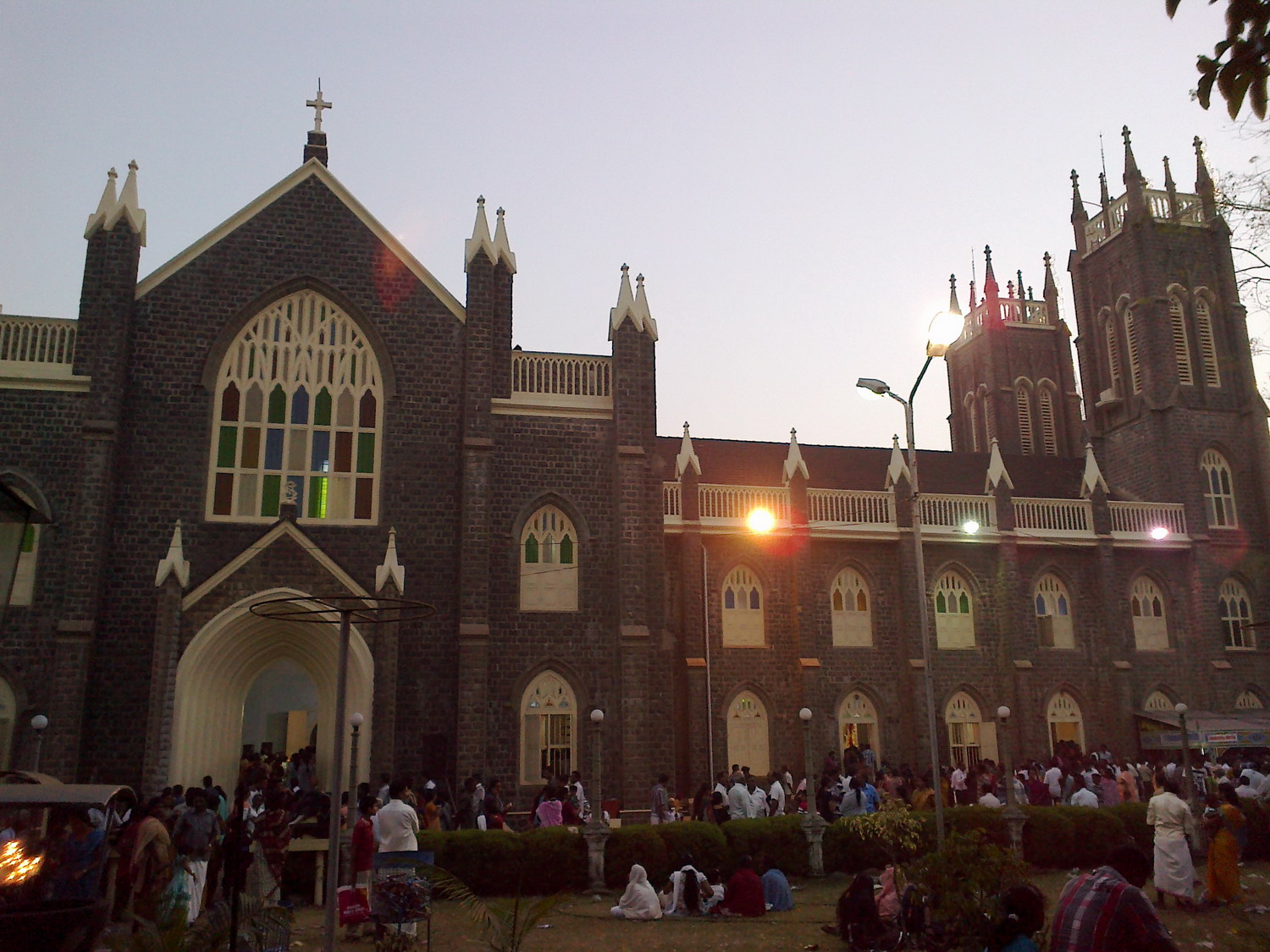
Side view of the basilica

== See also ==
- Arthunkal Veluthachan
