= Cyril Bernard Papali =

Indian priest and theologist

Servant of God Cyril Bernard Papali
- Church: Roman Catholic Church

Personal details
- Born: 26 August 1902 Kara, Cochin, Kerala, India
- Died: 14 August 1981 (aged 78) Rome, Italy
- Occupation: Catholic priest, theologian, writer, thinker, academic

Cyril Bernard Papali, OCD (1902–1981), in religion Cyril Bernard of the Mother of God, was an Indian Catholic priest, writer, academic and a peritus at the Second Vatican Council. Belonging to the Discalced Carmelites of the Manjummel province in Kerala, Papali was known for his scholarship in Christian and Indian theologies and wrote a number of books.

== Biography ==
Cyril Bernard Papali was born in Kara, in the south Indian state of Kerala on 26 September 1902. After opting the Third Order Discalced Carmelite (T.OCD) of the Archdiocese of Verapoly as the base of his vocation on 15 May 1924, he completed his vocational studies to be ordained as a priest on 30 May 1931. Eventually, he became the Prior General of the Congregation, a position he held until 1950, when he was called to Rome where he taught Hinduism at the Pontifical Urban University. He worked at the university till his retirement in 1972. In between, he was a Peritus at the Second Vatican Council on the question of laity which was in session from 1962 to 1965 and served as a Consultant of Vatican Secretariat for Non-Christians in 1964.

Papali wrote several books and articles in the fields of theology, philosophy and religion. His book, Hinduism: Religion and Philosophy is considered by many scholars as a classical work in Latin language written by an Indian. The Advaita Vedanta of Sankaracarya, a two-volume treatise on the Advaita philosophy of Adi Shankara is another of his known books on Hinduism. He has also written a book on Mary, mother of Jesus under the title, Mother of God: Mary in Scripture and tradition.

Papali died on 14 September 1981, aged 78 at the Pontifical Theological Faculty and Pontifical Institute of Spirituality Teresianum in Rome.

== Selected publications ==
- Papali (OCD), Cyril Bernard (1977). Hinduismus: Religion and Philosophy. Pontifical Institute of Theology and Philosophy.
- Papali (OCD), Cyril Bernard (1977). Vedic Religion; Philosophic Schools; From Vedism to Hinduism. Pontifical Institute of Theology and Philosophy.
- Papali (OCD), Cyril Bernard (1962). De apostolato laicorum (in Latin). Teresianum.
- Papali (OCD), Cyril Bernard (1949). Madonna ... Little Flower Press. p. 308. ASIN B0007KDPKK.
- Papali (OCD), Cyril Bernard (1964). The Advaita Vedanta of Cankaracarya. Teresianum.
- Papali (OCD), Cyril (1 January 1957). Mother of God: Mary in Scripture and tradition. Clonmore & Reynolds. p. 174. ASIN B0007KBWKA.
- Papali, Cyril B. Rev (1953). Mission prospect in India.
- Papali (OCD), Cyril Bernard (20 July 2011). "The Hindu Scriptures". 10. Concilium International Journal for Theology: 76–78. Archived from the original on 20 July 2011.
- Papali (OCD), Cyril Bernard (1968). "Hindu". 2. Concilium International Journal for Theology: 71–72.

== See also ==
- Roman Catholicism in India
- Saint Thomas Christians
- Alphonsa of the Immaculate Conception
- Antony Thachuparambil
