= Diocese of Alleppey =

Roman Catholic diocese in Kerala, India

Coordinates: 9.4965°N 76.3289°E

Diocese of Alleppey Diœcesis Alleppeyensis ആലപ്പുഴ രൂപത
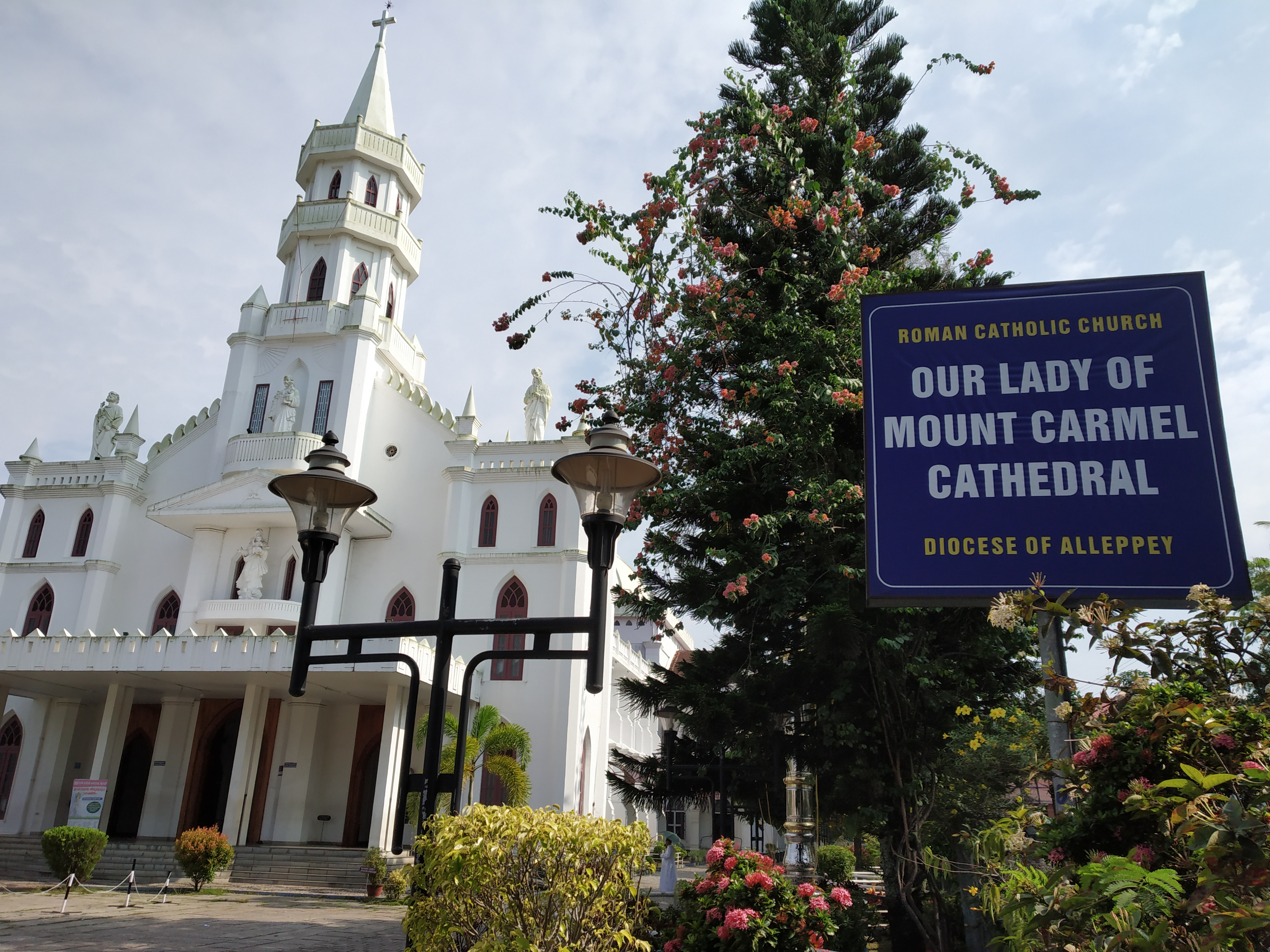
- Our Lady of Mount Carmel Cathedral, Alappuzha

Location
- Country: India
- Ecclesiastical province: Thiruvananthapuram
- Metropolitan: Thiruvananthapuram
- Headquarters: Bishop's House, Alappuzha

Statistics
- Area: 333 km^{2} (129 sq mi)
- Population: Total; Catholics: (as of 2015); 805,000; 163,076 (20.3%)
- Parishes: 66

Information
- Denomination: Catholic
- Sui iuris church: Latin Church
- Rite: Roman Rite
- Established: 19 June 1952; 74 years ago
- Archdiocese: Roman Catholic Archdiocese of Trivandrum
- Cathedral: Our Lady of Mount Carmel Cathedral, Alappuzha
- Patron saint: Our Lady of Mount Carmel; Saint Joseph
- Secular priests: 133

Current leadership
- Pope: Leo XIV
- Bishop: James Raphael Anaparambil
- Metropolitan Archbishop: Thomas J. Netto

Website
- dioceseofalleppey.com

The Diocese of Alleppey (Latin: Diœcesis Alleppeyensis) is the Latin Church diocese of the Catholic Church in the city of Alappuzha in the ecclesiastical province of Thiruvananthapuram in India. It lies along the Arabian Sea between the dioceses of Kochi and Kollam, covering an area of approx. 333 square kilometers.

The diocese was established from the Diocese of Cochin on June 19, 1952, by Pope Pius XII under the papal bull Ea Redemptoris Verba. The diocese is headed by Bishop James Raphael Anaparambil, who took charge in October 11, 2019. In addition to his role as bishop, he was appointed by Pope Francis on October 11, 2024, as the apostolic administrator sede plena of the Diocese of Cochin.

The episcopal see is the Bishop's House which is located near the Alappuzha Beach. The cathedral church of the diocese is the Our Lady of Mount Carmel Cathedral situated at Convent Square, Alappuzha. Arthunkal Basilica (Pilgrimage Shrine of Saint Sebastian) and Thumpoly Church (Marian Pilgrimage Shrine of the Mother of God) are the most significant pilgrimage shrine churches of the diocese.

== Institutions ==
St. Antony's Orphanage, founded by the Diocese of Alappuzha, is located opposite the Mount Carmel Cathedral, Alappuzha. More than ten thousands of alumni's are working in different parts of the world from this organization which was firmly established by Servant of God Reynolds Purackal and former Bishop Michael Arattukulam.

== List of bishops ==
- Michael Arattukulam (19 June 1952 – 28 April 1984)
- Peter Michael Chenaparampil (28 April 1984 – 9 December 2001)
- Stephen Athipozhiyil (9 December 2001 – 11 October 2019)
- James Raphael Anaparambil (11 October 2019 – present)

== Saints and causes for canonization ==
- Venerable Sr. Fernanda Riva
- Servant of God Sebastian Lawrence Casimir Presentation Valiyathayil
- Servant of God Reynolds Purackal

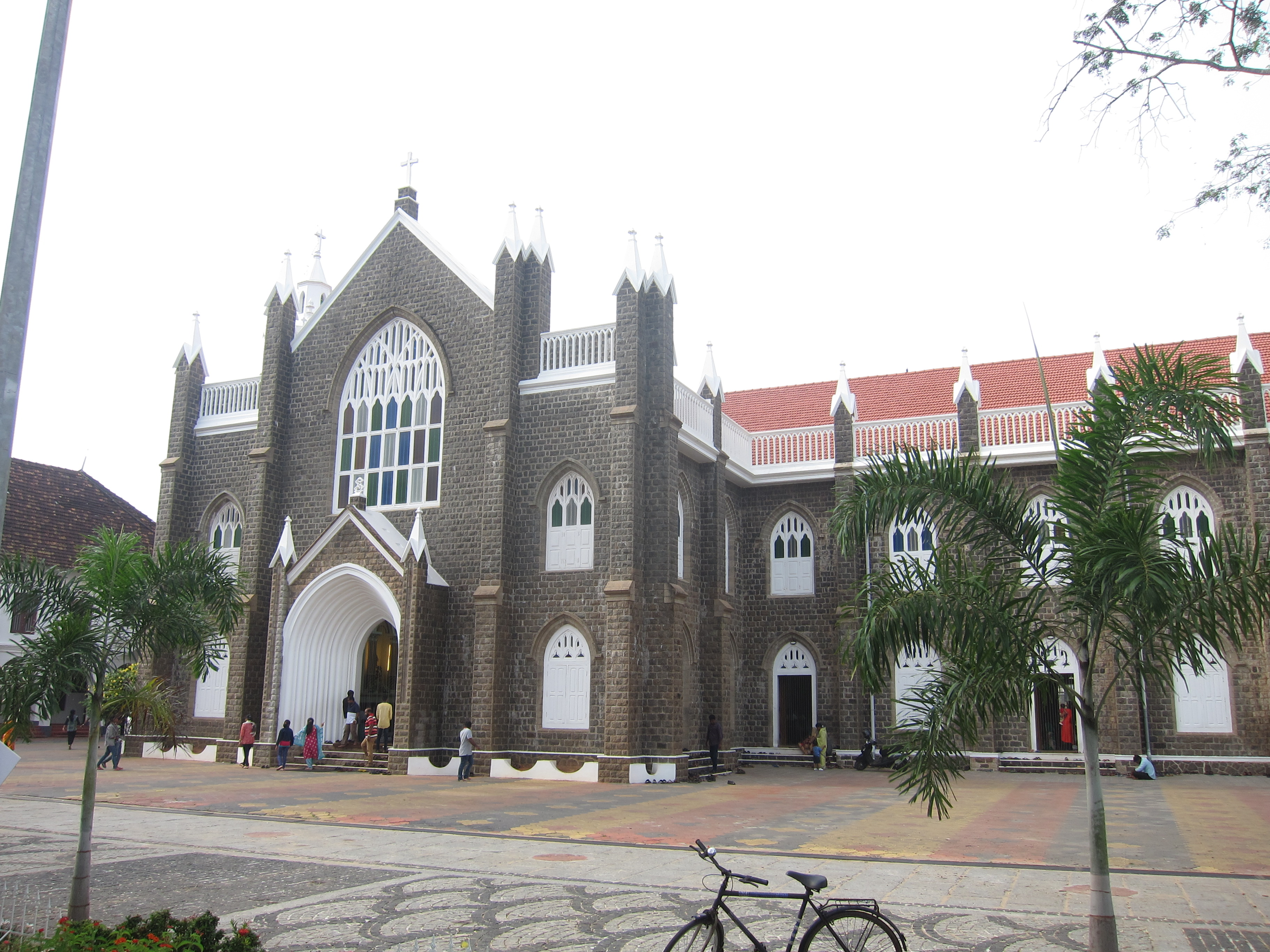
St. Andrew's Basilica, a major pilgrimage center under the Alappuzha Diocese and the largest shrine of St. Sebastian
