= Giacomo Fenicio =

Rev. Fr. Giacomo Fenicio (1558 - 1632), also known as Arthunkal Veluthachan, Jacomo Fenicio or Jacob Fenicio was an Italian Jesuit priest, scholar, theologian, and missionary in India.

He lived in South India as a priest and missionary from 1584 to 1632. He was one of the first Europeans who researched and authored scholastic literature about Hinduism. He was popular known among Christians of Kerala and known as Arthunkal Veluthachan or fair skinned father of Arthunkal.

Fenicio had significant interest in and knowledge of Hindu culture, and he studied the South Indian martial art of Kalaripayattu. Manu S. Pillai writes that Fenicio represented Portuguese colonial interests at the Hindu court in Calicut, where he converted the nephew of the rajah as part of an espionage plot.

== Personal life ==
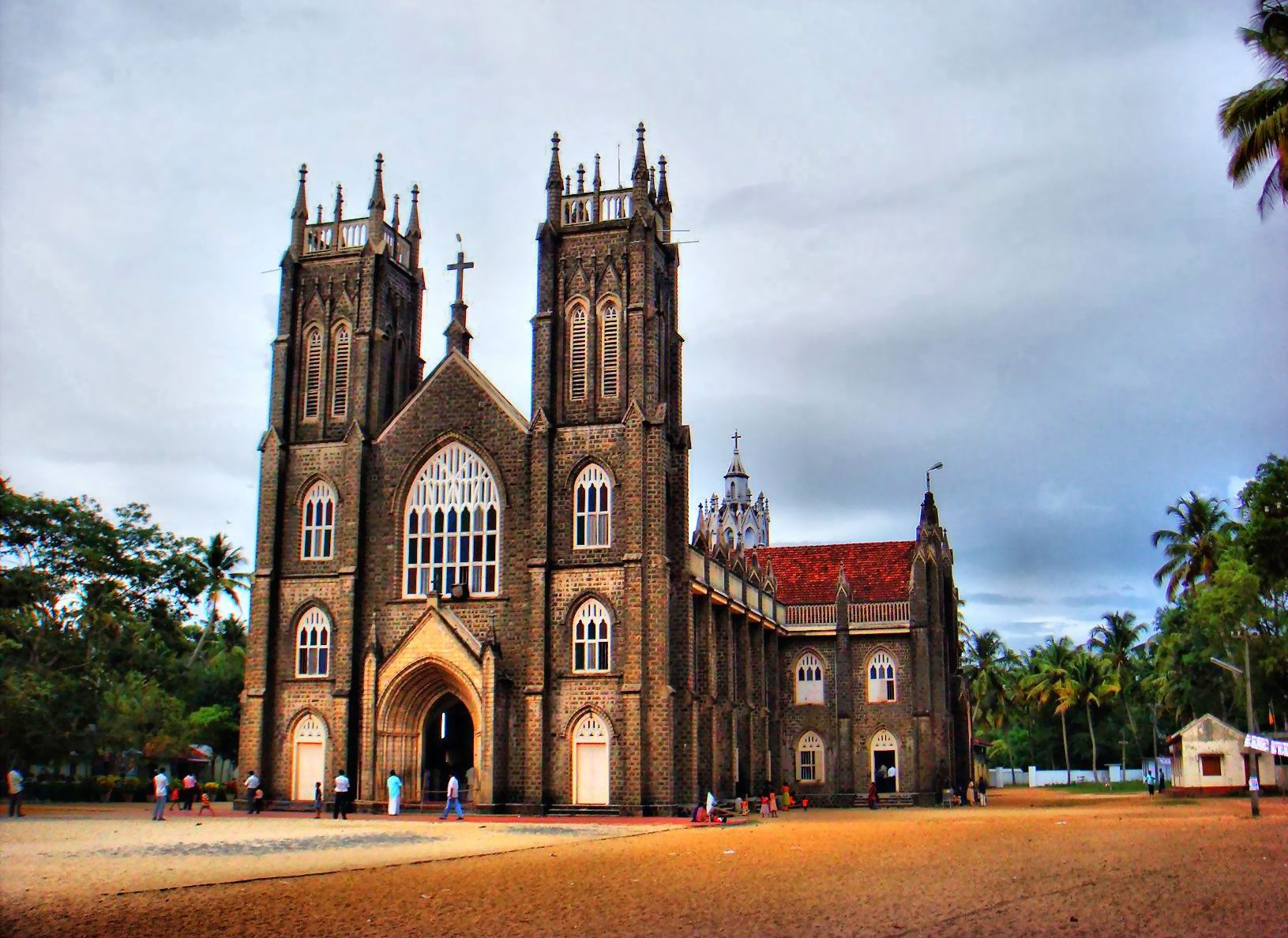
St. Andrew's Basilica, Arthunkal, Kerala

Fenicio was born in Capua, Italy in 1558. He arrived in India in 1582 and spent the next 48 years in South India. He became the second vicar of St. Andrew's Basilica, Arthunkal in Kerala after the death of the first vicar, Fr. Gasper Pius, who built the church. Fenicio was well-known for his tolerance towards other religions. One of the great things is the establishment of the confraternity-visionary community in the church in 1585. Fenicio died in Cochin in 1632.

== See also ==
- St. Andrew's Basilica, Arthunkal
