= James Raphael Anaparambil =

Indian Catholic prelate (born 1962)

Rt. Rev. Dr. J James Raphael Anaparambil
- Bishop of Alleppey
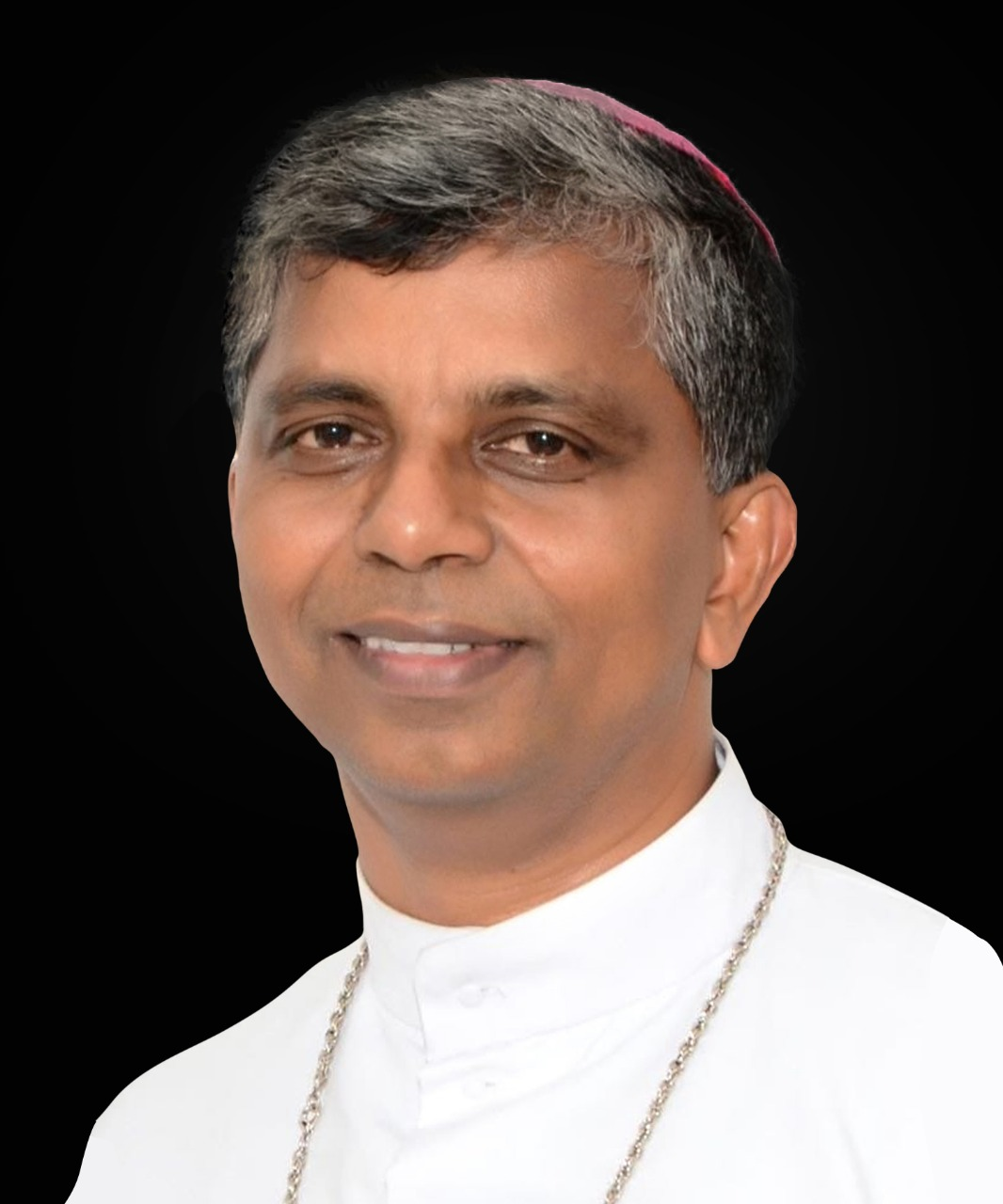
- Diocese: Roman Catholic Diocese of Alleppey
- Appointed: 7 December 2017
- Installed: 11 October 2019
- Predecessor: Stephen Athipozhiyil
- Previous post: Apostolic Administrator sede plena of the Diocese of Cochin 11 October 2024 to 07 December 2025

Orders
- Ordination: 11 February 2018
- Rank: Bishop

Personal details
- Born: James Raphael Anaparambil; 7 March 1962 (age 64) Chellanam, Kochi
- Denomination: Catholic
- Education: Pontifical Urban University
- Motto: "Da pacem Domine in diebus nostris"
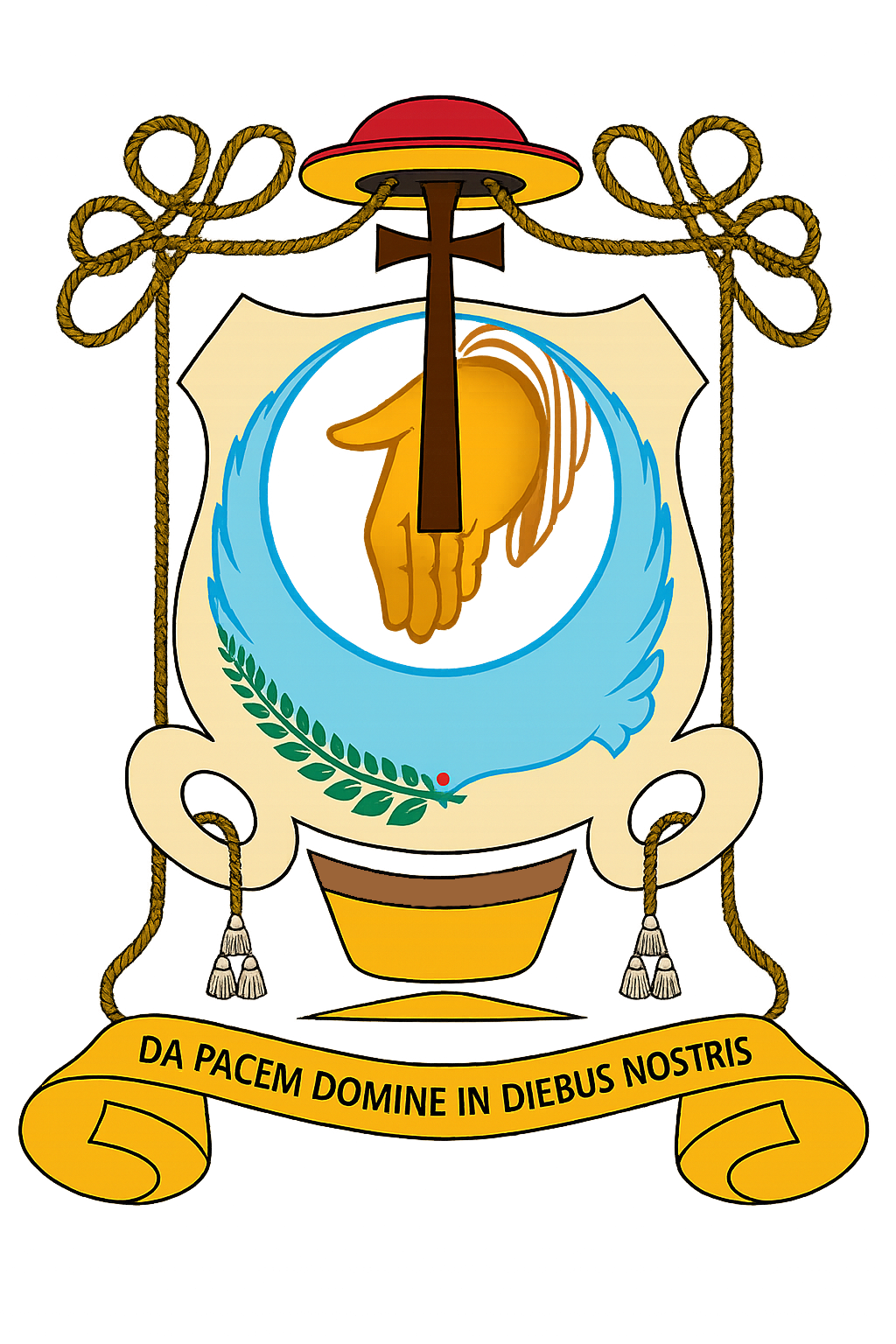
- Coat of arms

James Raphael Anaparambil (born 7 March 1962) is an Indian prelate serving as the fourth bishop of the Roman Catholic Diocese of Alleppey and the Apostolic Administrator sede plena of the Roman Catholic Diocese of Cochin.

== Biography ==
Styles of James Raphael Anaparambil
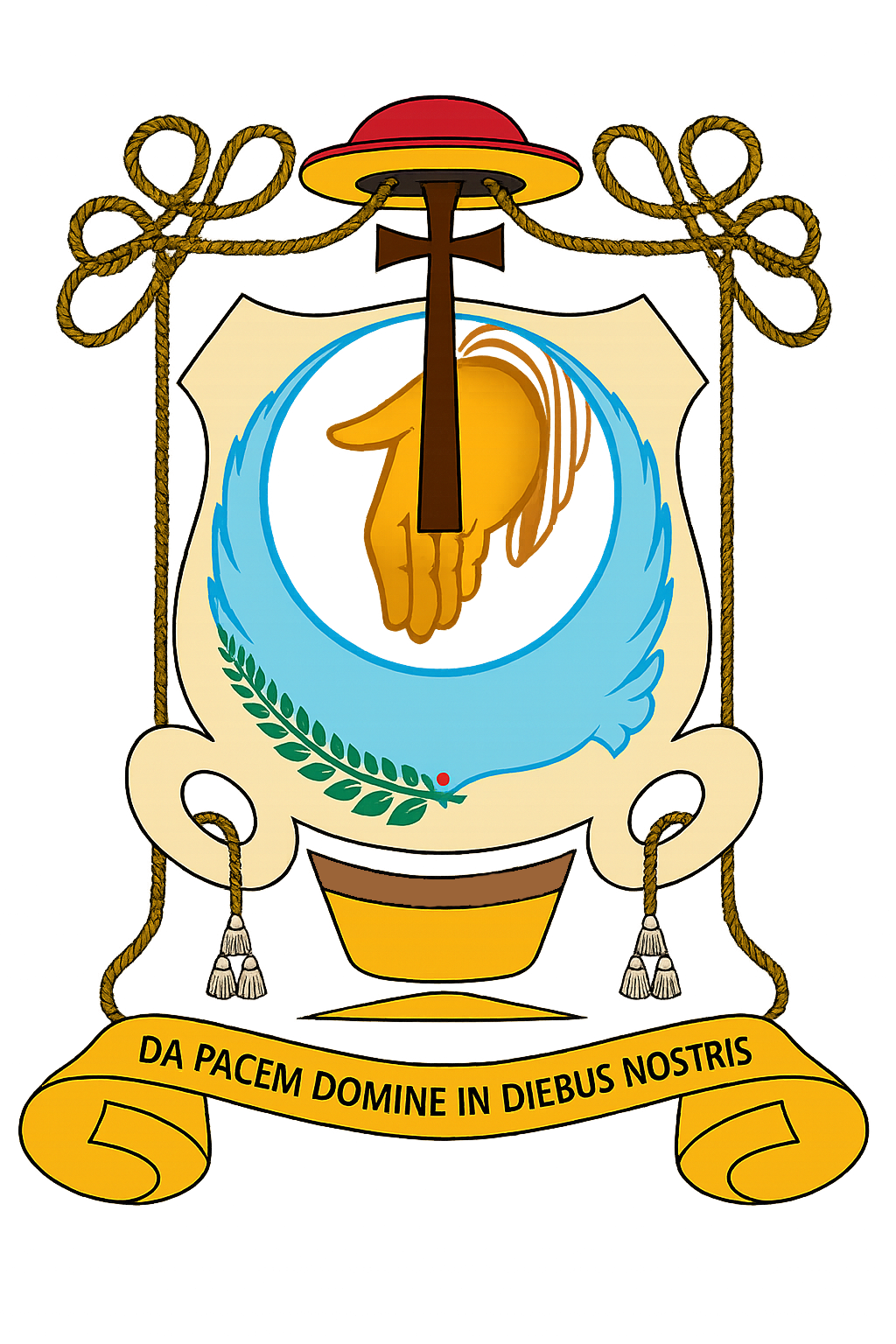
- Reference style: His Grace; The Most Reverend; The Right Reverend
- Spoken style: Your Grace
- Religious style: Bishop

=== Early life ===
Anaparambil was born on 7 March 1962, as the fifth child of Raphael and Brigit Anaparambil. He completed his primary education at St. Mary's High School, Chellanam and pursued minor seminary studies in Alappuzha, followed by major seminary studies at St. Joseph's Pontifical Seminary, Aluva. From 1993 to 1998, he pursued higher studies in biblical theology at the Pontifical Urban University, earning a doctoral degree in Jewish culture. He also holds a master's degree in Judaism from the Pontifical Gregorian University.

=== Priesthood ===
Anaparambil was ordained a priest on 17 December 1986, by Bishop Peter Chenaparambil. He later went onto hold various pastoral and academic roles within the Diocese of Alleppey. Early in his ministry, he served as chaplain at St. Thomas Parish in Thumpoly from 1986 to 1987. He later took on administrative responsibilities as Prefect and Procurator of Sacred Heart Minor Seminary in Mayithara and as the Diocesan Director of the Vocations Centre from 1989 to 1993.

His academic contributions included teaching biblical theology and Hebrew at St. Joseph's Pontifical Seminary in St. Joseph's Pontifical Seminary, Aluva from 1998 to 2013. During this time, he also held leadership positions, serving as President of the Faculty of Theology and Philosophy in Aluva between 2003 and 2006. From 2009 to 2012, he was appointed rector of St. Joseph's Pontifical Seminary, Carmelgiri.

In addition to his academic roles, Anaparambil was actively involved in diocesan administration. Between 2014 and 2016, he served as the Vicar General for Clergy, Religious, and Seminarians in the Diocese of Alleppey, overseeing the pastoral and spiritual formation of clergy and religious members within the diocese.

=== Bishop of Alleppey ===
On 7 December 2017, Pope Francis appointed Anaparambil as the Coadjutor Bishop of the Diocese of Alleppey, replacing the retiring Bishop Stephen Athipozhiyil. Anaparambil's installation in Alleppey took place on October 11, 2019

=== Apostolic Administrator of Cochin ===
On 12 October 2024, Anaparambil was appointed Apostolic Administrator sede plena of the Diocese of Cochin. The diocese became vacant following the retirement of Bishop Joseph Kariyil on 2 March 2024.

Catholic Church titles
Preceded by Stephen Athipozhiyil	Bishop of Alleppey; 2019–present	Succeeded by Incumbent
Preceded by Joseph Kariyil	Apostolic Administrator of Cochin; 2024–present	Succeeded by Antony Kattiparambil
