= K. N. P. Kurup =

Indian politician and journalist (1938–2019)

K.N.P. Kurup
- Kurup in 2013
- Born: 30 October 1938; Quilon district or Central Travancore, Travancore (present-day Alappuzha district, Kerala)
- Died: 10 January 2019 (aged 80); Parumala, Kerala, India
- Occupations: Politician, Journalist
- Years active: 1968–2010
- Known for: Political works and journalism
- Political party: CPI(M)
- Spouse: Thulasi Bhai
- Children: Manoj Kurup; Sindhu Kurup; Asha Kurup
- Parent(s): Narayana Pillai; Lakshmi Kutty Amma

K. Narayana Pillai Kurup (30 October 1938 – 10 January 2019) was an Indian politician, Communist leader and journalist. He is known for his work with the Government of Kerala in Kollam and Alapuzha. He is the founder of the evening daily Kerala Rajyam. He was the President of Edathuva Panchayat in Alapuzha. His biography, Poratta Vazhikalile Akshara Sooryan, was launched by Shri. Pinarayi Vijayan in 2010.

Kurup died on 10 January 2019, at the age of 80.
