= Peter Michael Chenaparampil =

His Excellency Peter Michael Chenaparampil
- Second bishop of the Diocese of Alleppey, India.
- Province: Kerala
- Diocese: Diocese of Alleppey
- Term ended: 9 December 2001 (Resigned)
- Predecessor: Rev. Dr. Michael Arattukulam
- Successor: Rev. Dr. Stephen Athipozhiyil

Orders
- Ordination: 1 June 1956
- Consecration: 4 September 1983

Personal details
- Born: 8 December 1929 Manakkodam, Cherthala, Alleppey, Kerala, India
- Died: 18 April 2013 (aged 83) Kochi, India
- Buried: Mount Carmel Roman Catholic Cathedral
- Denomination: Catholic

Peter Michael Chenaparampil (8 December 1929 – 18 April 2013) was the Roman Catholic bishop of the Diocese of Alleppey, India. Ordained to the priesthood in 1956, he was named bishop in 1984 and resigned in 2001.
