= Fernanda Riva =

Italian religious sister

Venerable Fernanda Riva FdCC
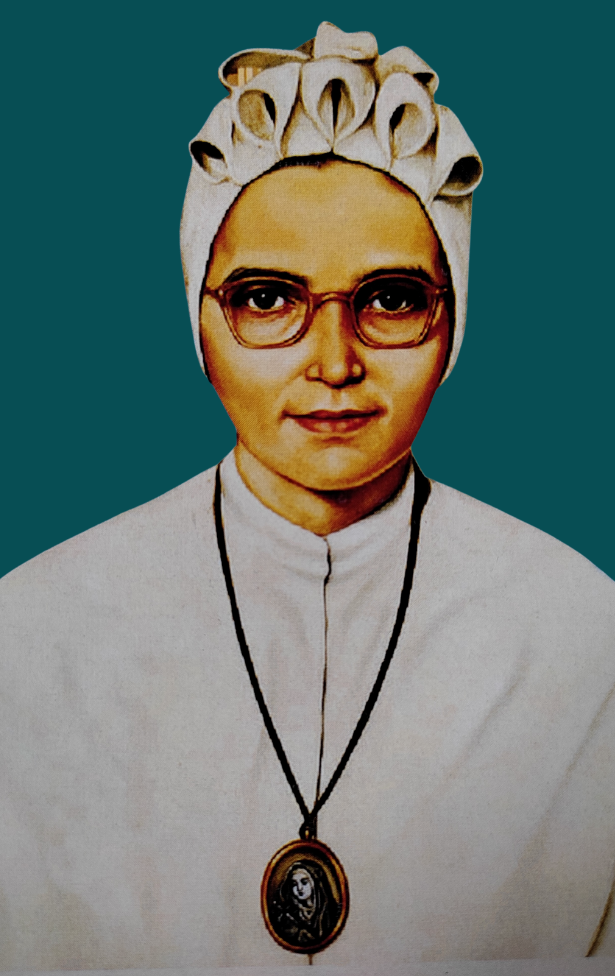
- Born: 17 April 1920; Monza, Italy
- Died: 22 January 1956 (aged 35); Mumbai, India

Fernanda Riva (17 April 1920 – 22 January 1956), was a Roman Catholic nun of Canossian Daughter of Charity congregation.

== Early life ==
Fernanda Riva was born on 17 April 1920 in Monza, Italy. She joined the Canossian Missionary Novitiate in Vimercate, Milan, on 19 March 1939. She continued her First Formation at St. Joseph's Convent, Belgaum, and pronounced her First Vows, on 24 December 1941. She completed her B.A., B. Ed at the Colleges in Belgaum from 1943 to 1947, and came to Mumbai for her master's degree in Education.

== Missionary to India ==
Riva came to Bombay (now Mumbai), India on 30 October 1939. She was principal of the St. Joseph's College for Women Alleppey, Kerala. From July 1950 to September 1953, Riva served at Canossa High School, Mahim, first as a teacher and then as principal. In September 1953, Riva was transferred to St. Joseph's Convent, Alleppey, Kerala, to start a new college there and became its first principal. She oversaw the entire process, from its construction to purchasing equipment.

== Death ==
She was admitted to St. Elizabeth's Nursing Home for cancer treatment under the supervision of Dr. Arthur D’Sa. She died on 22 January 1956 in Bombay. Within a year in 1954, she fell ill and was sent for a check-up to Mumbai. She was admitted to St. Elizabeth's Nursing Home and was operated upon by D’Sa in September 1954. She seemed to recover and under the doctor's advice returned to Alleppey after a month, on 30 October 1954.

However, on 6 January 1956, she had to be rushed back to Mumbai because of her illness, which turned out to be cancer. This time it struck her fatally. D’Sa and Valerian Cardinal Gracias visited her. They were touched by her serenity and faith. She had a kind word, a smile, a gesture of concern for those sisters and hospital staff who attended on her and gratitude for all. She died on 22 January 1956. Crowds filed past her body which lay in the Chapel of Canossa Convent, Mahim. Whispers of "She is a Saint" could be heard among the crowd gathered at her funeral. She was buried in the Cemetery of St. Michael's Church, Mahim. A few days after her death, this very Diocesan Bulletin "The Examiner" carried an article based on her illness and death.

== Beatification process ==
She was elevated to 'Servant of God' on 13 August 1994 by Simon Cardinal Pimenta. On 28 June 2012, she was declared venerable by Pope Benedict XVI.

Her bones are placed at st. Joseph's Canossian Copnvent, Allepey in Kerala, India.

Such was the sanctity of her life that Micheal Arattukulam, the then Bishop of Alleppey, asked that her Cause for Canonisation be introduced. On 13 August 1994, under the direction of Simon Cardinal Pimenta, the Cause was introduced, at St. Michael's Church Mahim.
