= Arthunkal =

Village in Kerala, India

- village
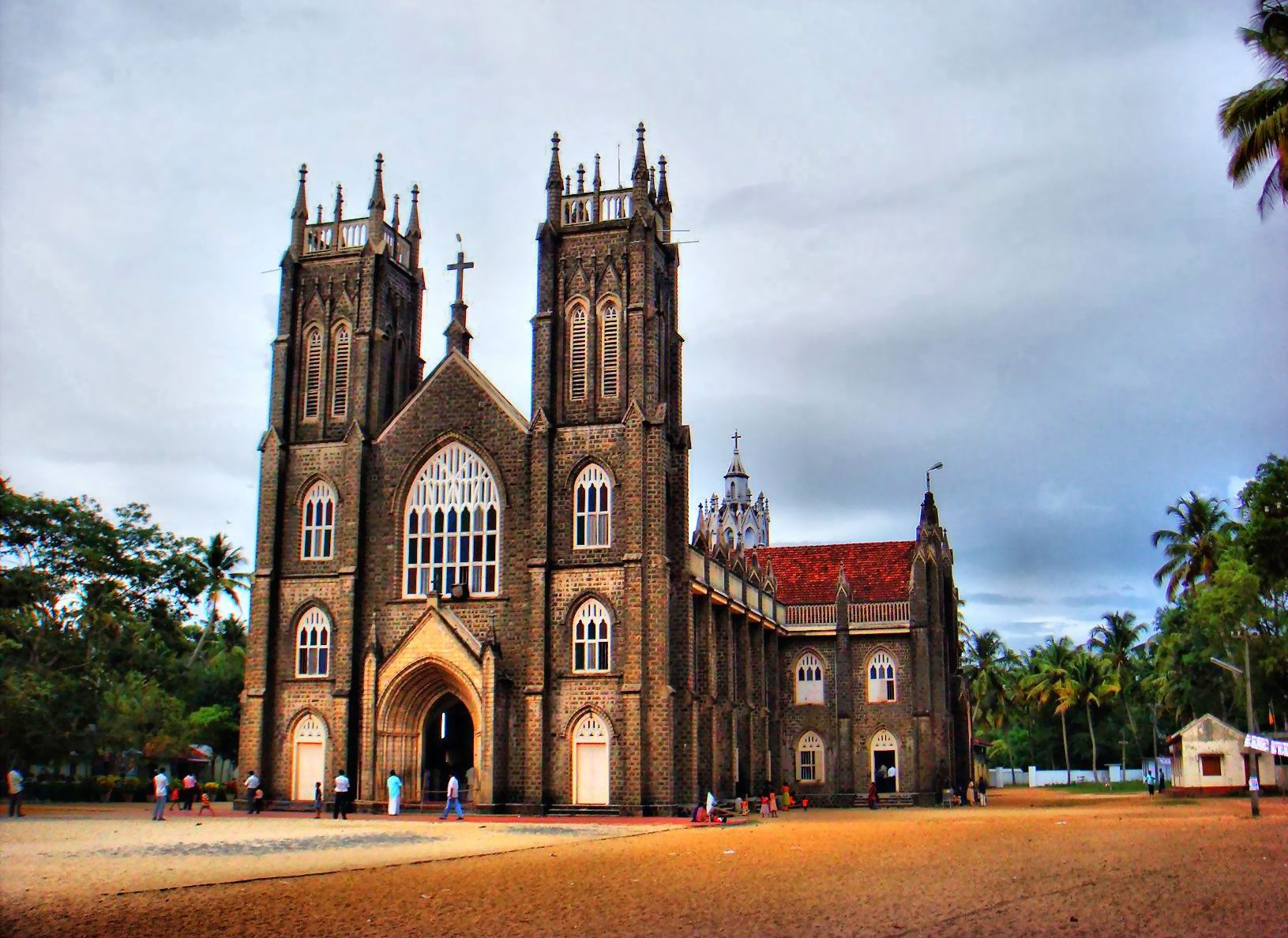
- St Andrew's Basilica, Arthunkal

- Location in Kerala, India Arthunkal (India)
- Coordinates: 9.661114°N 76.300454°E
- Country: India
- State: Kerala
- District: Alappuzha

Languages
  - Official: Malayalam, English
- Time zone: UTC+5:30 (IST)
- PIN: 688530
- Telephone code: +91 478
- Vehicle registration: KL-32
- Nearest city: Kochi
- Lok Sabha constituency: Alappuzha
- Vidhan Sabha constituency: Cherthala

Arthunkal is a coastal town and a major pilgrim centre in the south Indian state of Kerala. It is 40 kilometre south of Cochin city and 21 kilometre north of Alleppey town. It is a rapidly developing satellite town of Kochi. Arthunkal lies in the taluk of Cherthala, which is in turn a part of the district of Alleppey.

== Religious significance ==
=== Pilgrimage site ===
Arthunkal is one of the most important pilgrimage sites in Kerala. It is considered as a holy land by hundreds of thousands of devotees, of Christian as well as other faith. The village is synonymous for its church, which has the Roman martyr Saint Sebastian as its patron. The feast of St. Sebastian in Arthunkal is a grand celebration extending for two weeks in January. While the main day of the traditional feast or the perunnal is on January 20, the church authorities have instituted another on January 27, to mark the end of celebrations, locally referred to as Ettamperunnal or 'the 8th day of the feast'. Devotees from all across the state visit the church on the feast days. A procession, carrying the graceful statue of St. Sebastian, from the church to the beach and back, is the most important event of the feast. An eagle is seen roaming the skies, every year during the time of the procession. This eagle too has become part of the grandmother stories, about the presence of St. Sebastian as a guardian saint for the village.

=== Thanksgiving ===
Many devotees, who recovered from serious illness or closely escaped accidents, often visit this pilgrim site to offer thanks to St. Sebastian. It is believed that the saint has powers to heal the maimed, crippled and those with mental disorders. Thus many disabled people also visit the shrine. Devotees often express gratitude by crawling on their knees, known as Urulunercha, on the road from the beach to the church, and make offerings - small metal replicas of bows and arrows.

=== St. Andrew's Basilica, Arthunkal, Cherthala ===
The church, officially St. Andrew's Basilica, Arthunkal, was originally built by the Portuguese missionaries in the 16th century. It has a fascinating history. The church was rebuilt in 1584, under the then vicar Fr. Jacoma Fenicio, whom the devotees claim, possessed magical powers to heal the body and mind. Devotees fondly referred to him as Arthunkal Veluthachan, which in English translates to fair skinned father. Fr. Fenicio died in 1632. Eight years after his death, the church was rebuilt again, this time facing the west towards the long white-sand beach on the shores of the Arabian Sea. In 1647, the statue of St. Sebastian, struck with arrows all over his bleeding body (he was executed at the order of the Roman emperor for embracing Christian faith) sculptured in Milan, was brought and placed in the Arthunkal church. Arthunkal St Andrews Forane Church, the first Parish of the Diocese of Alleppey has been elevated to the status of Basilica on 9 July 2010. Thumpoli Palli is the church that deserves to be the second "Minor Basilica" pilgrimage church in the diocese.

== Facilities ==
A large open space between the St Francis Assisi Higher Secondary school and the church, is the heart of Arthunkal. The school, with buildings sprinkled on both side of the road that leads from the church to the beach. The village also has a fairly equipped hospital, a nursing school, a Teacher Training Institute, a Central School, One English medium school( Fr. Xavier Aresseril Memorial English Medium School CBSE. It is under the management of a Trust named Aresseril Educational And Charitable Trust Reethapuram, Arthunkal ), and a small shopping center near the school comprising about two dozen shops leased by the church to local businessmen. State Bank of India, Alleppey District Cooperative Bank and Arthunkal Village Service Cooperative Bank are major Banks in this place. The church owns bulk of the non-resident land-bank in the village. There is another church in the village, which hosts St. George as its patron saint, about half-mile away from the Arthunkal Basilica. A fishing harbour is also being built in Arthunkal. The theeradesa highway or the coastal highway, is expected to better connect the seaside villages of Alappuzha, including Arthunkal, with suburban Kochi.

== Gallery ==
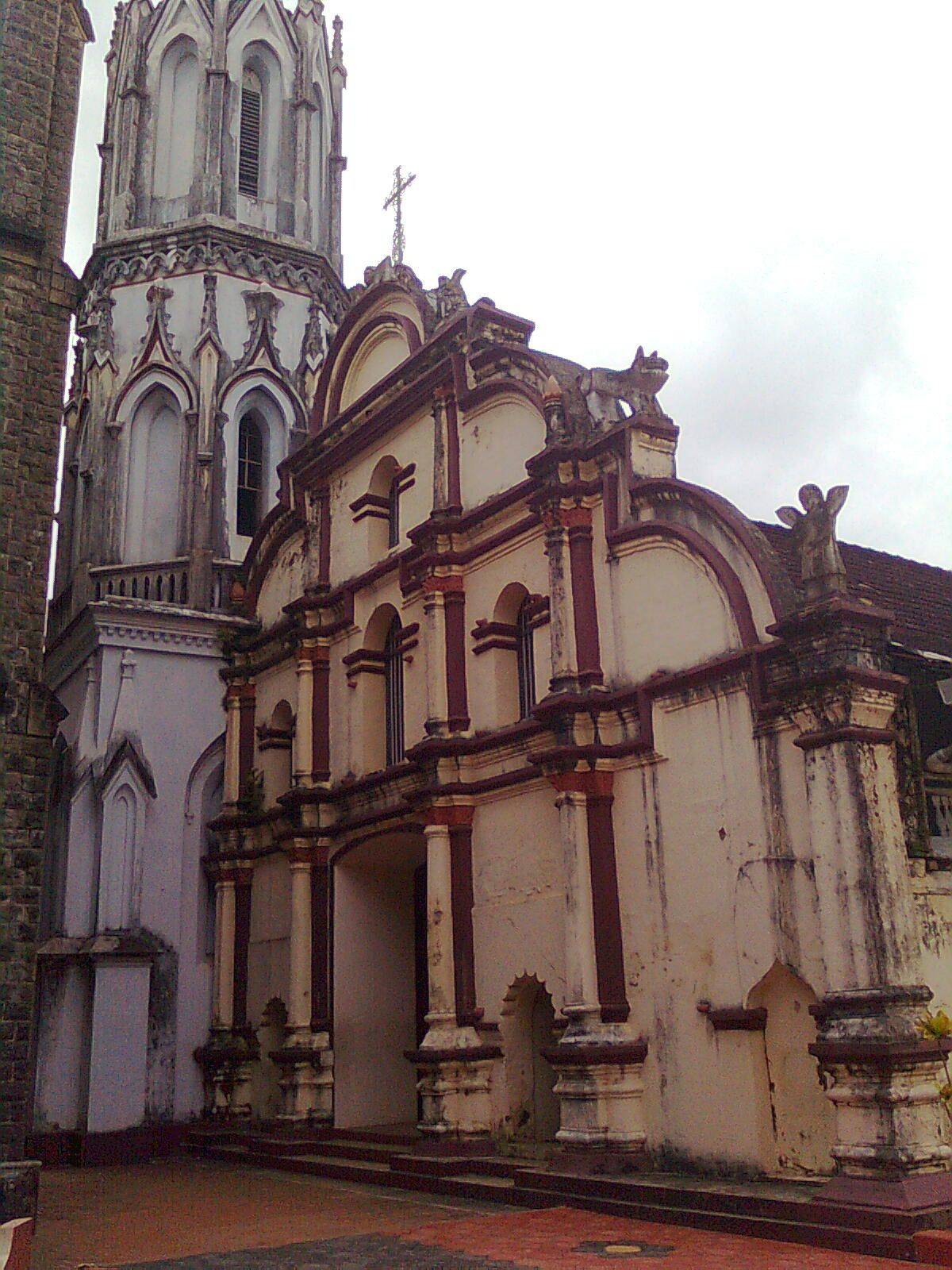
Old Church at Arthunkal

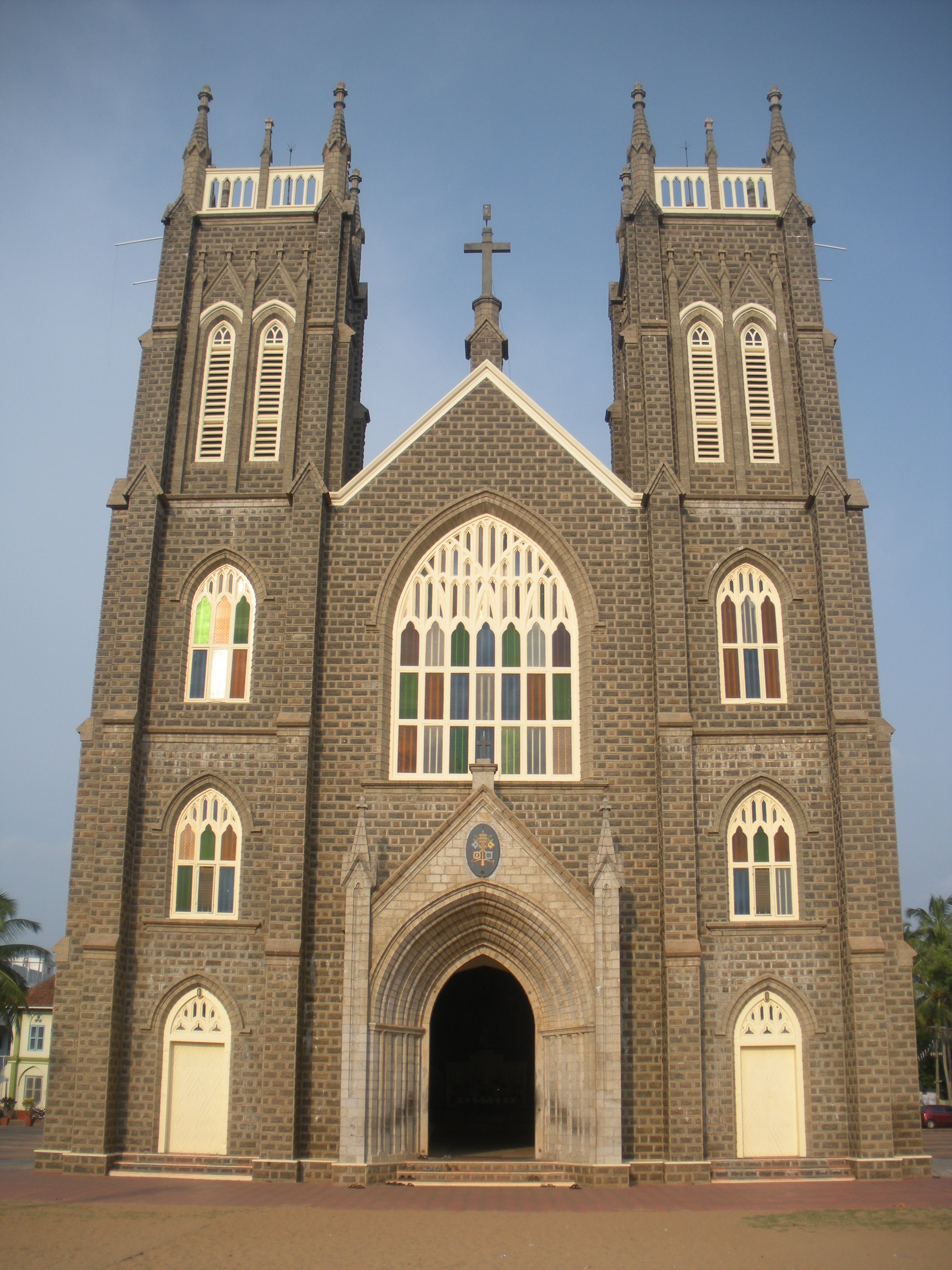
Front View of Church

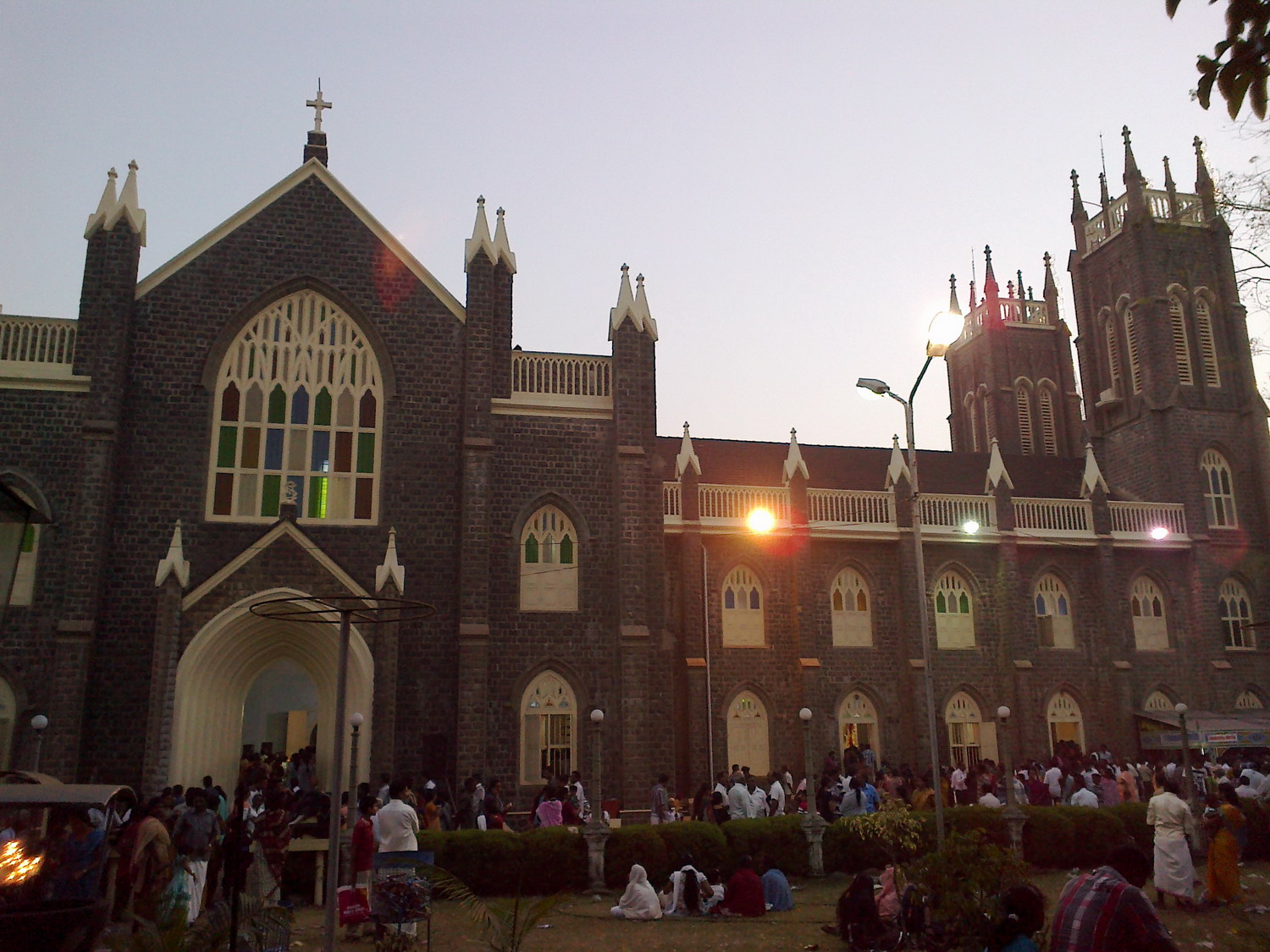
Arthunkal Church during Feast

== See also ==
- St. Andrew's Basilica, Arthunkal
- Arthunkal Veluthachan
