= Francisco Diego =

Mexican artist

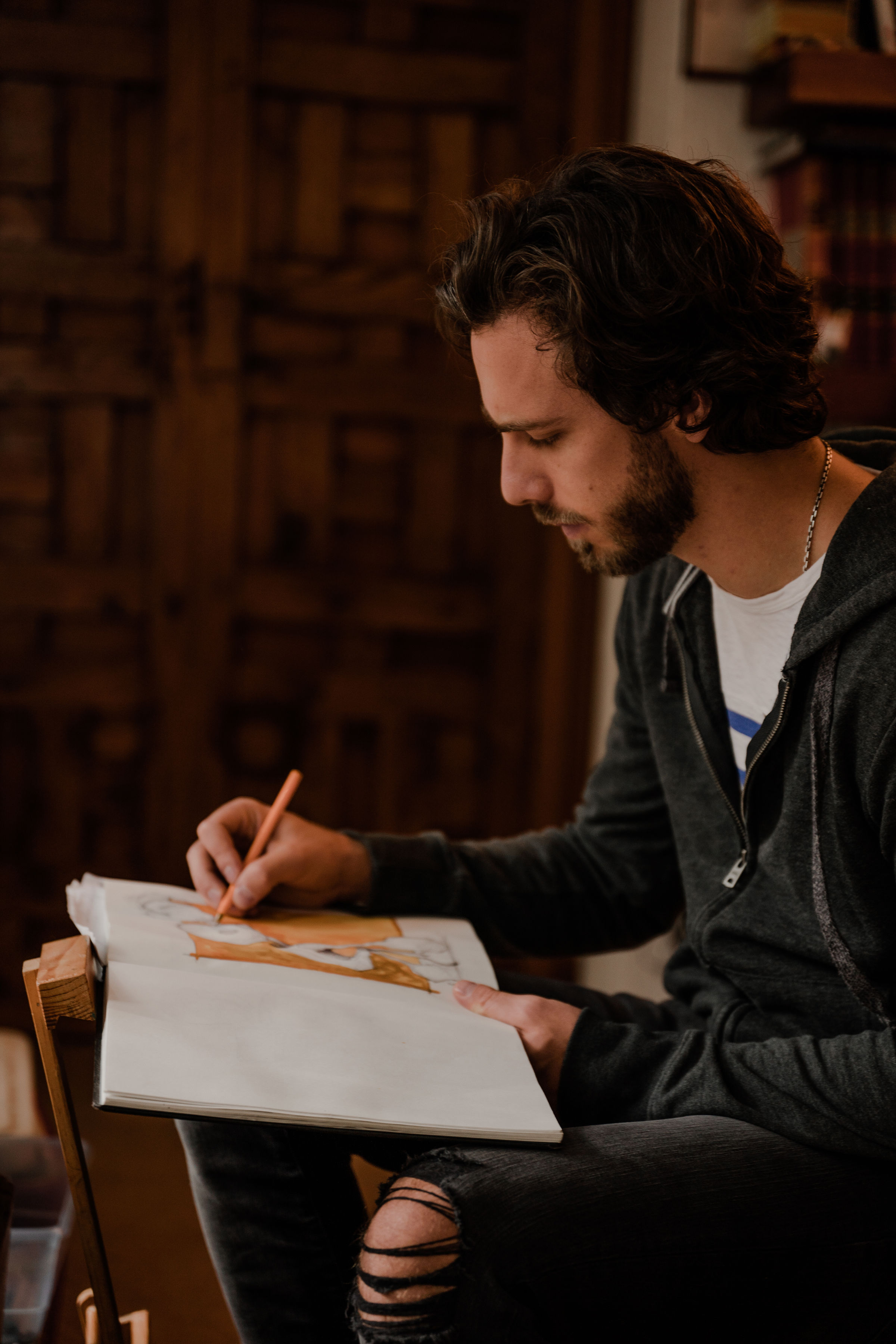
- Born: Francisco Diego Fernández Wiechers; October 26, 1991; Torreón, Coahuila, México
- Education: UIA, Mexico City, México
- Known for: Painting, drawing, sculpture, writing, singing
- Notable work: Y cuando regresó ya lo habían cambiado (2016)
- Movement: Sketch, Oil-on-canvas

Francisco Diego is a Mexican plastic artist.

His most recent exposition “Mexico in a Blink” took place in San Francisco and will travel through United States along the year.

== Biography ==
Diego was born on October 26, 1991, in Torreón, Coahuila, México. At a very young age He moved to the historical city of Querétaro in Mexico where he started painting.

Influenced by his artistic background he left Querétaro to start his studies. He completed a design degree at Universidad Iberoamericana in Mexico City and Politecnico di Torino in Turin, Italy.

He established his own studio in Mexico City.

== Philosophy ==
Life is like a white canvas, each line drawn, smooth or rough is an action taken. As in life, actions can’t be erased. The only thing to correct any misplaced stroke is to keep drawing and reinforcing the final silhouette. Aware of this poetic point of view about life, Francisco Diego only uses permanent black ink. If you stare closely at any Francisco Diego you might see all the previous strokes, making viewers wonder about the process of creation.

== Exhibitions ==
- "Al" Embassy in Mexico, Mexico City, 2018.
- "SNAC Gallery" Touring North America, 2018.
- "Ethos" in Museo Franz Mayer, Mexico City, 2018.
- "Mexico in a Blink", San Francisco, California, US, 2017–2018.
- "Black Dott", México City, 2018.
- "555 Project", Mexico City, 2017.
- "Dimensión −1", Museo de Arte Sacro, Querétaro, 2016.
