= Nereo =

Nereo may refer to:

- An alternative name of the Greek deity Nereus
- Nereo Cave, a huge underwater sea-cave in the Coral riviera of Alghero, Italy
- Nereo Bolzon (born 1960), Canadian football player
- Nereo Champagne (born 1985), Argentine football goalkeeper
- Nereo Fernández (born 1979), Argentine footballer
- Nereo Laroni (1942–2019), Italian politician
- Nereo Rocco (1912–1979), Italian football player and manager

== See also ==
- Nereocystis, a genus of kelp
- Nereus (disambiguation)
