= Sparsh =

Sparsh, the Sanskrit word for "touch", may refer to:

- Sparsh (film), a 1980 Indian Hindi film
- Sparsh (software), a data-transfer program
- Sparsh (festival), an annual cultural festival at Sardar Vallabhbhai National Institute of Technology in Surat, India
- Sparsh (album), a 2000 album by Zubeen Garg
- Sparsh Khanchandani (born 2000), Indian actress
- Sparsh Srivastav

== See also ==
- Sparśa, a Buddhist term
- Sparsha (film), a 1999 Indian Kannada film
