= Nerus =

Nerus may refer to:

- Nerus Ginting Suka (1898–1955),
- Nerus, fictional character in Stargate SG-1 played by Maury Chaykin
- Tanidia Nerus, alias of Gaius Helen Mohiam in the Dune universe
- Nerus Engineering, racing car company
- Nerus (political slur), literally "non-Russian", xenophobic slur used by Russian nationalists

== See also ==
- Nereus (disambiguation), Indonesian politician
