= Formula Hybrid =

Coordinates: 55°48′08″N 37°31′44″E

2009 Winner Texas A&M getting sideways during 2009 Endurance event

Formula Hybrid is a design and engineering challenge for undergraduate and graduate college and university students. Started at the Thayer School of Engineering at Dartmouth College, and sponsored by the Society of Automotive Engineers, the competition is a spinoff of the Formula SAE competition based on hybrid vehicle technology. They must design, build, and compete an open-wheel, single-seat race car. This car must conform to a formula which emphasizes drive train innovation and fuel efficiency in a high-performance application.

The contest are held at the New Hampshire Motor Speedway, Loudon, New Hampshire. It was founded in 2006. In 2013, an all-electric category was added.

The Formula Hybrid student automotive design competition encourages the development of hybrid automotive drive trains with an emphasis on efficiency in a high-performance application. Improved efficiency in an automotive drive system can be used to increase fuel economy, performance, or both. Building on the Formula SAE program, Formula Hybrid adds an extra level of complexity: fuel efficiency.

Like Formula SAE events, the Hybrid competition includes an acceleration test, autocross and endurance events, as well as engineering and construction static events. Unlike Formula SAE, Formula Hybrid events put a greater emphasis on drive train innovation and fuel efficiency.

== Formula SAE Hybrid rules ==
For the Formula Hybrid competition conducted in 2007 and 2008, the Formula SAE rules for each of these years were utilized for the construction of the car, with the addition of Hybrid specific rules specifying the type of fuel and the hybrid definitions. Also defined are details of a competitor car that might be in the developmental stage defined as ‘Hybrid-in-Progress’ car. A 'Hybrid-in-Progress' is an all-electric car, under the idea that next year the car will be upgraded to a full hybrid powertrain.

The difference noted in the rules state that a ‘hybrid’ Formula car must complete a 75-meter acceleration run in electric-only mode in less than 10 seconds. In terms of the engine capacities for the internal combustion engine, 250cc spark ignition engine or a 310cc diesel engine can be used.

Starting in 2009, the Formula Hybrid rules stood alone as a complete document, incorporating the necessary car construction and safety rules from the Formula SAE rulebook. One large change for 2009 was the fuel allotment. In 2007–2008, teams were given an allotment to cover the entire event. In 2009, this allotment was smaller, but was only applied to the endurance event. Teams were free to use as much fuel as needed for the other events, provided the car was filled by event officials.

== Winners ==
Year	Overall Event Winner	Best Hybrid-in-Progress	Best Hybrid Systems Engineering
2015	(Canada) University of Waterloo (Hybrid), (United States) Tufts University (Electric)		
2014	(United States) University of Idaho		
2013	(United States) Yale University		(Canada) McMaster University
2012	(United States) Brigham Young University, (Canada) University of Sherbrooke (tie)	(United States) University of Kansas	(United States) University of Texas - Arlington
2011	(United States) Texas A&M University	(United States) Milwaukee School of Engineering	(United States) Texas A&M University
2010	(Italy) Politecnico Di Torino	(United States) Florida State University	(United States) Illinois Institute of Technology
2009	(United States) Texas A&M University	(United States) California Polytechnic State University	(United States) Brigham Young University
2008	(Canada) McGill University	(United States) University of Vermont	(United States) University of Vermont
2007	(Canada) McGill University	(United States) Florida Institute of Technology	(United States) Embry-Riddle Aeronautical University

== Competition events ==
=== Acceleration runs ===
The acceleration is a test of the engines, motors, and vehicle weight; It is also a test of how efficiently the team achieve the coupling of the electrical and mechanical power-train systems. The acceleration runs are broken down to two different categories - the fully electric acceleration run and the unrestricted acceleration run. In the fully electric acceleration run the team are only allowed to utilize the power delivered by the electric system i.e., the accumulator pack (batteries or capacitors) and electric motor system. In unlimited acceleration, the teams are free to use any system (or combination of systems) they wish.

=== Autocross event ===
The autocross event involves an open loop circuit designed with chicanes, speed traps and slaloms. In 2007, the autocross competition was held in the parking lot next to the Turn 1 grandstands. In 2008 and 2009, the autocross competition was on a circuit built on the NASCAR oval track on turn 4. The competition event is designed to test the ability of the car to go around the circuit at maximum speed and drive around the tight bends and turns. The objective of the competition is to set the fastest time from the starting point and the ending point of the circuit. As with Formula SAE, the course is marked with orange traffic cones. Hitting a cone incurs a 2 sec penalty, while failure to follow the course results in a 20 sec penalty.

=== Endurance event ===
The endurance event is similar to the autocross track, except that it is closed loop and more spacious. As with the auto-x event, the course is marked with traffic cones; hitting a cone incurs a 2 sec penalty and a failure to follow the course incurs a 20 sec penalty. The Formula Hybrid cars are stipulated to drive a total of 22 kilometers in distance with one driver change pit stop at the half way mark. The pit stop can also be used to inspect minor details on the car by the team, but are not allowed any changes or allowed to add any fuel. The objective of the endurance race is to finish with the fastest race time while not running out of your allotted fuel. McGill University repeated this feat in 2008 where the only other team to finish the 40-lap race was Illinois Institute of Technology which finished second.

The 2009 endurance course was longer than past years, there were only 24 total laps to cover the 22 km distance, compared to 40 laps for 2008. A total of 6 cars finished the 24 laps: Texas A&M University won, with Cal Poly SLO second and Drexel University third. The other three finishers were University of California Irvine, Colorado State University, and McGill University, respectively.

=== Design event ===
The Formula Hybrid competition includes an analysis and critique of the engineering design and construction of the vehicle, with an emphasis on drive train innovation, fuel efficiency, and sustainable manufacturing practices.

== 2007 Competition ==
The 2007 Formula Hybrid Competition was organized in Loudon, New Hampshire at the New Hampshire International Speedway. A total of 6 teams participated in the competition. Though a bigger number of teams were registered for the competition, only these 6 teams were successful in getting a competitive car to the event. The six teams are the SAE teams from the universities of Embry-Riddle Aeronautical University, Illinois Institute of Technology, McGill University, Dartmouth College, Florida Institute of Technology and Yale University.

The inaugural competition had three events that were designed to judge the hybrid Formula car and their performance. The overall winner is determined by two categorical events – dynamic and static events. The static events included a technical inspection, a safety inspection and the official weighing of the formula cars. The dynamic events included an acceleration run, an autocross race and an endurance event. McGill University finished the fastest in autocross competition and also finished fastest in the endurance race. Yale University's car was the fastest in electric-only acceleration. Florida Institute of Technology's car was the fastest in the unrestricted acceleration event. Florida Institute of Technology, Illinois Institute of Technology and Yale University, represented their school's first entry into any Formula SAE competition.

In the 2007 competitions, the official results were as follows:

1st Place Overall – Hybrid: McGill University
2nd Place Overall – Hybrid: Embry-Riddle Aeronautical University
3rd Place Overall – Hybrid: Yale University

Best Hybrid in Progress: Florida Institute of Technology
Most Innovative Design: Embry-Riddle Aeronautical University
Best Hybrid Systems Engineering*: Embry-Riddle Aeronautical University

Special note * = Prize sponsored by DaimlerChrysler AG (before the split to Daimler AG and Chrysler LLC)

== 2008 Competition ==
The 2008 Formula Hybrid Competition was organized in Loudon, New Hampshire at the New Hampshire International Speedway. Held for three days from May 5 to May 7, the competition saw the total number of registered teams increase to 15 teams; student teams from across the world like McGill University from Canada, MADI State Technical University from Russia and National Chiao Tung University from Taiwan. A total of 12 teams arrived at the competition and 9 teams participated with a formula car on the track. The twelve teams were the SAE teams from the universities of Dartmouth College, Embry-Riddle Aeronautical University, Illinois Institute of Technology, University of Vermont, McGill University, North Carolina State University, University of Wisconsin–Madison, Drexel University, Florida Institute of Technology and Yale University.

The second annual competition was conducted on the same competition pattern as in the 2007 competition (see above). The difference to be noted was that the autocross in the 2007 competition was conducted in the parking lot of the racetrack. In 2008, the autocross event was conducted on the oval part of the NASCAR track on Turn 4. In 2008, there were a higher number of teams from across the United States. McGill University finished with the fastest time in the autocross competition as well as the endurance race. Dartmouth College's car finished fastest in both the unrestricted and electric-only acceleration runs. Illinois Institute of Technology was the only other team which completed the 40 lap endurance race. Embry-Riddle Aeronautical University only managed to finish 32 laps while Drexel University managed to finish only 25 laps of the endurance race.

In the 2008 competition, the official results were as follows:

1st Place Overall – Hybrid: McGill University
2nd Place Overall – Hybrid: Embry-Riddle Aeronautical University
3rd Place Overall – Hybrid: Illinois Institute of Technology

== 2009 Competition ==
The 2009 Formula Hybrid Competition was held for three days from May 4 to May 6 with the first day dedicated to technical inspections by SAE, IEEE and industry officials. The number of registered teams increase to 30 teams, nearly four times the number of teams in the first year of the competition in 2007.

The student teams are coming from across the world like McGill University and University of Manitoba from Canada, MADI State Technical University from Russia, National Chiao Tung University from Taiwan, Sardar Vallabhbhai National Institute of Technology from India and Thapar University also from India. The returning teams are from the universities of Dartmouth College, Embry-Riddle Aeronautical University, Illinois Institute of Technology, University of Vermont, McGill University, North Carolina State University, University of Wisconsin–Madison, Drexel University, Florida Institute of Technology, University of California Irvine and Yale University. The new teams from United States are from California State Polytechnic University, Pomona, Arizona State University, Rensselaer Polytechnic Institute, Colorado State University, University of Alabama - Tuscaloosa, Texas A&M University and University of California, San Diego, to name a few. Illinois Institute of Technology was the only team to register two cars with distinct hybrid drive-train systems - WISER Hawks I and Wiser Hawks II. They only ran the parallel-hybrid; the series hybrid was not finished due to the complex high-voltage electrical connections.

In the competition, 21 teams officially scored points in the various events – design, acceleration runs, autocross and endurance race. The total points possible were a 1000 (per team). For the static events, each team could score a maximum of 300 points and for the dynamic (racing) events, each team could score a maximum of 700 points.

The official results of the 2009 competition are as follows:

1st Place Overall – Hybrid: Texas A&M University 981 out of 1000 points
2nd Place Overall – Hybrid: Colorado State University 758 points
3rd Place Overall – Hybrid: Drexel University 689 points

There were also 1st, 2nd and 3rd place awards for 'Hybrid-in-Progress'.
1st Place Overall – Hybrid-in-progress: Cal Poly SLO
2nd Place Overall – Hybrid-in-progress: Tufts University
3rd Place Overall – Hybrid-in-progress: University of California, San Diego

Individual Event Results:
Static Events:
Presentation: Texas A&M University
Design: Texas A&M University

Dynamic Events:
Electric Acceleration: Colorado State University
Unlimited Acceleration: Colorado State University
Autocross: Texas A&M University
Endurance: Texas A&M University

Most Innovative Design: Brigham Young University
Best Hybrid Systems Engineering*: Brigham Young University
Special note * = Prize sponsored by Chrysler LLC

== 2010 Competition ==
The 2010 Formula Hybrid Competition was organized in Loudon, New Hampshire at the New Hampshire International Speedway. The event was held for four days from May 3 through May 6 with the first day dedicated to technical inspections by SAE, IEEE and industry officials. The primary purpose of these inspections is the overall safety of the student-built racing car and the need to certify this safety will enable the team to participate in the competition. The competition has consistently seen a substantial rise in the number of teams. The total number of registered teams was thirty. In the competition, twenty-four teams officially scored points in the various events – presentation, design, acceleration runs, autocross and endurance race. The total points possible were a 1000 (per team). For the static events, each team could score a maximum of 300 points and for the dynamic (racing) events, each team could score a maximum of 700 points.

The official results of the 2010 competition are as follows:

1st Place Overall – Hybrid: Politecnico di Torino 943 out of 1000 points
2nd Place Overall – Hybrid: Texas A&M University 939 points
3rd Place Overall – Hybrid: University of California, Davis 748 points

There were also 1st, 2nd and 3rd place awards for 'Hybrid-in-Progress'.
1st Place Overall – Hybrid-in-progress: Florida A&M /Florida State University
2nd Place Overall – Hybrid-in-progress: Lawrence Technological University
3rd Place Overall – Hybrid-in-progress: Milwaukee School of Engineering

Individual Event Results:
Static Events:
Presentation: Texas A&M University
Design: Politecnico di Torino, Italy

Dynamic Events:
Electric Acceleration: University of Vermont
Unlimited Acceleration: Texas A&M University
Autocross: Politecnico di Torino, Italy
Endurance: Politecnico di Torino, Italy

IEEE Future of Engineering Award: Politecnico di Torino, Italy
GM Best Hybrid Systems Engineering: Illinois Institute of Technology

== 2011 Competition ==
Dartmouth's 5th Annual Formula Hybrid Competition took place in Loudon, New Hampshire at the New Hampshire International Speedway. The event was held for four days from May 1 through May 4 with the first day dedicated to technical inspections by SAE, IEEE and industry officials. The primary purpose of these inspections is the overall safety of the student-built racing car and the need to certify this safety will enable the team to participate in the competition. The competition has consistently seen a substantial rise in the number of teams. The total number of registered teams increased to thirty-four, over five times the number of teams in the first year of the competition in 2007. In the competition, twenty-one teams officially scored points in the various events – presentation, design, acceleration runs, autocross and endurance race. The total points possible were a 1000 (per team). For the static events, each team could score a maximum of 300 points and for the dynamic (racing) events, each team could score a maximum of 700 points.

The official results of the 2011 competition are as follows:

1st Place Overall –Texas A&M University
2nd Place Overall –Brigham Young University
3rd Place Overall –Lund University, Sweden

There were also 1st and 2nd place awards for 'Hybrid-in-Progress'.
1st Place Overall – Hybrid-in-progress: Milwaukee School of Engineering
2nd Place Overall – Hybrid-in-progress: Drexel University

Individual Event Results:
Static Events:
Presentation: Brigham Young University
Design: Lund University, Sweden

Dynamic Events:
Electric Acceleration: Texas A&M University
Unlimited Acceleration: Texas A&M University
Autocross: Texas A&M University
Endurance: Brigham Young University

IEEE Future of Engineering Award: Lund University, Sweden
GM Best Hybrid Systems Engineering Award: Texas A&M University
Chrysler Best Hybrid Systems Engineering Award: Dartmouth College

== 2012 Competition ==
The 6th Annual Formula Hybrid Competition was organized in Loudon, New Hampshire at the New Hampshire International Speedway. The event was held for four days from April 30 through May 3 with the first day dedicated to technical inspections by SAE, IEEE and industry officials. The primary purpose of these inspections is the overall safety of the student-built racing car and the need to certify this safety will enable the team to participate in the competition. The competition has consistently seen a substantial rise in the number of teams. The total number of registered increased to thirty-nine, over six times the number of teams in the first year of competition in 2007. In the competition, twenty-five teams officially scored points in the various events – presentation, design, acceleration runs, autocross and endurance race. The total points possible were a 1000 (per team). For the static events, each team could score a maximum of 300 points and for the dynamic (racing) events, each team could score a maximum of 700 points.

The official results of the 2012 competition are as follows:

1st Place Overall – Hybrid: Universite de Sherbrooke
1st Place Overall – Hybrid: Brigham Young University
3rd Place Overall – Hybrid: Universitat Politecnica de Catalunya

The scores of the first two finishers in the Hybrid category were within 0.2% of one another, and because the uncertainties in some of the event scores exceeded that value, the organizers decided to award two first-place trophies for 2012 Overall Hybrid.

There were also 1st, 2nd and 3rd place awards for Electric-only*.
1st Place Overall –Electric-only: University of Kansas (Lawrence)
2nd Place Overall –Electric-only: Illinois Institute of Technology (WISER)
3rd Place Overall –Electric-only: Drexel University

- Beginning in 2012, the Hybrid-in-progress (HIP) class was renamed Electric-only and the rules changed slightly to make the vehicles more compatible with the newly announced FSAE-Electric class.

Individual Event Results:
Static Events:
Presentation: Dartmouth College
Design: Universite de Sherbrooke tied with University of Kansas (Lawrence)

Dynamic Events:
Electric Acceleration: University of Kansas (Lawrence)
Unlimited Acceleration: Brigham Young University
Autocross: University of Kansas (Lawrence)
Endurance: University of Texas (Arlington) tied with Illinois Institute of Technology (WISER)

IEEE Future of Engineering Award: University of Kansas (Lawrence)
IEEE Excellence in EV Engineering: University of Kansas (Lawrence)
GM Best Engineered Hybrid Award:
1st Place - University of Texas (Arlington)
2nd Place - Universite de Sherbrooke
3rd Place - Dartmouth College

== 2013 Competition ==
The 2013 Formula Hybrid Competition is being held in Loudon, New Hampshire at the New Hampshire International Speedway from April 29 through May 2, 2013.
