= Gaurav Path =

Road in Surat, India

Gaurav Path is an expressway in Piplod, Surat, India. It was designed and constructed by the Surat Municipal Corporation as a part of a plan to connect Surat with its airport, Magdalla Sea Port and Dumas Village. The expressway replaced the prior Surat-Dumas Road and is one of the best examples of Town and City Planning in India. This short expressway is over 2 km long.

This expressway has three travel lanes in each direction, two service lanes and a Bus Rapid Transit System (BRTS) lane in each direction. There are only two exits, the SVNIT Circle at Icchanath and Kargil Chowk at Piplod. It was designed to meet international standards and was integrated with BRTS. There is a study being carried out on IPTS (Integrated Public Transport System) by CES which is supported by the GIDB (Gujarat Industrial development Board).

There are several illuminated bus stops either side of the expressway, which can be accessed through paved, broad footpaths. These footpaths divide the expressway with its service roads on either side.

The road also features robotic street sweeping systems, operated by the Surat Municipal Corporation.

== The starting point ==
Parle-Point – The actual widening of expressway starts from Simandhar Apartment

== Traffic circles ==
- SVNIT Circle (Icchanath Circle)
- Kargil Chowk (previously known as Piplod Circle)

== Educational institutions ==
Sardar Vallabhbhai National Institute of Technology, Kendriya Vidhyalaya Surat No:1, Shardayatan High School, Lancer Army School

== Multiplexes, malls, restaurants and recreational places ==
Lakeview Garden, Floral Garden, Lakeview Restaurant, Nescafe Coffee Bar, Rajhans Cinema, Valentine Multiplex, Big Bazaar, ISCON Mall, Surat Central at Irish Mall, Lalbhai Contractor Cricket Stadium VR (Virtuous Retailers) mall, Rahul Raj Mall, Yoko Sizzlers and Croma at Ripple Mall, Vijay Sales (electronics mall), Shri Govardhannathji Ki Haveli, Domino's Pizza, Burger King, Subway, McDonald's

2006 Surat Flood, Submerged Gaurav Path

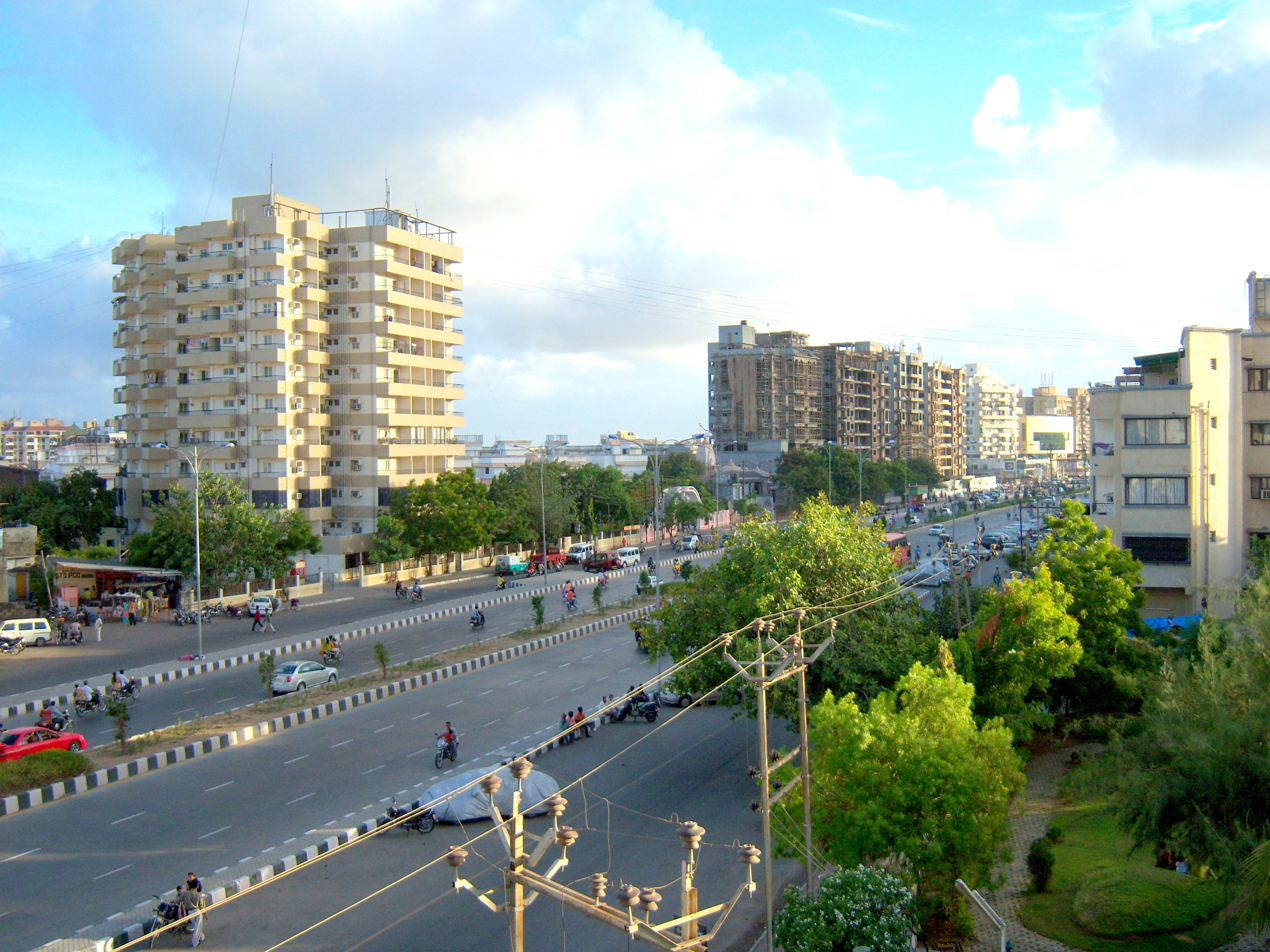
Gaurav Path, Day Time view

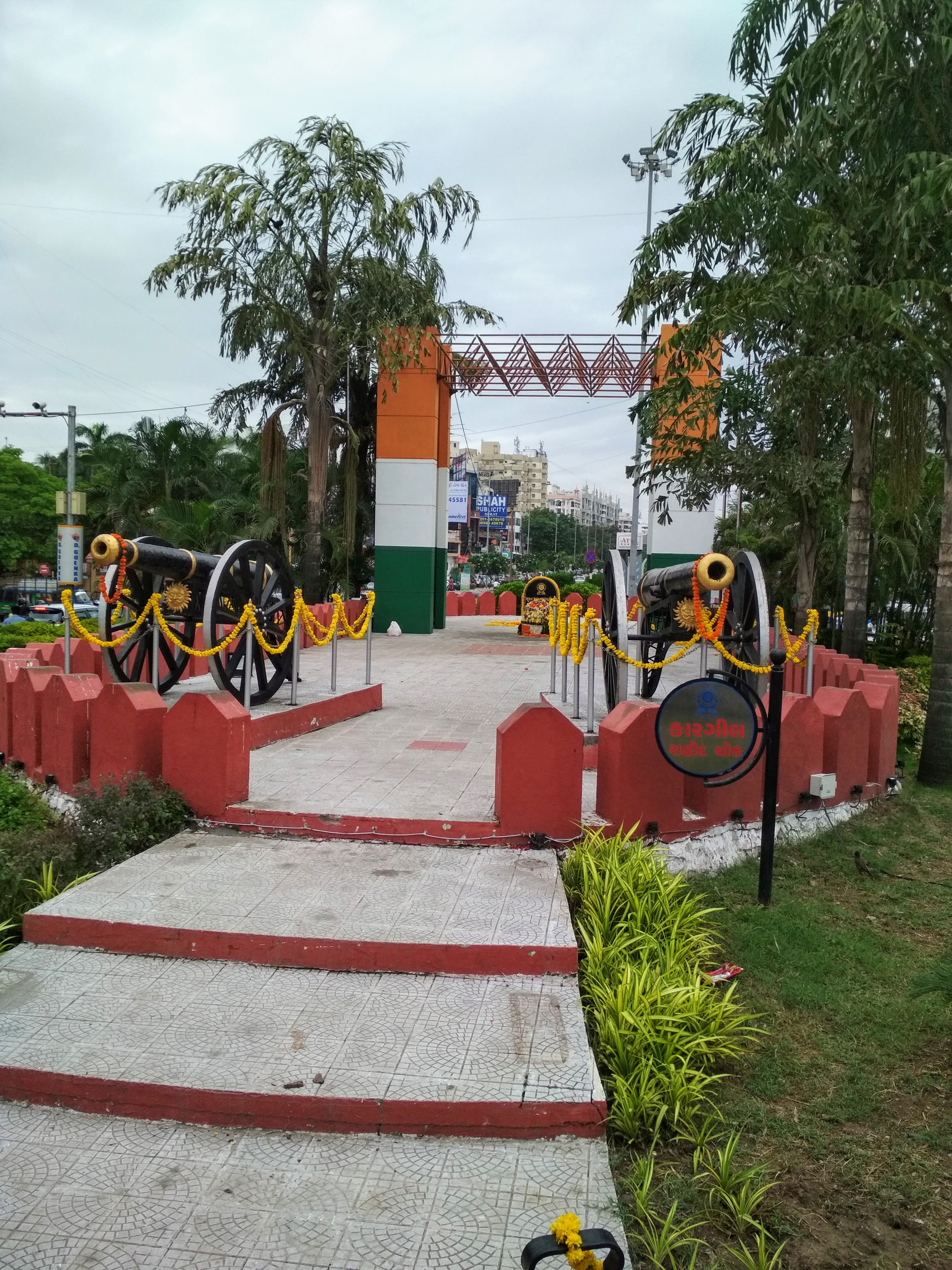
Kargil Chowk Circle

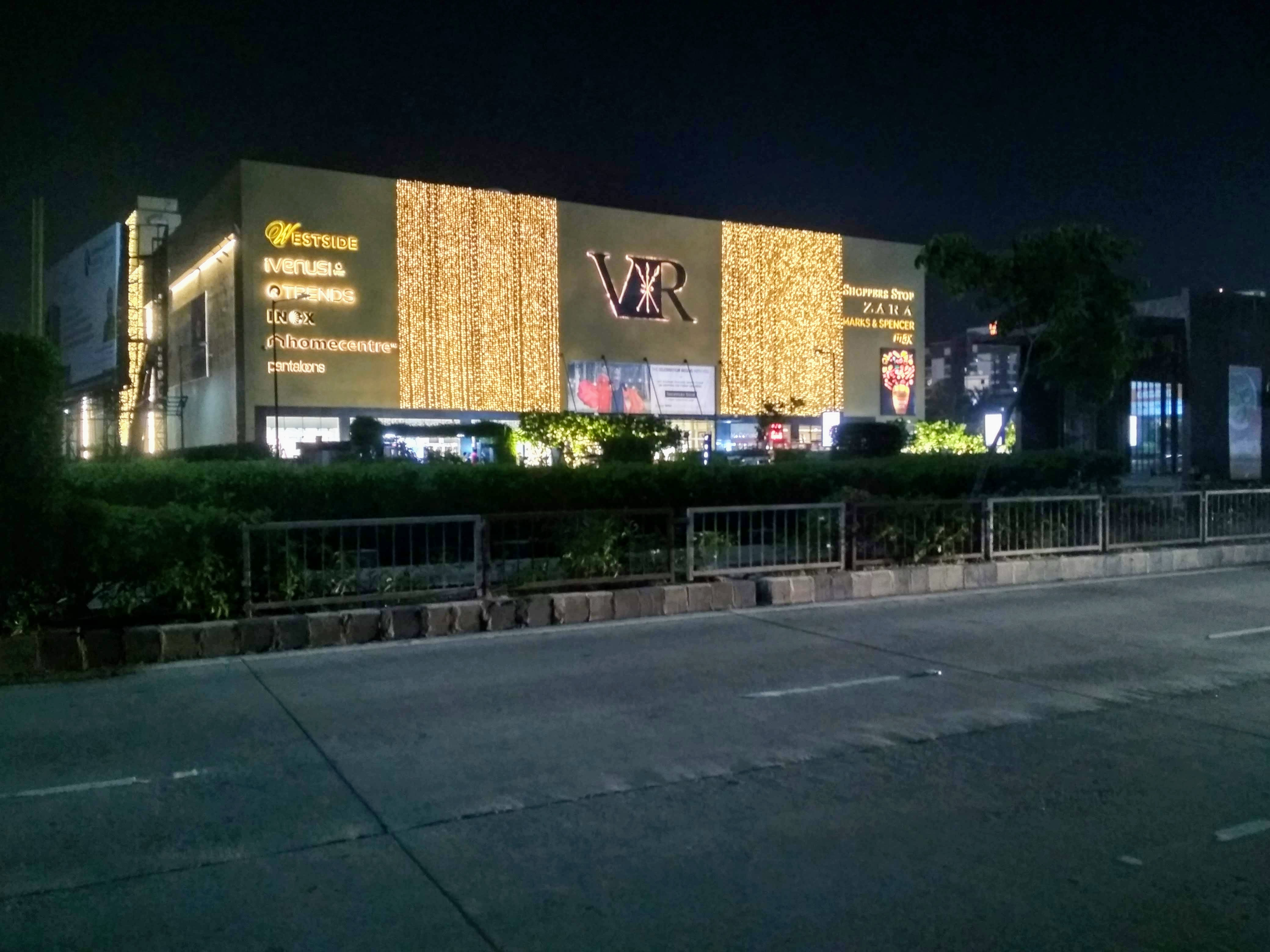
VR Mall Surat, Diwali Lighting

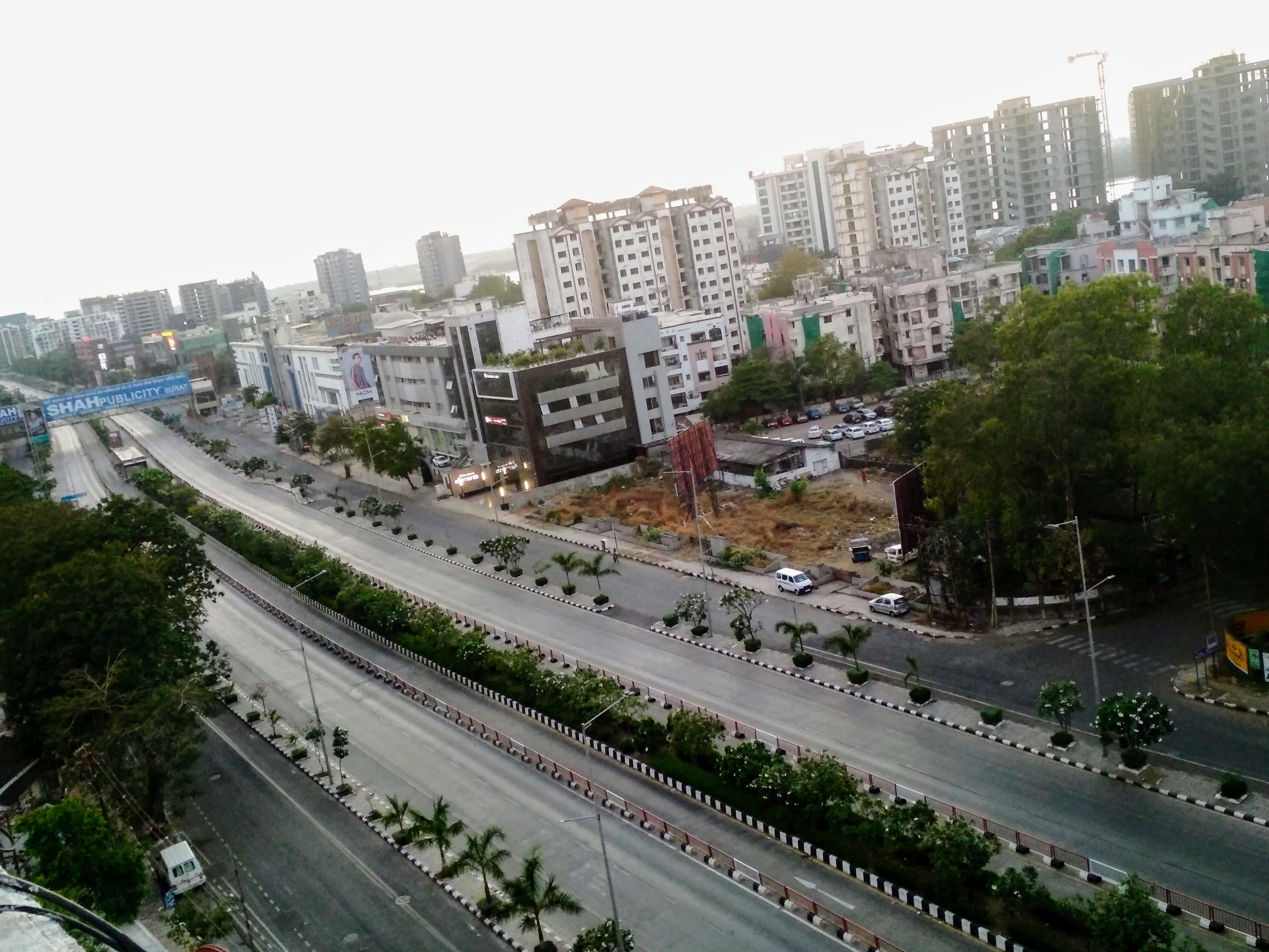
Gaurav Path, During COVID-19 Lockdown 2020

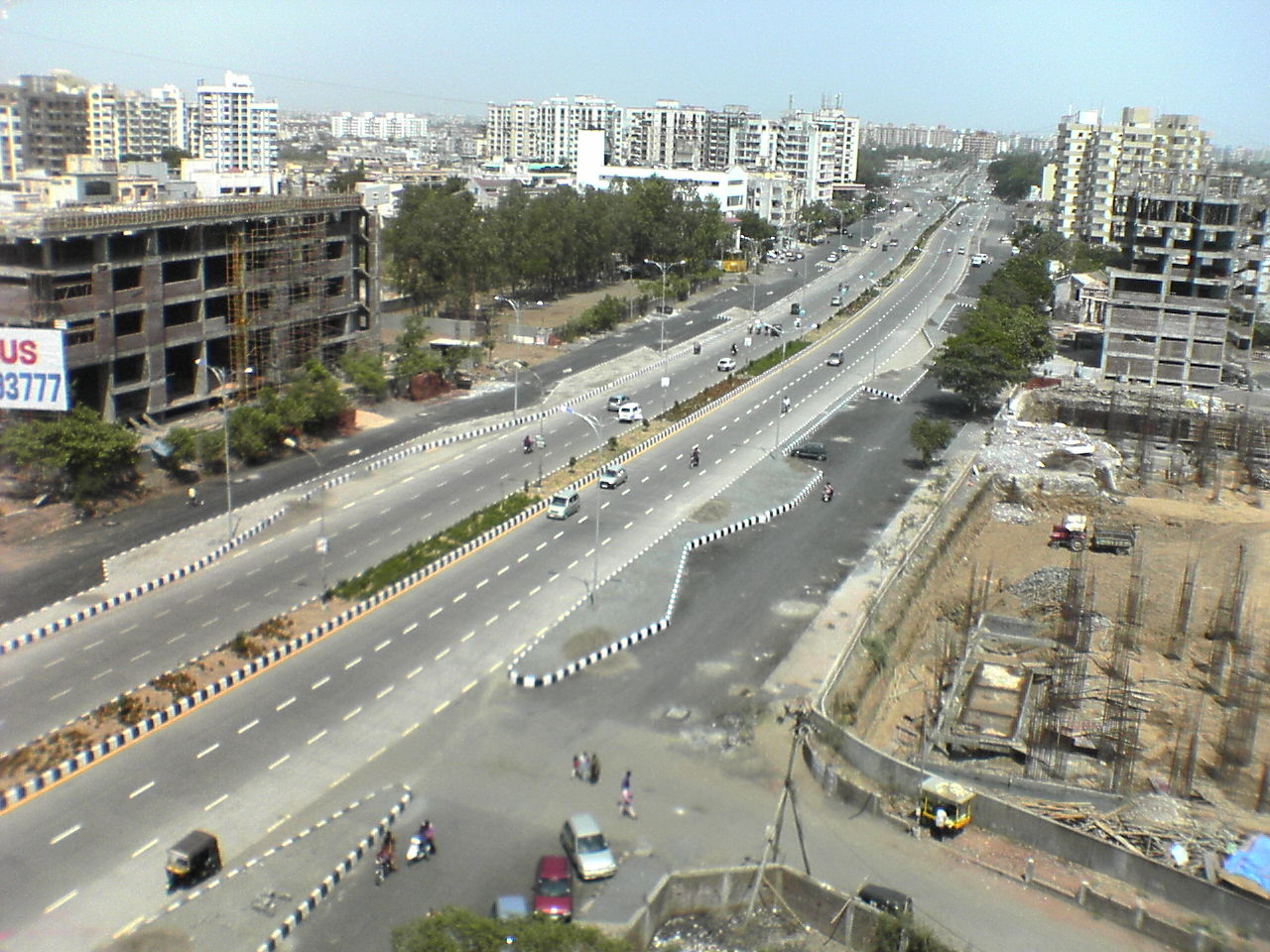

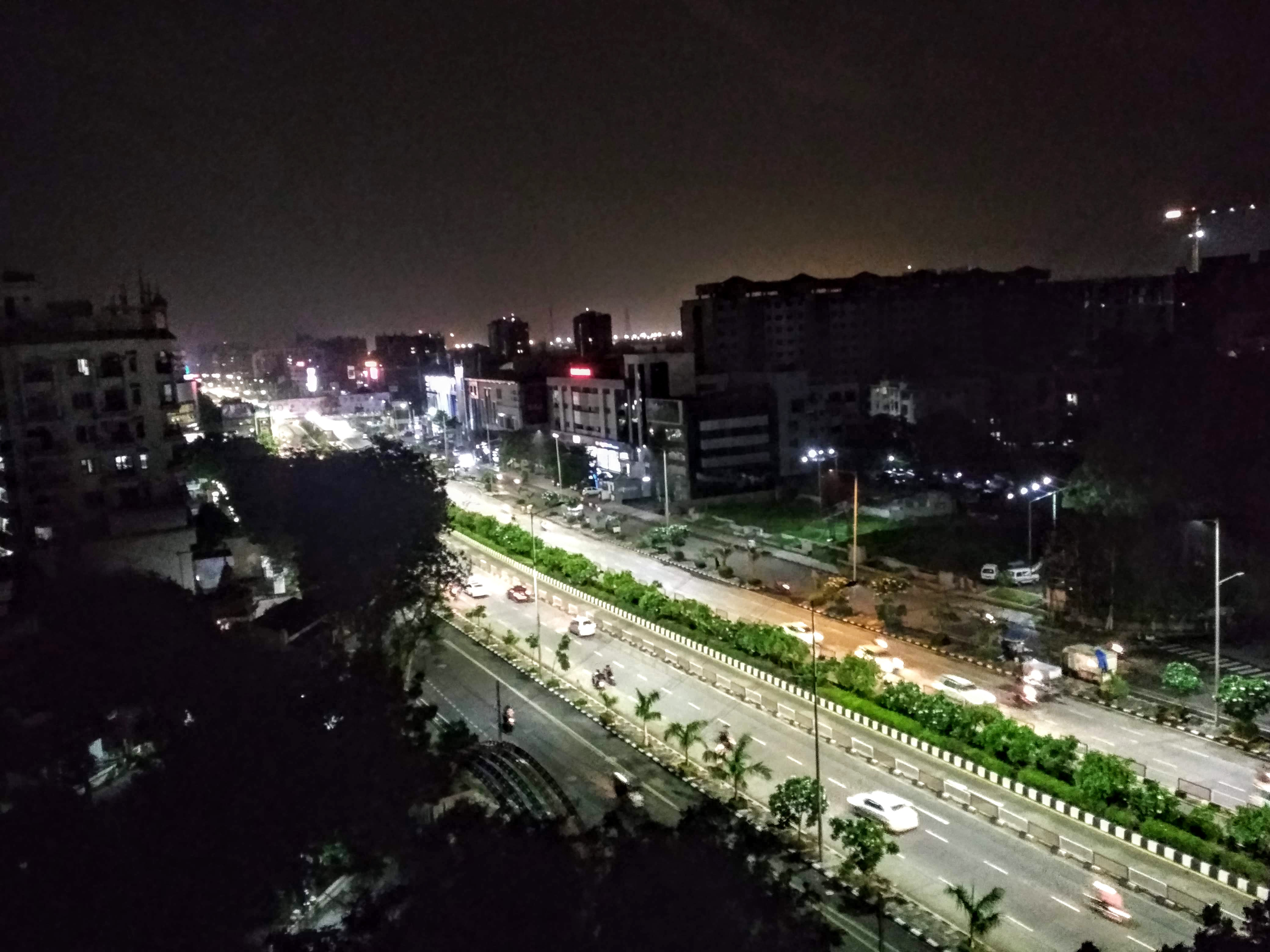
Gaurav Path at Night

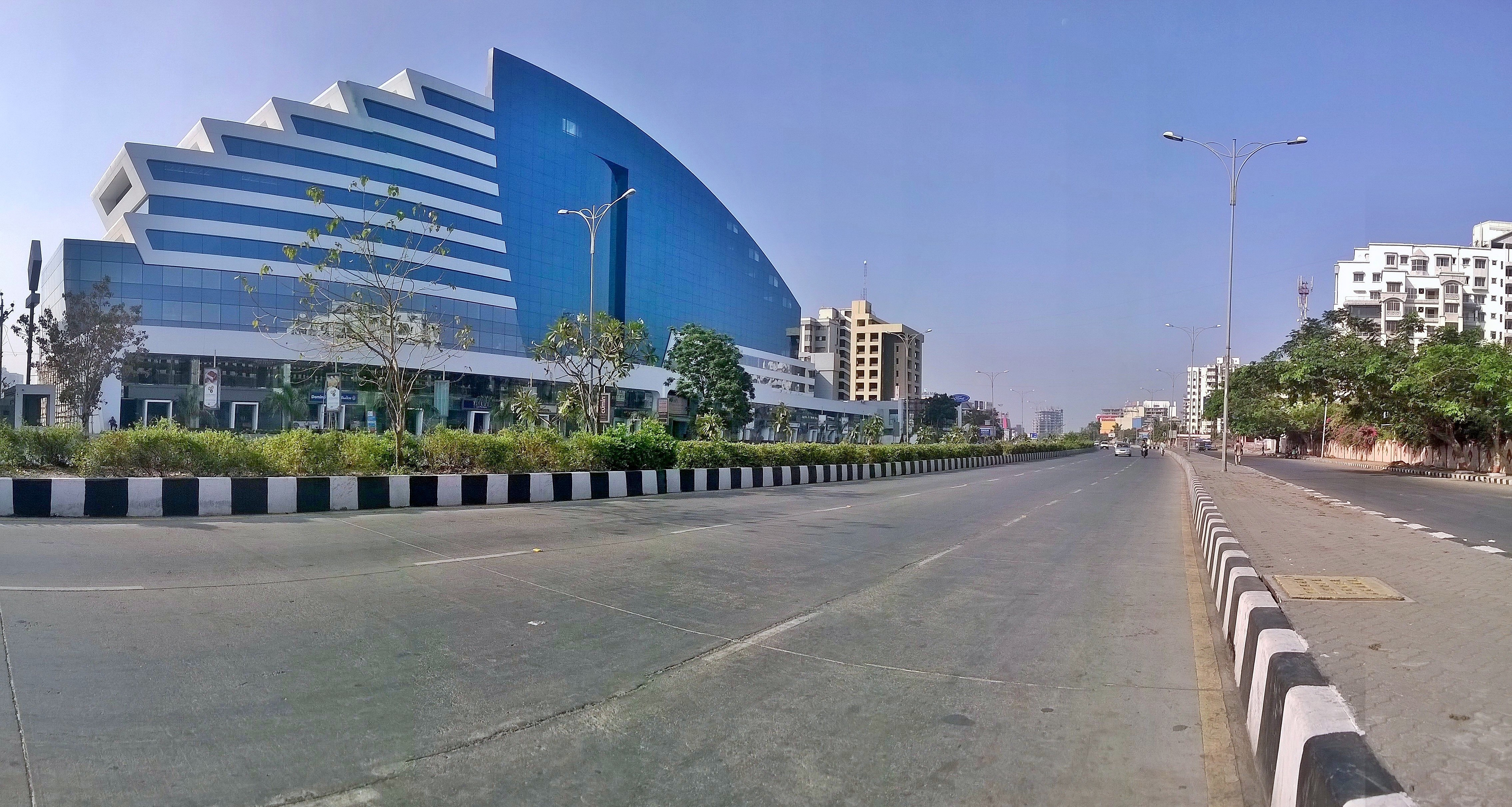
International Business Centre

== See also ==
List of tourist attractions in Surat
