= Poovanpara =

Village in Pathanamthitta District, Kerala, India

Poovanpara is a village in Pathanamthitta district, Kerala, India, 1 km from Konni, 11 km from Pathanamthitta and 13 km from Pathanapuram. Ebenezer Brethren Church, Assemblies of God in India, India Pentecostal Church of God, Salem Marthoma Church, SAS SNDP Yogam College, Konni, St Mary's English Medium School etc. are the traditional landmarks.

== Overview ==
Poovanpara falls in Muvattupuzha-Punalur highway. Rubber is the most important cash crop while banana, tapioca are other agricultural goods are grown. Poovanpara is noted for its extremely peaceful environment and a very high economic index and human development. Nearly everyone in Poovanpara is literate and has proficiency in Malayalam, English, Hindi and Tamil. A large number of migrants from different States of India live in Poovanpara. Poovanpara is also known for its regional fish market and meat market.

== Transportation ==
Main mode of transportation are the heavy network of Kerala State Road Transport Corporation buses and private buses.

== Notable Personalities ==
Vishnu Mohanan Nair, a theoretical physicist from SVNIT,Surat expert in nonlinear systems
