= National Institute of Technology, Meghalaya =

Public engineering institution in Meghalaya, India

Coordinates: 25.5738°N 91.8942°E

- Type: Institute of National Importance under The NIT Act of 2007, Public
- Established: 2010; 16 years ago
- Chairperson: Sunil Alagh
- Director: Pinakeshwar Mahanta (HAG; on deputation from IIT Guwahati)
- Location: Sohra, Meghalaya, India
- Website: nitm.ac.in

NIT Meghalaya administrative building

National Institute of Technology Meghalaya (NIT Meghalaya or NITM) is one of the National Institutes of Technology. It is located in Sohra, Meghalaya, India. The institute began to offer courses in 2010 at the Sardar Vallabhbhai National Institute of Technology, Surat.

== History ==
The institute is one of the 31 NITs in India, established as Institutions of National Importance with funding from India's Ministry of Human Resource Development.

The institute was set up by the Ministry of Human Resource Development in 2010 under the NIT Act. The foundation stone of NIT Meghalaya at Sohra (Cherrapunjee) was laid in October 2012 by then Union Minister for IT and Human Resource Development Kapil Sibal.

== Campus ==
Campus map of NIT Meghalaya

The institute operates from a temporary campus at the Bijni Complex in Laitumkhrah, Shillong, of the North Eastern Hill University.

The institute has been allotted a plot of land of about 300 acres (with another 73 acres planned to be added) at 25° 15' 22.00" N, 91° 44' 40.00" E in Sohra (Cherrapunjee) in the East Khasi Hills district of Meghalaya for its permanent campus. NIT Meghalaya proposes to construct a modern state-of-the-art campus to accommodate all its requirements so that logistics are minimized while the built structures are in harmony with the surroundings. The Union Ministry of Human Resource Development (HRD) has awarded the contract for construction of the permanent campus to the Central Public Works Department (CPWD). Phase I of constructions in Sohra campus which is expected to complete at the earliest by 2021 shall tentatively include the following:

=== Buildings ===
- 25,000 square meters in academic and administrative buildings
- Boys hostels for a capacity of 1500
- Girls hostel(s) for a capacity of 400
- 120 residences of various categories
- 150-room guest house
- Health centre
- 1500-capacity auditorium
- Indoor stadium

=== Utilities ===
- Power substation
- Reservoir for rainwater harvesting
- Water supply network
- Roads and drains
- Basic landscaping

The estimated expenditure in Phase I is about Rs. 300 crores.

== Academics ==
The institute admitted its first batch of B.Tech. students in July 2010, and the first two batches carried out their studies in the mentor institute, SVNIT Surat till December 2012. The academic activities of the institute in Meghalaya started in Shillong at the Bijni Complex of the North Eastern Hill University, in the city, with the admission of the third batch in July 2012.

Admission to the B.Tech. programmes is based on JEE (Main) conducted by the National Testing Agency (NTA) and through the counseling conducted by the Central Seat Allocation Board (CSAB).

M.Tech. course was started from 2014 session. The Doctor of Philosophy (Ph.D.) programme was started in August 2013.

MSc program in mathematics, chemistry and physics were launched in 2015 admission for which is done through JAM.

=== Rankings ===
University and college rankings

Engineering – India
- NIRF (2024): 68

NIT Meghalaya is ranked 68th among the engineering colleges of India by National Institutional Ranking Framework (NIRF) in 2024.

=== Central Library ===
The Central Library houses titles in Engineering, Technology, Sciences, Humanities and Social Sciences and Management. It has a collection of around 13,000 text and reference books and electronic resources. In addition to this, the library provides access to the Digital Library of ACM, IEEE and ASME.

== Departments ==
=== Civil Engineering (CE) ===
NIT Meghalaya's Civil Engineering department first began its session from July 2012. The department, with an intake capacity of 30 students, offers afour-year (eight semesters) B.Tech. programme in Civil Engineering.

Since 2014, the Civil Engineering Department has initiated the Ph.D. programme on Environmental and Structural Engineering to equip the students on environment safeguards and be competent on their know-how on safe and secure constructions in tune with the changing nature, including disasters such as earthquakes, drought and floods. Additionally, the department is planning to start an M.Tech. programme in the near future.

Currently, the department is offering common courses for first year students in Engineering Drawing and Environmental Science.

=== Computer Science & Engineering (CSE) ===
The department of Computer Science & Engineering, NIT Meghalaya offers B.Tech. degrees in Computer Science and Engineering discipline. This programme is perhaps the most popular in NIT Meghalaya, with a maximum intake of 30 students per year.

The department is actively involved in research activities.

The department started its MTech program from 2014 with an initial intake of 20. There is a PhD programme under which research scholars are admitted twice a year.

=== Electrical & Electronics Engineering (EEE) ===
The Department of Electrical Engineering started since the inception of NIT Meghalaya. It offers B.Tech., M.Tech. and PhD program. The B.Tech. program started in 2010 with an intake of 30 students and since 2014 onward M.Tech. program has been started with an intake of 20 students offering specialization in Power & Energy Systems.

There are full-time and part-time research scholars, registered for its PhD program.

The department aims to impart education and carry out fundamental and industry-oriented research. The research interest of faculties encompass areas of electrical engineering such as deregulated power system, soft computing application in power system control, voltage stability alleviation under deregulated environment, power electronics and drives, control system and instrumentation, mechatronics, embedded system, non-conventional energy system, high-voltage engineering, etc.

The department has laboratory facilities for students such as Electro-Technique Lab, Electrical Machine Lab, Network and Systems lab, Digital Electronics Lab, Power System Simulation Lab, Control & Instrumentation Lab, Power Electronics & Drives Lab, Microprocessor Lab, Microcontroller & Embedded Systems Lab. Specialised simulation software like Power Factory 14.1 (DIgSILENT), PSIM (Power Simulator), PSS@E (Power System Simulator for Engineers) are available with the department to develop the computing efficiency of the students and to carry out research.

=== Electronics & Communication Engineering (ECE) ===
The Department of Electronics and Communication Engineering caters to all areas of electronics engineering such as integrated electronics and circuits, telecommunications and computer technology. The department is equipped with laboratories catering to the basic training and research needs of its students.

The department offers Bachelor of Technology (B.Tech.) programme and has initiated a Ph.D. programme.

=== Mechanical Engineering (ME) ===
The Department of Mechanical Engineering opened in July 2013. The department offers a four-year (eight-semester) B.Tech. programme in Mechanical Engineering with an initial intake capacity of 30. From 2014, the department has started the PhD programme in the area of Design & Manufacturing in Mechanical Engineering, Application of Soft Computing Techniques in Machining, Computational Fluid Dynamics, Turbulence Modeling, Fluid Mechanics etc.

The department is planning to start M.Tech. programme in near future. It offers common courses for first year students in Engineering Mechanics, Basic Thermodynamics and Workshop Practice. The main objective of the department is to cater the students with class tutorial and in hand practice with state-of-the-art laboratories and workshop.

=== Humanities & Social Science ===
The Department of Humanities and Social Sciences hosts disciplines like English Language and Literature, European Literature in Translation, Classical Greek Literature, Abnormal Psychology, General Management, Marketing Management, Financial Management, Human Resource Management and Operations Management.

=== Physics ===
The Department of Physics was established in 2010. It has actively imparted education to the students of B.Tech. first and second years in theoretical aspects of areas along with related experiments to provide greater understanding of the subjects that would help them to become better engineers. The PhD programme in is successfully running in the domain of Material Science with special emphasis on Liquid Crystals, Metal Oxide semiconductors, Semiconductors nanostructure and devices and sensors. The department has an M.Sc. programme from the 2015-2016 session with special emphasis on the applied aspects of physics.

=== Chemistry ===
The Department of Chemistry started in 2012. In addition to a B.Tech. Chemistry course, the department is offering M.Sc. from 2015 onwards with all the major areas of Chemistry such as Inorganic, Organic, Physical, and Quantum Chemistry. It is offering PhD programs in broad area of chemical Sciences like Organic Chemistry, Inorganic Chemistry, Biophysical Chemistry, Materials Chemistry and Computational Chemistry.

=== Mathematics ===
The Department of Mathematics started in June 2012. Currently the department offers two-year M.Sc. and PhD programmes. In addition, the department plays an important role as a supporting department to B.Tech. and M.Tech. programmes of the institute.

== Student life ==
NIT Meghalaya organizes two major college fests—Cognitia, technical fest, and Shishir, cultural fest—in an academic year. Besides these, the college organizes sports fest.

There is a student council to preside student affairs which is elected through voting by students every year.

=== Hostels ===
NIT Meghalaya provides separate hostels for boys and girls to many of its outstation candidates. The hostels are provided with basic facilities. The hostels have internet facility. Adequate bus facility has been extended for commutates of students staying at hostels.

== See also ==
- Malaviya National Institute of Technology Jaipur
- National Institute of Technology, Manipur
- National Institute of Technology, Patna
- Sardar Vallabhbhai National Institute of Technology, Surat
