= Technical Education Quality Improvement Programme =

Technical Education Quality Improvement Programme (TEQIP)
- Country: India
- Ministry: Ministry of Education
- Launched: December 2002; 22 years ago
- Budget: ₹3,600 crore (US$410 million)

Technical Education Quality Improvement Programme is a project of Government of India assisted by World Bank. The project was implemented to improve the quality of education in the technical institutions of India.

== Funding ==
=== TEQIP Phase 1 ===
The Project was declared effective on March 12, 2003 and closed on March 31, 2009 (with an extension of 9 months). The total funds utilized at the end of the project (as on 30th June 2009) were ₹1,324.1182 crore (US$150 million) against the funds release of ₹1,331.8306 crore (US$150 million). Maharashtra was allotted the Highest in Project Life Allocation amounting to ₹162.5594 crore (US$19 million) out of which ₹161.2571 crore (US$18 million) was disbursed and Sardar Vallabhbhai National Institute of Technology, Surat was allotted the Highest in Project Life Allocation (in Centrally Funded Institutions+National Planning Implementation Unit Category) amounting to ₹22.93 crore (US$2.6 million) and entire amount was disbursed.
