= Dave Amer =

Canadian football player (born 1957)

Profile
- Position: Tight end

Personal information
- Born: September 22, 1957 (age 69)
- Listed height: 6 ft 4 in (1.93 m)
- Listed weight: 220 lb (100 kg)

Career information
- High school: Northern Secondary
- University: Simon Fraser
- CFL draft: 1982: 3rd round, 21st overall pick

Career history
- 1982: Calgary Stampeders

David Amer (born September 22, 1957) is a Canadian former professional football tight end who played for the Calgary Stampeders of the Canadian Football League. He was selected in the third round of the 1982 CFL draft by the Stampeders and went on to play five games professionally. Amer played college football for the Simon Fraser Clan.

== Early career ==
Amer played high school football at Northern Secondary School as a quarterback. As a senior in 1977, Amer led his team to the Toronto Secondary Schools Athletic Association (TSSAA) finals. He was selected to play in the 1978 Metropolitan Toronto all-star game, where he was voted the offensive player of the game. Amer also played rugby, winning the TSSAA championship game with the team in 1978. For his roles on both the Canadian football and rugby teams in the 1977–78 academic year, Amer was named Northern's male athlete of the year. He received an athletic scholarship to play college football at Simon Fraser University. Amer played a variety of positions with Simon Fraser, including quarterback, running back, and slotback.

== Professional career ==
Prior to the 1981 CFL draft, the Toronto Argonauts considered designating Amer as their territorial exemption pick. This didn't occur, and Amer was later drafted in the third round of the 1982 CFL draft by the Calgary Stampeders with the 21st overall pick. The Stampeders initially released Amer prior to the season opener, but he later returned and played in five regular season games in the 1982 season as a tight end. Amer caught two passes for 37 yards with the Stampeders.
