= SquadraCorse of the Politecnico di Torino =

(Italy) SquadraCorse
- Full name: SquadraCorse di Politecnico di Torino
- Base: Turin, Italy
- Team Manager: (Italy) Morgana Vanzini
- Chief Engineer: (Italy) Ermanno Giuliano
- Website: squadracorse.webflow.io

2025 Formula Student Season
- Race drivers: (Italy) Andrea Viola (Italy) Federico Carbone
- Current Model: SC24
- Chassis: Carbon Fibre Monocoque
- Motors: 4x Custom AMK 28 kW
- Tyres: Pirelli
- Electronics: Self-designed ECU, Battery Management System and sensor nodes

Formula Student World Championship
- Debut: 2005 Formula Student UK
- Latest race: 2015 Formula EHI
- Competitions competed: 10x Formula Student Italy; 8x Formula Student UK; 5x Formula Student Germany; 2x Formula EHI; 1x Formula Hybrid US; 1x Formula Student Austria; 1x Formula Student Spain; 1x Formula student Czech
- Competition victories: 2009, 2010 Formula EHI; 2010 Formula Hybrid US
- Awards: Tiberna award best frame 2005, 2008; Best Cost Report Award FSG 2008
- Current World Ranking (electric): 47nd (as of 2015-10-19)

SquadraCorse is a student racing team based in Turin Italy, The car is designed by students of the Politecnico di Torino. Since 2012 the team competes in the Formula SAE Electric, it has also competed in both the Formula SAE and SAE Hybrid. Inspiration has been taken from the Italian car builders, using red as the principal colour. The cars usually have a combination of red and black colours The most notable results are obtained in the hybrid class. Two consecutive first places in the Formula Electric and Hibrid Italy (EHI) starting from 2009 and another first place in the Formula Hybrid USA 2010.

== The Team ==
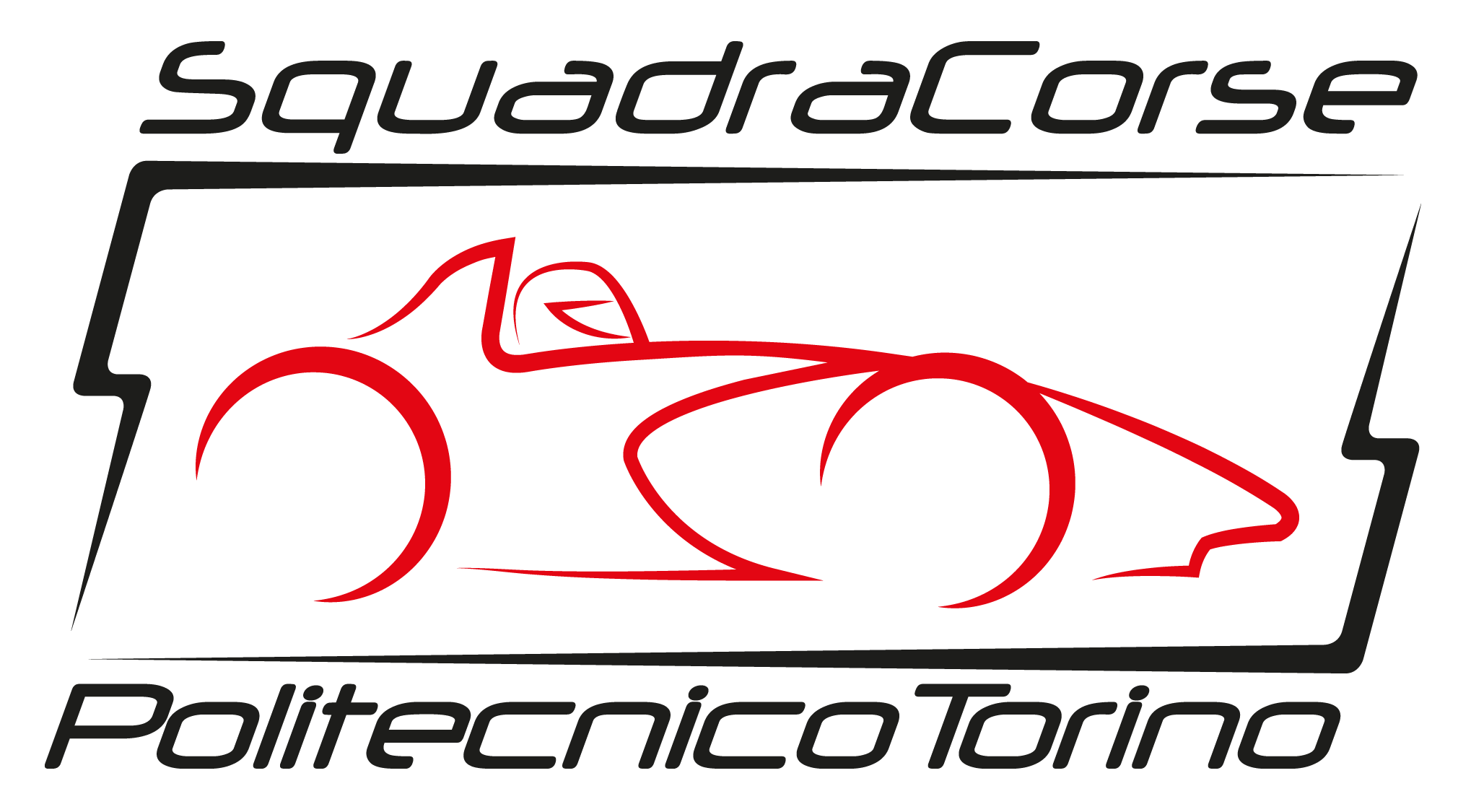
SquadraCorse Logo

The SquadraCorse, Italian for race team, consist of students from the Politecnico di Torino. The team consists of around 30 students from different faculties. They work together for a year, during this time, they create a race car, which is both fast and economical. By working on this project the students are exposed to a more practical form of learning, as they have to deal with the design of the car, manufacturing companies and public relation for the team.

== Cars ==
=== Combustion ===
==== SC05 ====
SquadraCorse was born in October 2003, the objective of the 9 original team members was to compete in the Formula SAE championship of 2005. The first car had a steel framework, which made it quite heavy, weighing in at 300 kg. It was powered by a V2 Guzzi engine, given it 61 hp. The students opted for a 5-speed sequential gearbox. In 2005 the SC05 competed in two events, namely the formula student UK and at the Balocco circuit in Italy. During second event it won the award for best Tiberna frame.

==== SC06 ====
During the 2006 season a reorganisation was initiated on the experiences of the previous year. The next car became lighter (250 kg) and the Guzzi V2 Engine was abandoned in favour of a 4-cylinder engine designed by Honda, which increased the power of the car to 71Hp. Other changes included a reduction of design time and the development of internal electronics. The SC06 to date is the only SquadraCorse one seater build without any red, as it raced with an unpainted green Kevlar body. During the Italian formula SAE event a ninth place was obtained by the team

==== SC07 ====
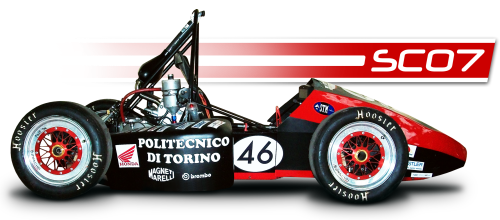
SC07

The SC07 was improved by lessening the weight and increasing both power and torque. It had 85Hp thanks to its 4-cylinder Honda engine, and weighted 240 kg. Due to the increase of power and decrease of weight it had a power to weight ratio of 2.82Hp/Kg. During the 2007 season the team competed in three races Silverstone, Fiorano and the new addition of the Formula Student Germany at the Hockenheim circuit. The car was painted once again in red, although with the addition of black. The SC07 became the first car of the team to reach a podium position, with a second place in the Formula SAE Italy. At the formula UK the car reached an eighteenth position.

==== SC08 ====
The most notable improvements of the SC08 were the introduction of carbon in the cockpit, custom magnesium wheels and gearbox controls on the steering wheel. The first event of the 2008 season was Silverstone were the Car was not ready yet to compete with the race leaders. The German circuit saw the improved version of the car, until the team has been forced to retire the car due to mechanical problems. The last event, Formula Student Italy, ended with a positive result, as the car finished in second place. Including receiving the Tiberina Best Chassis Award FSAE Italy.

==== SC09 ====
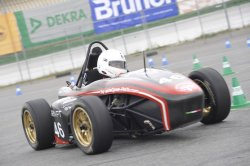
SC09

Due to changes in the safety regulations, most Europeans teams chose to change their framework, the designers chose to maintain the same frame as the previous years. Instead opting to create a complete carbon fibre cockpit for the first time. The SC09, a carbon car with painted red lines, had its first race at the German event. Unfortunately

during the driver change the car did not restart. The Italian race, held at the Riccardo Paletti circuit, had a better result as the car finished fifth overall.

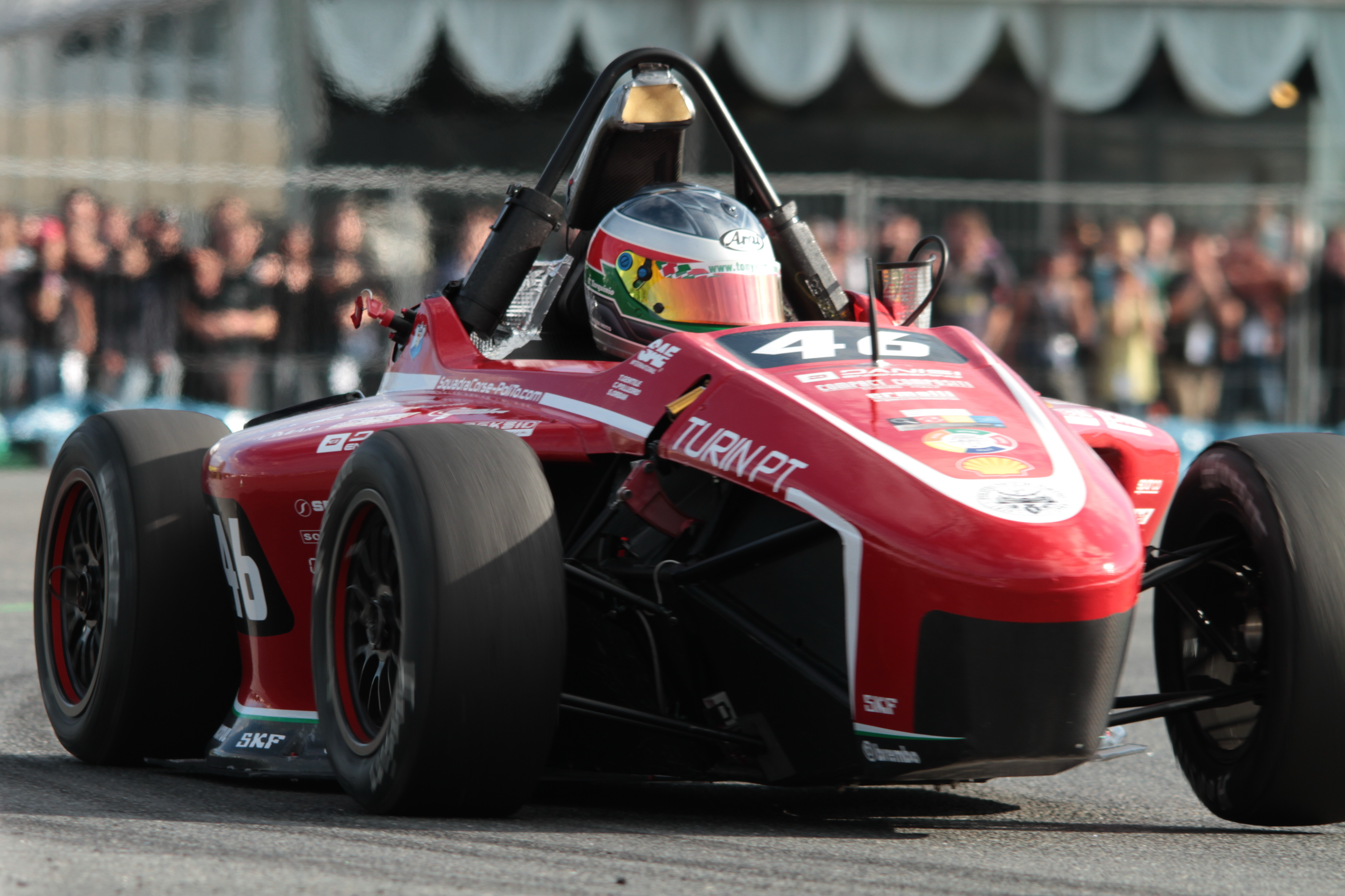
SCX

==== SCX ====
The 2010 season saw the emergence of the SCX, which was changed mainly due to the introduction of a pneumatic clutch. That allowed the team to develop an automatic transmission, an electronically controlled anti-slip differential. Another new feature was the complete carbon fibre impact attenuator. The first event resulted in the first top ten finish at an event outside of Italy, the Formula Student UK. The second race of the season saw an improvement of the position as the car reached a sixth overall position in the German event. The last course of the season was the Formula SAE Varano. There the SCX repeated the performance of the 2007 and 2008, finishing in second position.

==== SCXX ====
This season saw the arrival of the last car powered by a combustion engine, the SCXX, a direct evolution of the previous car. Notable changes were made on the electronics as on the process of collecting data both during and after the race. The car competed in the same events as the previous year. The best result was achieved in the Italian event with a fourth place. During the race in Germany the SCXX reached a sixteenth overall position.

=== Electric ===
==== SC12e ====
SquadraCorse decided to switch from the traditional combustion engine to a completely electric powered car. Two Magneti Marelli TMG was used as the electric engine. The car reached a top speed of 180 km per hour and 0-100 acceleration of 2.9 seconds. The car was the first of its kind in Italy, the change was made out of the interest of automotive companies in electric cars. Being the first of its kind the project received a lot of media attention in Italy, and it competed in two events in 2012. These were the formula SAE in Hungary and Varano, Italy, it reached a fifth position in Hungary and improved to a third position in Varano. It managed a 7th world ranking at the end of the season.

==== SCR ====
The SCR was created in 2013, it competed during both the 2013 and 2014 season. By designing a complete carbon fibre body, the team saved on weight and increased the stiffness of the car. The most visible change in design was the addition aerodynamic surface, which were designed in order to give the most down force against a certain amount of power. During the 2014 season it competed in events of UK, Czech republic and Varano.

==== SCXV ====
The team presented the SCXV, a new car using four outboard engines instead of the previous years in which two engines were used. Not only are the engines are completely outboard, also the gear change for each individual engine. In 2015 the car competed in the races of Austria, Spain and Varano. With the best result obtained a fifth place in Verano Italy. The SCXV will be improved in the 2016 season, the focus of the improvements will be on the creation of a drag reduction system

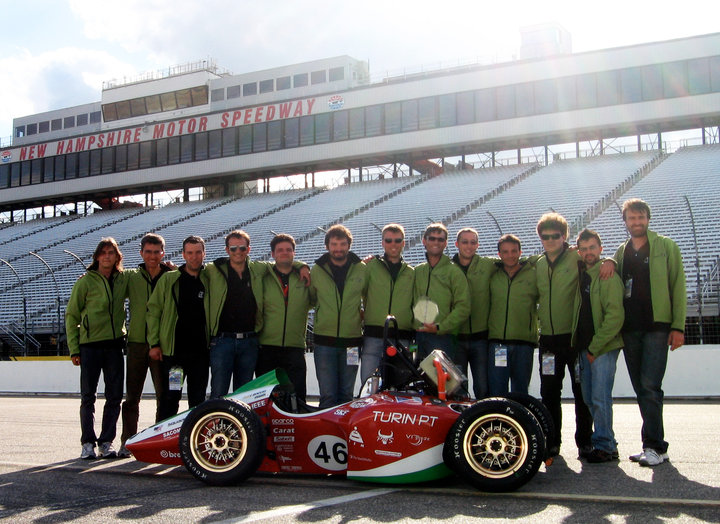
SquadraCorse with SC08H

==== SC17 ====
As usually, the team presented the latest car, the SC17, during the Rollout which is an event organized by Politecnico of Torino in order to launch the car of the current year before Formula SAE races. The SC17 has four outboard engine of 30kWp electric in wheel motors, a carbon fibre monocoque, Power to weight ratio of 1.47 kg/Hp, 0-100 acceleration of 2.9s and it's capable to reach more than 2g of lateral acceleration. In 2017 the car competed in the races of Italy, Czech Republic and Spain, gaining a third places in Italy. In 2018 the car will be re-made completely.

=== Hybrid ===
==== SC08H ====
In 2009 the SquadraCorse debuted in the Formula EHI with a modified version of the SC8 called the SC08H. This modified version was a hybrid car, having a 2-cylinder Kawasaki engine working in combination with a Perm pms electric engine. The first event the SC08H competed in was the Formula EHI or Electric and Hybrid Italy. In this event the SC08H achieved for the first time in the history of SquadraCorse the highest position on the podium. The following year the car competed in two more events, the Formula Hybrid USA and the Formula EHI 2010. In both races the obtained results remained the same as the previous year, a first position. Italian media took note of the first victories of the SquadraCorse
