= Kari Yli-Renko =

Canadian gridiron football player (born 1959)

Profile
- Position: Offensive lineman

Personal information
- Born: November 17, 1959 (age 66); Sudbury, Ontario, Canada
- Listed height: 6 ft 5 in (1.96 m)
- Listed weight: 271 lb (123 kg)

Career information
- College: Cincinnati
- NFL draft: 1982: 8th round, 222nd overall pick
- CFL draft: 1982

Career history
- 1983 1983–1985 1985 1985 1985–1987 1988–1992 1993: Chicago Blitz; New Jersey Generals; Baltimore Stars; Hamilton Tiger-Cats; Calgary Stampeders; Ottawa Rough Riders; Toronto Argonauts

Kari Yli-Renko (born November 17, 1959) is a former offensive lineman who played for four Canadian Football League teams from 1985 to 1993. Previously, he played three years in the United States Football League. He played college football for the Cincinnati Bearcats and was selected by the Cincinnati Bengals of the National Football League in the 1982 NFL draft.
