= Chris Schultz =

Canadian football player and sports commentator (1960–2021)

No. 66, 67
- Position: Offensive tackle

Personal information
- Born: February 16, 1960; Burlington, Ontario, Canada
- Died: March 4, 2021 (aged 61); Burlington, Ontario, Canada
- Listed height: 6 ft 8 in (2.03 m)
- Listed weight: 277 lb (126 kg)

Career information
- High school: Aldershot (Burlington)
- College: Arizona
- NFL draft: 1983: 7th round, 189th overall pick
- CFL draft: 1982: 1st round, 7th overall pick

Career history
- Dallas Cowboys (1983–1985); Toronto Argonauts (1986–1994)

Awards and highlights
- Grey Cup champion (1991); 2× CFL All-Star (1987, 1988); 3× CFL East All-Star (1987, 1988, 1991); Toronto Argonauts All-time team

Career NFL statistics
- Games played: 21
- Stats at Pro Football Reference
- Canadian Football Hall of Fame (Class of 2023)

Christopher Schultz (February 16, 1960 – March 4, 2021) was a Canadian professional football player who was an offensive tackle in the National Football League (NFL) and Canadian Football League (CFL). He primarily played with the CFL Toronto Argonauts. Schultz played college football at the University of Arizona. He was a sportscaster with Canadian sports television channel TSN.

== Early life ==
Schultz attended Aldershot High School in Burlington, Ontario, where he was a part of 2 football championships. He also practiced basketball.

He accepted a football scholarship from the University of Arizona. He was recruited by Arizona head coach Tony Mason as a defensive tackle.

As a redshirt freshman, he was named a starter at defensive tackle, where he played his first three years.

One of the strongest players on the team, he was converted into a left tackle as a senior, after the team experienced a rash of injuries on the offensive line.

In 2015, he was inducted into the Burlington Sports Hall of Fame. In 2016, he was inducted into the Ontario Sports Hall of Fame.

== Professional career ==
=== Dallas Cowboys ===
Schultz was selected by the Dallas Cowboys in the seventh round (189th overall) of the 1983 NFL draft. He was also selected by the Arizona Wranglers in the 1983 USFL Territorial Draft. As a rookie, he appeared in five games on special teams.

In 1984, he injured his right knee in the third preseason game against the Pittsburgh Steelers. On August 21, he was placed on the injured reserve list.

In 1985, Phil Pozderac injured his knee during the third game of the season, which opened the door for Schultz to start at left tackle, only to return to a backup role when Pozderac was healthy. He eventually regained the starting position from the thirteenth game until the playoffs, but struggled while playing against the Los Angeles Rams. He appeared in 16 games with 8 starts. He was waived on August 26, 1986.

=== Toronto Argonauts ===
In 1986, Schultz returned to Canada to play for the Toronto Argonauts of the Canadian Football League (CFL), who owned his rights after drafting him in the first round of the 1982 CFL draft.

He played in 124 games for the Argos over his nine-year career. Schultz was named a CFL All-Star twice (1987, 1988), appeared in the Grey Cup in 1987 and was a member of the 1991 Grey Cup championship team.

In 2007, he was named to the Argonauts All-time team.

== Broadcasting career ==
Schultz was a CFL football sportscaster on The Sports Network from 1998 to 2017. He also co-hosted a weekly one-hour sports radio program on TSN 1050 in Toronto, called Football Sunday with Mike Hogan during the CFL and NFL seasons. He was also the NFL Insider for TSN.

Schultz was announced as a member of the Canadian Football Hall of Fame 2023 class on March 16, 2023, in the media wing.

== Personal life ==
Schultz died of a heart attack on March 4, 2021, at the age of 61.
