= Polytechnic University of Turin =

Technical university in Turin, Italy

Coordinates: 45°03′47.14″N 7°39′39.87″E

- Politecnico di Torino
- Other name: PoliTo
- Former names: Scuola di Applicazione per gli Ingegneri, Regio Politecnico di Torino
- Type: Public and Technical University
- Established: 1859; 167 years ago
- Affiliations: ESDP, TIME, CLUSTER, PEGASUS, NEREUS, CESAER, EUA, EASN, UNITE!, SEFI, UNIMED, EURECOM, COLUMBUS
- Budget: €308.8 million (2022)
- Rector: Stefano Corgnati
- Academic staff: 983 (2018/2019)
- Administrative staff: 889 (2018/2019)
- Students: 34,721 (2019/2020)
- Undergraduates: 20,889 (2019/2020)
- Postgraduates: 13,832 (2019/2020)
- Doctoral students: 696 (2018/2019)
- Location: Turin, Italy
- Campus: at least 315,000 square metres (3,390,000 sq ft); Urban, multiple sites
- Sports teams: CUS Torino, PoliTo Sport
- Colors: Prussian Blue
- Website: http://www.polito.it

The Polytechnic University of Turin (Italian: Politecnico di Torino, abbreviated as PoliTo) is the oldest Italian public technical university. The university offers several courses in the fields of Engineering, Architecture, Urban Planning and Industrial Design.

The Polytechnic University of Turin has its main campuses in Turin, in the Piedmont region, where the majority of the research and teaching activities are located, as well as other satellite campuses in four other cities across the Piedmont and Aosta Valley regions. With eleven departments and several research institutes, it has around 35,000 students (undergraduate and postgraduate) and 1,800 employees (teaching, research, support and management staff). The university was established in 1859 as a Technical School for Engineers. The school expanded its research and education curriculum over time, becoming a polytechnic school in 1906. Politecnico di Torino is a member of several university federations, including the TIME, CESAER, and PEGASUS.

== History ==
The Regio Politecnico di Torino (Royal Polytechnic University of Turin) was established in 1906. The present-day institution was preceded by the Scuola di Applicazione per gli Ingegneri (Technical School for Engineers), which was founded in 1859 in application of the Casati law, and the Museo Industriale Italiano (Italian Industry Museum) founded in 1862 by the Ministry of Agriculture, Trade and Industry. The Technical School for Engineers was part of the University, which led to technical studies being accepted as part of higher education. In those times Italy was about to begin a new industrial era, which the Industry Museum was to address more directly thanks to famous scholars and researchers dealing with new subjects such as electrotechnics and building science. The new school was deeply concerned with the needs of the Italian society and its development perspectives.

Like other well known Polytechnic Schools in the first years of the 20th century the Regio Politecnico di Torino had several goals and began contacting the European academic world and the Italian industry. Aeronautics began as a subject. Students from all over Italy came to Turin and found in the new laboratories built for the study of various subjects ranging from chemistry to architecture in a positive and helpful atmosphere. Subsequently, the Faculty of Engineering was transferred to a building, now disappeared, which occupied the entire block between via Giolitti, via San Francesco da Paola, via Cavour and via Accademia Albertina (the current Valdo Fusi square). During the Second World War, the plexus was severely damaged, and largely razed to the ground by a heavy bombing by the Royal Air Force, in the night between 8 and 9 December 1942.

Instead of rebuilding the Faculty of Engineering where it was, it was decided to move it and expand it in the Crocetta district, and in November 1958 a large complex of buildings located in Corso Duca degli Abruzzi was inaugurated in the vast area where the Turin Stadium had been built in 1911. The historical headquarters of Valentino Castle (Castello del Valentino) helped expanding the volume and the facilities given in 1859 to the Technical School for Engineers.

In the 1990s, new teaching campuses were opened in Alessandria, Biella, Mondovì, and Verrès. On 13 February 2012, the e-st@r, a small artificial satellite built to the standards of the CubeSat (nanosatellite cube) by the students of the Polytechnic of Turin, was carried into orbit by Vega, the pitcher of the European Space Agency.

== Campuses ==
Campuses of the Politecnico di Torino draw inspiration from the structure of Anglo-Saxon ones, with multipurpose buildings for teaching, basis and applied research and services to the students in Turin, and a regional network of technological centers (Alessandria, Biella, Mondovì, Verrès), dedicated to research activities, technological transfer, specialist education and services to the region.

The historical and representative base of the Politecnico is in the town, on the River Po: the Valentino Castle, a House of Savoy of the 17th Century. It is the main teaching campus for Architecture and has an area of 23.000 sq. m. The big complex in corso Duca degli Abruzzi – with 122.000 sq. m., the main campus of Engineering – was opened in 1958 and it is completed by the Cittadella Politecnica: a modern complex of 170,000 sq. m. adjoining to the main building, including areas dedicated to students, research activities, technological transfer and services. The newest campus is the Design and Sustainable Mobility Citadel, in an area adjoining to the manufacturing establishment of Mirafiori, FIAT manufacturing facility which has been remodeled as well as the Lingotto building, which hosts the Master School. The headquarters on Oddino Morgari street is intended for the course in territorial, urban and landscape-environmental planning.

=== Museum ===
The Museo Archivio Politecnico (MAP) carries out historical documentation activities for the University and for scholars who intend to carry out research and studies on the development of Turin's polytechnic culture, as well as the events that over the years have involved technical institutions and industry in Turin, Piedmont and Italy. The museum preserves and manages the historical materials of the University, such as: the historical archive of the students of the Polytechnic and a specialized library on the history of engineering, architecture and related institutions. It also carries out activities for the dissemination of scientific and technological culture with exhibitions, workshops and conferences.

== Academics ==
=== Statistics ===
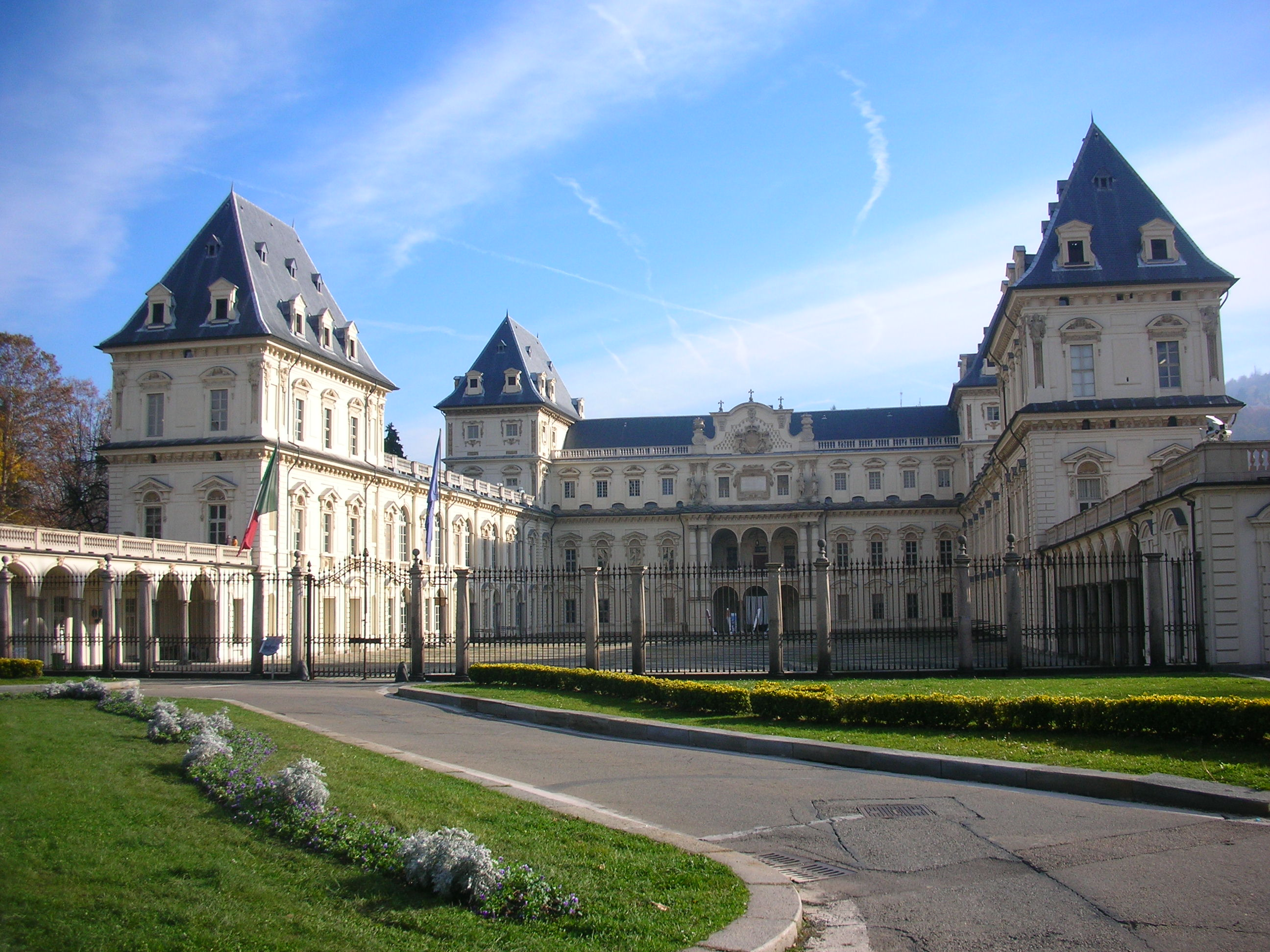
School of architecture: Castello del Valentino

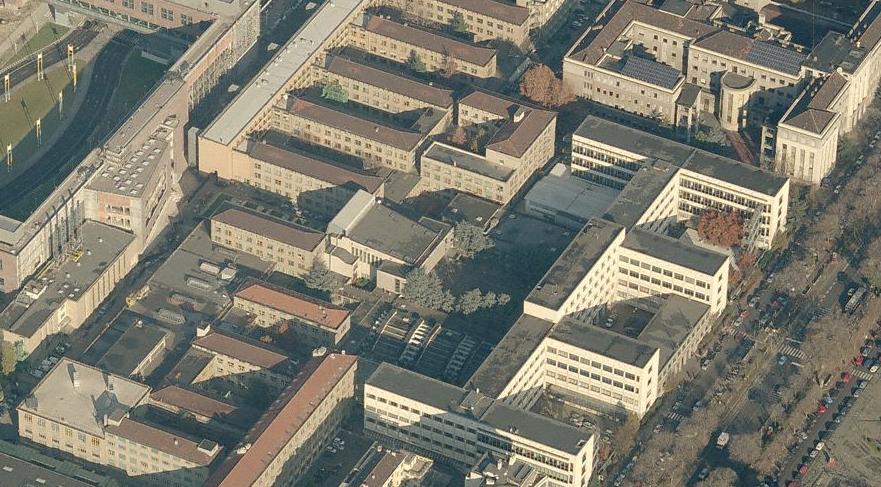
The campus

Students statistics (A.Y. 2018–2019)

- 35,700 Bachelor's and Master's students
- 52% Italian students from outside Piedmont
- 16% international students
- 5,300 first year students
- 565 Specializing Master's students
- 696 PhD candidates

Course catalog (A.Y. 2019–2020)

- 23 Bachelor's degree programmes (3 in Architecture, Design and Spatial Planning, 19 in Engineering and 1 Professional Bachelor's degree programme)
- 30 Master's degree programmes (6 in Architecture and 24 in Engineering)
- 23 Courses completely taught in English
- 5 I level Specialization Masters
- 17 II level Specialization Masters
- 16 PhD programmes, including 5 in cooperation with other universities (3) and research centres (2)

Graduates statistics in 2018

- 6,691 graduates
- 3,495 Bachelor's degree graduates (Average age: 23,7)
- 3,196 Master's degree graduates (Average age 26,2)

Employment rate of second cycle (Master) students one year after graduation (Almalaurea 2021 survey): 87.5%, above the national average of 70.7%.

=== Departments ===
The university is structured in 11 departments that deal with both teaching and research. Departments carry out duties of coordination, promotion of research, organization and management of the teaching activity, following the recent reform of the University system. The departments are:

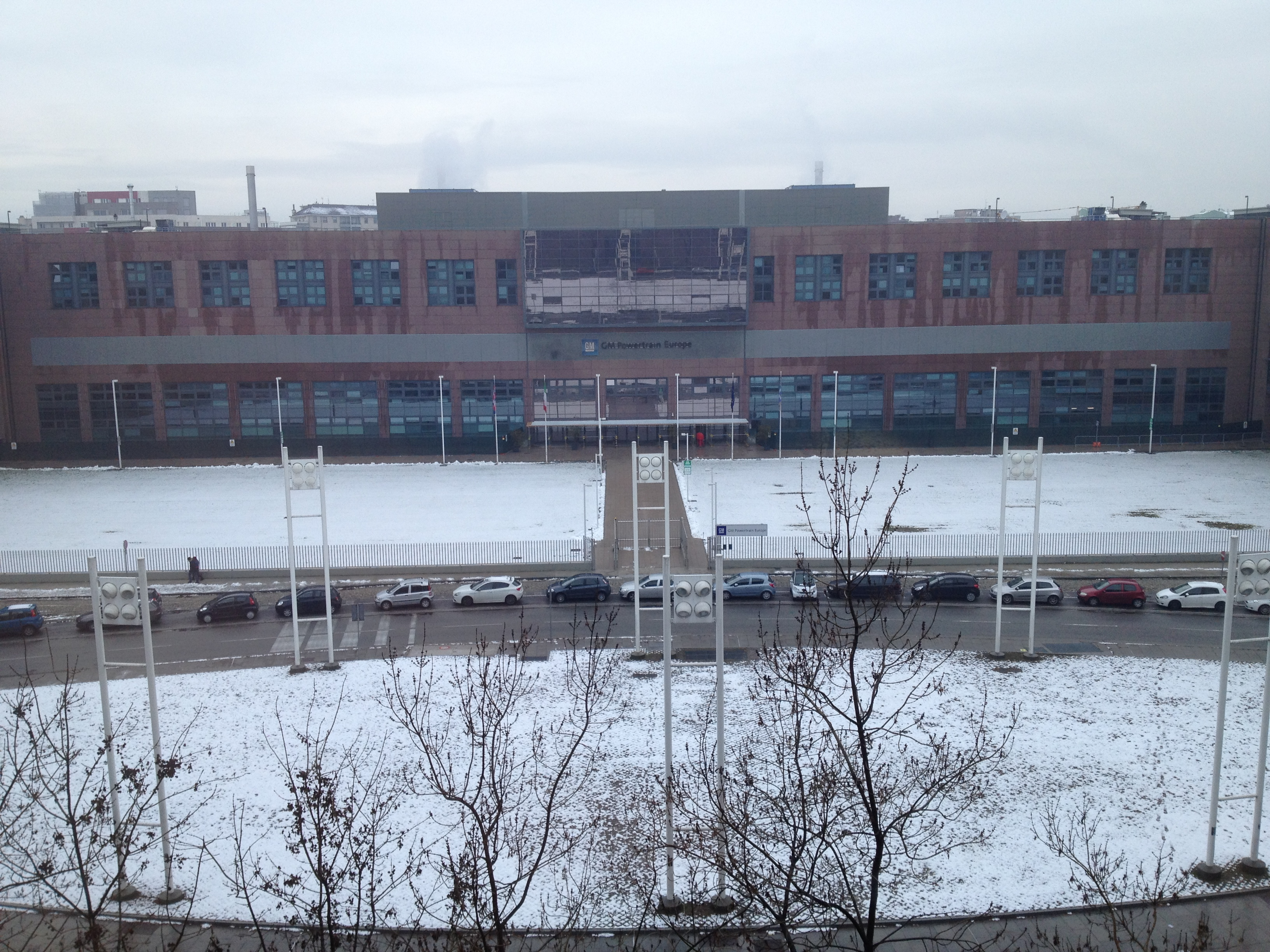
General Motors Powertrain Europe: A research facility within the school involved in hybrid and diesel engine development

- DAD – Department of Architecture and Design
- DAUIN – Department of Control and Computer Engineering
- DENERG – Department of Energy
- DET – Department of Electronics and Telecommunications
- DIATI – Department of Environment, Land and Infrastructure Engineering
- DIGEP – Department of Management and Production Engineering
- DIMEAS – Department of Mechanical and Aerospace Engineering
- DISAT – Department of Applied Science and Technology
- DISEG – Department of Structural, Geotechnical and Building Engineering
- DISMA – Department of Mathematical Sciences
- DIST – Interuniversity Department of Regional and Urban Studies and Planning

=== Rankings ===
University rankings

Global – Overall
- QS World: 206 (2027)

Global – Science and engineering
- QS Engineering & Tech.: 53 (2026)

Into the 21st century, Politecnico di Torino is consistently ranked as one of the best universities in Italy and in Europe, and as of 2024 it is ranked by QS World University Rankings among the top 52 engineering and technology universities in the world, with many rankings by subject in the world's top 20 and 30. In particular, according to QS Top Universities Ranking 2024, Politecnico di Torino ranked 28th in the world for Mechanical Engineering, 22nd in the world for Petroleum Engineering, 21st in the world for Architecture and 33rd in the world for Civil Engineering.

The university's Innovative Enterprise and Business Incubator 'I3P' was ranked in 2014 as the 5th best in Europe and 15th overall in the world by UBI Index Politecnico Di Torino is the top national recipient of research funding from the Fondo di Finanziamento Ordinario. The Automotive Engineering program, conceived in collaboration with Fiat Group, has been consistently ranked among the top three in Europe for the past ten years.

=== Internationalization ===
The Polytechnic University of Turin has been awarded the title "European University" by the European Commission. Together with 6 other European technical universities, the Polytechnic University of Turin has formed the alliance UNITE! (University Network for Innovation, Technology and Engineering). The aim of the project is to create a trans-European campus, to introduce trans-European curricula, to promote scientific cooperation between the members and to strengthen knowledge transfer between the countries. The alliance includes the Technische Universität Darmstadt, the Aalto University, the KTH Royal Institute of Technology, the Polytechnic University of Turin, the Polytechnic University of Catalonia and the University of Lisbon.

Politecnico di Torino has an agreement with the Turin Polytechnic University in Tashkent, Uzbekistan. There Politecnico di Torino prepares students in the field of Mechanical Engineering, Mechatronics (only Master of Science, but the course was closed in 2015), Computer science and Civil engineering.

=== Courses ===
The main courses offered are architecture, architectural engineering, industrial design, aerospace engineering, automotive engineering, biomedical engineering, chemical engineering, civil engineering, computer engineering, electrical engineering, electronic engineering, environmental engineering, energy engineering, engineering physics, material engineering, mechanical engineering, mechatronics, mining engineering, nuclear engineering, nanotechnology, production engineering, petroleum engineering, telecommunications engineering and textile engineering.

== Research ==
Research activities, in particular, are structured in four macro-areas: Industrial Engineering; Information Technology; Management and Mathematical Engineering; Civil, Environmental, Architecture and Design Engineering.

=== Research alliances ===
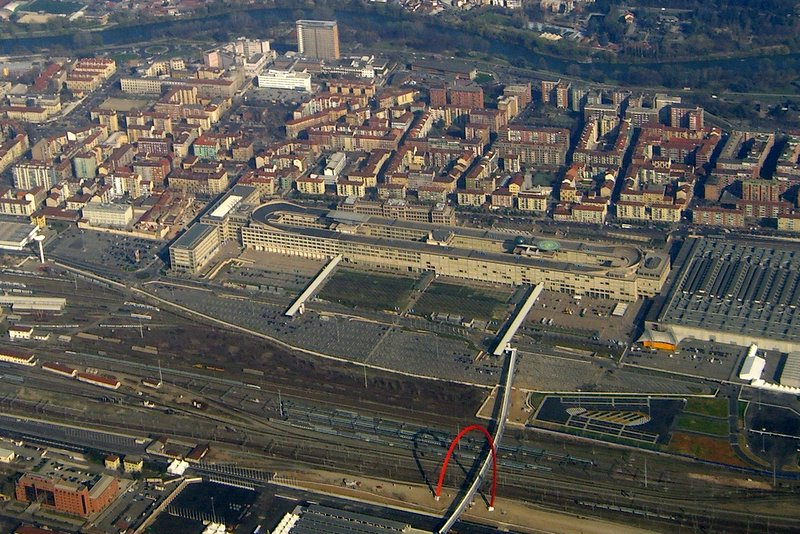
FIAT-Lingotto

The Polytechnic has research links with local and international companies, reaching about 700 yearly research contracts with firms such as EthosEnergy, Thales Alenia Space, Intel, Motorola, Compaq, Ferrari, Fiat, Leonardo, General Motors, TIM, Freescale, Vishay, Avio, Agusta, IBM, Microsoft, Nokia, Pininfarina, Bosch, General Electric, STMicroelectronics and European Space Agency.

== Networks ==
The Politecnico di Torino is a member of

- CLUSTER (Consortium Linking Universities of Science and Technology for Education and Research) which is a network of leading European Universities of Technology
- European Network for Training and Research in Electrical Engineering
- Top International Managers in Engineering (TIME) network
- European Spatial Development Planning (ESDP) network.
- University Network for Innovation, Technology and Engineering (UNITE!)

== Student life ==
At Politecnico di Torino tuition fees vary depending on each student's family income (ISEE form) and usually they increase if the student is late with its studies. Fees range between about 161 €/year and 3821 €/year. Students with a family income (ISEE) lower than 25.500 €/year are part of the "no-tax area" and pay 161 €/year. A large number of students benefit from fees reductions, including international students. Piedmont's public education service (EDISU Piemonte) which manages additional scholarships, student housing, libraries, lending of computers, cafeterias and study spaces. All the university campuses are covered by a Wi-Fi network, connected and interoperable with the Eduroam service.

=== Associations ===
Politecnico di Torino hosts many students' associations, including international students associations. As of 2022, there are 29 registered associations, some of these are:

- AESA Torino (Aerospace Engineering Students' Association), a non-profit organization which organises conferences and guided tours related to the aerospace field.
- J.E.To.P. - Junior Enterprise Torino Politecnico, a non-profit organization that operates ad a web agency.
- PoliENERGY, a non-profit organization related to sustainability, innovation and energy.
- ERASMUS TORINO, a non-profit organization, gathering exchange students and encouraging exchange projects
- Mu Nu chapter of IEEE-Eta Kappa Nu, a collegiate chapter of IEEE-Eta Kappa Nu (ΗΚΝ), the honor society for IEEE.

=== Teams ===
There are more than 30 active student teams at Politecnico, where students can work together on different projects, enriching their cultural, technical and managerial knowledge. Some of these are:

- 2WheelsPoliTO, a team in which students design and build a racing motorcycle that every two years races on the MotoGP circuit of Aragon (Spain).
- PoliTo Rocket Team, a rocket engineering student team dedicated to the design and construction of sounding rockets and rocket engines, which competes at the International Rocket Engineering Competition and at the European Rocketry Challenge.
- Squadra Corse, a student team devoted to designing and constructing an electric racing prototype to compete in Formula SAE and Formula Hybrid.
- CubeSat Team, a student team involved in the design and development of small satellites and space platforms.
- DIANA, a student team which works on robotics and the production of model of rovers.

=== Student politics ===
Students at the university elect representatives in the Academic Senate, the Board of Directors and in the Boards of Schools. Currently, there are three main political groups in student elections, which are also recognized student's associations:

- Alter.POLIS, an independent left-wing organization.
- Obiettivo Studentesco, generally considered as a Christian democratic organization.
- RUN Polito, a centre-left organization, nationally confederated with Primavera degli Studenti.

There are also other smaller groups which includes extremist groups, such as fascist and communist student unions. Participation in student elections is generally low.

== Notable alumni ==
- Guido Chiarelli
- Ettore Cordiano
- Corradino D'Ascanio
- Carlo De Benedetti
- John Elkann
- Galileo Ferraris
- Dante Giacosa
- Chiara Marletto
- Edoardo Molinari
- Paola Navone
- Bruno Sacco
- Adriano Olivetti
- Cesare Paolini
- Vilfredo Pareto
- Francesco Profumo
- Ettore Sottsass
- Emma Strada
- Amedeo M. Turello
- Pier Giorgio Frassati

== See also ==
- European Spatial Development Planning
- List of Italian universities
- Top International Managers in Engineering
- Turin Polytechnic University in Tashkent
