= HMS Nereus =

Three ships of the Royal Navy have borne the name HMS Nereus, after the Greek deity Nereus:

- HMS Nereus (1809), a 32-gun frigate that served between 1809 and 1817
- HMS Nereus (1821), a 46-gun modified Leda-class frigate that was never commissioned and served as a store ship until 1879
- HMS Nereus (1916), an Admiralty M-class destroyer launched in 1916 and sold for breaking up in 1921

== See also ==
- Nereus (disambiguation)
