= 1982 CFL draft =

Canadian football draft

The 1982 CFL draft composed of six rounds where 72 Canadian football players were chosen from eligible Canadian universities and Canadian players playing in the NCAA. A total of 18 players were selected as territorial exemptions, with every team making at least one selection during this stage of the draft.

== Territorial exemptions ==
Toronto Argonauts Geoff Townsend TB Boston College

Toronto Argonauts Stephen Delcol DT Simon Fraser

Montreal Concordes Luc Tousignant QB Fairmont State

Calgary Stampeders Ken Moore TE Hawaii

Calgary Stampeders Greg Peterson DB Brigham Young University

Calgary Stampeders Kevin Molle OL Fresno State

Saskatchewan Roughriders Brent Molnar OL Minot State

British Columbia Lions Dennis Guevin OT Simon Fraser

British Columbia Lions Gerald Roper G Arizona

Winnipeg Blue Bombers Milson Jones TB North Dakota

Winnipeg Blue Bombers Stan Mikawos DT North Dakota

Hamilton Tiger-Cats Kari Yli-Renko T Cincinnati

Ottawa Rough Riders Mark Seale DT Richmond

Ottawa Rough Riders Kevin Dalliday G/DT Carleton

Ottawa Rough Riders Ron St. Poulton DB McGill

Edmonton Eskimos Nereo Bolzon LB Alberta

Edmonton Eskimos Peter Eshenko WR Alberta

Edmonton Eskimos Greg Marshall FB Western Ontario

== 1st round ==
= CFL Division All-Star	= CFL All-Star	= Hall of Famer

Pick #	CFL team	Player	Position	School
1	Toronto Argonauts	Mike Kirkley	RB	Western Ontario
2	Toronto Argonauts	Greg Holmes	WR	Carroll College
3	Calgary Stampeders	Neil Evans	RB	Toronto
4	Saskatchewan Roughriders	Trent Soper	DB	Eastern Oregon
5	BC Lions	Bernie Glier	DB	British Columbia
6	Toronto Argonauts	Tony Antunovic	T	Simon Fraser
7	Toronto Argonauts	Chris Schultz	T	Arizona
8	BC Lions	Troy Ciochetti	WR	Alberta
9	Edmonton Eskimos	Rod Connop	G/C	Wilfrid Laurier

== 2nd round ==
10. Edmonton Eskimos Harry Doering DE Guelph

11. Montreal Alouettes Clint Van Ostrand OL Whitworth

12. Calgary Stampeders Robert Waite DL British Columbia

13. Saskatchewan Roughriders Gerald Prud'homme WR Concordia

14. British Columbia Lions Don Moen DB British Columbia

15. Winnipeg Blue Bombers Derek Faggiani DT Simon Fraser

16. Hamilton Tiger-Cats Dave Zilli LB Toronto

17. Hamilton Tiger-Cats Peter Langford DE Guelph

18. Edmonton Eskimos Mark Debrueys TE Western Ontario

== 3rd round ==
19. Calgary Stampeders Phil Charron WR Bishop's

20. Toronto Argonauts Marc Lemery LB McGill

21. Calgary Stampeders Dave Amer WR Bishop's

22. Saskatchewan Roughriders Mike Hughes T Sheridan

23. British Columbia Lions Ryan Potter TB Western Ontario

24. Winnipeg Blue Bombers Dan Bowes DE McMaster

25. British Columbia Lions Bernie Jolette LB Ottawa

26. Ottawa Rough Riders Terry Cahill DB East Stroudsburg State

27. Edmonton Eskimos Peter Janiuk G York

== 4th round ==
28. British Columbia Lions David Singh TB British Columbia

29. Montreal Alouettes Larry Stewart T Saint Mary's

30. Calgary Stampeders Rod Ambrose G Manitoba

31. Saskatchewan Roughriders Pierre Lord WR Fairmount State

32. British Columbia Lions Dave Leuty WR Western Ontario

33. Winnipeg Blue Bombers Darrin Boivin DL Manitoba

34. Hamilton Tiger-Cats David McCann WR Western Ontario

35. Ottawa Rough Riders Bruce Milks DB South Arkansas

36. Edmonton Eskimos David Sauve DE Harvard

== 5th round ==
37. Saskatchewan Roughriders James Williams DE Acadia

38. Montreal Concordes Carmen Salvatore DB Wilfrid Laurier

39. Calgary Stampeders Denis Tardif LB McGill

40. Saskatchewan Roughriders Kevin Rydeard DB Western Ontario

41. British Columbia Lions Tony Prencipe LB Manitoba

42. Winnipeg Blue Bombers Sam Papaconstantinou LB Toronto

43. Hamilton Tiger-Cats Dave Purve TE Simon Fraser

44. Ottawa Rough Riders Terry Elik LB Simon Fraser

45. Edmonton Eskimos Barry Quarrel DB Wilfrid Laurier

== 6th round ==
46. Saskatchewan Roughriders Paul Starkey C Eastern Oregon

47. Montreal Concordes Fred West DE Wilfrid Laurier

48. Calgary Stampeders Stuart Maclean LB Acadia

49. Saskatchewan Roughriders Mark Joncas DT McGill

50. British Columbia Lions Matt Kavanaugh C Simon Fraser

51. Winnipeg Blue Bombers Mitch Kiesman DE Manitoba

52. Hamilton Tiger-Cats Scott Waggoner TB Florida

53. Ottawa Rough Riders Greg Clarke QB British Columbia

54. Edmonton Eskimos Rick Paulitsch TB Alberta
