= Nereus (disambiguation) =

Nereus, in Greek mythology, was the eldest son of Pontus and Gaia.

Nereus may also refer to:

== People ==
- John Villiers, 3rd Earl of Clarendon (1757–1838), known as the Nereus of Pitt's forces
- Nereus Acosta (born 1966), Philippine politician, academician, and political scientist
- Nereus Mendenhall (1819–1893), American politician and educator
- Saint Nereus, a Roman saint

== Science ==
- 4660 Nereus, a small asteroid
- Nereus (crater), a small crater on Meridiani Planum
- Nereus Program, a global interdisciplinary initiative on ocean sustainability based at the University of British Columbia
- Network of European Regions Using Space Technologies (NEREUS)

== Technology ==
- Nereus (Nuclear Reactor)
- Nereus, an underwater tidal turbine installed at Newhaven, Victoria, Australia

== Vehicles ==
- Nereus (underwater vehicle), a hybrid autonomous underwater vehicle/remotely operated vehicle from the Woods Hole Oceanographic Institution (WHOI)
- HMAS Nereus, a 1939 channel patrol boat of the Royal Australian Navy
- HMS Nereus, the name of several Royal Navy ships
- SS Nereus, a Greek steamer known previously as the SS Pfalz
- USS Nereus, the name of several US Navy ships

== Other uses ==
- Nereus (DC Comics)
- Nereus Pharmaceuticals, an American pharmaceutical company founded in 1988
- Nereus Rowing Club, Amsterdam, founded in 1885
- A brand name of the motion sickness medication tradipitant

== See also ==
- Nereo (disambiguation)
