= Sparsh (festival) =

- Genre: Annual cultural festival
- Locations: Surat, India
- Filing status: Student-run, non-profit organization
- Sponsor: Sardar Vallabhbhai National Institute of Technology
- Website: sparshsvnit.in

Sparsh is the annual cultural festival of the Sardar Vallabhai National Institute of Technology. It usually takes place in the second or third week of february, and is one of the largest of its kind in the western region. This festival consists of mega-attractions, informal events, managerial events and numerous other competitions. The festivities of the day are followed by "Sparsh Nights - the Inaugural Night, Singing Night, Dancing Night, EDM Night and Celebrity Night.

== History ==
Sparsh was started back in 1993 by the students of SVNIT (earlier known as, Sardar Vallabhbhai Regional Engineering College (SVREC), Surat) with a very small budget. It was more of a college level annual fest then. As years passed by, it started gaining more and more popularity among other local colleges and its magnitude began to increase ever since. By 2000, Sparsh was considerably bigger than other college festivals in Gujarat, with numerous programs and events, but this was not the end to it. The magnitude increased even further in 2003 when the college was granted Deemed University status with the approval of the UGC/AICTE and was renamed Sardar Vallabhbhai National Institute of Technology.By 2007, when the Parliament of India passed the National Institutes of Technology Act, 2007 declaring it an Institute of National Importance, the fest made a nationwide impact and college students from all over India began participating, making it one of the biggest college fests of its kind in the Western Region. Sparsh 2012 raised the bar of Sparsh to make it one of the most attractive festivals in the country, attracting some of the most popular artists from the country. This year also marked the Golden Jubilee of SVNIT Surat. By 2012 the budget of the fest went up to Rs 40 lakhs and it attracted major sponsors like Toyota, DLF, Airtel, Coke along with 50 other sponsors.

In 2019 the Annual fest Sparsh was cancelled due to the Pulwama attack, as the funds for the nights was contributed to the Pulwama victims.

The fest started gaining the attention of sponsors and eventually the budget has kept on increasing every year. The stage of Sparsh has witnessed performances by various famous personalities like Sonu Nigam, Shaan, Udit Narayan, Kailash Kher, Salim–Sulaiman, KK, Daler Mehndi, Mohit Chauhan, Vishal–Shekhar, Neha Kakkar, Sachin–Jigar, Shirley Setia and various other national personalities.

== Events ==
=== Pronites ===
‘Pronites’ or ‘Pro-shows’ feature well known national and international artists from various fields of expertise such as Music, Dance, Design etc.

==== Inaugural Night ====
This night was started in Sparsh 2012. The night of proclamation, it is celebrated in the presence of dignitaries by lighting the lamp, followed by a prayer to goddess Sarawati. After the initiation prayers, the hosts declare the fest open and invite the guest performers on the stage. The Sparsh Inaugural Night have staged various artists like J-Walt from Spontaneous Fantasia, B-boying groups, Magicians. It has also witnessed famous troupes like the Hungarian Face Team, Nigel Mead, Pyromania, Antriksh Band and Hand shadowgraphy artists like Amar and Sabyaschi Sen, Rishabh Srivastava, Flute Gurukul.

==== Celebrity Night ====
Celebrity Night Serves as the concluding event of the five-day festival. Past performers have included various prominent artists and bands such as Shirley Setia, Vishal–Shekhar, Sonu Nigam, Shaan, Udit Narayan, Kailash Kher, Javed Ali, Salim–Sulaiman, Shraddha Pandit, KK, Daler Mehndi, Abhijeet Bhattacharya, Neha Kakkar, Euphoria, Mohit Chauhan, Gaurav Dagaonkar, Bombay Rockers, Parikrama and Paradigm.

=== Competitions ===
Sparsh has been the perfect stage for college contingents from across the Western Region. Competitions cover all the genres of art - Dramatics, Literary arts, Music, Dance, Visual arts, and, Film and Media, as mentioned above.

==== Singing Night ====
Where words fail, music speaks. “Sargam” is the singing night of Sparsh. The wide category of performances include Hindustani, Classical, Symphony, Orchestra, Opera, Heavy Metal, Punk rock. This is the night when the entire college congregates to witness magic unfold before their eyes. The melodious voice and the flowing music transport your mind into Trance.

==== Dancing Night ====
The festival ranges from Bharatnatyam in the south to Bhangra in the North Garba in the west to Chauu in the East. There is an assortment of western dancing styles including hip-hop, salsa, jazz, boogie and rumba. The crowd pulling event of Sparsh where the participants go crazy in the attempt to bag the best dance in different categories. Dancing night is a very important part of the event.

==== Fashion Night ====
'Jalwa' is a fashion event held during Sparsh, featuring student participants modeling various attires on the ramp. The event is evaluated by a panel of fashion industry professionals and public figures.

=== Day Events ===
Never lets anyone have an ideal moment in their itinerary for the day as they run, sprint or dash from watching their short film being premiered to solving mind boggling murder mysteries, while taking a mini break in between to sing your favorite song to the passing by crowd happily dazzled. The day events has witnessed events like Hypnotism, BBoying, Stuntmania, Rock Performances, Vintage Cars display among many other things.

==== Informals ====
The mini-events that cater to the hyperactive element in everyone, they keep the streets rustling with activity. A major part of it includes activities like Zorbing, Paintball, Quad Biking, ATV ride, Laser Tag, Console LAN Gaming etc.

Other events organized include Stunt shows, Treasure Hunt, Tribal Hunt etc. Games such as Gully cricket, Volleyball, Fuss ball, Tug of war, Sack race and Minute to win it as well as CSI (Unlock the Sherlock), Role Playing Games and the Mechanical Bull.This year fest was celebrated with enthusiasm by many students

==== Managerial Events ====
The wide variety of managerial events include but not limited to Bulls & Bears (A virtual Share trading Game), Ad venture (To unlock your advertising Potential), Be an Analyst (To test how you see the world around you), Bidwiser (Are you good at auctions?), CATalyst (Core management Test), Digital marketing, Politikicks, Mega-Quiz, Mega Antakshari, Short Movie Making, Treasure Hunt, Business Baazigar, Walk the Talk and many more.

==== Mega Attractions ====
They are on a grandiose scale and they certainly keep the crowd on their toes to watch the extremely entertaining performances. Some of the events had students rolling on the floor with either laughter (The Viral Fever videos, Sab Q-tiyapa hai) or involuntarily as per the command of master (Hypnotism), or to find out some possibly visible secret of the tricks (Arvind Jayashankar and Nigel Mead, The magician Mentalist). Besides it has also witnessed other stand-up performances by many renowned personalities

==== School Events ====
Since 2010 School Events have been an integral part of Sparsh. It provides school students exposure to the latest technical happenings as well as gives them a chance to learn various new things. It also gives them a platform to showcase their talent in technical, managerial as well as cultural fields. Various events like science working model, extempore, art/drawing, news show, mega quiz, mock tests etc. Also it had seen workshops on robotics, Photoshop, Rubik’s cube etc.

==== Lectures ====
Several lectures on topics that are both technical and non-technical have been organised in the past. Previous topics have included Ethical Hacking, 3D-Composition, Gesture Control Robotics, Web Development and Mock-CAT

==== Workshops ====
Workshops are an integral part of Sparsh. These are held with a vision of giving the students a hands on experience of the latest technology that is storming the world. These workshops are organized under expert guidance from various fields and are known to attract a lot of students owing to their repute and quality content. The past few years have witnessed workshops in Android App Development, Ethical Hacking, Apple App Development, Humanoid (Human Looking Robots), Gesture Control Robotics, Special Effects, Digital Photography and many other interesting topics.

==== Exhibitions ====
The motive behind exhibitions is to make students aware of the latest trend and to give a royal feel to the fest. ISRO, DRDO and numerous other esteemed organizations have presented exhibitions and workshops to provide students with hands-on experience and knowledge. Besides the Technical aspect, there are also exhibitions on photography, Cars, and Bikes, Arts, NCC etc.

== Artists and Celebrities ==
Sparsh has hosted numerous artists and famous personalities over the years with many big names and organizations being associated with it. Pronites has brought many renowned singers and bands like Antriksh Band, Shirley Setia Vishal–Shekhar, Sonu Nigam, Shaan, Udit Narayan, Kailash Kher, Javed Ali, Salim–Sulaiman, Shraddha Pandit, KK, Neha Kakkar, Daler Mehndi, Abhijeet Bhattacharya, Euphoria, Mohit Chauhan, Gaurav Dagaonkar, Bombay Rockers, Parikrama and Paradigm Shift. Many other artists and performers like J-Walt(Spontaneous Fantasia), Hungarian Face Team, Nigel Mead, Pyromania etc. have also graced the stage with their presence

== Social Cause ==
The students of SVNIT have realized their duties in giving back to the Society in every way possible, big or small. From small but effective events like blind orchestra in order to encourage and appreciate them to large-scale movements to eliminate educational inequality through associates with Teach to India have tried not to limit them in any way at all. Besides campaigns like “Dumas Bachao Abhiyaan”, Cleanliness Drives and Blood Donation awareness program have also left a huge impact.

== Sponsors & Past Associates ==
The Sparsh has attracted sponsorship from various corporations due to huge student participation. Many prominent names have been associated with many events in Sparsh including Toyota, Coca-Cola, VR, Aagam Group, Rupa, Larsen & Toubro, Aditya Birla Group, NBCC, Aircel, IMS, VLCC, Art of Living, DLF Limited, Atos Origin, FaaDooEngineers.com, ONGC, Nishal Group, The Gateway, Honda, Cinepolis, NH7, Blockbuster Restaurant, Pantaloons, Twenty19, Jalaram, Futurism, Airtel, Union Bank of India, Bank of Baroda, Kribhko, Essar, Vasari, NSM, Red Bull,Euro Chips, State Bank Of India, NBCC.The media sector has seen several names like Gujarat Guardian, Times of India, Rajasthan Patrika, Radio Mirchi, BIG FM 92.7. With a heavy footfall of over 10,000 + in 5-days, association with Sparsh is a matter of prestige and is reflected in the range of the sponsorship it attracts.

== Media and Publicity ==
Sparsh is one of the most widely publicized and covered college festival in Western India, receiving extensive coverage by all sectors of media. In print media leading newspapers like The Times of India, Rajasthan Patrika, Gujarat Guardian and also several local dailies cover Sparsh. In electronic media, Sparsh is covered by BIG FM 92.7 and Radio Mirchi
