= Nereo Bolzon =

Canadian football player (born 1960)

No. 36
- Position: Linebacker

Personal information
- Born: July 27, 1960 (age 66); Edmonton, Alberta, Canada
- Listed height: 6 ft 1 in (1.85 m)
- Listed weight: 210 lb (95 kg)

Career information
- High school: Bonnie Doon Composite (Bonnie Doon, Edmonton)
- University: Alberta (1979–1981)
- CFL draft: 1982

Career history
- 1982–1983: Edmonton Eskimos
- 1984: Montreal Concordes*
- 1984: Calgary Stampeders
- * Offseason or practice squad member only

Awards and highlights
- Grey Cup champion (1982); Vanier Cup champion (1980); First-team All-WIFL (1981)

Nereo Bolzon (born July 27, 1960) is a Canadian former professional football linebacker who played one season with the Edmonton Eskimos of the Canadian Football League (CFL). He was a territorial exemption of the Eskimos in the 1982 CFL draft. He played college football at the University of Alberta.

== Early life ==
Nereo Bolzon was born on July 27, 1960, in Edmonton. He played high school football at Bonnie Doon Composite High School in Bonnie Doon, Edmonton.

Bolzon played college football for the Alberta Golden Bears of the University of Alberta from 1979 to 1981 and was a starting linebacker. He helped Alberta win the Western Intercollegiate Football League (WIFL) title all three years he was with the team, including a victory in the 16th Vanier Cup in 1980. Bolzon earned first-team All-WIFL honors in 1981.

== Professional career ==
Bolzon was a territorial exemption of the Edmonton Eskimos in the 1982 CFL draft. He officially signed with the team on May 5, 1982. During training camp, he competed with Bill Manchuk for the Eskimos' backup linebacker position. However, they both ended up making the team. The Edmonton Journal noted that "the muscular 21-year-old Bolzon — a crushing tackler whose bodybuilder's physique is a reasonable facsimile of veteran Tom Towns' — seems destined for a future starting spot." He played in seven games for the Eskimos during the 1982 season, mostly on special teams, and returned one kickoff for 16 yards. He was placed on the injured list on September 1, 1982. Bolzon remained on the injured list as the Eskimos won the 70th Grey Cup against the Toronto Argonauts on November 28, 1982. After the retirement of Manchuk, Bolzon was poised to be the Eskimos top backup linebacker but ended up missing the entire 1983 season after undergoing knee surgery during the preseason.

On June 13, 1984, Bolzon was traded to the Montreal Concordes for future considerations, contingent on if he made the regular season roster. However, on June 26 before the start of the season, it was reported that Bolzon had been released.

Bolzon was signed to a 21-day trial by the Calgary Stampeders on July 9, 1984. He did not play in any games for the team.
