= Piplod, Surat =

Piplod
- Locality
- Country: India
- State: Gujarat
- District: Surat

Languages
  - Official: Gujarati, Hindi, English
- Time zone: UTC+5:30 (IST)
- PIN: 395007
- Vehicle registration: GJ
- Website: gujaratindia.com

Piplod is an upmarket locality in the city of Surat. It is home to Gaurav Path, which is dotted with multiplexes and malls. Piplod is one of the areas of Surat. Other examples include: City Light, Vesu, Adajan, etc.

== Location ==
Piplod is located in the Athwalines suburb of Surat. It lies South of the river Tapi and is connected to the older city by three bridges. A fourth one is coming soon.
