= Network of European Regions Using Space Technologies =

International non-profit association

The Network of European Regions Using Space Technologies or NEREUS is an international non-profit association. It was created in April 2008 and established under Belgian law. Its registered office is in Brussels, Belgium. The objective of NEREUS is to explore the benefits of space technologies for the European Regions and their citizens, and contribute to spread their applications.

NEREUS is financially independent and only funded by the yearly membership fees of its members. There are two possible memberships: Full member (European Regions) and Associate Member (companies, universities and other organisations).

== Full Members ==
The following European Regions are Full Members of NEREUS:

Belgium:

- Walloon Region

France:

- Aquitaine
- Brittany
- French Guiana
- Midi-Pyrénées
- Provence-Alpes-Côte d'Azur

Germany:

- Baden-Württemberg
- Bavaria
- Brandenburg
- Free Hanseatic City of Bremen
- Hesse

Italy:

- Abruzzo
- Apulia
- Basilicata
- Lazio
- Lombardia
- Tuscany
- Veneto

Netherlands:

- Province of South Holland

Poland:

- Mazowieckie Voivodeship

Portugal:

- Azores

Spain:

- Andalusia
- Region of Madrid

United Kingdom:

- East Midlands

== Associate Members ==
The following organisations are Associate Members of NEREUS:

- AIPAS - Associazione delle Imprese per le Attività Spaziali
- Airbus Defence and Space
- ALTEC S.p.A. - Advanced Logistics Technology Engineering Center
- Compagnia Generale per lo Spazio CGS S.p.A.
- CEREMA - Centre d’études et d’expertise sur les risques, l’environnement, la mobilité et l’aménagement
- CNES - Centre national d'études spatiales
- CVARG - Centro de Vulcanologia e Avaliação de Riscos Geológicos
- CISAS - Centro di Ateneo di Studi e Attività Spaziali "Giuseppe Colombo"
- Chambre de Commerce et d'Industrie du Gers
- Cité de l'espace
- CORILA - Consorzio per il coordinamento delle ricerche inerenti al sistema lagunare di Venezia
- Consorzio TERN - Technologies for Earth Observation and Natural Risks
- EDISOFT SA
- EURAC - European Academy of Bolzano/Bozen
- EUTELSAT Archived 2013-02-27 at the Wayback Machine
- FADOT - Fundación Aragonesa para el Desarrollo de la Observación de la Tierra
- FFG
- GeoVille GmbH
- GIS Bretagne Télédétection
- IREA CNR U.O.S. Milano
- Interbalkan Environment Center, i-BEC
- Italian Cluster for Aerospace Technologies
- Network della meccanica molfettese, NE.MO
- OMP - Observatoire Midi-Pyrénées
- Pôle Mer Bretagne
- Politecnico di Milano B.E.S.T. Department
- Politecnico di Torino
- SAM - Società Aerospaziale Mediterranea
- Selex Galileo
- SES S.A.
- AEIT - Asociación Española de Ingenieros de Telecomunicación
- STAE Toulouse - Sciences et Technologies pour l'Aéronautique et l'Espace
- Technapoli
- Telespazio France
- TéSA Laboratory
- Thales Alenia Space
- Toscana Spazio
- T.R.E. s.r.l.
- University of Turin

== Working Groups ==
The Working Groups were created in March 2009. They include the main fields of cooperation of the NEREUS Political Charter and focus on the applications of several space-related concepts. The following Working Groups exist within NEREUS:

- Earth Observation/Copernicus WG
- Global Navigation Satellite Systems (GNSS) WG
- Telecommunication WG
- Technologies from Space Exploration WG
- Communication, Education and Training (CET) WG
- Clusters WG

== Projects ==
The following projects are currently being carried out by NEREUS:

- THE ISSUE - Traffic- Health- Environment-Intelligent Solutions Sustaining Urban Economies
- FORMAT-EO - FORmation of Multi-disciplinary Approaches to Training in Earth Observation. It is an Erasmus master-level summer school on Earth Observation.

NEREUS is also involved in some projects being carried out by its partners:

- SABER - Satellite Broadband for European Regions - Thematic Network
- BRESAT - Broadband in EU Regions via Satellite
- ISTIMES - Integrated System for Transport Infrastructures surveillance and Monitoring by Electromagnetic Sensing
- SHIRA - Satellite for High resolution Infrared Application
- STEPS - Systems and Technologies for Space Exploration – Piedmontese Aerospace Platform
- Territorial satellite technologies: the NEREUS network's Italian experiences - Study of the Italian regions
