= Sardar Vallabhbhai National Institute of Technology, Surat =

Public Research University in Surat, Gujarat

- Sardār Vallabhabhāī Rāṣṭrīya Praudyogikī Saṃsthān, Sūrat
- Former names: Sardar Vallabhbhai Regional College of Engineering and Technology (1961–2002)
- Motto: Vijñānaṃ sārathiḥ naḥ syāt
- Motto in English: May knowledge be our charioteer
- Type: Public technical university
- Established: 1961; 65 years ago; 2002; 24 years ago (as SVNIT)
- Accreditation: NBA; NAAC; UGC; AICTE
- Affiliations: Institute of National Importance; National Institutes of Technology
- Budget: ₹172 crore (US$18 million)
- Chairperson: Dr. Bhim Singh
- Director: Anupam Shukla
- Academic staff: 137
- Total staff: 591
- Students: 5,831 (2023–24)
- Undergraduates: 3,618 (2023–24)
- Postgraduates: 567 (2023–24)
- Doctoral students: 856 (2023–24)
- Other students: 790 (2023–24)
- Location: Surat, Gujarat, 395007, India; 21°09′52″N 72°47′07″E
- Campus: 250 acres (100 ha); Urban
- Acronym: SVNIT
- Nickname: SVNITians
- Website: www.svnit.ac.in

Sardar Vallabhbhai National Institute of Technology, Surat or National Institute of Technology, Surat (SVNIT or NIT, Surat), is a public technical university established by the Parliament of India in 1961. It is one of 31 National Institutes of Technology in India recognized by the Government of India as an Institute of National Importance. It is the Anchor Institute for the Auto and Engineering sector and will be training the workforce. The project is also designated as the "Center of Excellence under Technical Education Quality Improvement Program" in water resources and flood management and is supported by the World Bank.

The institute organizes annual cultural and technical festivals: MindBend (technical festival) and Sparsh (cultural festival) that attract participants from all over the country and abroad.

== History ==
To serve the growing demand for trained quality technical manpower, the Government Of India established fourteen Regional Engineering Colleges (RECs) between 1959 and 1965, now known as NITs with campuses at Surat, Allahabad, Bhopal, Calicut, Durgapur, Kurukshetra, Jamshedpur, Jaipur, Nagpur, Rourkela, Srinagar, Surathkal, Tiruchirappalli, and Warangal.

Under its former name, Sardar Vallabhbhai Regional College of Engineering and Technology, NIT Surat was established in June 1961 as a cooperative venture between the Government of India and the Government of Gujarat. The institute is named after India's first Home Minister, fondly known as the Ironman of India, honourable Sardar Vallabhbhai Patel.

A review committee (HPRC) was set up by the Union Government in 1998 for the review of RECs. The HPRC, under the chairmanship of Dr. R.A. Mashelkar, submitted its report entitled "Strategic Road Map for Academic Excellence of Future RECs" in 1998. Following the recommendations of HPRC, in 2002, the Union Ministry of Human Resource Development, Government of India upgraded, the seventeen Regional Engineering Colleges (RECs) to National Institutes of Technology (NITs). On 4 December 2002 the institution was granted Deemed University status with the approval of the UGC/AICTE and was renamed Sardar Vallabhbhai National Institute of Technology.

On 5 June 2007, the Parliament of India passed the National Institutes of Technology Act declaring it an Institute of National Importance which came into effect on Independence Day 2007.

== Administration ==
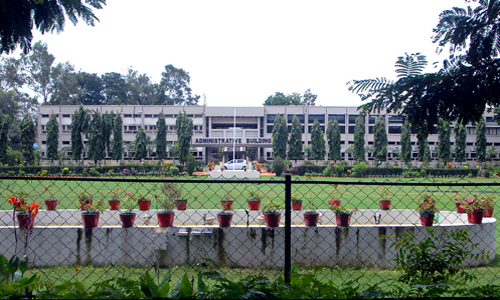
Administrative Building SVNIT Surat

NIT Surat is governed by its ex officio visitor, the honourable President of India and the NIT Council which heads the NIT organizational structure. Under the NIT Council is NIT Surat's Board of Governors consisting of 12 members that include representatives of the state of Gujarat, MoE in addition to other members appointed by the NIT Council and the institute's senate. The Director serves under the Board of Governors and is the school's chief academic and executive officer. Under the director and the deputy director are the deans, heads of departments, registrar and Chief Hostel Warden.

The Registrar is the chief administrative officer and oversees day-to-day operations. He is the custodian of records, funds, and other properties of the institute. Under the charge of the heads of departments (HoD) are the faculty (full-time professors as well as those of associate and assistant status). The director is the chairman of the Council of Wardens and the wardens of hostels are placed under the Chief Hostel Warden of individual hostels in the organization.

NIT Surat had received ₹147.47 crore (US$15 million) funding from Government of India during 2019-20. Other sources of funds include student fees and research funding from industry-sponsored projects. NIT Surat subsidizes undergraduate student fees by approximately 80% and provides scholarships to all M.Tech students and research scholars to encourage them to pursue higher studies.

The academic policies of NIT Surat are decided by its senate. It consists of all professors of the institute and administrative and student representatives. The Senate controls and approves the curriculum, courses, examinations and results and appoints committees to look into academic matters. The teaching, training and research activities of the institute are reviewed by the senate to maintain educational standards. The director is the ex officio chairman of the senate.

NIT Surat follows the credit-based system of performance evaluation, with proportional weighting of courses based on their importance. The total marks (usually out of 100) form the basis of grades, with a grade value (out of 10) assigned to a range of marks. For each semester, the students are graded by taking a weighted average from all the courses with their respective credit points. Each semester's evaluation is done independently with a cumulative grade point average (CGPA) reflecting the average performance across semesters. The medium of instruction is English.

== Campus ==
The campus is located in the city's prime area locally known as Ichchhanath in the city of Surat at a distance of about 10 km from the Surat Railway Station and 10 km from Surat International Airport. The main entrance is located on the northern end of the campus, facing Surat-Dumas Road which is on the way to a small seaside resort known as Dumas, from the railway station. The city buses regularly operate from early morning till midnight, between Surat Railway Station and College Campus/Piplod. Other than the city bus, auto-rickshaws (more commonly) or taxis are also available. The campus is very near to the various entertainment hubs of Surat, it also is a much-favoured place for joggers and walkers who come regularly to the campus in the morning and evening time.

=== Student halls of residence ===
SVNIT has 7 boy's hostels, 1 girl's hostel, 1 family hostel and 1 guest house named after personalities of India which provide accommodation to about 4174 students. Each hostel is administrated by the Chief Hostel Warden. Each hostel elects representatives from the hostel residents for areas like Magazine/Library, Cultural, Sports, Mess etc. Two mega hostels for boys and one mega hostel for girls with many facilities have been constructed.

Each hostel has its mess, TV room, Sports room and computer facility and some hostels have been equipped with a magazine room for magazines, newspapers and books.

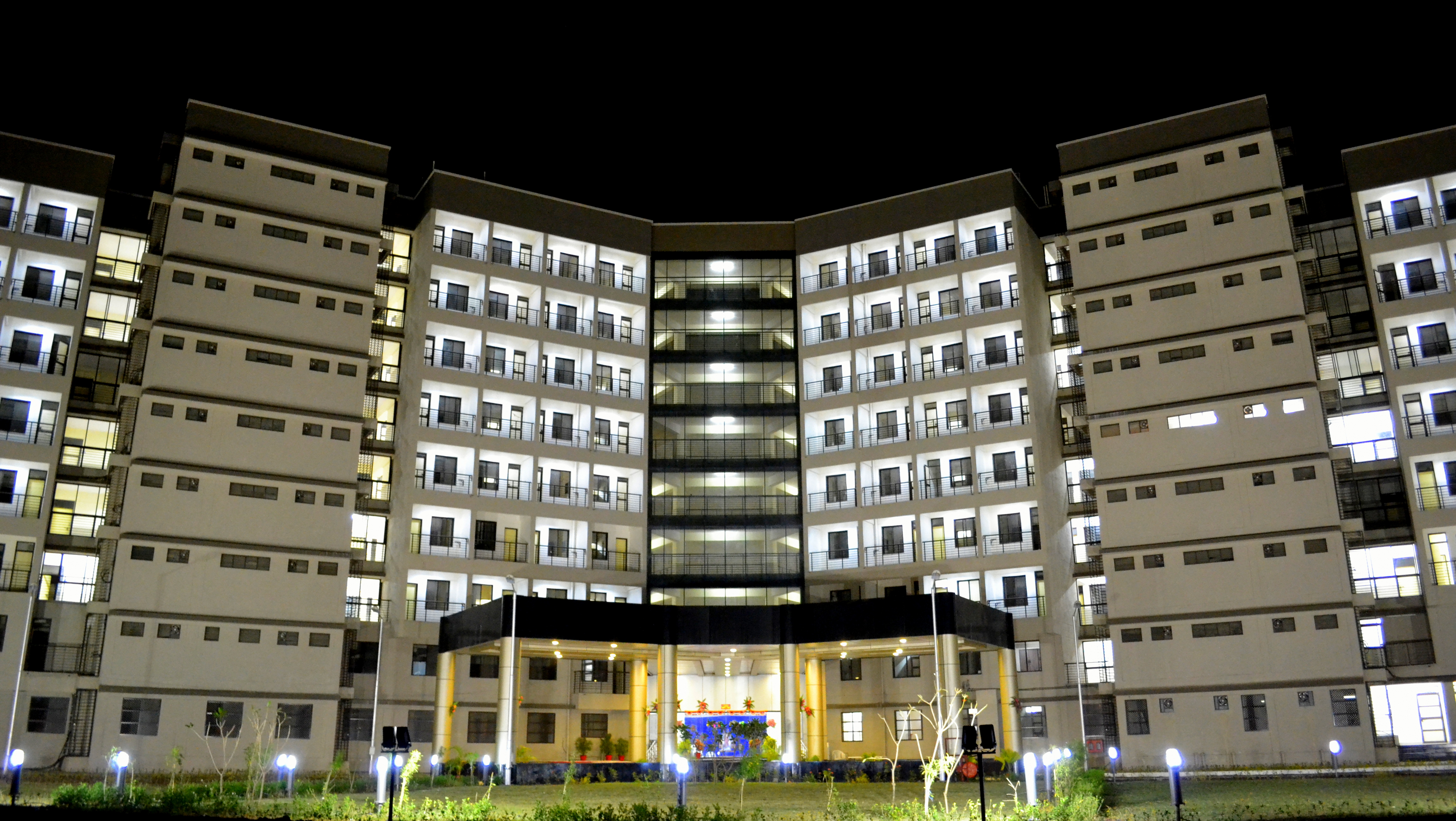
Swami Vivekanand Bhavan

== Admissions and academics ==
Admission to most undergraduate and postgraduate courses in NIT Surat is granted through written entrance examinations. Admission to M.Tech. and Ph.D. programmes is based primarily on a personal interview, though candidates have to take written tests as well.

Admission to undergraduate programmes in all NITs is through the All India Engineering Entrance Examination now known as JEE Main. Candidates who qualify for admission through JEE Main can apply for admission in B.Tech. (Bachelor of Technology) and Integrated M.Sc. (Master of Science) courses at NIT Surat. The admissions to postgraduate programmes (M.Tech.) are made primarily through the Graduate Aptitude Test in Engineering (GATE). Integrated MSc program was started in the year 2007, in three branches Chemistry, Physics & Mathematics. This program now has 75 seats each.

NIT Surat follows the reservation policy declared by the Supreme Court of India, by which 27% of seats are reserved for Other Backward Classes (OBCs), 15% for Scheduled Castes (SCs), 7.5% for Scheduled Tribes (STs) and 10% of seats are reserved for General Economically Weaker Section (EWS). The institute also accepts foreign nationals through scholarships awarded by the Government of India, and non-resident Indians through an independent scheme known as Direct Admission for Students Abroad (DASA).

=== Sponsored research ===
Research in the institute is sponsored by various agencies including Council of Scientific and Industrial Research (CSIR), Defence Research and Development Organisation (DRDO) and the Department of Science and Technology (DST); in 2019–20, active research grants from these agencies exceeded ₹50 crore (US$5.2 million). In 2019-20, consultancy service of ₹12.28 crore (US$1.3 million) and testing of ₹55.22 lakh (US$57,000) has been carried out.

The campus also boasts of having India's first solar plant to desalinate seawater. This was set up at an investment of ₹3.5 crore (US$360,000).

=== Ranking ===
University and college rankings

General – India
- NIRF (Overall) (2022): 101–150

Engineering – India
- NIRF (2024): 59

SVNIT was ranked 59th by National Institutional Ranking Framework (NIRF) in the engineering category in 2024 and in the 101–150 overall.

== Student life ==
NIT Surat provides on-campus residential facilities to its students, research scholars, faculty members and staff. The students live in hostels (referred to as the Bhavans) throughout their stay in the institute. Facilities such as computing infrastructure and high-speed internet are extended to all the hostels and the entire campus is connected via Gigabit LAN. The institute is the participant of Ministry of Education, Government of India NMEICT/NKN project through which connectivity of 1000 Mbit/s (100 Mbit/s for connectivity and rest 900 Mbit/s is for e-content in future) is functioning.

=== Festivals ===
The institute has student-organised festivals like MindBend, Kashish/Abhinandan (first year welcome program), Dasvidaniya (final year farewell), Sparsh, Quest (by ACM), Ignis (Sports festival), Grand Robo Prix-GRP and Makerspace (by DRISHTI), JoyFest (by iIndia), MMNCT, SIPHON (organized by Chemical Engineering society), AATISH (organized by Electrical Engineering Society) and Prakriti (organized by Sciences department).

MindBend is SVNIT's annual technical festival, the largest in Gujarat. Technical competitions and events covering all areas of engineering expose students across India to practical engineering. There are competitions, guest lectures, workshops and quizzes. The robotics events of Mindbend are famous in Western India.

Sparsh is SVNIT's annual cultural festival. It usually takes place in the second week of February. This five-day festival, the largest of its kind in South Gujarat consists of literary and debating events/competitions in the morning and gala cultural shows in the evenings. The 'Sparsh Nights' are the Singing Night, Dance and Skit Night, Fashion Night, Inaugural and Celebrity Night.

AutumnFest is SVNIT's annual Automotive-Entrepreneurial festival. In 2007 events included The Apprentice, Business Baazigar, Spark the B-plan event, Strategem, and Lock Stock and Trade. A workshop by Mantis was part of Entru-meet '07.

Manoj Memorial Night Cricket Tournament (MMNCT) is a cricket tournament, organized by the students with the help of SVNIT Board of Sports, Hostel Office and Bihar Students Alumni. This tournament was first organized in 2006. It is in remembrance of a student, Manoj Kumar, who was pursuing electrical engineering in the institute and died of dengue. All the matches are played under floodlights.

=== Student organisations ===
- PC(Physics Club)
- CHRD(Centre for Human Resource Development)
- DSC (Developer Student Clubs) Student Chapter
- NCC (National Cadet Corps (India))
- DRISHTI (Technical Hobby Club)
- Official Language Implementation Committee (Hindi Cell)
- ACM (Association for Computing Machinery) Student Chapter
- CEV (Cutting Edge Visionaries)
- CES (Civil Engineering Society)
- SAE (Society of Automotive Engineers)

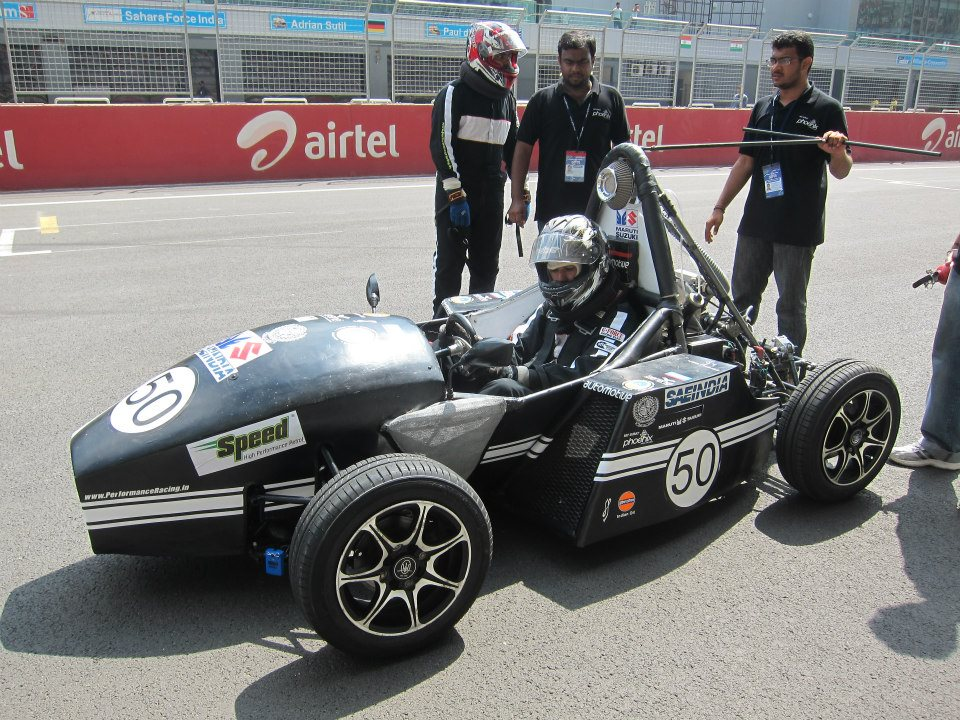
TEAM PHOENIX RACING (CAR NO. 50) at Buddh International Circuit, Noida, India

- SPIC MACAY(Society for the Promotion of Indian Classical Music And Culture Amongst Youth)
- LAC (Literary Affairs Committee)
- SCOSH (Society for Cultivation of Sciences and Humanity)
- EES (Electrical Engineering Society)
- ISHRAE (Indian Society of Heating, Refrigerating and Air Conditioning Engineers)
- NSS (National Service Scheme)
- ChES (Chemical Engineering Society)
- IIW(Indian Institute of Welding)

=== Student publications ===
Multiple press and media publications are managed by the institute students, which includes AS WE ARE (annual college magazine), Sammukh Hindi Magazine: "सम्मुख"( राजभाषा विभाग की वार्षिक पत्रिका ), and Renesa (monthly college magazine).

=== Alumni network ===
The SVNIT Alumni Association fosters a close relationship between the institute and its alumni. The association consists of a wide network of alumnus, students, staff, and faculty who organize events, publications and alumni meets. The group is directed by the office of the Dean of Alumni and Resource Generation.

The Alumni Association has chapters extending to all metropolitan cities in India and abroad that hold annual networking meets and class reunions.

== Notable alumni ==
- Anshul Kothari Represented India in the Swimming Category at the 2010 Commonwealth Games, 2010 Asian Games, 2014 Asian Games and 2018 Asian Games.
