= Timeline of Surat =

City history timeline

This article is a timeline of the city Surat in Gujarat For a more comprehensive overview of Surat's history, please see History of Surat.

== Pre-1600s ==
- 12-15th centuries — Part of Delhi Sultanate, plundered multiple times.
- 1372 — Surat Fort initially constructed during Tughlaq rule.
- 15th century — Gujarat Sultanate established.
- Late 15th century — Malik Gopi, a merchant and later Governor of Surat in the Sultanate, arrives and settles in the city.
- 1510s — Continuous developments of the city take place under Malik Gopi. Gopi Talav, an artificial lake, is built. The city is first given the name Suryapur and soon after Surat.
- 1512 — City is first burned by the Portuguese (second time in 1530).
- 1514 — Surat is acknowledged by Portuguese traveller Duarte Barbosa as an important port, frequented by many ships from Malabar and other various places.
- 1530 — The city is ravaged for a second time in flames by the Portuguese.
- 1546 — Construction of the Surat Fort is completed.
- 1573 — Surat is conquered by the Mughal emperor Akbar, the most prosperous port in the state, used for travel to the Hajj pilgrimage

== 1600s-1800s ==
- 1612
  - First factory (KOTHI) in India is established by England, a centre for trade and commerce.
  - 29–30 November — Battle of Suvali takes place in a village near Surat.
- 1616 — Dutch trading post established by Pieter van den Broecke in Surat (Suratte).
- 1644 — Inauguration of Mughal Sarai.
- 1664 — Chhatrapati Shivaji Maharaja emerges victorious in the Battle of Surat against Inayat Khan (Mughal) and goes on to raid the city.
- 1670 — City raided again by Marathas.
- 1759 — Over the past few years trade had substantially decreased due to the rise of Bombay as an important city.
- 1790-1 — An epidemic affects the city: 1,00,000 Gujaratis dead.
- 1795 — Dutch Suratte comes under British protection, who promise to restore it to the Dutch when peace is reestablished in Europe.
- 1797 — Under full control of Bombay Presidency in British East India Company.
- 1802 — According to the Treaty of Amiens, the Dutch were supposed to regain their territories, however, this did not take place.
- 1814 — The Anglo-Dutch Treaty of 1814 finally restores Dutch Suratte to the Dutch.
- 1824
  - Suratte is again relinquished to the British as per the Anglo-Dutch Treaty of 1824.
  - Anglican Church built.
- 1837 — Fire breaks out, taking the lives of 500 and demolishing 9,737 houses. It is the most destructive fire in the history of Surat.
- 1850 — Andrews Library established.

== 1900s-Present ==
- 1962 — Sardar Vallabhbhai National Institute of Technology established.
- 1965 — Veer Narmad South Gujarat University established.
- 1991 — Kavi Narmad Central Library established.
- 1994 — Pneumonic plague affects Surat; 56 dead, 693 suspected, 3,00,000 migrated from the city.
- 2006 — A flood ravaged Surat covering 80-95% of the city.
- 2010 — Surat Diamond Bourse established.
- 2013 — Surat Bus Rapid Transit System begin operation November 2013 (Phase I).
- 2015 — Project for restoration of the Surat Fort is inaugurated by government, with an investment of 55 crores.
- 2019 — Fire in a commercial complex in Sarthana Jagatnaka kills 22 students.
- 2020 — COVID-19 in Surat:
  - Cases tested - 87.23 lakhs.
  - Patients recovered - 2.11 lakhs.
  - Total deaths - 2084.
- 2023 —Surat Diamond Bourse, built at a cost of approximately Rs 3,500 crore, the building spans 6.6 lakh square metres (71 lakh square feet) of floor space and has the capacity to house nearly 4,500 diamond trading offices, was officially opened by Narendra Modi.
