= History of Surat =

City in India

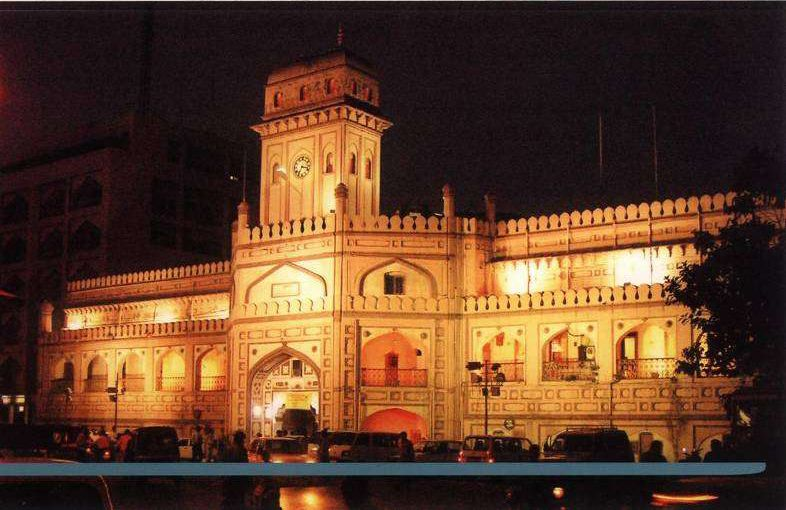
The Mughal Sarai was a caravanserai built in 1644 CE during the Mughal rule. The clock tower was added in 1844 by the British.

The city of Surat was founded in the late medieval period and gradually became an important port in the Mughal Empire, though the earliest human presence may go back as early as 300 BCE. The Maratha rulers defeated the Mughals during the Battle of Surat and subsequently looting the city. Later, the Dutch ruled the area and the city became known as Dutch Suratte.

== Medieval history ==
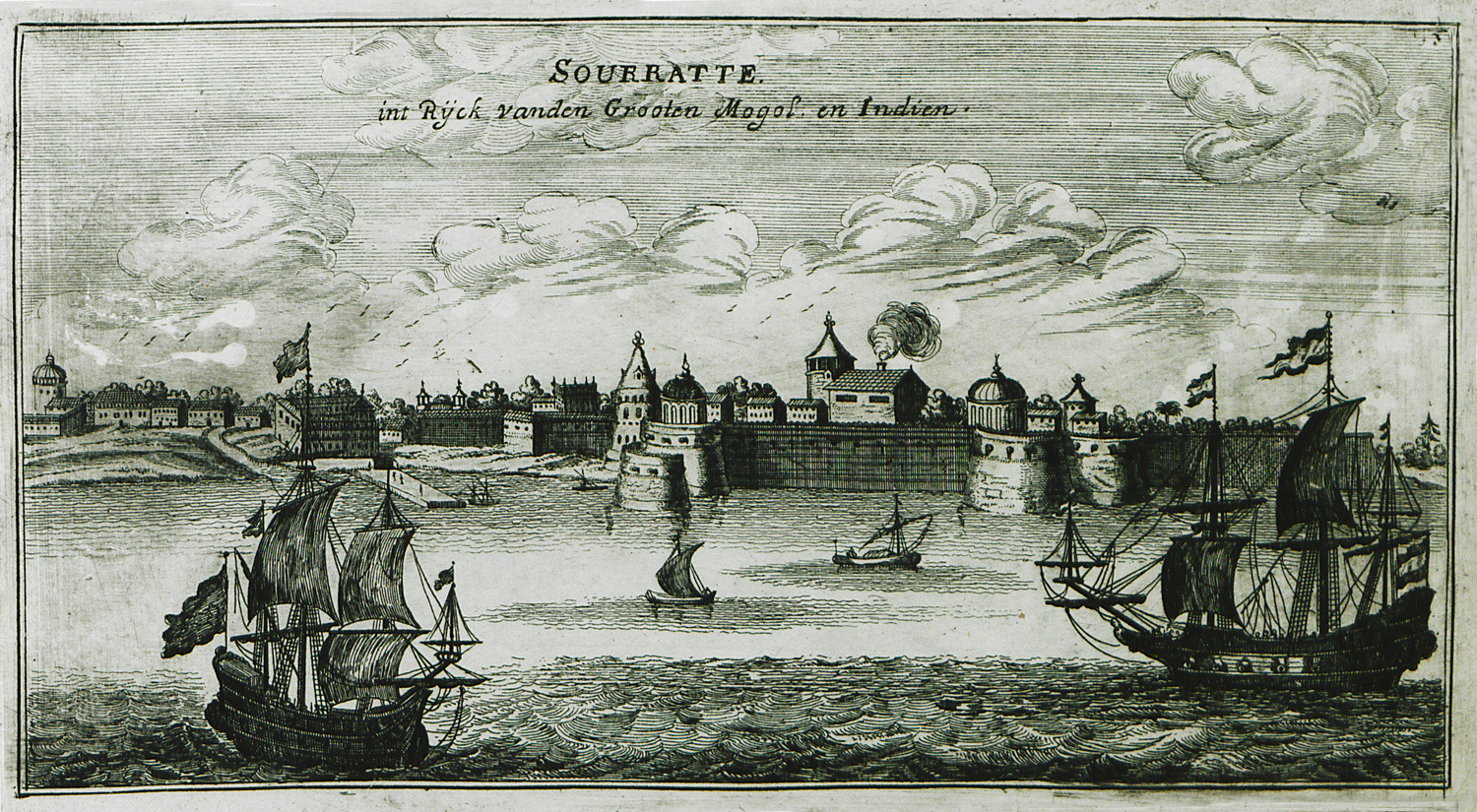
Surat in 1690

In the 12th and 15th centuries, Surat was plundered by Muslims. In 1512, and again in 1530, Surat was ravaged by the Portuguese Empire. In 1514, the Portuguese traveler Duarte Barbosa described Surat as an important seaport, frequented by many ships from Malabar.

=== Gujarat Sultanate ===
Several early European travellers to India make mentions about an influential Brahmin named Malik Gopi, who settled the region and founded the city. It is possible that Gopi was a governor under the Gujarat Sultanate. Notably, Gopi oversaw the construction of an artificial lake, known as Gopi Talav, for water storage in 1516. The area he developed was called Gopipura in his honour. For his contributions, Gopi was given the title Malik by the Sultan of Gujarat Muzaffar Shah II. The town that Gopi developed was unnamed for long and after consulting astrologers he proposed to name it "Suraj" or "Suryapur". By 1520, the name of the city had become Surat as the king, disliking the Hindu inclination of the name, altered it to "Surat", (alluding to the Arabic words for headings of the chapters of the Quran). Gopi also finds mentions in Portuguese literature as "Lord of Surat and Bharuch".

=== Mughal Empire ===
In 1573, Surat was conquered by the Mughals. It was the most prosperous port in the Mughal empire, used for travel to the Hajj pilgrimage. Despite being a rich city, Surat looked like a typical "grubby" trader's town with mud-and-bamboo tenements and crooked streets, although along the riverfront there were a few mansions and warehouses belonging to local merchant princes and the establishments of Turkish, Armenian, English, French and Dutch traders. There were also hospitals for cows, horses, flies and insects run by religious Jains, which puzzled travelers. Some streets were narrow while others were of sufficient width. In the evening, especially near the Bazaar (marketplace), the streets became crowded with people and merchants (including Banyan merchants) selling their goods. Surat was a populous city during the Mughal era but also had a large transient population: during the monsoon season, when ships could come and go from the ports without danger, the city's population would swell. In 1612, England established its first Indian trading factory in Surat.

=== Reign of the emperor Aurangzeb ===
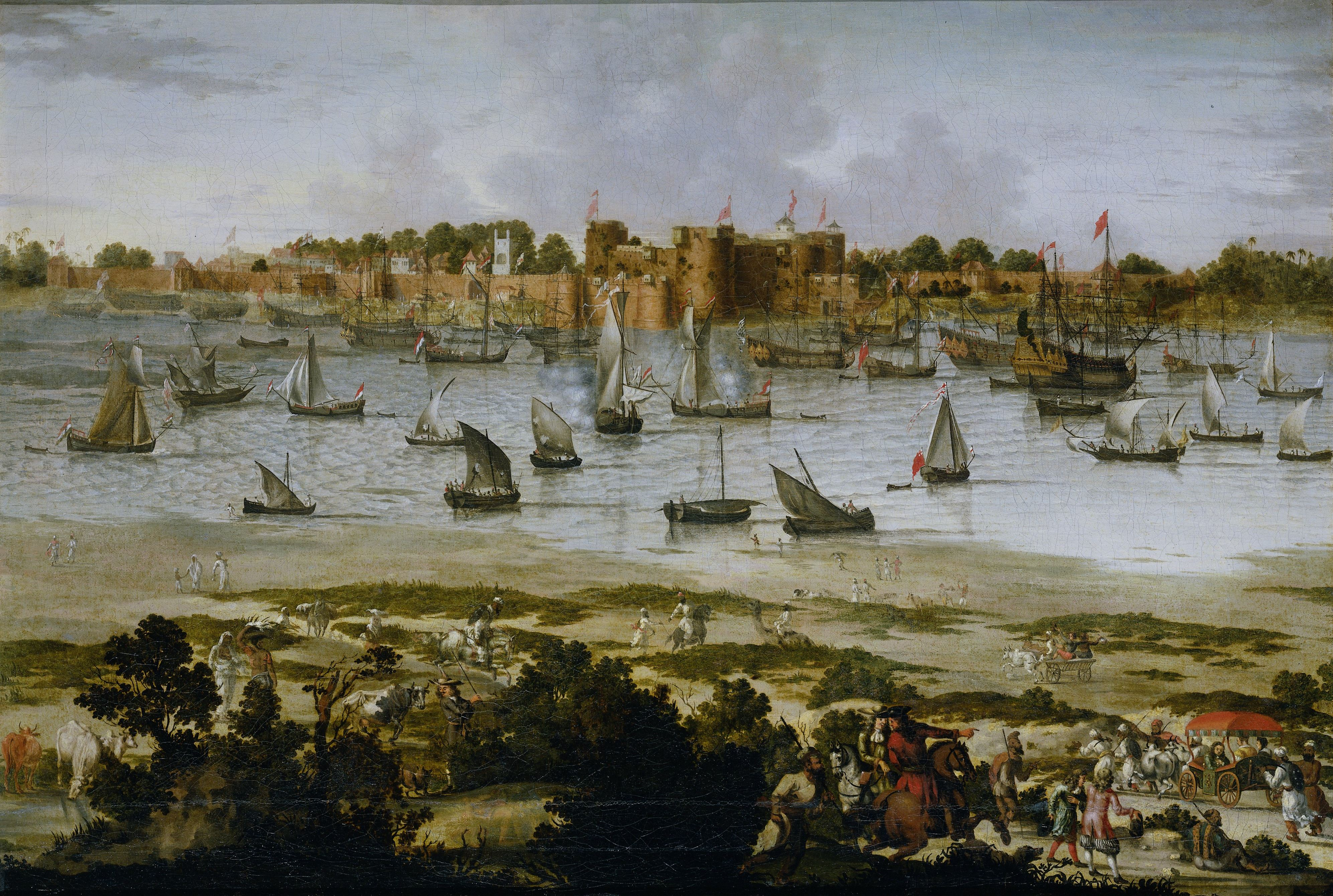
Dutch painting of Surat, c. 1670

The city was conquered twice by the Maratha king Shivaji, with the first sacking occurring in 1664.

Surat was sacked by Marathas twice: first in January 1664 and then in October 1670.

During the reign of the emperor Aurangzeb, Rustam Manek emerged as a prominent Parsi leader who served as agent to both the Portuguese Estado and English East India Company in Surat.

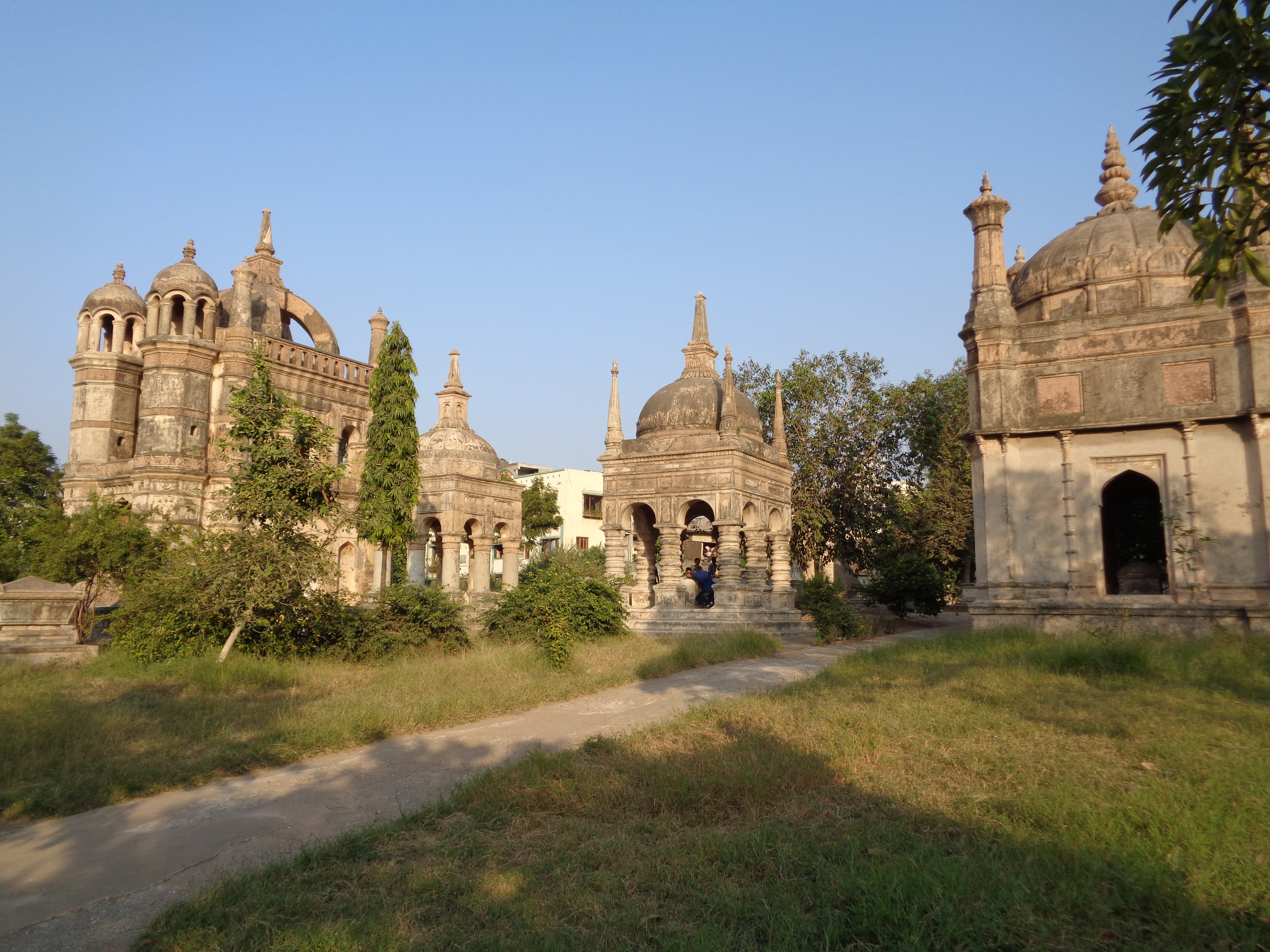
English tombs at Surat

From 1690-1703, European pirates were active on the trade/pilgrimage routes between Surat and the Red Sea and Persian Gulf. Popular anger in the city against these pirates (such as against the capture of the Grand Mughal Fleet by Henry Every or the Quedagh Merchant by William Kidd) led to poor relations with European traders who were blamed for their countrymen's actions. The Mughal Empire under Aurangzeb, lacking a powerful navy, shouldered the responsibility of dealing with pirates to the European companies, via means of imprisonment of European merchants, a system of armed escorts, written pledges and guarantees of compensation, all of which failed. Piracy in the Indian ocean went into decline after this period.

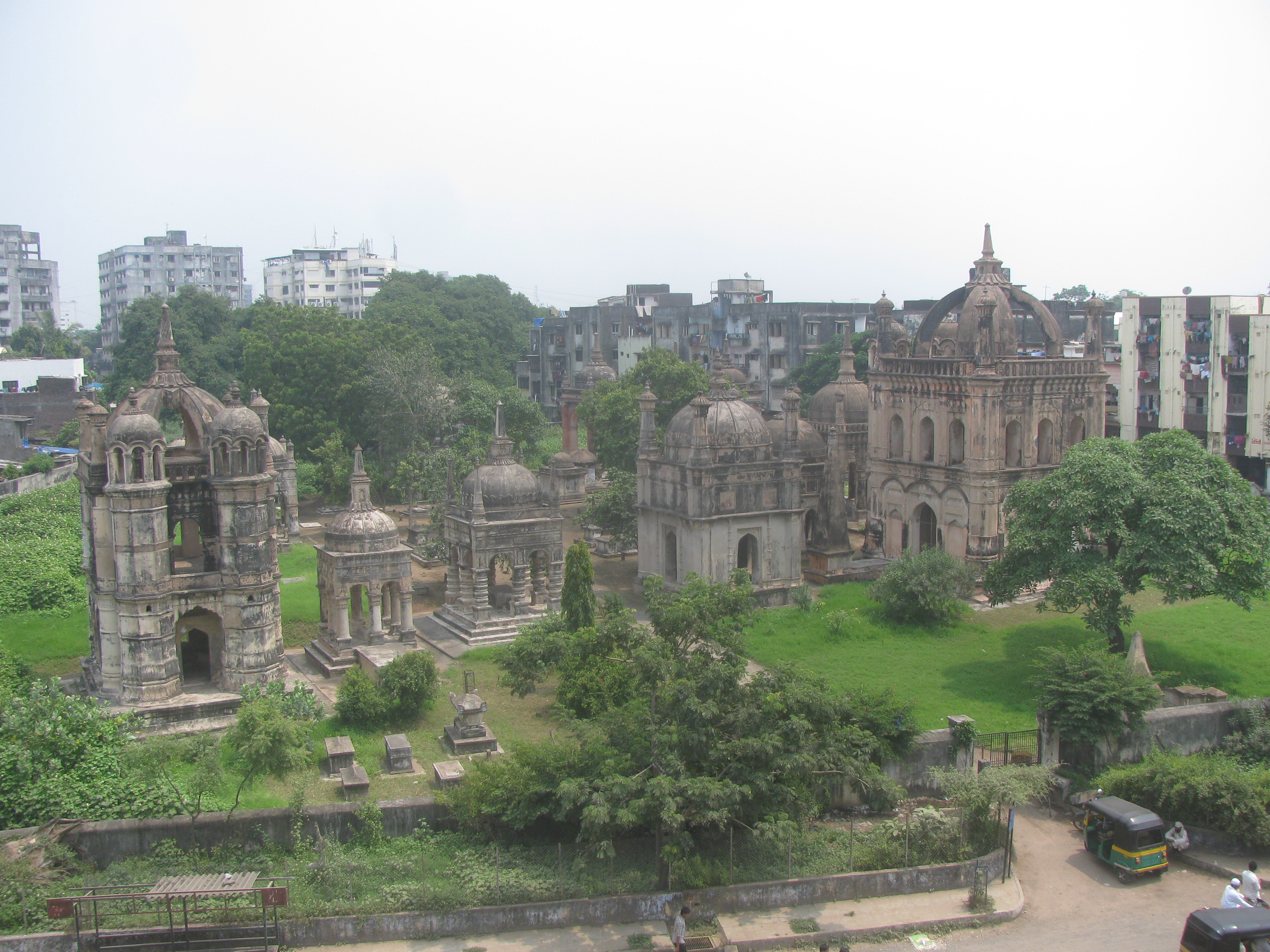
Dutch-Armenian Cemetery of Surat

In 1698, the New East India Company was founded by an English royal charter and in early 1700 Nicholas Waite arrived in Surat as its consul.

In late 1700, Sir William Norris, 1st Baronet arrived in Surat as a royal ambassador for William III of England and the New East India Company. He along with Rustam Manek made for the imperial camp of Aurangzeb in the Deccan where he sought imperial firmans which would give permission to establish the New Company's factories in Surat and other privileges. In return Aurangzeb desired the New East India Company to assume responsibility for damages caused by European pirates in the Indian Ocean (terms already agreed to by the Old English East India Company, Dutch East India Company, and Louis XIV's French East India Company). Norris' mission was ultimately a complete failure, owing to the hostility of the Old East India Company to the New East India Company's mission, the refusal of Aurangzeb's terms, and Norris' personal ego and lack of diplomatic tact. In the end the Mughal court viewed this mission as having no political importance and neglected its mention in Persian historical works.

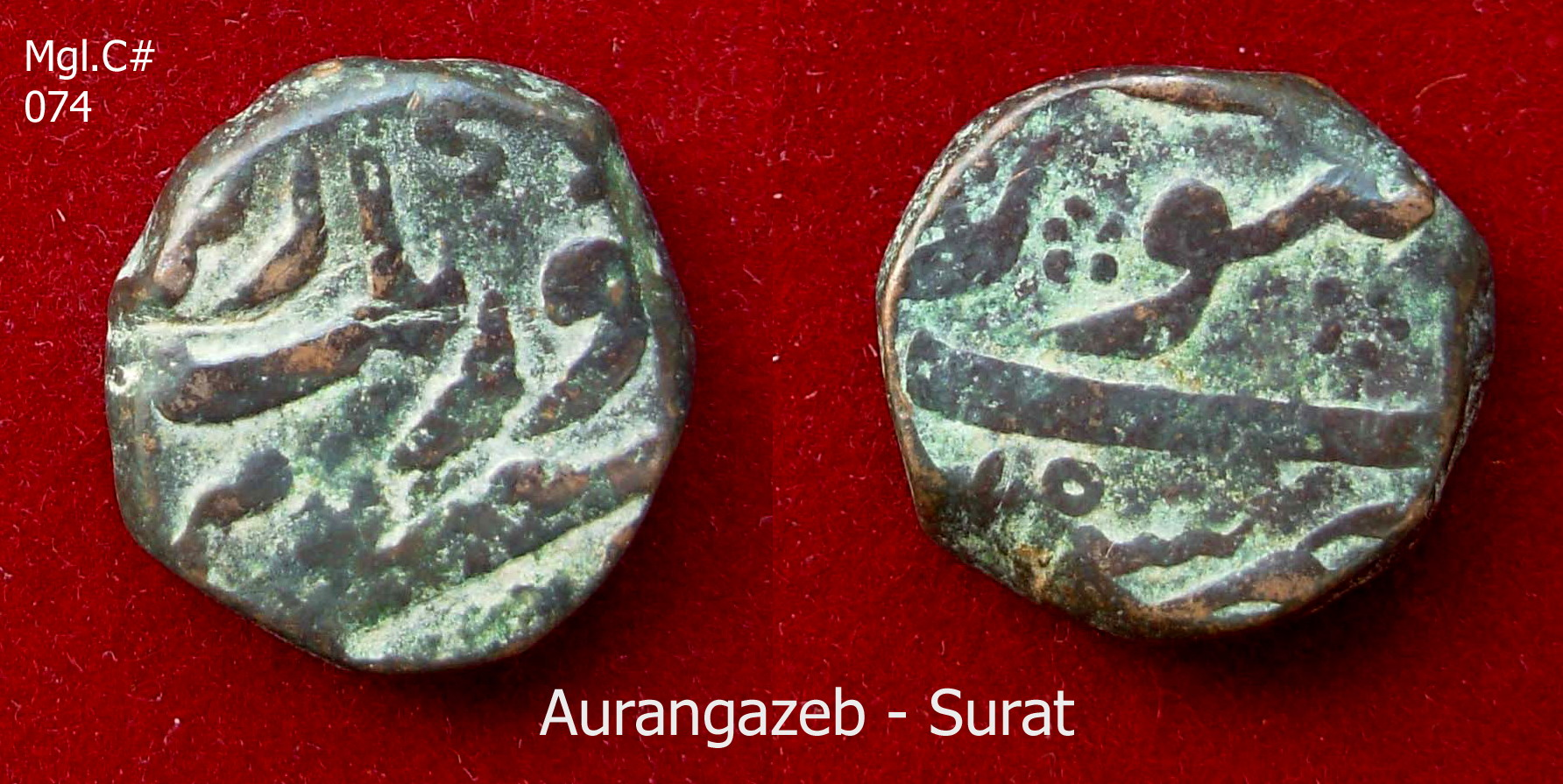
Copper coin of Aurangzeb issued from the Surat mint.

Waite himself was a conniving figure and continuously remonstrated to the Surat governor that the Old East India Company was in league with the pirates, leading to the repeated imprisonment of the Old Company's factors including general John Gayer, Governor of Bombay, who happened to be in Surat at the time. Waite's machinations eventually allowed him to assume the governorship of Bombay with Gayer under imprisonment in the Surat factory; however, Waite's personality made him unpopular with the English in Bombay and Rustam Manek. Waite was dismissed by his Council and in 1708 the intense rivalry between the two English East India Companies ended when they were amalgamated into one United Company.

=== Later Mughal-Maratha period ===
By c. 1725 a large portion of the Surat district was ruled by Marathas, and the Mughal governors of Gujarat (who were based in Ahmedabad) could no longer exercise authority south of the Narmada river. The Mughal governors of Surat city thus became essentially independent rulers with little assistance from the imperial court in Delhi. The governor of Surat, Sohrab Khan, was overthrown in 1732 in favour of Teg Beg Khan with the support of the Bohra merchant Muhammad Ali and the British East India Company. Under Teg Beg Khan's 15-year rule, the English factory in the city grew in power as a political institution. After his death in 1746 the city was in civil unrest for a decade and a half as power temporarily went to Sidi Masud, Admiral of the Mughal Fleet. In 1759, the English from Bombay captured Surat castle from Sidi Masud. For the next forty years, from 1759-1800, the English were the military commanders of Surat Castle and Admirals of the fleet, and the nominally independent Mughal nawab was in charge of city administration and customs. The Surat district outside the city was by this point completely ruled by Marathas. For the last twenty years of the 18th century trade declined as Bombay emerged as a port city. In 1800, the English government of Bombay stripped administration privileges from the Nawabs and supplied them with a pension.

== Colonial period ==
During the Quit India Movement of Mahatma Gandhi, 3,000 Koli cultivators from Matwad, Karadi, Machhad and Kothmadi in Surat District fought against British soldiers at Matwad with lathis and dharias on 21 August 1942. In this fight, four persons including one policeman died. The Kolis also snatched away four police muskets and two bayonets. The Kolis also destroyed the Jalalpore Railway Station, removed the rails and burnt down the post office. After this, the situation in the neighbouring villages of Borsad, Anand and Thasra taluqas became so aggravated that British troops marched through the villages between 22 and 24 August 1942.

During the colonial period, Surat became the emporium of India, exporting gold and cloth. Its major industries were shipbuilding and textile manufacture. The coast of the Tapti River, from Athwalines to Dumas, was specially meant for shipbuilders, who were usually Rassis. The city continued to be prosperous until the rise of Bombay (present-day Mumbai). Afterwards, Surat's shipbuilding industry declined, and Surat itself gradually declined throughout the 18th century. Between 1790 and 1791, an epidemic killed 100,000 Gujaratis in Surat. The British and Dutch both claimed control of the city, but in 1800, the British took control of Surat. The Andrews Library was built during this period.

In the great fire of 1837, more than 500 people died and caused the destruction of 9737 houses. It was the most destructive fire in the history of city.

By the middle of the 19th century, Surat had become a stagnant city with about 80,000 inhabitants. When India's railways opened, the city started becoming prosperous again. Silks, cottons, brocades, and objects of gold and silver from Surat became famous and the ancient art of manufacturing fine muslin was revived.

== Post-independence ==
After Indian independence in 1947, several educational institutions were founded including the NIT Surat and Veer Narmad South Gujarat University.

== See also ==
- Timeline of Surat
