= Shyama Prasad Mukherjee (disambiguation) =

Syama Prasad Mookerjee (also known as Shyama Prasad Mukherjee) was a 20th-century Indian politician.

Shyama Prasad Mukherjee may also refer to:

== People ==
- Shyama Prasad Mukherjee (physician), Indian physician
- Shyamaprasad Mukherjee, Indian mathematician and statistician

== Institutions ==
A number of institutions in India:

- Shyama Prasad Mukherji College, a constituent college of the University of Delhi in New Delhi
- Dr. Shyama Prasad Mukherjee University, a state university in Ranchi, Jharkhand
- Dr. Shyama Prasad Mukherjee Thermal Power Station, a coal-fired power station at Korba East in Chhattisgarh
- Dr. Syama Prasad Mookerjee Tunnel, a road tunnel connecting the towns of Chenani and Nashri in Jammu and Kashmir
- Dr. Shyama Prasad Mukherjee Indoor Stadium, an indoor stadium on the campus of Goa University at Taleigao, Goa
- Dr. Syama Prasad Mookerjee Super Speciality Hospital is a hospital that is part of the Dr. B. C. Roy Institute of Medical Sciences & Research in Paschim Medinipur, West Bengal
- Port of Kolkata, officially called the Syama Prasad Mookerjee Port, a port in Kolkata, West Bengal
- International Institute of Information Technology, Naya Raipur, officially called the Dr. Shyama Prasad Mukherjee International Institute of Information Technology, Naya Raipur, a state-funded institute in Naya Raipur, Chhattisgarh
- Sarthana Nature Park, officially called the Dr. Shyamaprasad Mukherjee Zoological Garden, a nature park in Surat, Gujarat,
- MCD Civic Centre, officially called the Dr. Shyama Prasad Mukherjee Civic Centre, an office building in New Delhi

== See also ==
- Shyam Mukherjee (disambiguation)
