= Heritage Square =

Heritage Square may refer to:

- Heritage Square (Fayetteville, North Carolina), a place including the Sandford House
- Heritage Square (Golden, Colorado), an amusement park
- Heritage Square, Phoenix, a group of original houses in downtown Phoenix, Arizona
- Heritage Square (Surat, Gujarat), a square in Chowk Bazaar, India
- Heritage Square station, on the Los Angeles County Metro Rail system

== See also ==
- Heritage Square Museum, a living history and open-air architecture museum in Los Angeles, California
- Penang Heritage Square, a proposed development in Komtar, George Town, Malaysia
