= Heritage Square (Surat, Gujarat) =

Area in Surat

Chowk Bazaar Heritage Square
- Interactive map of Chowk Bazaar Heritage Square
- Location: Chowk Bazaar, Surat, Gujarat, India
- Coordinates: 21.196266°N 72.817782°E
- Owner: Surat Municipal Corporation

Heritage Square or Chowk Bazaar Heritage Square is located in Chowk Bazaar in the old court area of Surat. Architecture in Heritage Square was built by both the British and by the Mughals.

In 2013, Surat Municipal Corporation started re-development of Heritage Square. It is currently managed by Surat Municipal Corporation.

== Themed areas and attractions ==
There are seven main attractions of Heritage Square.

=== Surat Castle ===
Surat Castle, also known as the old fort of Surat or Surat fort, was made by Khudawand Khan in the 16th century.

=== Andrews Library ===
Andrews Library is 175-year-old library in Surat.

=== J.J. Training College ===
Located in front of castle was a former English school established in 1827 from the donation by Seth Sorabji Jamshedji Jeejeebhoy. Later this school was known as "Sorabji Jamshedji Jeejeebhoy High School". In 1939 the high school was closed by government to begin a college for training primary school teachers.

=== Old Museum building ===
Old Museum was developed during the British era.

=== Anglican Church ===
Anglican Church, known as CNI Christ Church, it the oldest church of Surat. The Anglican Church was constructed in 1824 as per the western design popular in 19th century. The construction of this church building was started in 1820 under the blessings of Mount Stuart Elphiston. The main attractions of this church are a 10-foot-long (3.0 m) cross and a 300-year-old bible.

=== Kasturba Garden ===
Kastruba Gandhi Bal Udhyan is a historic garden near Anglican Church.

=== Victoria Garden (Gandhi Buag) ===
Known today as Gandhi Buag, this garden is located near Surat Castle.

== Other attractions ==
There are few more historic attractions near the Heritage Square:

- Shaniwari Bazaar
- Heritage walkway
- Mughal Sarai

== See also ==
- List of tourist attractions in Surat
