= Saraswati Mandir =

my home
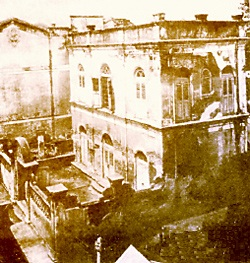
- Saraswati Mandir in 1933

- Location within Gujarat
- Former name: Sarika Sadan, Narmad Nivas
- Established: 24 August 2015
- Location: Amliran, Surat, Gujarat, India
- Coordinates: 21.194928°N 72.827817°E
- Type: writer's house museum, historic site
- Architect: Narmad
- Owner: Surat Municipal Corporation

Saraswati Mandir, also known as Sarika Sadan or Narmad House, is a writer's house museum in Surat, Gujarat, India. It was built by Gujarati poet Narmad in 1866. In 2015, the house was renovated and converted into museum and memorial house dedicated to Narmad.

== History ==
Narmad lived at Surat and he bought land opposite his ancestral house in Amliran street in Gopipura neighbourhood of Surat at the cost of ₹600 (equivalent to ₹270,000 or US$2,900 in 2023). He started construction of new house along with renovation of old one in January 1866 which was completed in September 1866. He named it Saraswati Mandir and used it for writing and research. The construction of house exacerbated his financial problem.

The house was later purchased by Jatashankar Trivedi. Subsequently, it was purchased by Gajendrashankar Lalshankar Pandya as his eldest daughter Sarika insisted to purchase it. He expanded the house and constructed extension in the southern one-third part and added tin roof above the house. He renamed it Sarika Sadan after the name of his eldest daughter. After his death, his wife Kailash continued to reside there. They wanted to sell the house but the local residents and Narmad's fans opposed and wanted it to be converted into museum or library. The Surat Municipal Corporation purchased it and handed over it to Kavi Narmad Yugavart Trust which was dedicated to publication and preservation of works of Narmad, on 24 August 1992, the birth anniversary of Narmad. They partially restored and converted it into memorial but later handed it back to Surat Municipal Corporation. The house stayed neglected until some renovation in 2010s.

The Surat Municipal Corporation started renovation, restoration and preservation of house to its original form in 2014. They removed the extension and replaced decayed wooden parts, roof and flooring. The renovated house was converted into museum and articles and information about Narmad's life, family and works are put on display. The ground floor has the bust of Narmad. It also houses his books and some furniture used by him. The project cost ₹35 lakh (US$37,000).

The museum was opened to public on 24 August 2015, the 182nd birth anniversary of Narmad.

=== Replica ===
The replica of Sarika Sadan was constructed at the Veer Narmad South Gujarat University at the cost of ₹1.5 crore (US$160,000) and named Narmad Smriti Bhavan. It was also opened on 24 August 2015. It houses handwritten manuscripts and some belongings of Narmad.

== Architecture ==
The original single storeyed house was spread in an area of 102 square metres (1,100 sq ft). It had framework made of wood and the walls made of bricks. The walls were plastered with limestone. Its floor was tiled with Kota stone with shiny finish. It had sloped roof with Mangalore tiles.

== See also ==
- List of tourist attractions in Surat
