= Zervavra =

- Village
- Country: India
- State: Gujarat
- District: Surat

Government
  - Body: Zervavra Gram Panchayat

Languages
  - Official: Gujarati, Hindi
- Time zone: UTC+5:30 (IST)
- PIN: 394245
- Telephone code: 91261-XXX-XXXX
- Vehicle registration: GJ
- Website: gujaratindia.com

Zervavra is a village located in Surat district, Gujarat, India.

== See also ==
- List of tourist attractions in Surat
