= Udhana–Navsari Highway =

Highway in Gujurat, India

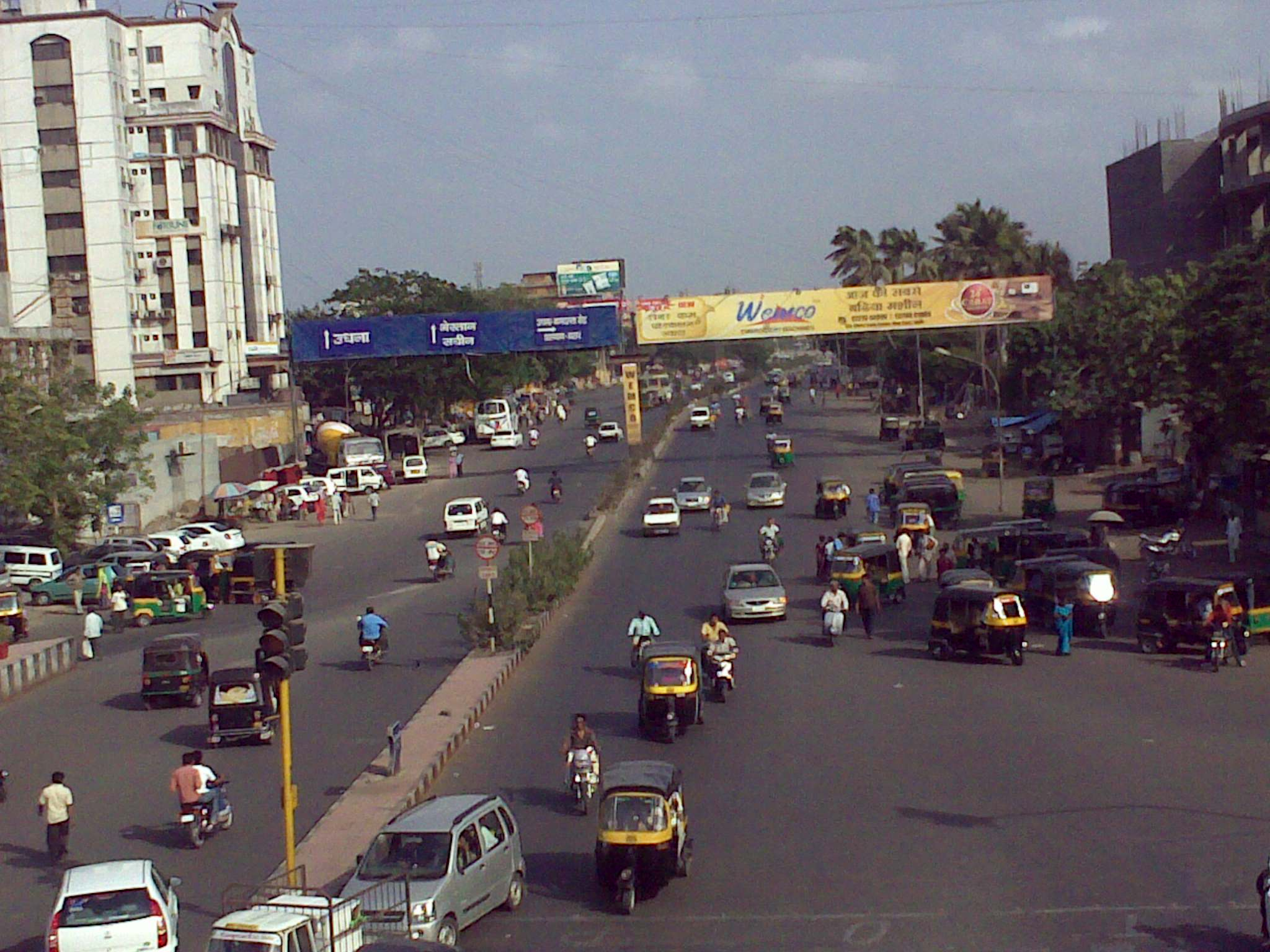
Busy Udhana-Navsari Highway

The Udhana–Navsari Highway, colloquially the "U.N. Road", connects the city of Surat with Navsari, the capital of Parsi headquarters in the state of Gujarat, India. It is a major artery of commerce and public transport, and is witnessing a major construction boom along its route to Navsari. In July 2025, some of the main roads including in Navsari, were closed temporarily due to heavy rains. In June 2025, a flyover was also planned on the Surat-Navsari road at Udhana tran rasta at a cost of Rs.89.1 crore.

== See also ==
List of tourist attractions in Surat
