= Chauta Bazaar =

Market in Gujarat, India

Chauta Bazaar is one of the oldest market of Surat, Gujarat, India. Chauta Bazaar's history dates back to early 1700s. The present-day Mota Mandir in Chauta was known as Vaishnao Haveli. There were shops surrounding the Haveli where the women visiting the temple would go shopping for utensils, clothes, cosmetics, groceries and other day-to-day household goods. All the shops were owned by the Vaishnao traders.

== See also ==
- List of tourist attractions in Surat
