= Athwalines =

- suburb
- Interactive map of Athwalines
- Coordinates: 21°10′46″N 72°48′09″E
- Country: India
- State: Gujarat
- District: Surat

Government
  - Body: Surat Municipal Corporation

Languages
  - Official: Gujarati, Hindi, English
- Time zone: UTC+5:30 (IST)
- PIN: 395001
- Telephone code: 91261-XXX-XXXX
- Vehicle registration: GJ
- Lok Sabha constituency: Surat
- Civic agency: Surat Municipal Corporation

Athwalines is a suburban area located in the South West Zone of Surat. Athwalines is under the surat municipality corporation (SMC) and is a well developed area in surat.

== See also ==
- Surat
- List of tourist attractions in Surat
