= Jagdishchandra Bose Aquarium =

Jagdish Chandra Bose Aquarium
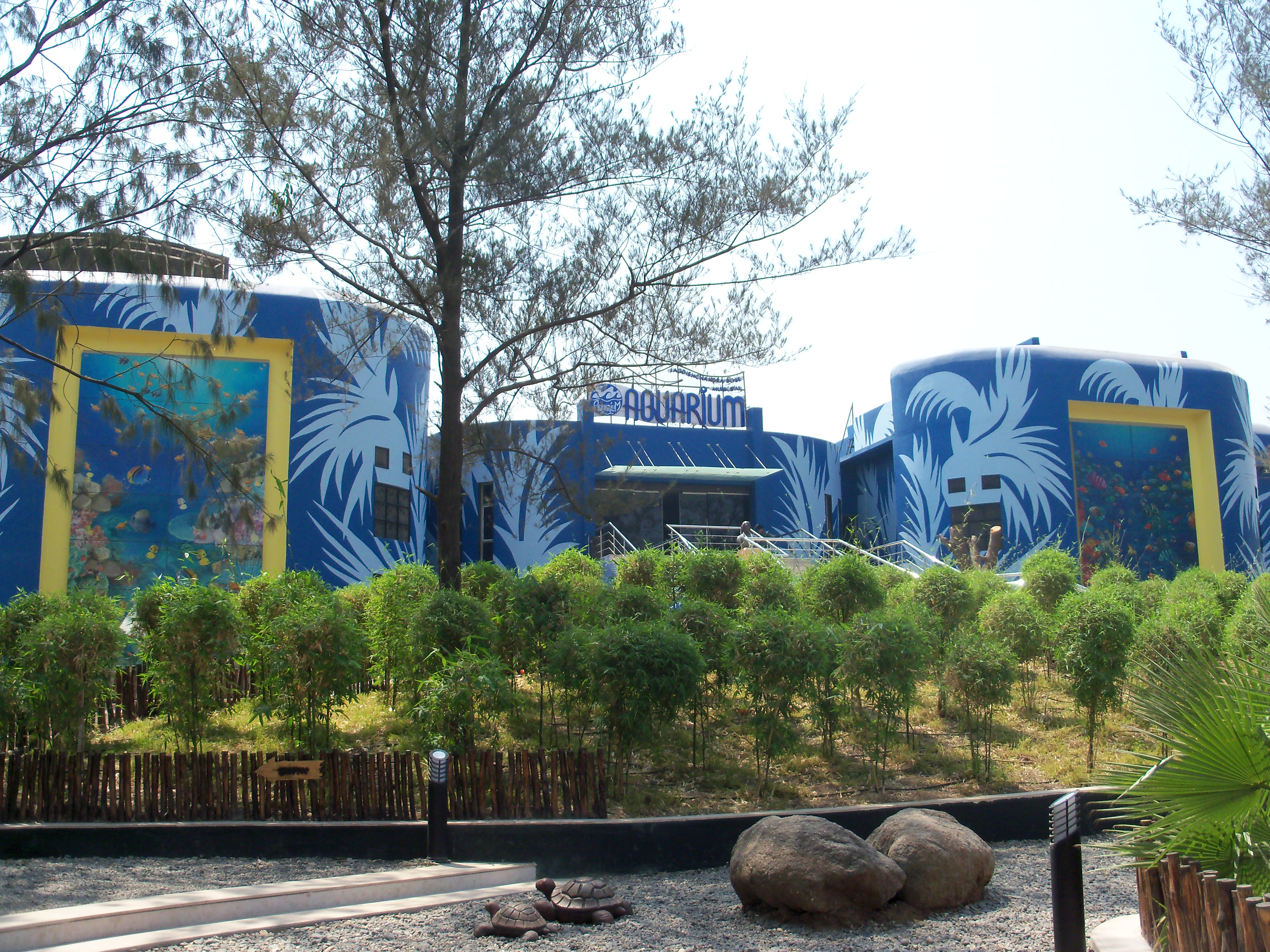
- Jagdish Chandra Bose Aquarium
- Location: Pal, Surat, Gujarat India
- No. of species: 100+

Jagdish Chandra Bose Aquarium is situated in the Pal area of Surat, Gujarat, India. It is the first multidisciplinary underwater aquarium of its kind in the country and named after the Bengali scientist Jagadish Chandra Bose. Inaugurated on 1 March 2014 by Narendra Modi

The aquarium will be the home of more than 100 species of fish, from fresh, brackish and marine waters, in 52 tanks. Aquascaping is underway as per the species' requirements, and each tank will replicate a collection of species' natural ecosystem.

The 25,722 square meter space will cost 20 Crores Indian Rupees. During the first phase of aquarium construction, a jellyfish pool and a shark tank will be key attractions. The shark tank will be two floors high (40 feet long, 30 feet wide) and hold 700,000 liters. It will house two sharks. In the second phase, a dolphin tunnel pool habitat will be added.

== Building ==
Outside of the aquarium is a large whale skeleton is surrounded by a garden. The aquarium has two floors, containing many small tanks and a larger tank.

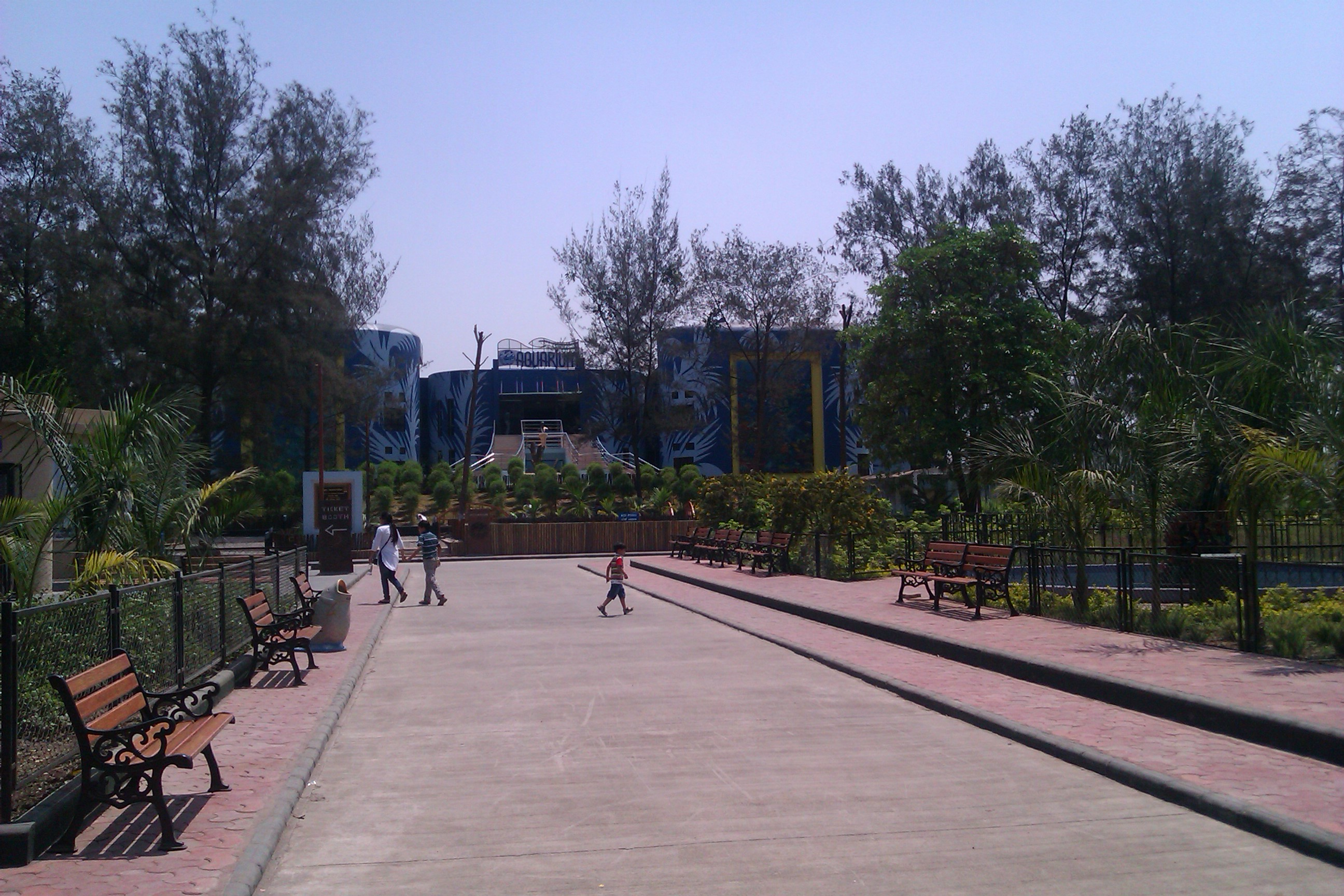
outside view of aquarium

== Species ==
Resident species include: Gold fish, Man-eater Piranhas, as well as other local and exotic species. Various small fish and sharks are seen in the large tank; while fish in the small tank include: Alligator Gar, Cichlid, Ghost Fish, Lionfish, Starfish and Stingrays. In the aquarium, the following can be found: American Lobster, Moray Eel, Snowflake Eel and Turtles.

== Gallery ==
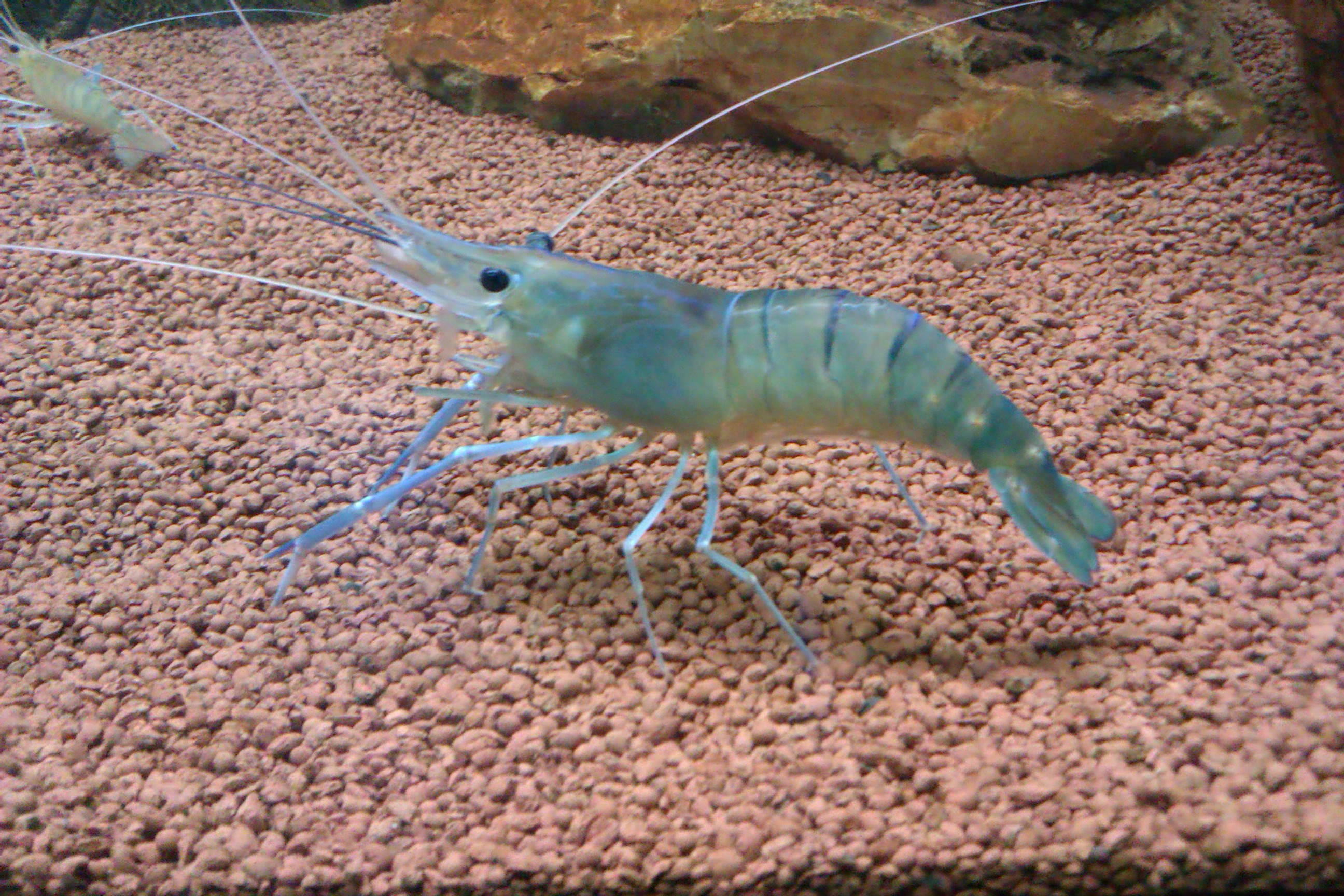
Lobster

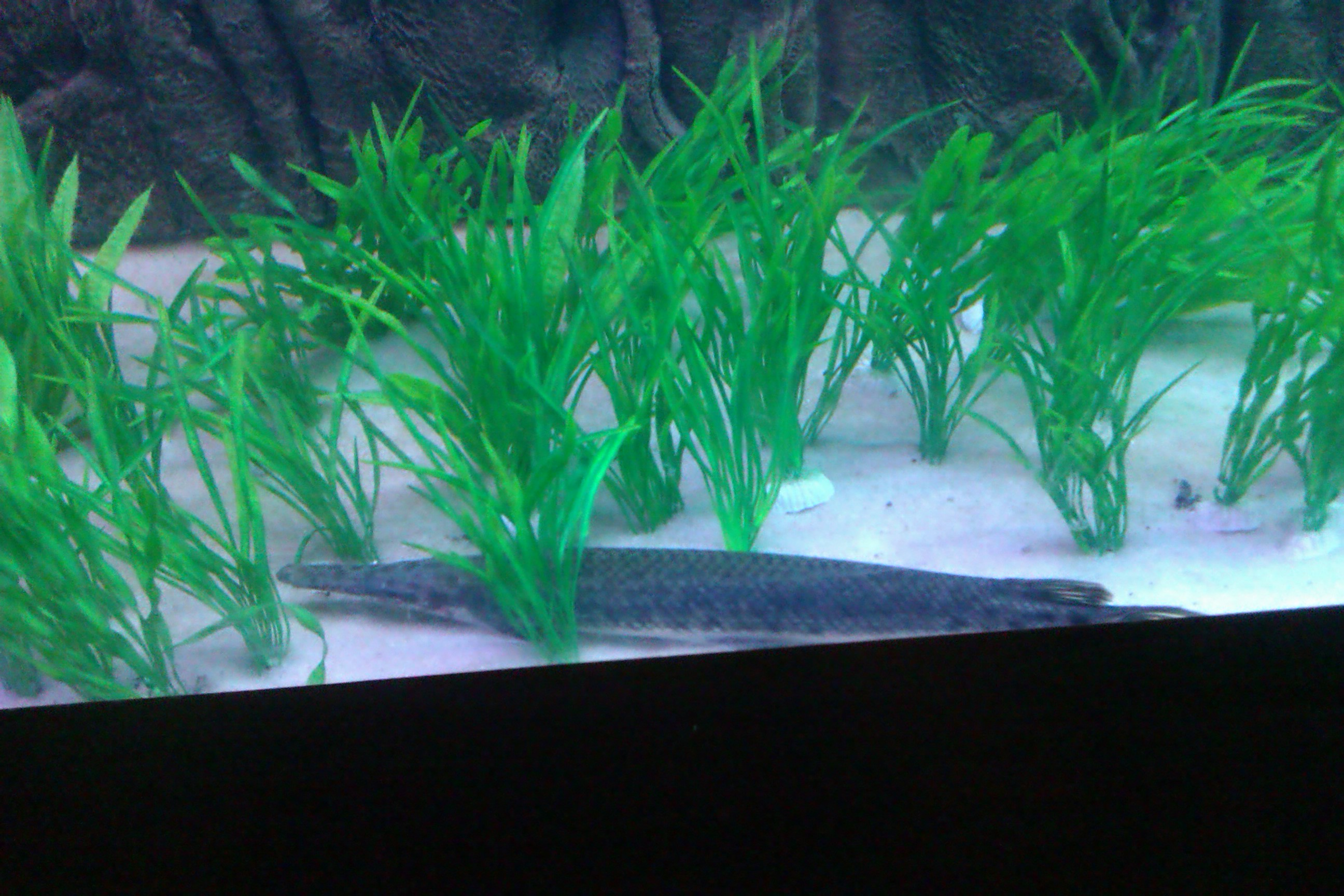
Alligator Gar

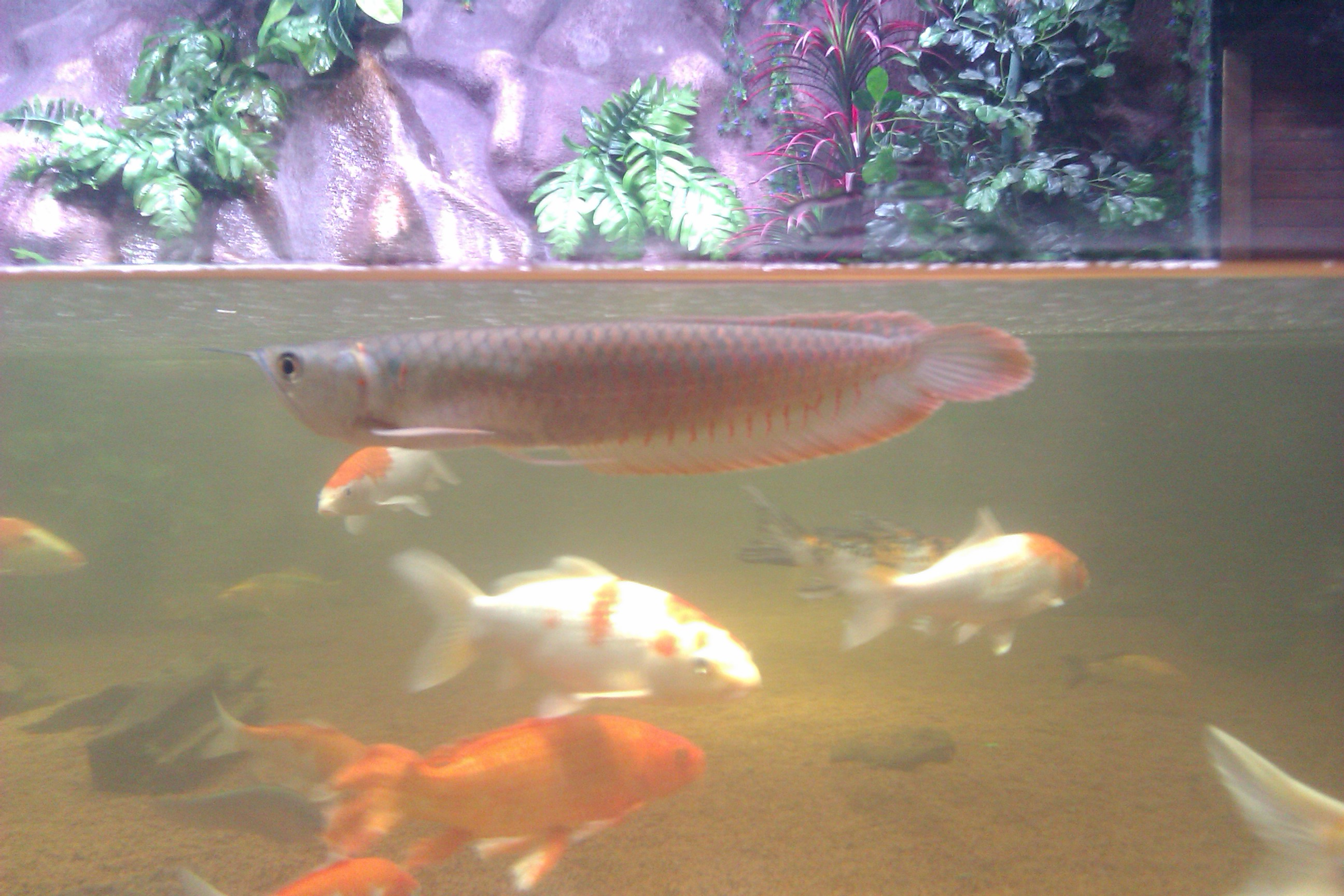
Freshwater Fish

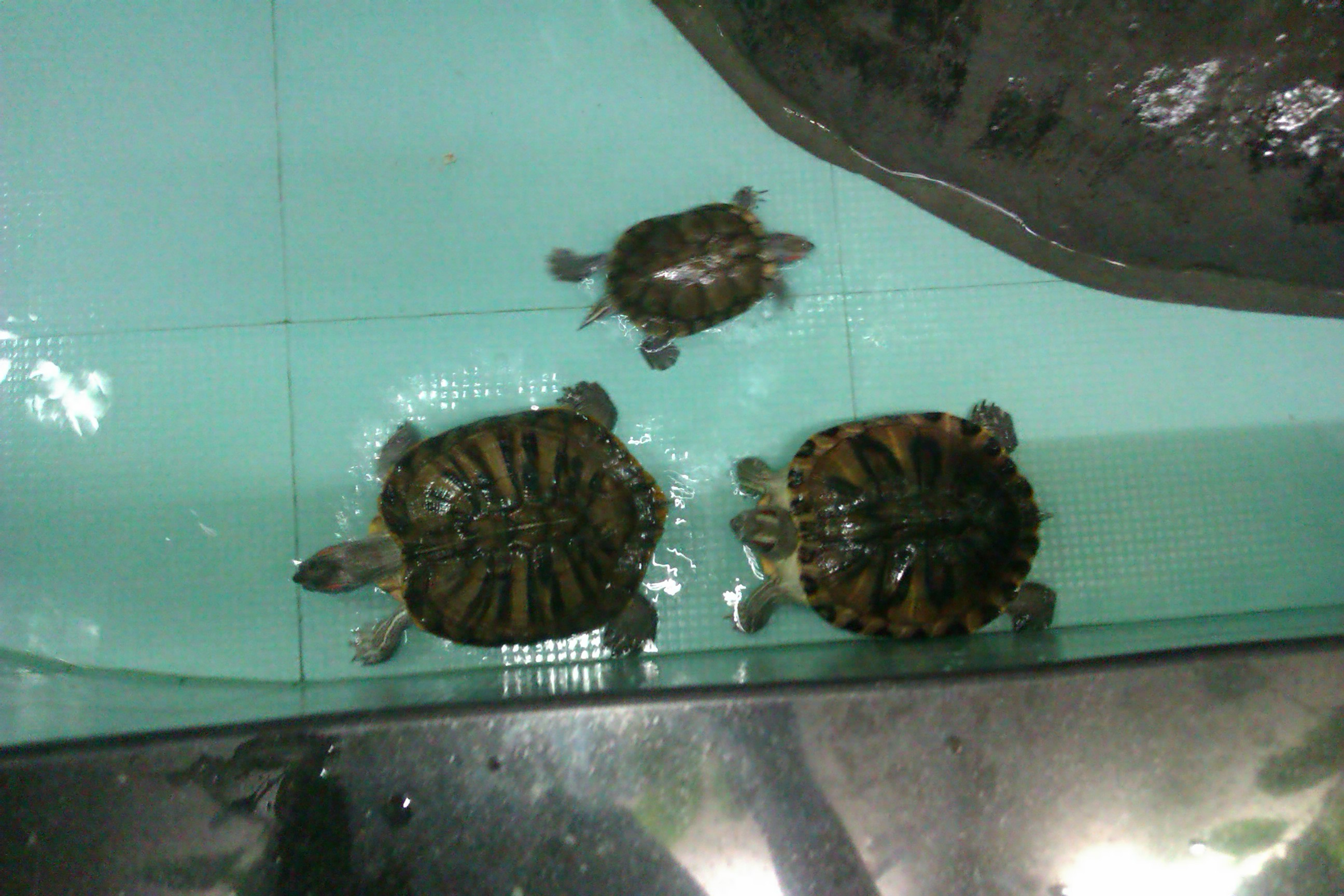
Turtle

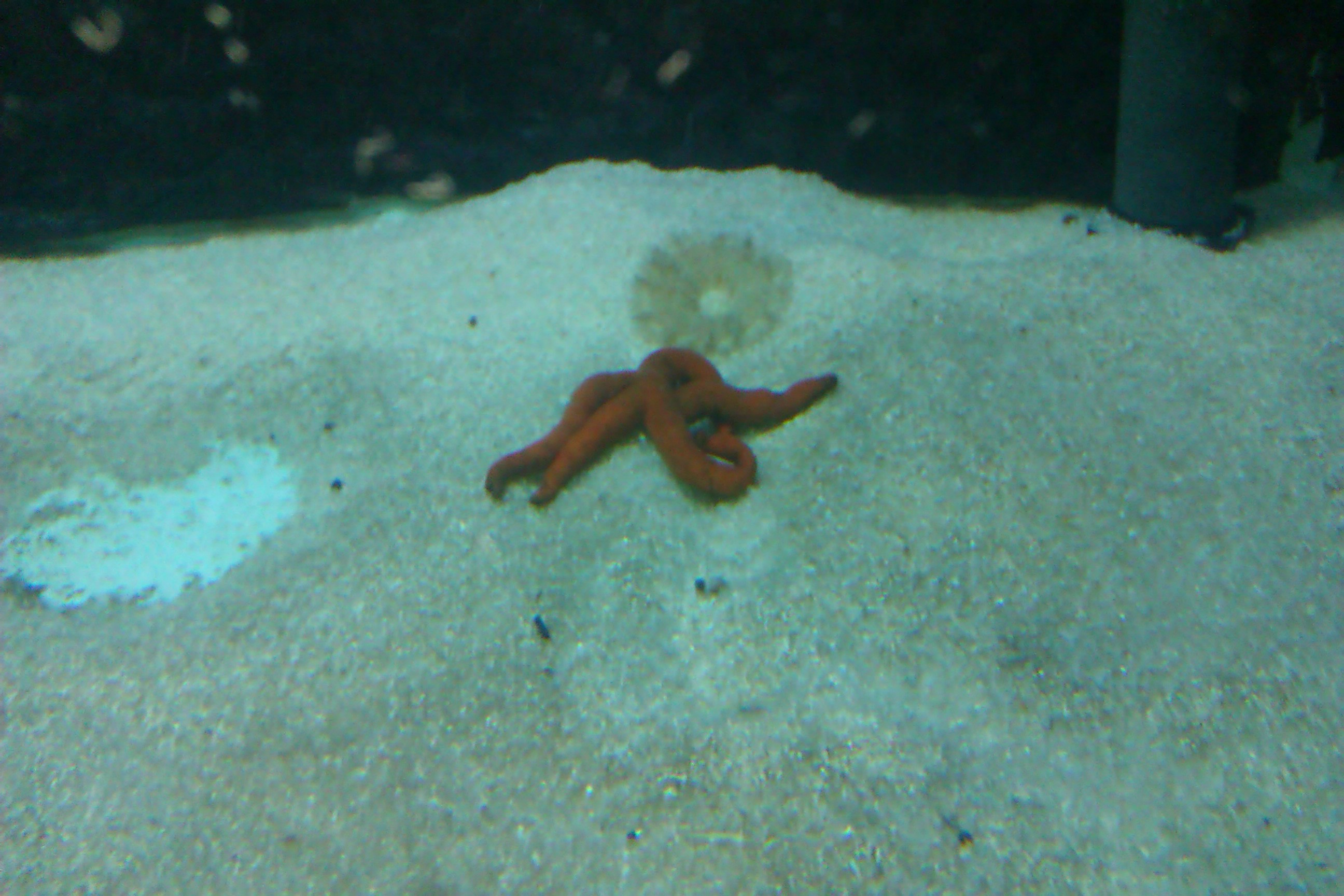
StarFish

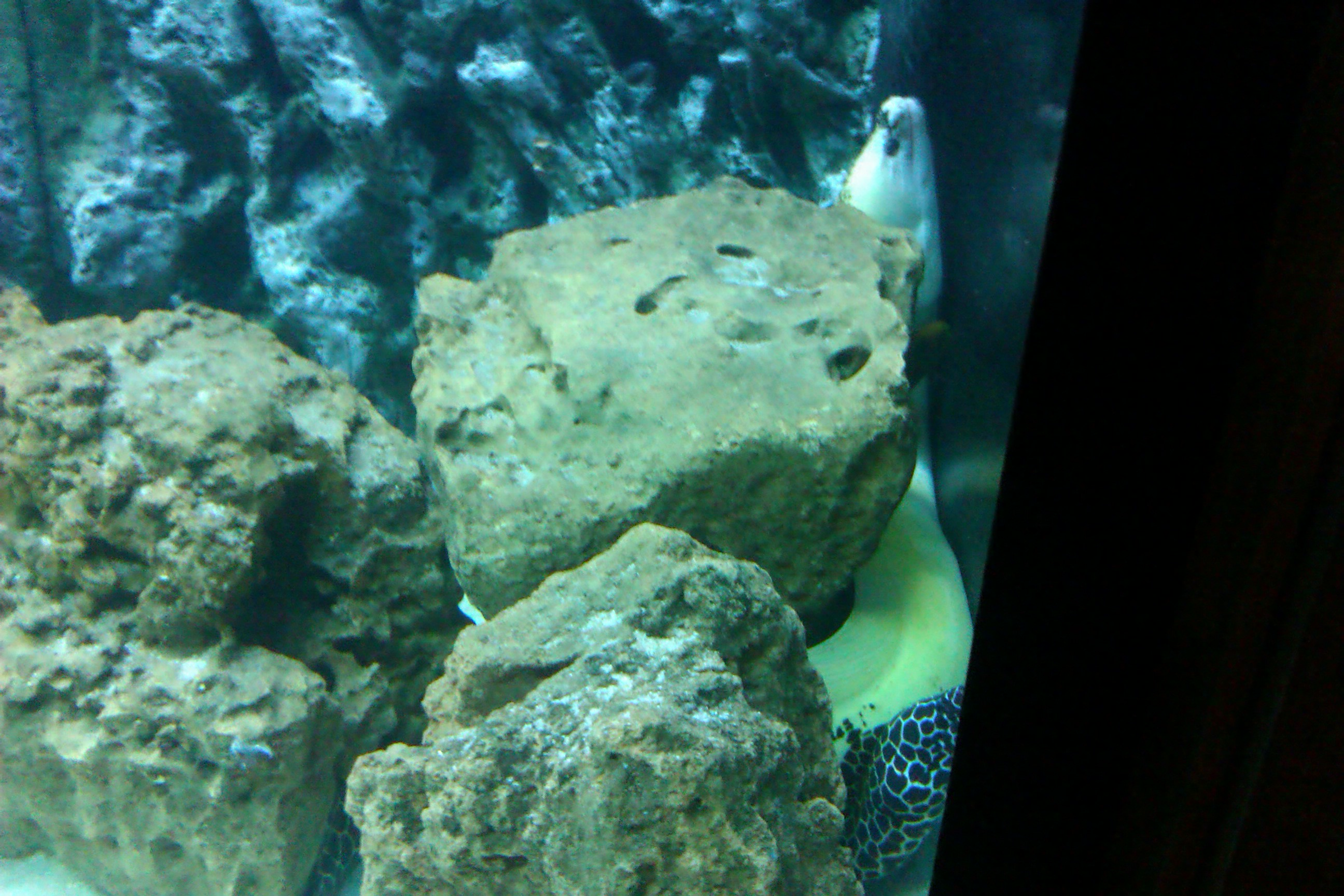
Moray Eel

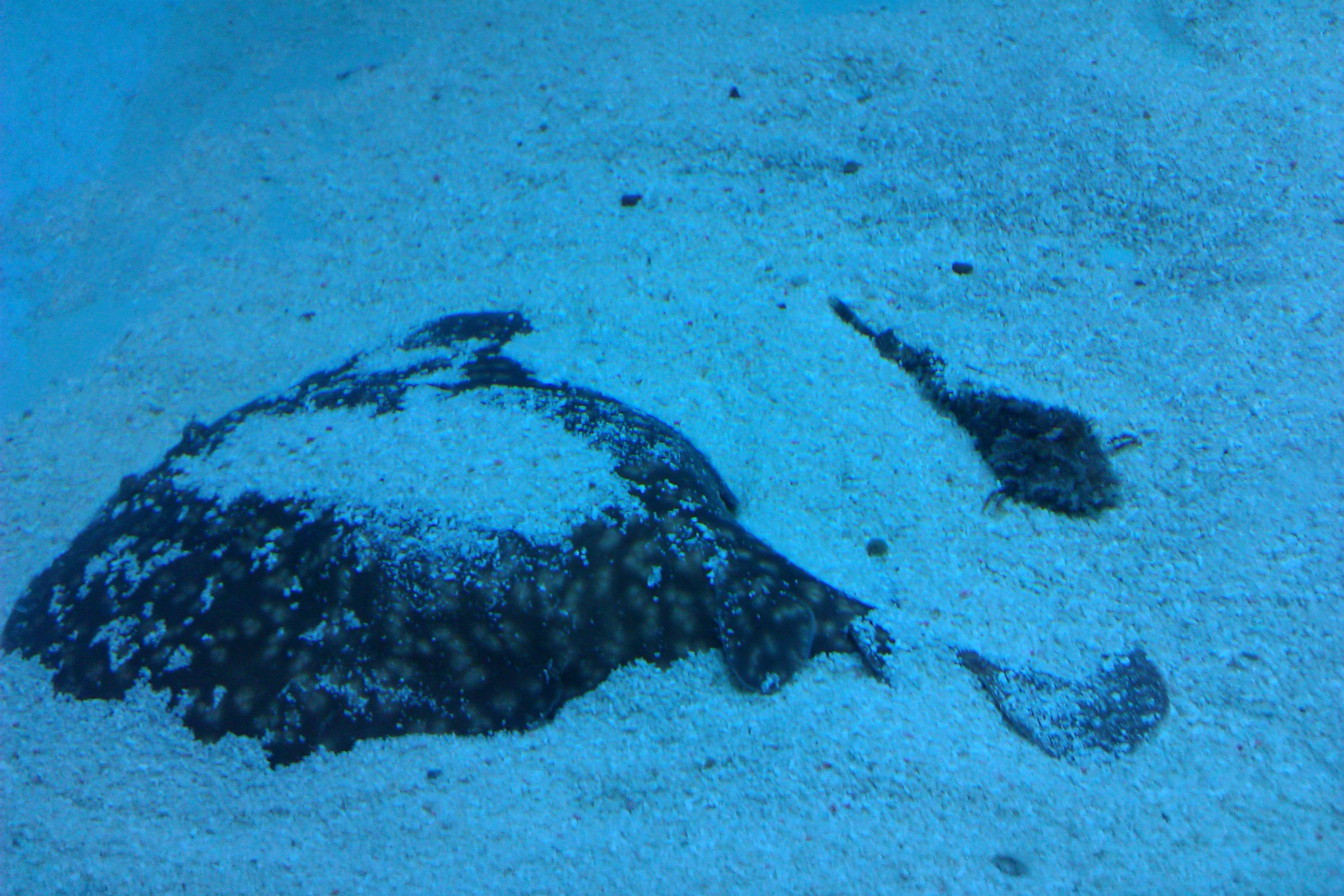
Stingray

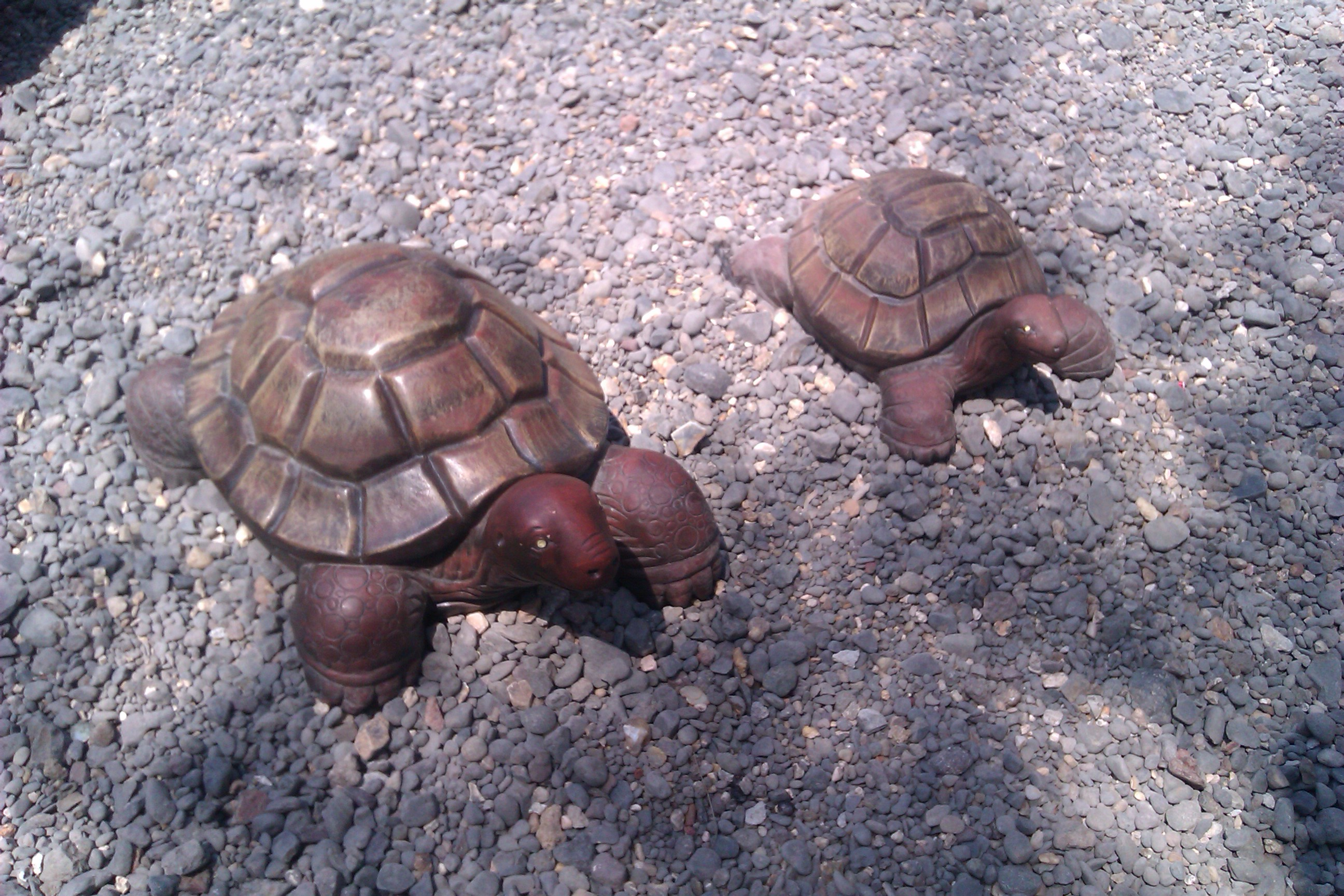
Replica Of Tortoise

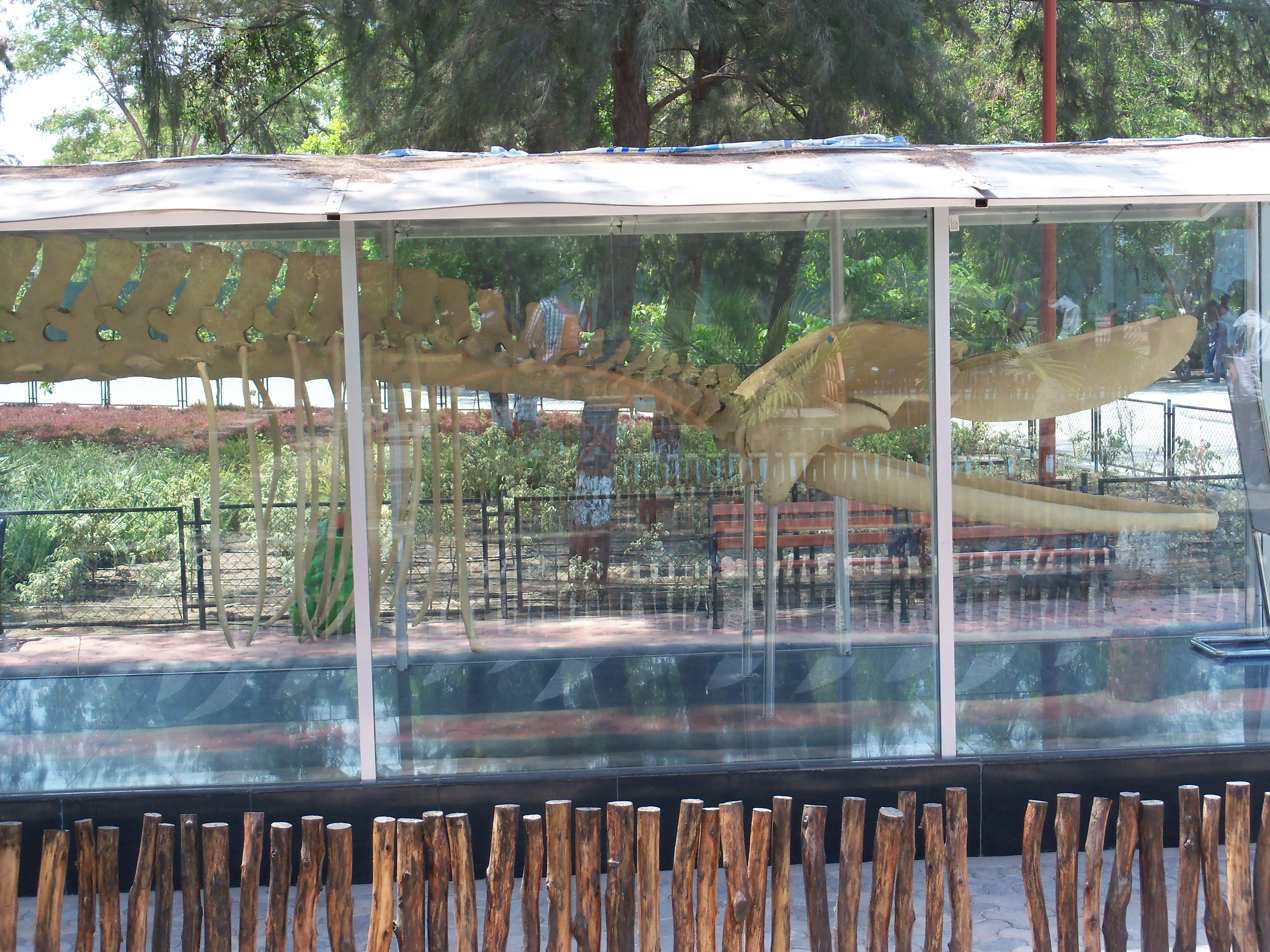
Skeleton of Bryde's Blue Whale

== See also ==
- List of tourist attractions in Surat
