= Science Centre, Surat =

Science Centre Surat
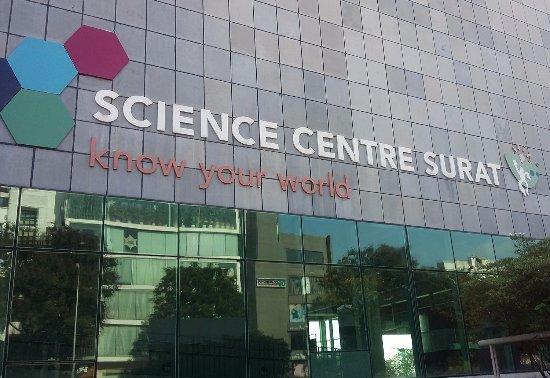
- Established: 29 November 2009; 16 years ago
- Location: Surat, Gujarat, India
- Type: Science and Technology Museum
- Visitors: 928,047 (as of June 2022)
- Curator: Bhamini Mahida
- Website: www.suratmunicipal.gov.in/Services/ScienceCentre/ScienceCentreHome

Science Centre, Surat is a multi-facility complex in Surat, Gujarat, India built by the Surat Municipal Corporation in 2009, the first of its type in western India. The complex houses a Science Centre, museum, an art gallery, an auditorium, an Amphitheatre and a planetarium. It has been designed by Ahmedabad-based architectural firm, HCP Design, Planning and Management Pvt. Ltd.

== The Complex ==
The complex covers a total area of 21,800 sq. m. and was built at the cost of ₹ 50.24 crores. It has underground parking facility for 112 four-wheelers and 210 two-wheelers. It has two 400 tonne vapor absorption chiller plants for air conditioning. The complex also houses a rooftop solar power plant which generates about 1.14 lakh KW of power. In addition, the complex also houses a restaurant.

In its first three months of opening, the Science Centre had nearly 30,000 visitors.

=== Science Centre ===
The science centre forms the main part of the complex. It houses a Fun Science Gallery which shows science exhibits. Dedicated galleries for Space, Textile and Diamond are also proposed.

=== Sardar Vallabhbhai Patel Museum ===
The Sardar Vallabhbhai Patel Museum has about 8400 antiquities in wide categories of wood, porcelain, copper, bronze, textile, coins, paintings, miniature paintings, manuscripts, sculptures etc. The museum was developed to showcase the past of Surat. The museum also has a small auditorium to screen documentaries on the history of Surat.

In 2009, designers S. Team Design Services received the IIIDMK Award (Western region) in the Public Spaces Category for the SVP Museum. They were commended for the National Award in the Institution Category.

=== Amphitheatre ===
The complex also houses an amphitheatre. It is circular shaped with stepped seating. The seating capacity of the theatre is 250. The theatre is used to organise cultural shows and small concerts.

=== Planetarium ===
Located on the first floor, the Planetarium is built in the shape of a sphere 16.30 metre in diameter. It has a seating capacity of 140. The digital theatre of the planetarium facilitates the observation of stars, moon, planets and other heavenly bodies which are displayed on the full dome. High resolution projectors which use Digistar 3 technology with digital audio system are used. The show is currently in three languages – Hindi, Gujarati and English.

=== Art Gallery ===
Located opposite to Sardar Vallabhbhai Patel Museum, the art gallery is used for art exhibitions in the city.

=== Auditorium ===
The Auditorium is housed in the mezzanine level of the Complex at the southern end of the main building. It has a seating capacity of 260. The auditorium is used for seminars, lectures and meetings.

== See also ==
- List of tourist attractions in Surat
- Swami Vivekananda Planetarium, Mangalore
- Kavi Narmad Central Library
- List of science centers#Asia
- Science Centre, Patan
