= Shyam Mukherjee =

Shyam Mukherjee may refer to:

- Shyam Mukherjee (politician), Indian politician
- Shyam Mukherjee (filmmaker), Indian filmmaker and film editor

== See also ==
- Shyama Prasad Mukherjee (disambiguation)
