= Tapi Riverfront =

Waterfront of Tapti River, Surat, India

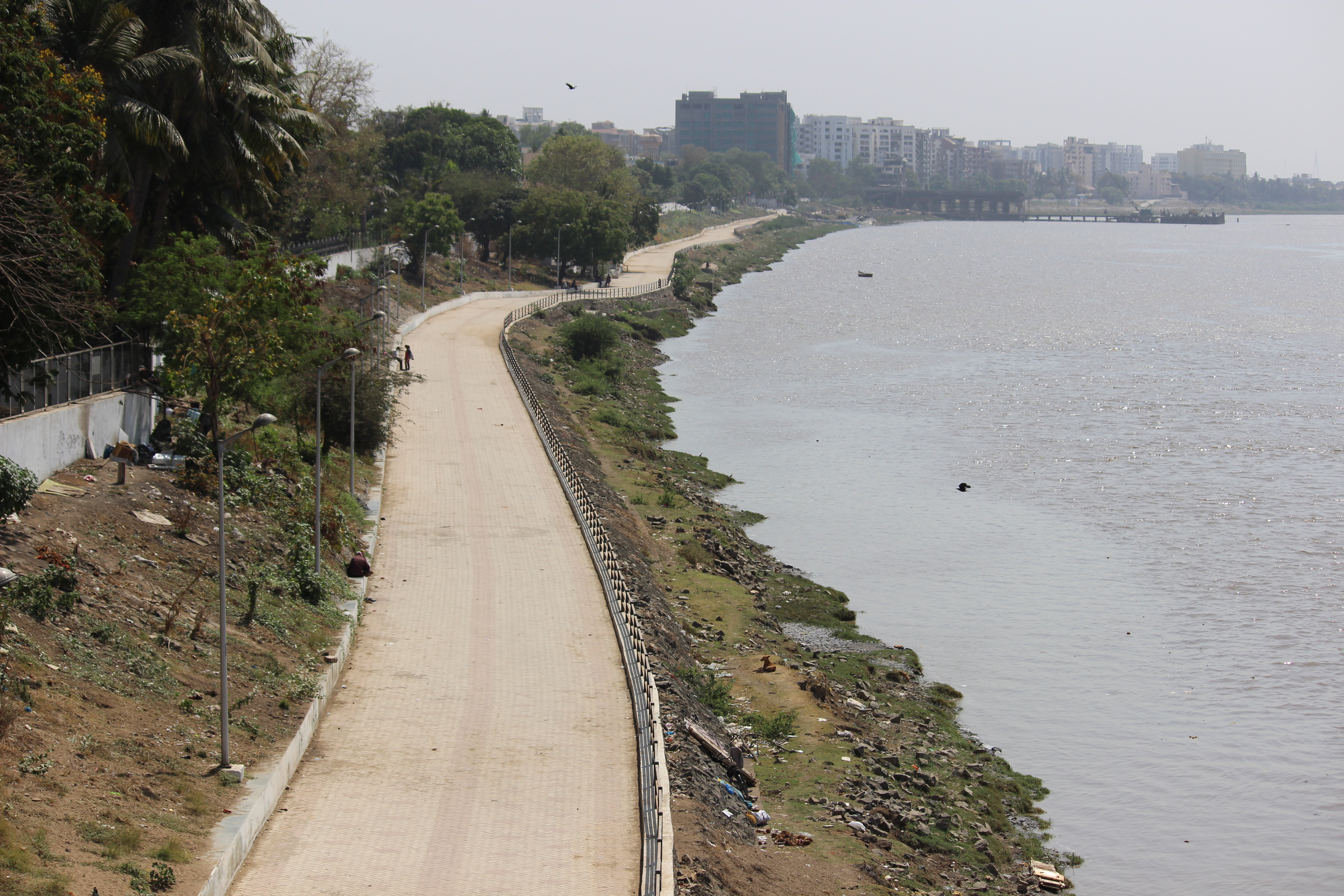
- Location: Surat, Gujarat, India
- Status: Under construction
- Use: Urban development

Tapi Riverfront is a waterfront being developed along the banks of Tapi River in Surat, India. The State Government had cleared 54 hectares of land on the riverbanks for the development of a riverfront project.

== See also ==
- List of tourist attractions in Surat
- Weir-cum Causeway
- Cable Bridge Surat
