= Nanpura Parsi Library =

Nanpura Parsi Library and Reading Room
- Location: Navdi Bandar Road, Opposite Lal Bhai Complex, Nanpura, Surat, Gujarat, India 395001

Other information
- Director: Manav Vikas Sansthan Trust

Nanpura Parsi Library and Reading Room is the oldest public library in Surat, formerly known for a large collection of books related to Parsi culture.

Due to dwindling interest in the library, it eventually shut down. The contents of the library were sent to libraries in Navsari and Mumbai as well as to other libraries under the control of the Surat Parsi Punchayet.

The Manav Vikas Sansthan, a trust running other libraries in Surat, took over operations in 1980 after the Nanpura Parsi Library was closed. It now only consists of weekly periodicals and newspapers, in English, Gujarati and Hindi

== See also ==
- List of tourist attractions in Surat
