= Morarji Desai Setu =

Bridge in India

- Coordinates: 21°13′08.2″N 72°48′15.1″E
- Locale: Katargam - Rander, Surat, Gujarat
- Other name(s): Weir-cum Causeway
- Named for: Morarji Desai
- Owner: Surat Municipal Corporation

Characteristics
- Design: Causeway cum Weir
- Material: R.C.C.
- Total length: 580 metres (1,900 ft): Weir - Gated portion - 98 metres (322 ft); Un-gated portion - 482 metres (1,581 ft)
- Width: 10 metres (33 ft)
- No. of spans: 16 - Gated Portion

History
- Construction end: 1995

Morarji Desai Setu is a weir-cum-causeway on the Tapi River in Surat, Gujarat, India. It connects Rander and Katargam neighbourhoods. It was built in 1995 at an approximate cost of ₹35 crore (equivalent to ₹209 crore or US$24 million in 2023).

== See also ==
- Tapi Riverfront
- Cable Bridge Surat
- Gaurav Path
