= Gopi Talav =

Lake in Surat, Gujarat, India

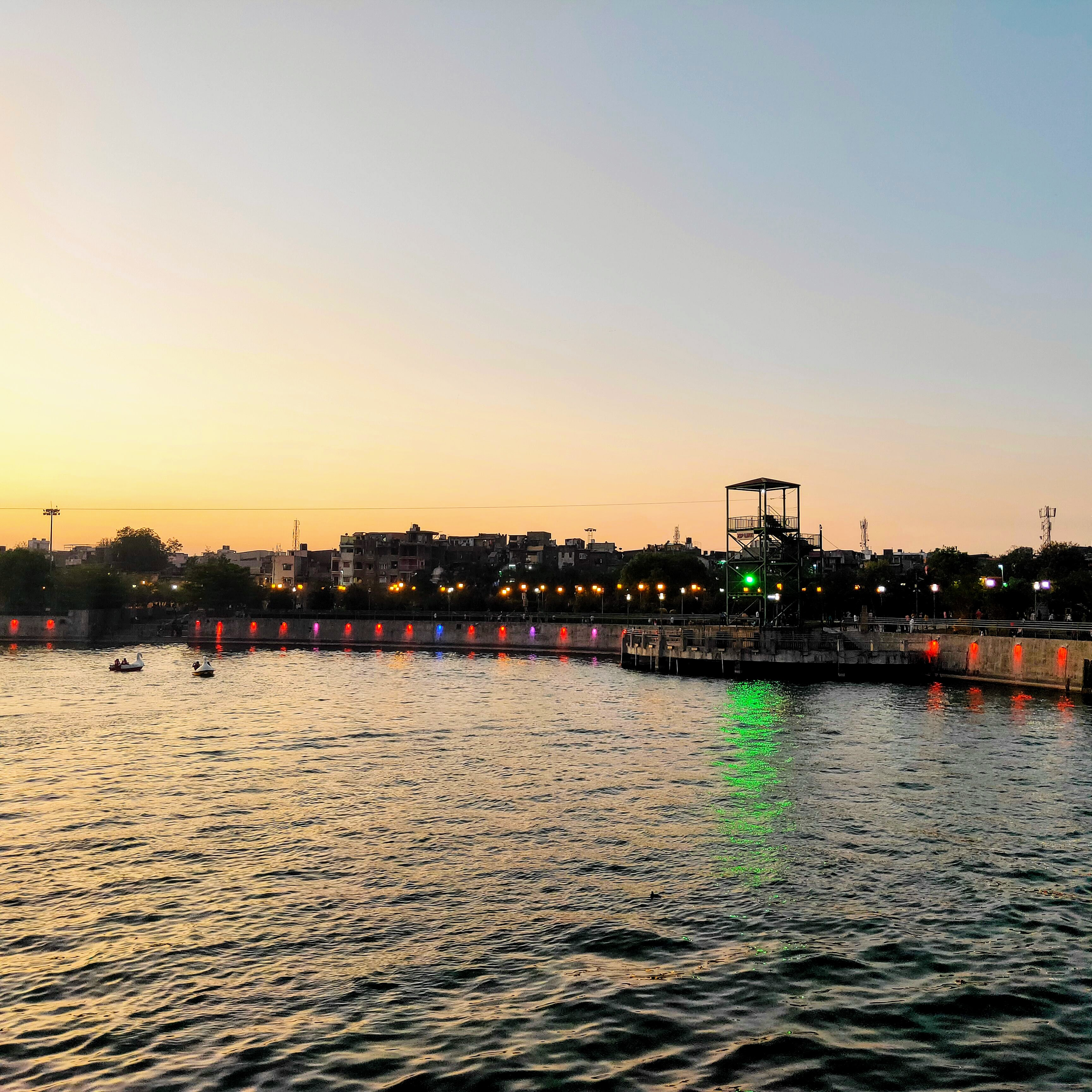
- Gopi Talav in the evening

- Location within Gujarat
- Location: Surat, India
- Coordinates: 21°11′18.9″N 72°49′45.8″E
- Type: Artificial lake
- Etymology: Malik Gopi
- Catchment area: 35,300 m^{2} (0.0136 sq mi)
- Managing agency: Rajhans Group (Movaliya Brothers),Surat Municipal Corporation
- Built: 1510
- Max. length: 212 metres (696 ft)
- Water volume: 120,000,000 L (26,000,000 imp gal; 32,000,000 US gal)
- Settlements: Surat
- Website: Surat Tourism - Gopi Talav

Gopi Talav or Gopi Lake is a lake in the Gopipura locality in the city of Surat in Gujarat state of India. It was built circa 1510 CE by Malik Gopi, who was an affluent merchant and governor of Surat during the Gujarat Sultanate. In 2012, the lake was renovated by Surat Municipal Corporation and the area surrounding was redeveloped as a recreational facility.

== History ==
Malik Gopi, a Brahmin merchant,^{[Note 1]} settled in Surat and the development of the city has been attributed to his contributions. The area he developed was called Gopipura, in his honour and the king of Gujarat^{[Note 2]} gave him the title of "Malik". The town that he developed was still unnamed and consulting astrologers he proposed to name it "Suraj" or "Suryapur". The king disliking the Hindu inclination of the name altered it to "Surat" (meaning headings of the chapters of the Quran). Gopi also finds mentions in Portuguese literature as "Lord of Surat and Bharuch".

In 1573, Emperor Akbar had set up his military base camp near the lake during the siege of Surat.

Sanskrit poet Vinayavijaya (1613–1681) in his poem "Indudutam" calls this lake a "fine art emerged from the churning of oceans." The lake also finds mentions in travelogues of European visitors. British traveler Peter Mundy who arrived in Surat in September 1628 describes the lake as "the Great Tancke of Surat," and "admirable for its workemannshipp and bignes". Dutch geographer Joannes de Laet's 1631 Latin works mention this lake to have been cut out of a rock. Johan Albrecht de Mandelslo, a German adventurer who landed in Surat in 1638 describes the vastness of the lake along with steps surrounding it and mentions the house that stood at the centre; wrongly calling it "the tomb of the builder of this magnificent structure". Portuguese Jesuit Manoel Godinho toured the Surat region in 1662–63 and mentions two wells outside the city used to supply drinking water and this is implied as a reference to two cisterns of the lake. The lake also finds mentions in the chronicles of Italian traveler Pietro della Valle as "Gopi Telau". Sir Thomas Herbert, who toured India on various occasions in 15th century, mentions the lake to have been used to hold rain water for drinking purpose.

In 1666, French traveler Jean de Thévenot in his writings notes the absence of restorations required for the lake. By 1674, the lake had been ignored and had turned dry turning to ruins by 1717. Further in the 20th century, the steps surrounding this dry lake made it look like a huge amphitheater.

== Renovation and redevelopment ==
Map of Gopi Talav and its amenities.

In 2012, the lake and the surrounding areas were renovated at the budget of around ₹22 crore (US$2.3 million). Around 90,000 square metres (970,000 sq ft) of land was renovated, where the 212 metres (696 ft) diameter lake covered almost 35,000 square metres (380,000 sq ft) of area. The lake can hold 120,000,000 litres (26,000,000 imp gal; 32,000,000 US gal) of water. The renovated surroundings include amphitheater and fountain plaza. The area has been divided into seven zones; the diamond zone, food zone, environment zone, history zone, communal harmony zone, textile zone and Surat nu Jaman. The Surat Municipal Corporation has outsourced the operation and maintenance of these to a local company called Rajhans Entertainment which would develop an amusement park called "Future Zone" and also pay an annual royalty of ₹30 lakh (US$31,000) to the Corporation. The first phase was inaugurated on 5 December 2015 by Chief Minister of Gujarat, Anandiben Patel.

The redevelopment of the lake and the park around it is based on the renovation of Kankaria Lake in Ahmedabad. Water to the lake will be piped from the Tapi river on whose banks the city lies.

== Gallery ==
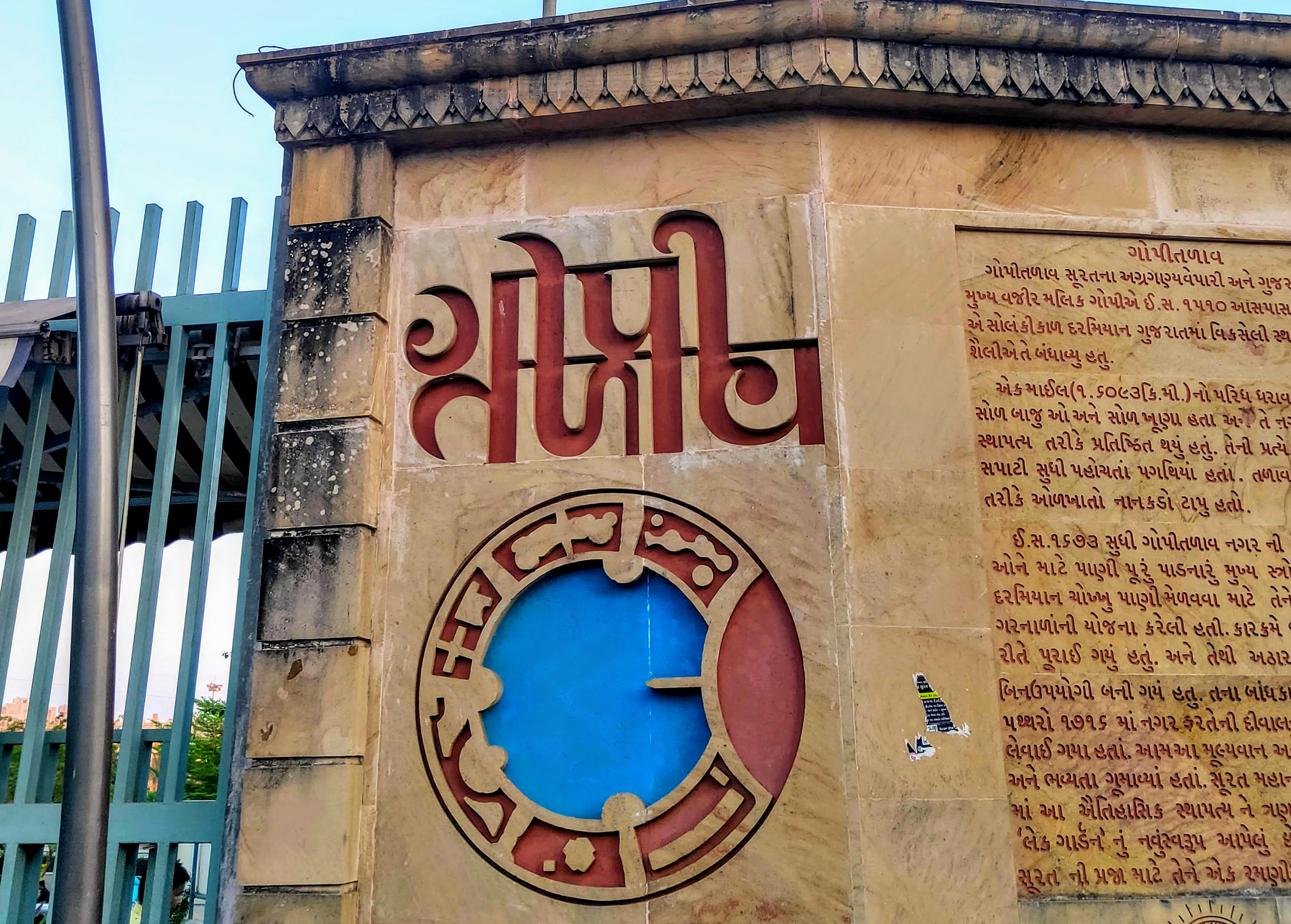
Entrance

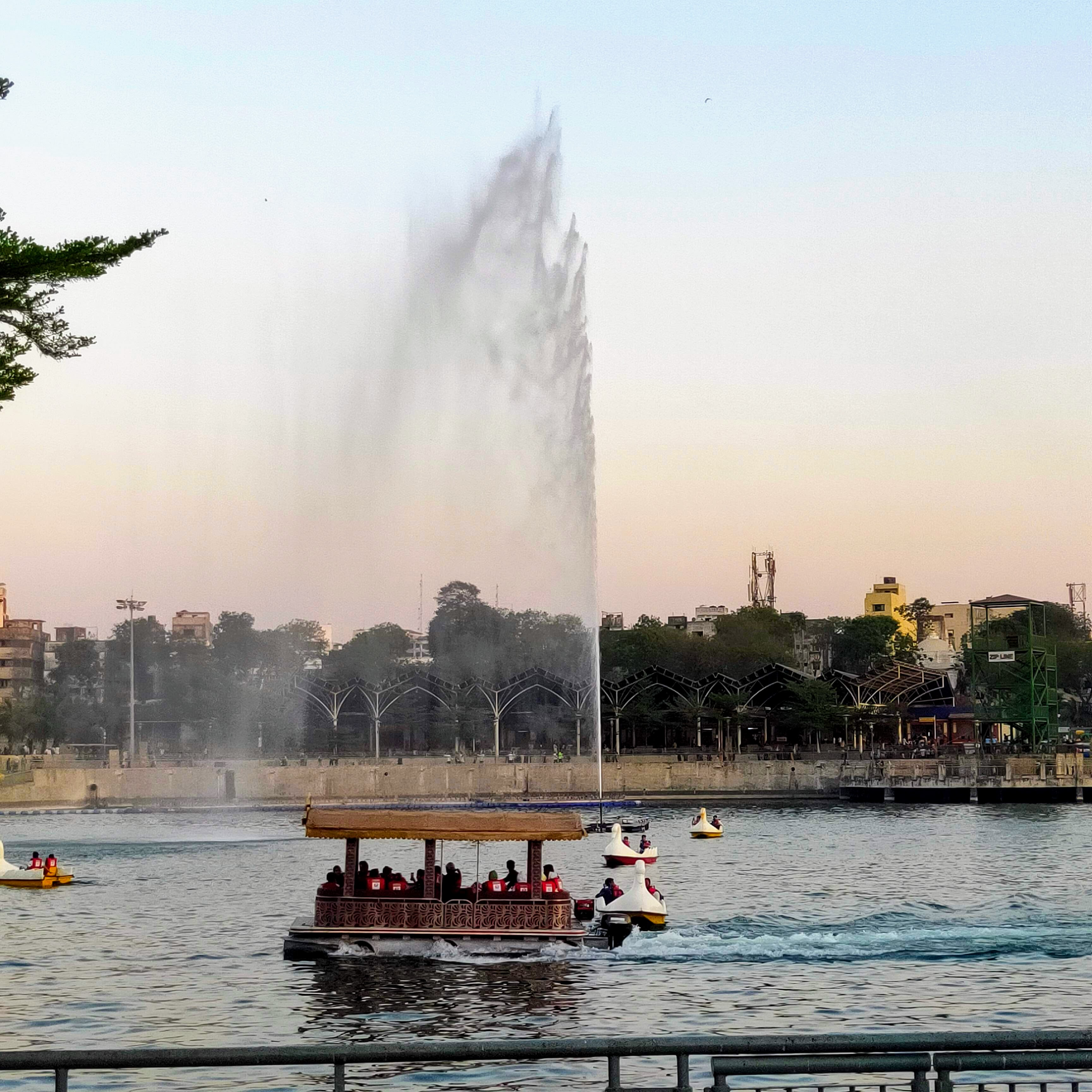
Fountain and Boating

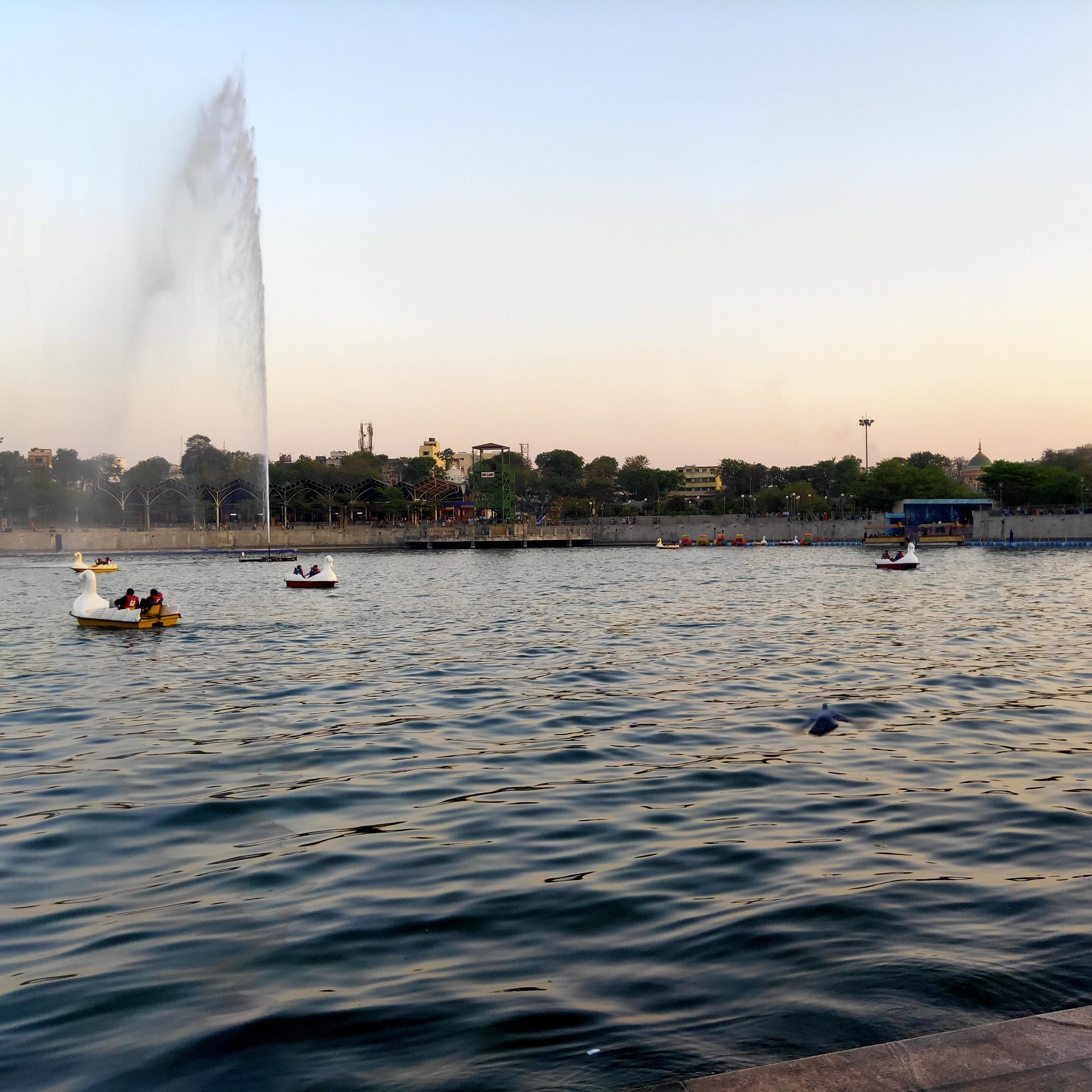

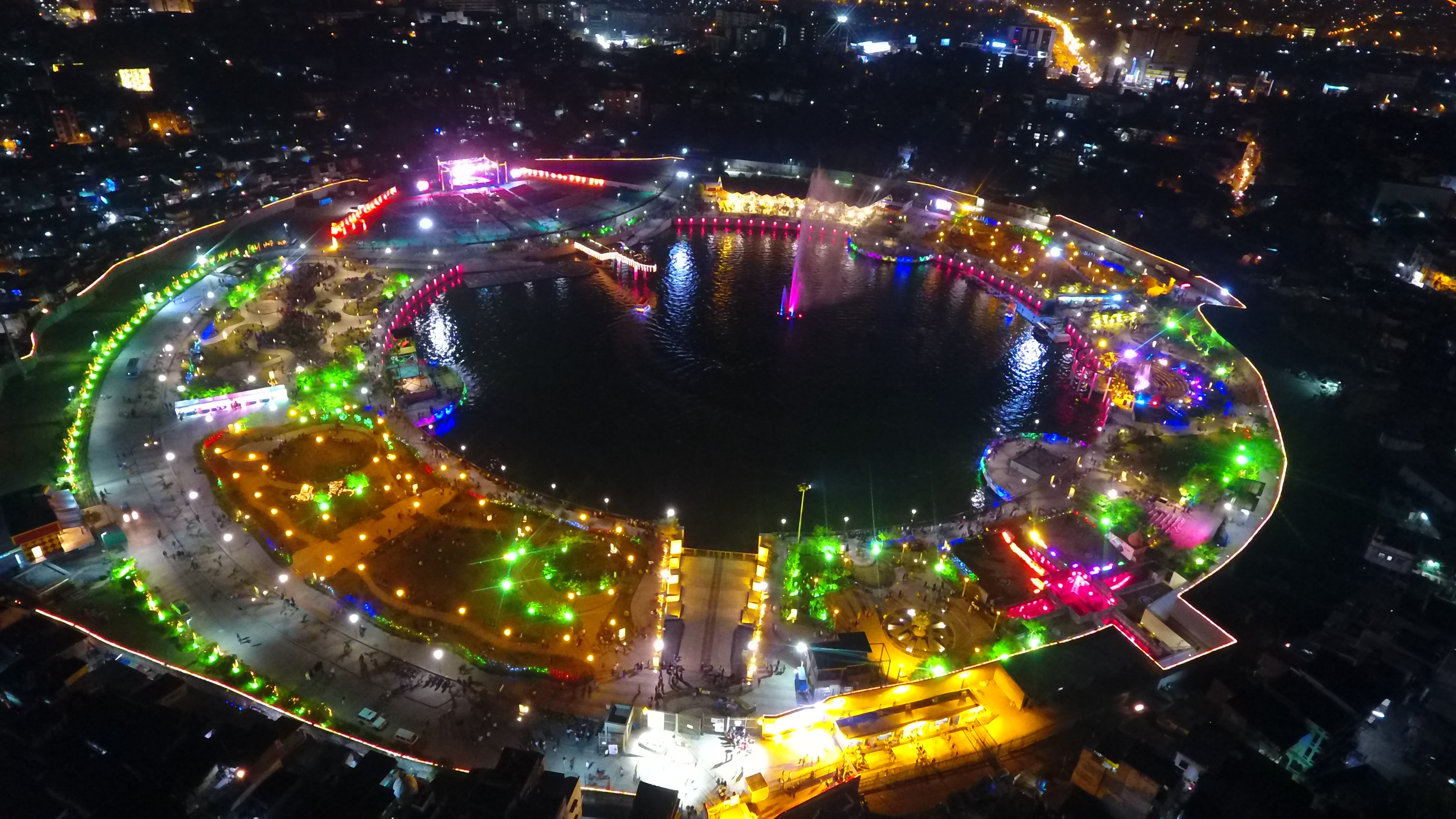
Drone view after renovation in 2016. (Night Mode)

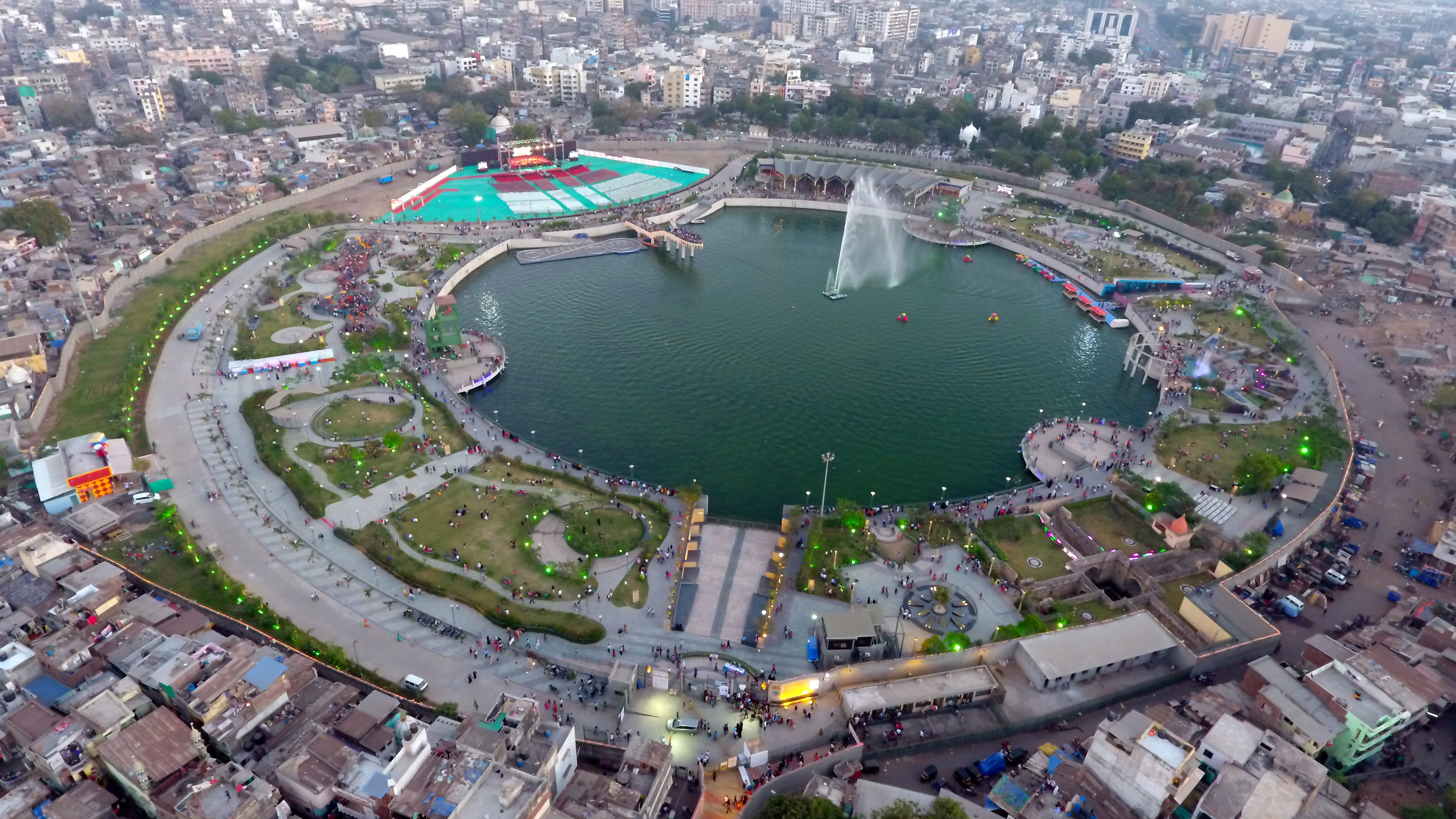
Drone view after renovation in 2016. (Day Mode)

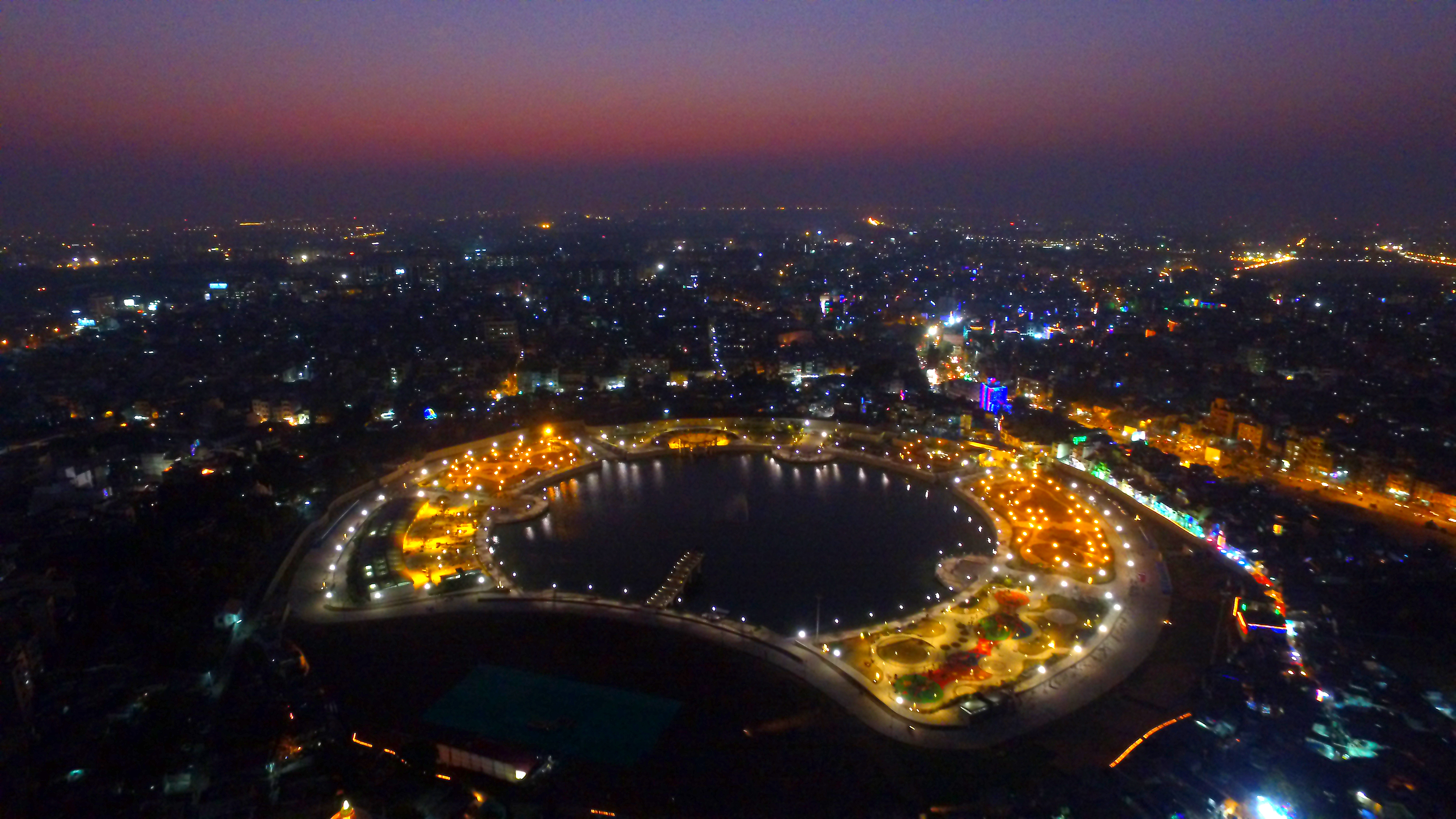
Drona view of Surat from the back side of Gopi Talav(Lake) in 2016.

== See also ==
- List of tourist attractions in Surat
- Tapi Riverfront
- Suvali Beach
- Dumas Beach

== Notes ==
- ^{^[Note 1]}Caste of Malik Gopi is unclear and has been described as Nagar Brahmin or Anaavla Brahmin.
- ^{^[Note 2]}The king at the time has been disputed and has been described to be Mahmud Begada or his son, Muzaffar Shah II in various accounts.
