= Sarthana Nature Park =

- Date opened: 1984
- Location: Surat, Gujarat, India
- Land area: 81 acres

Sarthana Nature Park is a zoological garden located in Surat, Gujarat, India, owned and managed by Surat Municipal Corporation.

This is the largest zoological garden of the state and one of the oldest zoological parks of Gujarat, spread over the 81 acres with river Tapi on the north side and Surat Kamrej road is on its south side.

The zoo was established in 1984, the first zoo in South Gujarat region and Gujarat's breeding center. The zoo has successfully bred lions, royal Bengal tigers, Himalayan bears and white peafowl.

== See also ==
- List of tourist attractions in Surat
