= Cable Bridge (Surat, India) =

Cable Bridge Surat
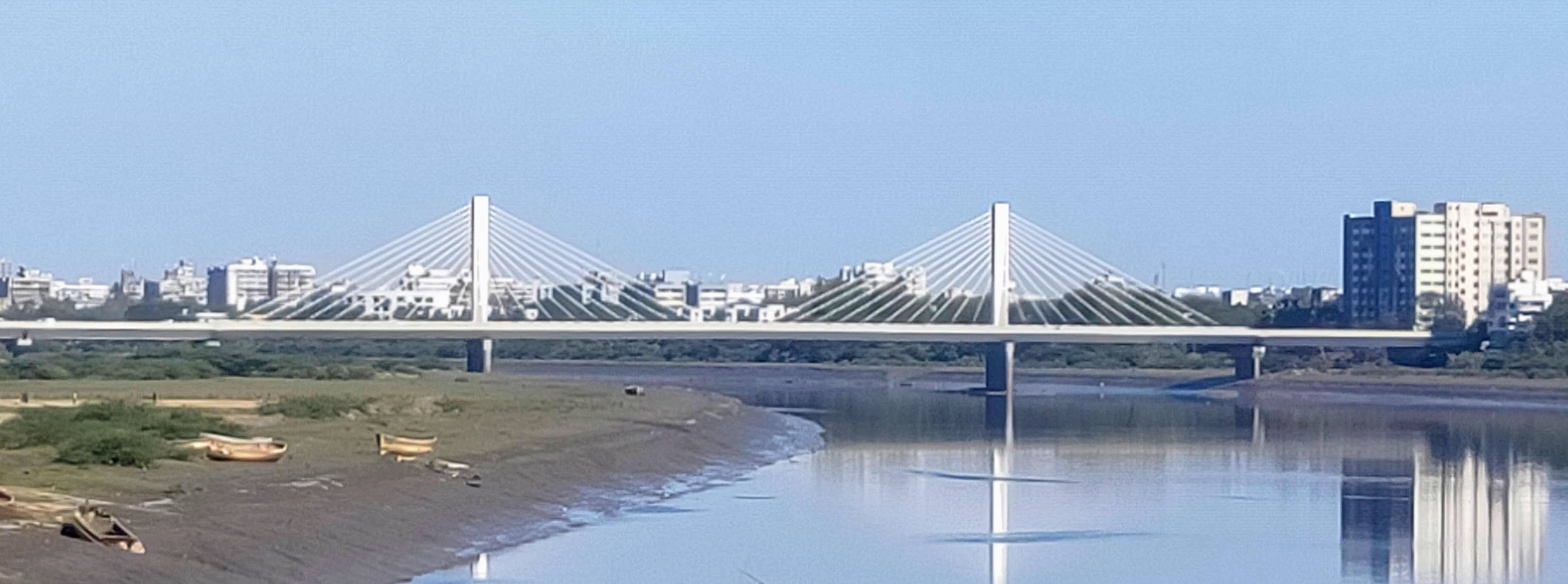
- Coordinates: 21°10′55.7″N 72°47′45.2″E
- Crosses: Tapti
- Locale: Athwa - Adajan, Surat, Gujarat, India
- Begins: 2 October 2018
- Official name: Pandit Dindayal Upadhyay Bridge
- Owner: Surat Municipal Corporation

Characteristics
- Design: High Level Cable-stayed bridge
- Material: Sub Structure - R.C.C. Pier
- Trough construction: Super Structure - Segmental Multi cell Box Girder/ PSC Box Girder / Solid Slab type
- Total length: 918 metres (3,012 ft)
- Width: 23.5 metres (77 ft)
- Longest span: 150 metres (490 ft)
- No. of spans: 15
- Piers in water: 7
- Clearance below: 23.5 metres (77 ft) (From high flow level)
- No. of lanes: 4

History
- Contracted lead designer: Before Incident - S. N. Bhobe and Associates; After incident - L & T Infra Engineering
- Constructed by: Sarted - Gammon India, Balance Portion - Unique Construction Surat
- Construction start: 2010
- Construction end: 2018
- Construction cost: Rs. 143.65 Crore
- Inaugurated: 2 October 2018

Location
- Interactive map of Cable Bridge Surat

3-way Interchange Flyover Bridge Connected with Cable-Stayed Bridge
- Coordinates: 21°10′56″N 72°47′45″E
- Locale: Athwa - Parle Point, Surat, Gujarat, India
- Begins: 2 October 2018
- Owner: Surat Municipal Corporation

Characteristics
- Total length: 669 metres + 445 metres = Total 1,114 metres (3,655 ft)
- No. of spans: 68

History
- Contracted lead designer: Before Incident - S. N. Bhobe and Associates; After incident - Casad Consultant, Ahmedabad
- Constructed by: Rachana Construction
- Construction start: 2013
- Construction end: 2018
- Construction cost: 30.92 Crore
- Inaugurated: 2 October 2018

Location
- Interactive map of 3-way Interchange Flyover Bridge Connected with Cable-Stayed Bridge

Cable Bridge, Surat or Pandit Dindayal Upadhyay Bridge is a cable-stayed bridge over the Tapti River that connects the Athwa and Adajan areas of Surat, Gujarat, India. The bridge is named after Indian politician and thinker Deendayal Upadhyaya. A connected 3-way interchange flyover bridge was constructed on the Athwalines side to facilitate easy flow of the traffic.

== Background ==
The construction of a new bridge over the Tapti River at Athwa was proposed in 2006. S. N. Bhobe and Associates, Navi Mumbai, was selected as the designer for both of the bridges in 2008. S. N. Bhobe and Associates has been designing projects for the Surat Municipal Corporation (SMC) since 2006. The same company previously designed the Fly Over Bridge at Nana Varachha junction, Fly Over Bridge at Kapodra Fire Station junction, Hajira - Adajan Flyover bridge and Shri Swami Dayanand Saraswati bridge across the Tapti River for SMC.

Construction work for the cable-stayed bridge started in 2010. The construction this portion of the bridge (River-Bridge) was contracted to Gammon India and the connected 3-way interchange flyover bridge on the Athwa side of the main river bridge was contracted to Rachana Construction. Spectrum Techno Consultant Private Limited was appointed as Project Manager Consultant to supervise the entire construction work and to ensure that the construction was taking place as per standards.

== Incident ==
On 25 May 2014 concrete slab work was being carried out at the sharp turning portion of the 3-way interchange flyover bridge.

On 10 June 2014 workers started removing the staging plates (formwork) from the slab, whose concrete was poured 15 days earlier on 25 May. Around 8 a.m. the whole slab weighing 650 tonnes, and of 35 metres in length, collapsed from 40 feet high.

16 workers were buried under the slab, 10 workers died on-the-spot and 6 sustained major or minor injuries.

=== Investigation ===
Gujarat Engineering Research Institution in Vadodara was appointed to investigate the site, debris and material used for construction. Based on their report, the material used for construction was judged poor quality.

The design documents were sent to Sardar Vallabhbhai National Institute of Technology, Surat for verification. Their report said there were major flaws in the design of the sharply curved part of the bridge. The sharp curvature was not taken into account by the designer, instead the design calculation was based on a straight slab, actually the detailed analysis should have been performed for that curved section. The center of gravity of that slab was outside the bridge deck and that created a larger 'turning moment', making the slab unstable.

=== Aftermath ===
Based on investigations, the Police Inspector of Umra Police Station lodged a first information report on 3 July 2014 against 18 accused under section 304 Part II, 337, 338 and 114 of the Indian Penal Code. This included three employees of 'S. N. Bhobe and Associates, Navi Mumbai', five engineers from 'Spectrum Techno Consultant Private Limited,' four directors and three others of 'Rachana Constructions', and three engineers from 'SMC Bridge Cell.'

SMC Blacklisted 'S. N. Bhobe and Associates, Navi Mumbai' and transferred the design contract to 'L & T Infrastructure Eng. Ltd'.

'Rachana Construction' was also blacklisted.

Subsequently Gammon India was also blacklisted due to them abandoning the incomplete work in November 2014. The remaining bridge construction contract of the Bridge was issued to 'Unique Construction, Surat'.

The initial plan was to complete the construction in 30 months, but the collapse of one portion of the 3-Way Interchange Flyover Bridge during construction delayed the project.

The bridge was inaugurated by the Chief Minister of Gujarat, Vijay Rupani, on 2 October 2018, 8 years after starting the construction.

== See also ==
- 2018 Kolkata bridge collapse
- 2016 Kolkata flyover collapse
- 2010 Commonwealth Games footbridge collapse in Delhi
