= Kavi Narmad Central Library =

Library in Gujarat, India

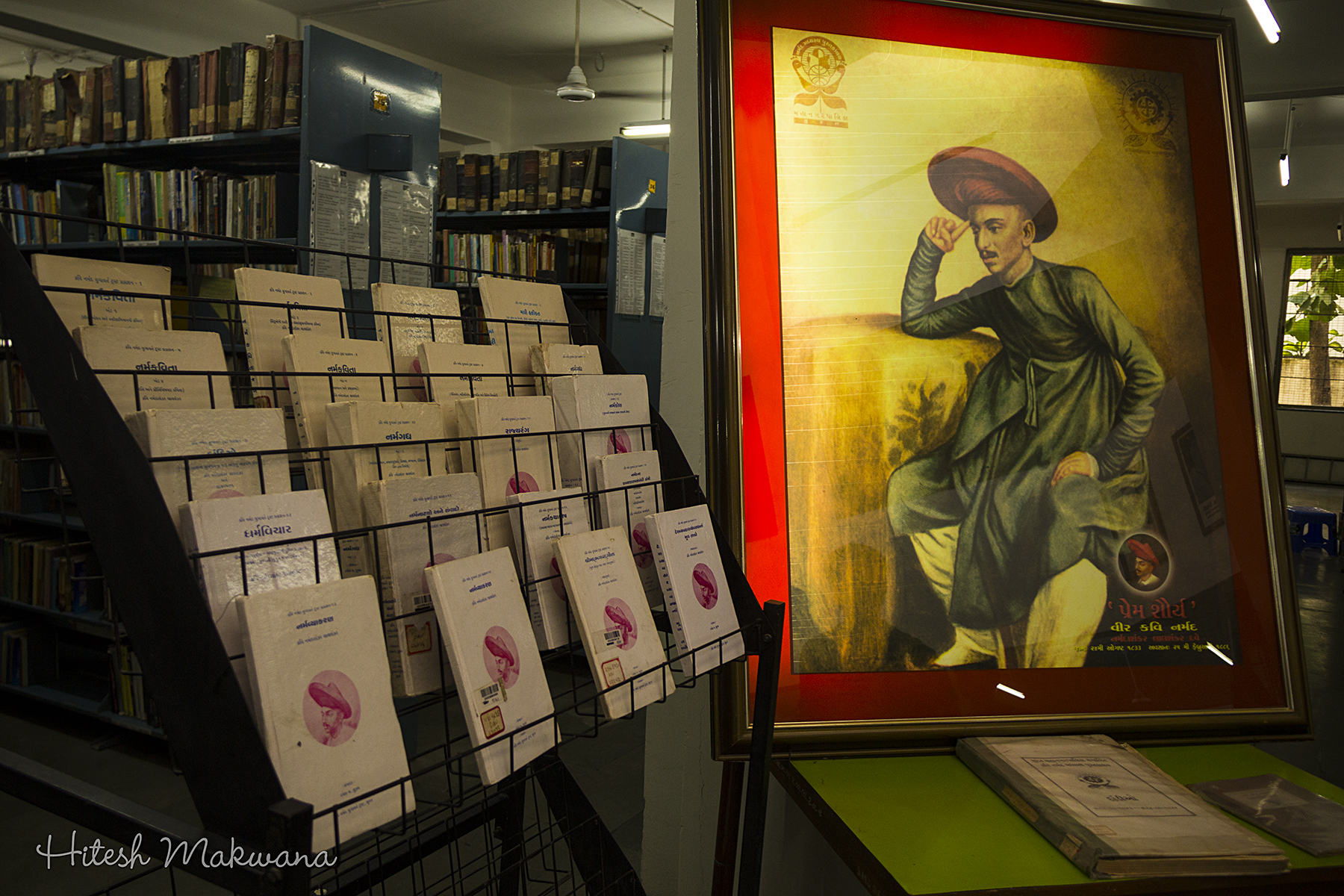
- Kavi Narmad Central Library, 2013
- Location: Surat
- Established: 24 August 1991

Collection
- Size: 2,87,250 books in the Central Book Store; 42,312 books in Children's Section; 28,377 in Reference Section; 1,969 books in electronic form 175 periodicals 55 newspapers 2600 books in Braille

Access and use
- Population served: 36,230 members of Central Library, 10,625 members of Children's Section and members of the public

Other information
- Budget: ₹ 2.04 crore

Kavi Narmad Central Library is a public library in Surat

== History ==
It was built by the Surat Municipal Corporation in 1991 at Ghod Dod Road. The library is the largest in the city with 2,26,391 books and a membership of 46,855. The library premises have a total area of, 6158 sq. m. and was built at the cost of ₹4.03 crore. The library also houses a reading room and a newspaper section open to the public. It is named after Veer Narmad the famous Gujarati poet from Surat, and was opened to the public on his 158th birth anniversary.

On 18 January 2011, Information Centre, separate sections for senior citizen and rare book collection, conference hall and audiovisual room were added. More recently, the revitalization of the library was completed.

== See also ==
- List of tourist attractions in Surat
- Science Centre, Surat
