= Shyama Prasad Mukherjee (physician) =

Indian doctor

- Born: Shyama Prasad Mukherjee
- Education: Patna Medical College
- Known for: Doctor
- Awards: Padma Shri (2019)

Shyama Prasad Mukherjee is an Indian doctor. In 2019, he has been awarded Padma Shri by the Indian Government for his contribution in medicine.

== Early life ==
Mukherjee did his MBBS from Patna Medical College in 1957. He started practising in Ranchi in 1966.

== Career ==
Mukherjee was the former head of the Department of Pathology at Rajendra Medical College. He has been treating patients over 55 years. He takes only 5 rupees to treat poor people.

== Awards ==
- Padma Shri
