= Anglican Church, Surat =

Church in Surat, India

Architecture
- Established: 1824

Anglican Church also known as CNI Christ Church, is the oldest church of Surat. The Anglican Church was constructed in 1824 as per the western design popular in the 19th century. The construction of this church building was started in 1820 under the blessings of Mountstuart Elphinstone. The main attractions of this church are its 10 feet long Cross and 300 year old bible. It now belongs to the Church of North India.

== See also ==
- List of tourist attractions in Surat
