= Andrews Library =

Library in Surat, India

- Location: Surat, Gujarat
- Established: 1 July 1850

Collection
- Size: 18,000

Other information
- Director: Surat Nanpura Parsi Anjuman Trust

Andrews Library is the oldest library in Surat, Gujarat, India, established in 1850.

== History ==
It was established in 1850. The library was named after Andrews, a retired magistrate, and co-established by Rao Bahadur Naginchand Jhaveri, a wealthy pearl dealer who often contributed to the development of the city.

== Collections ==
The library holds some rare works in arts and history, this literary realm also caters to students from the science, commerce, engineering and medical fields, and provides newspapers and magazines in many languages for the locals. In 2006, floods had destroyed about 25,000 of the libraries' book collection.

== See also ==
- List of tourist attractions in Surat
