= Mughal Sarai, Surat =

Mughal Sarai
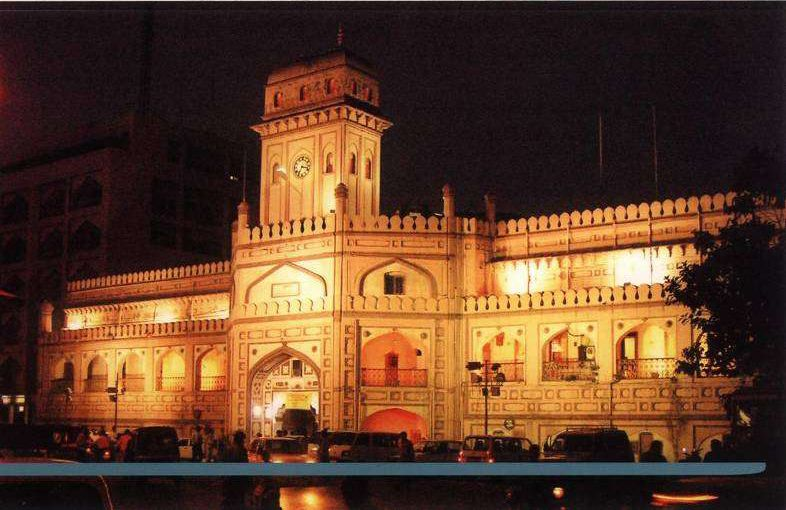

General information
- Type: caravanserai
- Architectural style: Mughal architecture
- Location: Surat, Gujarat, India
- Inaugurated: 1644 CE

The Mughal Sarai is a caravanserai located in Surat, Gujarat, India.

== History ==
The sarai was built in 1644 CE.

It was briefly used to detain political prisoners during the Indian Rebellion of 1857.

== Architecture ==
The building reflects Mughal architecture, except for the clock tower, which was added by the British.

=== Inscriptions ===
Inscriptions found in the sarai are now kept in the Chhatrapati Shivaji Maharaj Vastu Sangrahalaya.
