= List of tourist attractions in Surat =

Surat is a city of the western Indian state of Gujarat, the eighth largest city and ninth largest urban agglomeration in India. Surat is the 2nd cleanest city of India and world's fastest growing city. Surat is also famous for its food, besides being the hub of diamonds and textiles in India, and one of the country's oldest cities.

Tourist attractions of Surat include:

== Historical monuments ==
- Heritage Square
- British Cemetery of Surat
- Dutch Cemetery, Surat

== Forts ==
- Surat Castle

== Museums ==
- Saraswati Mandir – a house museum of Gujarati poet Narmad

== Beaches, dams and lakes ==
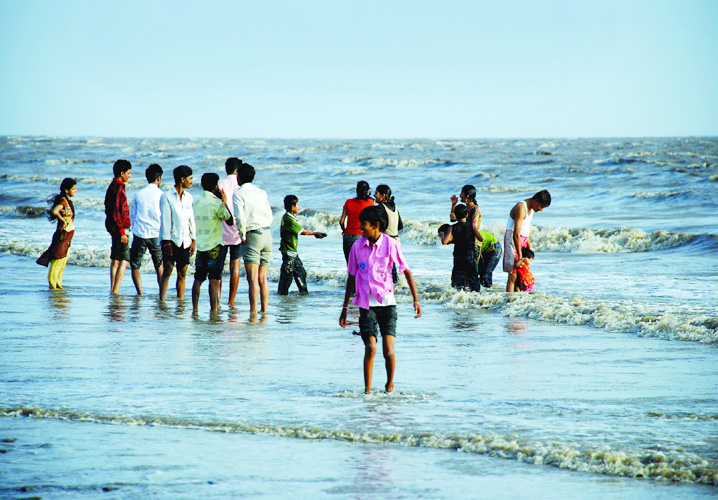
Dumas Beach

- Suvali Beach
- Dumas Beach
- Umbharat Beach
- Ukai Dam
- Gopi Talav

== Amusements, parks and zoos ==
- Sarthana Nature Park
- Jagdishchandra Bose Aquarium
- Science Centre
- Amaazia

== Libraries ==
- Andrews Library
- Nanpura Parsi Library
- Kavi Narmad Central Library

== Malls and markets ==
- Chauta Bazaar

== Places of worship ==
=== Temples ===
- Chintamani Jain Temple
- Shree Shyam Mandir, Surat Dham ambaji Mandir

=== Churches ===
- Anglican Church

== Other points of interest ==
- Bedkuvadoor
- Bhadbhuja
- Bhagal
- Bhavanivad
- Gaurav Path
- Tapi Riverfront
- Wier-cum causeway
