= Dutch Cemetery =

Dutch Cemetery may refer to:

- Dutch Cemetery, Madagascan bay where Cornelis de Houtman once landed
- Dutch Cemetery, Chinsurah, West Bengal, India
- Dutch Cemetery, Elmina
- Dutch Cemetery, Kollam, former name of Portuguese Cemetery, Kollam
- Dutch Cemetery, Murshidabad, West Bengal, India
- Dutch Cemetery, Surat, Surat
- Kochi Dutch Cemetery, Kochi
- Dutch Cemetery, Pulicat, Pulicat
- Dutch Tombs, Ahmedabad, Gujarat, India
