= Dutch Tombs, Ahmedabad =

Historic Dutch cemetery in Surat, Gujarat

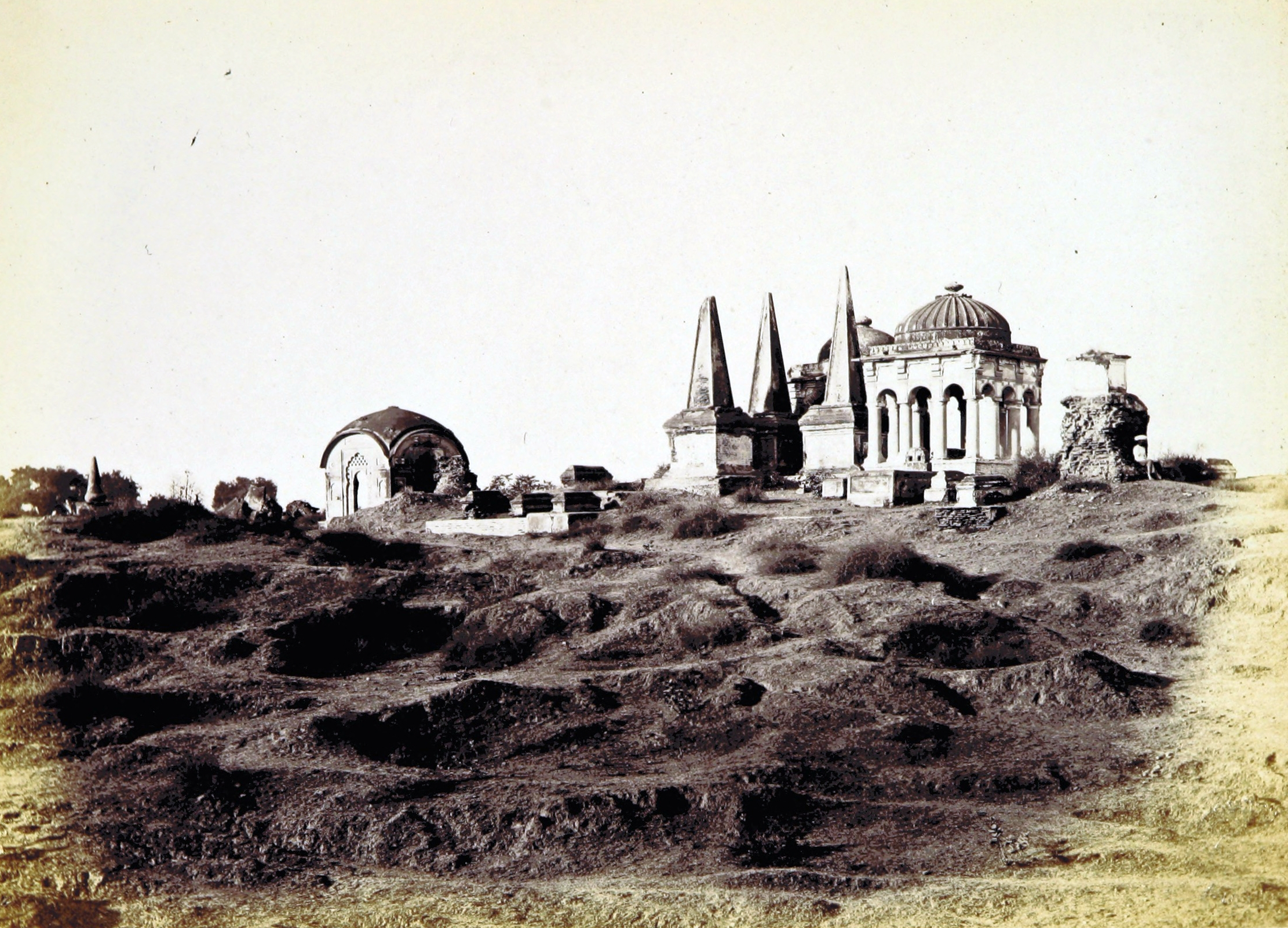
- Dutch Tombs near Kankaria lake, 1866
- Interactive map of Dutch Tombs, Ahmedabad

Details
- Established: 17th century
- Location: Near Kankaria Lake, Ahmedabad, Gujarat
- Country: India
- Coordinates: 23.0058°N 72.5975°E
- Type: Colonial christian cemetery

The Dutch Tombs, Ahmedabad is a seventeenth-century burial ground associated with the Dutch East India Company (VOC) settlement at Ahmedabad, Gujarat, India. There are 38 tombs.

== History ==
The Dutch, British and Armenians worked with the Dutch East India Company whose headquarter was in Surat (Dutch Suratte). It had a factory in Ahmedabad from 1617 to 1744.

The Dutch, Armenian and British tombs are located on One Tree Hill embankment of Kankaria Lake. They are Saracenic in style with domes and pillars which displays mixture of Indian, Mughal and European architectural elements. The dates of the tombs are deciphered which range from 1641 to 1699. The Armenian tombs perhaps belonged to brokers in the Dutch factory at Ahmedabad.

There are 38 tombs in total. Ten of them were damaged during the 2001 Gujarat earthquake. There are three tombs with domed cupolas and pillars featuring Indo-Islamic or Mughal architecture fused with European architecture while the few tombs are pyramidal.

== Protection and conservation ==
The site is listed as the State Protected Monument (S-GJ-2) by the Government of Gujarat under the Gujarat Ancient Monuments and Archeological Sites and Remains Act, 1965.

== Gallery ==
Tomb with Mughal style mausoleum

Tombs with domed cupola and pillars. Pyramidal tombs in back.

Tombs

Pyramidal and domed tombs

Tombs

Tomb, damaged

== See also ==
- Dutch Cemetery, Surat
- British Cemetery of Surat
- Dutch Cemetery, Pulicat
- Dutch Cemetery, Murshidabad
- Dutch Cemetery, Fort Kochi
- Dutch Suratte
