= Bastion Bunglow =

- Location: Kochi, Kerala, India

History
- Built: 1667 AD

Site notes
- Architectural style: Indo-European style

Bastion Bunglow is a famous tourist site in the city of Kochi, located near Vasco da Gama square in Fort Kochi, India. Currently, it is the official residence of the Sub-Collector. Bastion Bunglow is an example of Indo-European-style architecture mainly following the Dutch style. Bastion Bungalow is a sea-facing Dutch heritage structure built in 1667. Bastian Bungalow had been used as a residential building during the British period. Colonel Macaulay, the resident of Cochin during the early decade of the 19th century stayed in this building.

== Etymology ==
The name Bastion Bunglow is derived from its location on the site of the Stromberg Bastion of the old Dutch fort.

== See also ==
- Vasco House, Kochi
- Thakur House, Kochi
