= List of mayors of Surat =

Mayor of Surat
- Incumbent; Daxesh Mavani since 12 September 2023
- Term length: Two and half years
- Formation: 1949

The Mayor of Surat is the first citizen of the Indian city of Surat and is the head of the Surat Municipal Corporation. He is also the presiding authority of the General Board of the SMC. The Mayor is elected from among the elected councilors in its first meeting after elections. The position is currently held by Daxesh Mavani of the BJP.

== Election ==
The General Body of the SMC is formed by the elected members from each ward. There are 38 wards under the jurisdiction of SMC, which elect a total of 114 councilors. The first meeting of the General Body and the Standing Committee is called by the Municipal Commissioner of Surat. During the first meeting, the councilors elect the Mayor and the Deputy Mayor from amongst themselves. The tenure of Mayor is two and half years and that of his deputy is one year.

== History ==
The post was created after the Surat Municipal Corporation came into being under the Bombay Provincial Municipal Act, 1949.

== Past mayors ==
Surat has witnessed following persons as Mayors.

Colour key
(for political parties)
BJP
INC
Other

Name	Entered office	Left office	Political party
G. R. Chokhawala	1 October 1966	5 March 1967	INC
Captain M. A. Golandaz	12 April 1967	8 July 1969	INC
Vaikunthbhai B. Mistry	9 July 1969	19 January 1971	INC
Abdulkadir Musamir	1 February 1971	10 September 1971	INC
Vaikunthbhai B. Shashtri	11 September 1971	7 July 1972	INC
Nanalal M. Gajjar	8 July 1972	20 January 1973	INC
Ramanlal B. Jariwala	6 February 1973	19 February 1974	INC
Navinchandra K. Bhartiya	10 December 1975	9 December 1976	INC
Madanlal P. Bunki	11 February 1981	19 September 1981	INC
Chimanlal V. Patel	30 October 1981	10 February 1982	INC
Nagindas N. Bardoliwala	11 February 1982	29 January 1983	INC
Swarupchand S. Jariwala	10 February 1983	20 June 1983	
Kashiram Rana	30 July 1983	20 September 1983	BJP
Nagindas N. Bardoliwala	2 November 1983	7 February 1984	INC
Kashiram Rana	7 February 1984	3 December 1984	BJP
Nagindas N. Bardoliwala	11 April 1985	10 February 1987	INC
Dr. George D. Solanky	11 February 1987	30 January 1988	INC
Kashiram Rana	9 February 1988	29 June 1988	BJP
Kadir Pirzada	5 August 1988	8 February 1989	INC
Pratapsingh B. Kantharia	8 February 1989	8 February 1990	INC
Ajitbhai H. Desai	8 February 1990	31 October 1993	BJP
Fakirbhai C. Chauhan	1 July 1995	1 July 1996	BJP
Gitaben B. Desai	1 July 1996	30 July 1997	BJP
Navnitlal S. Jariwala	30 July 1997	28 July 1998	BJP
Savitaben V. Sharada	28 July 1998	7 July 1999	BJP
Bhikhabhai R. Patel	7 July 1999	30 June 2000	BJP
Ajaykumar J. Choksi	16 October 2000	28 April 2003	BJP
Snehlataben F. Chauhan	28 April 2003	15 December 2005	BJP
Dr. Kanubhai Mavani	26 December 2005	19 June 2008	BJP
Ranjit M. Gilitwala	19 June 2008	15 December 2010	BJP
Rajendra Desai	15 December 2010	15 June 2013	BJP
Niranjanbhai Zanzmera	15 June 2013	14 December 2015	BJP
Asmita Shiroya	14 December 2015	20 June 2018	BJP
Dr. Jagdish Patel	20 June 2018	13 March 2021	BJP
Hemali Boghawala	13 March 2021	12 September 2023	BJP
Daxesh Mavani	12 September 2023	Incumbent	BJP
Mayaben Mavani	28 May 2026		BJP
