= List of tourist attractions in Kochi =

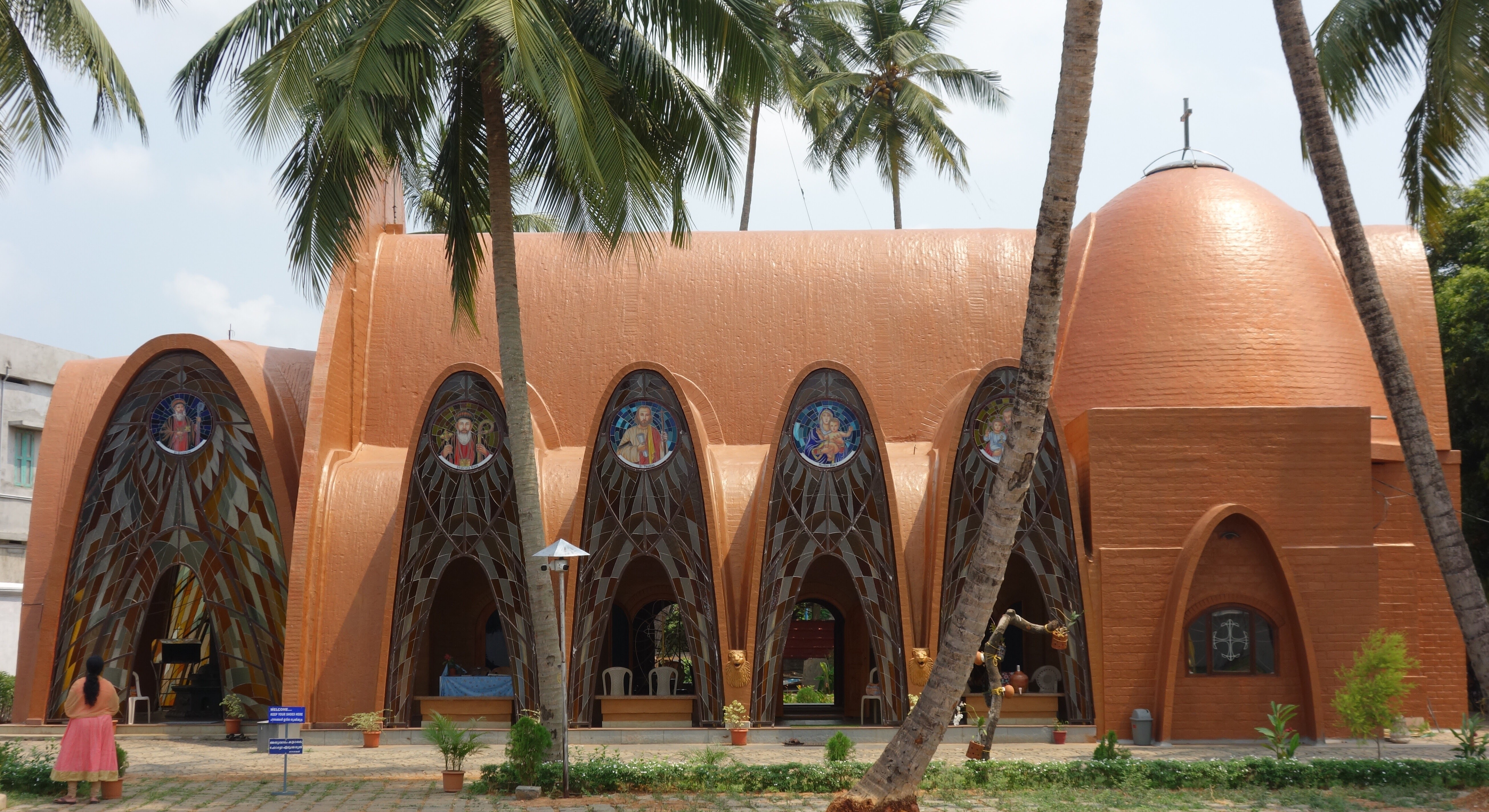
St.George Orthodox Koonan Kurish Old Syrian Church - Koonan Kurish Sathyam took place at this Church in AD 1653 is the first attempt to resist colonialism and western invasion in India.

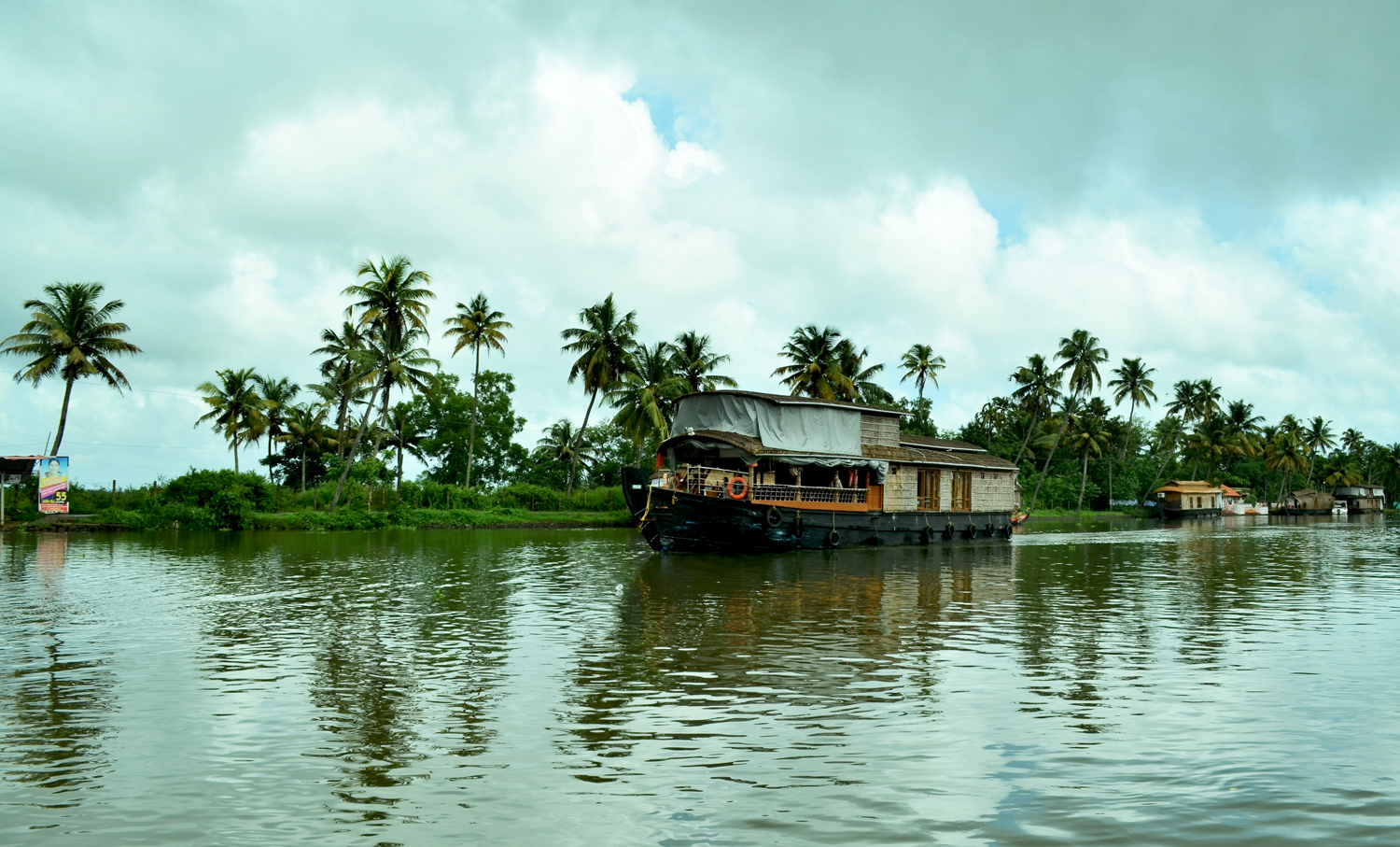
A traditional kettuvallam idling in the lake

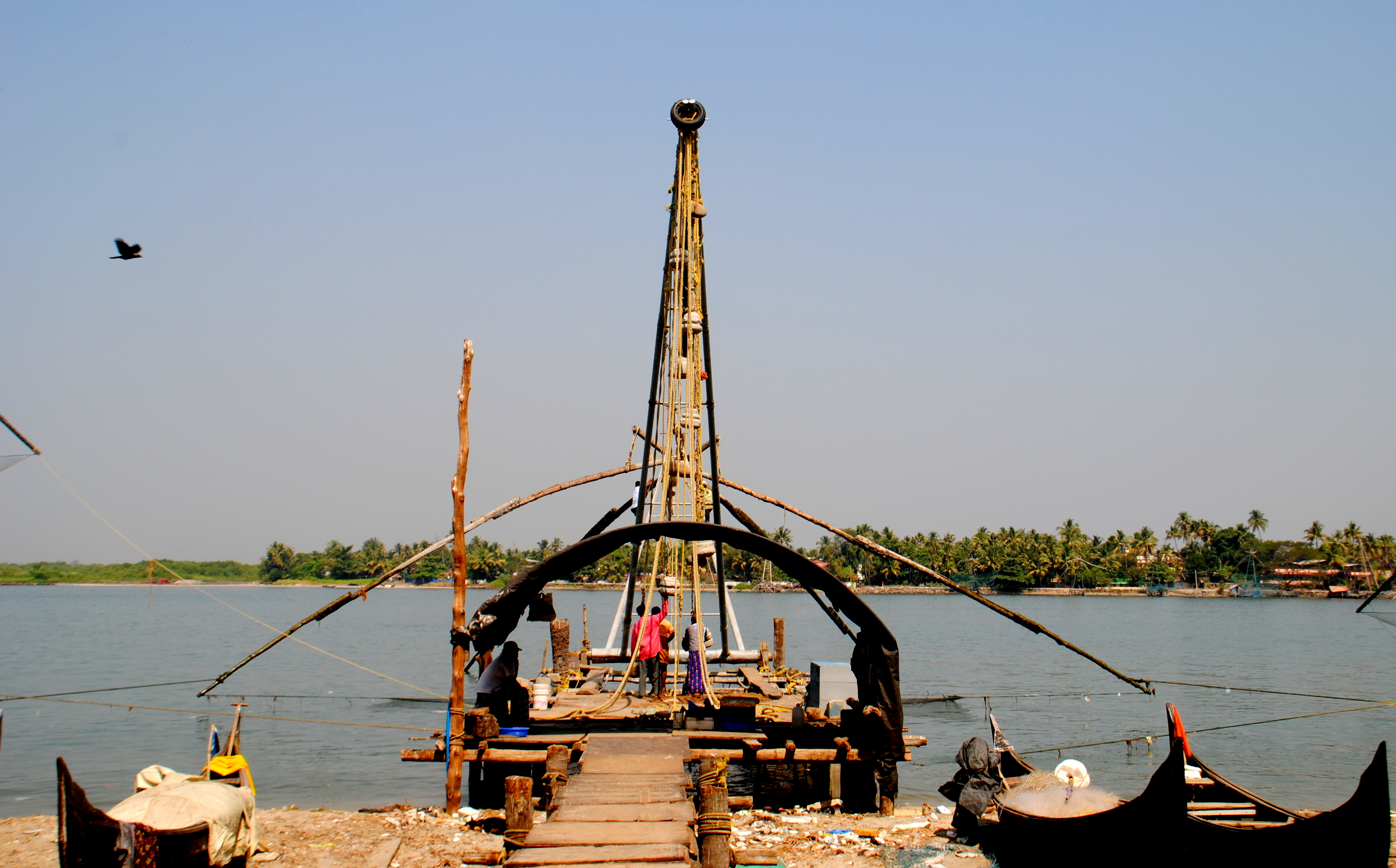
A common scene from Fort Kochi

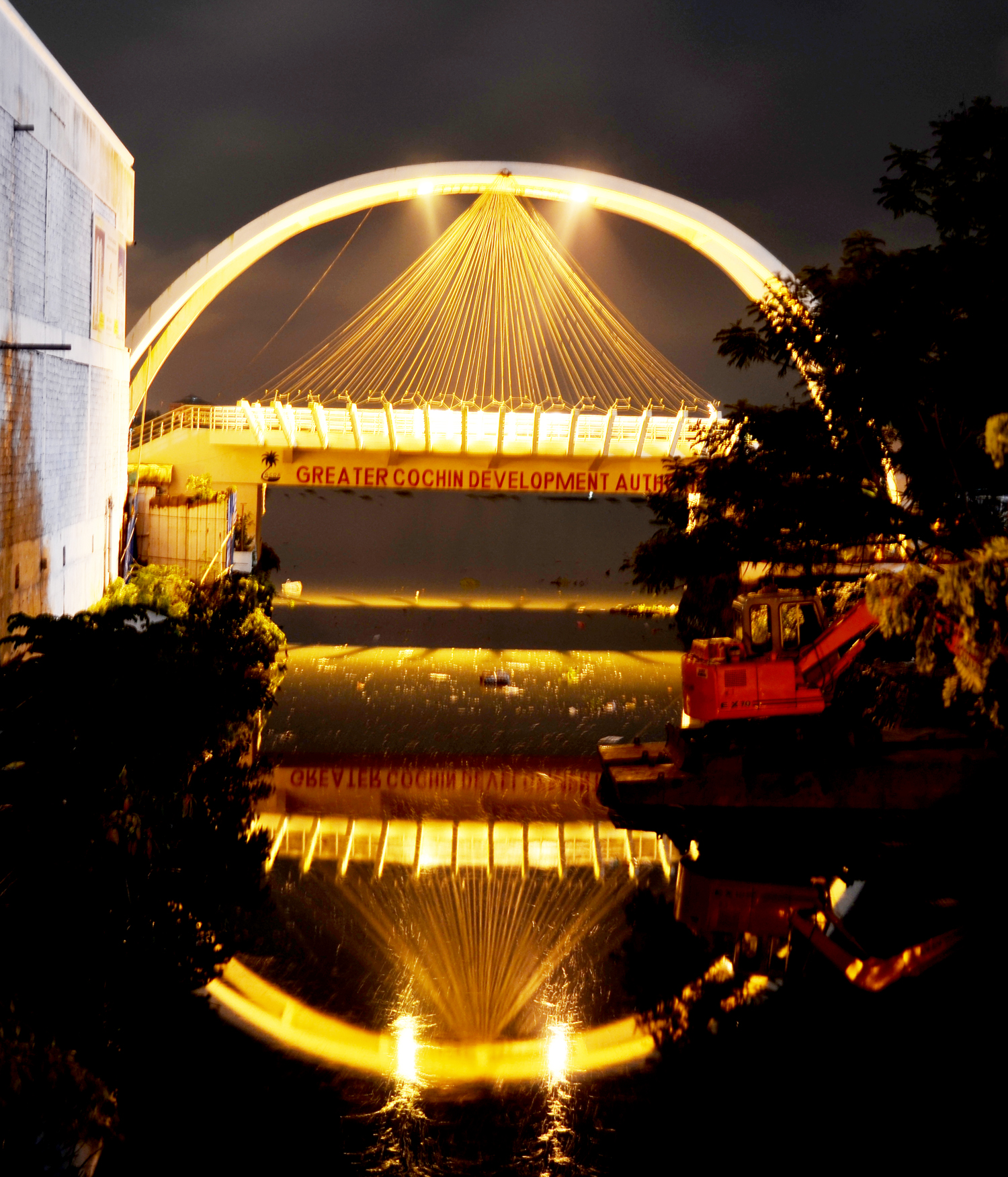
Rainbow Bridge beauty

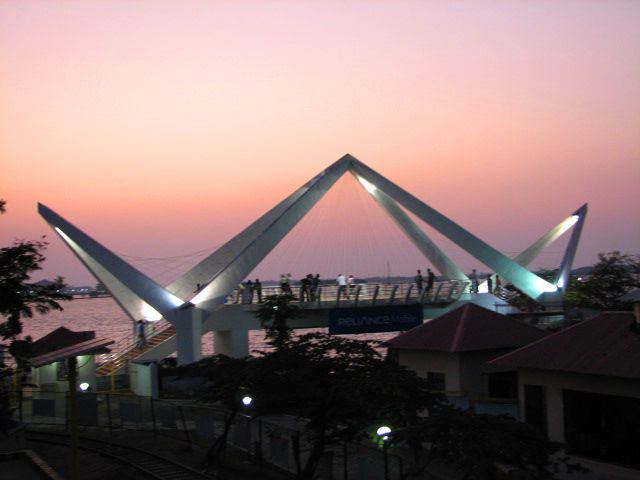
The Chinese Fishing Net bridge in Kochi

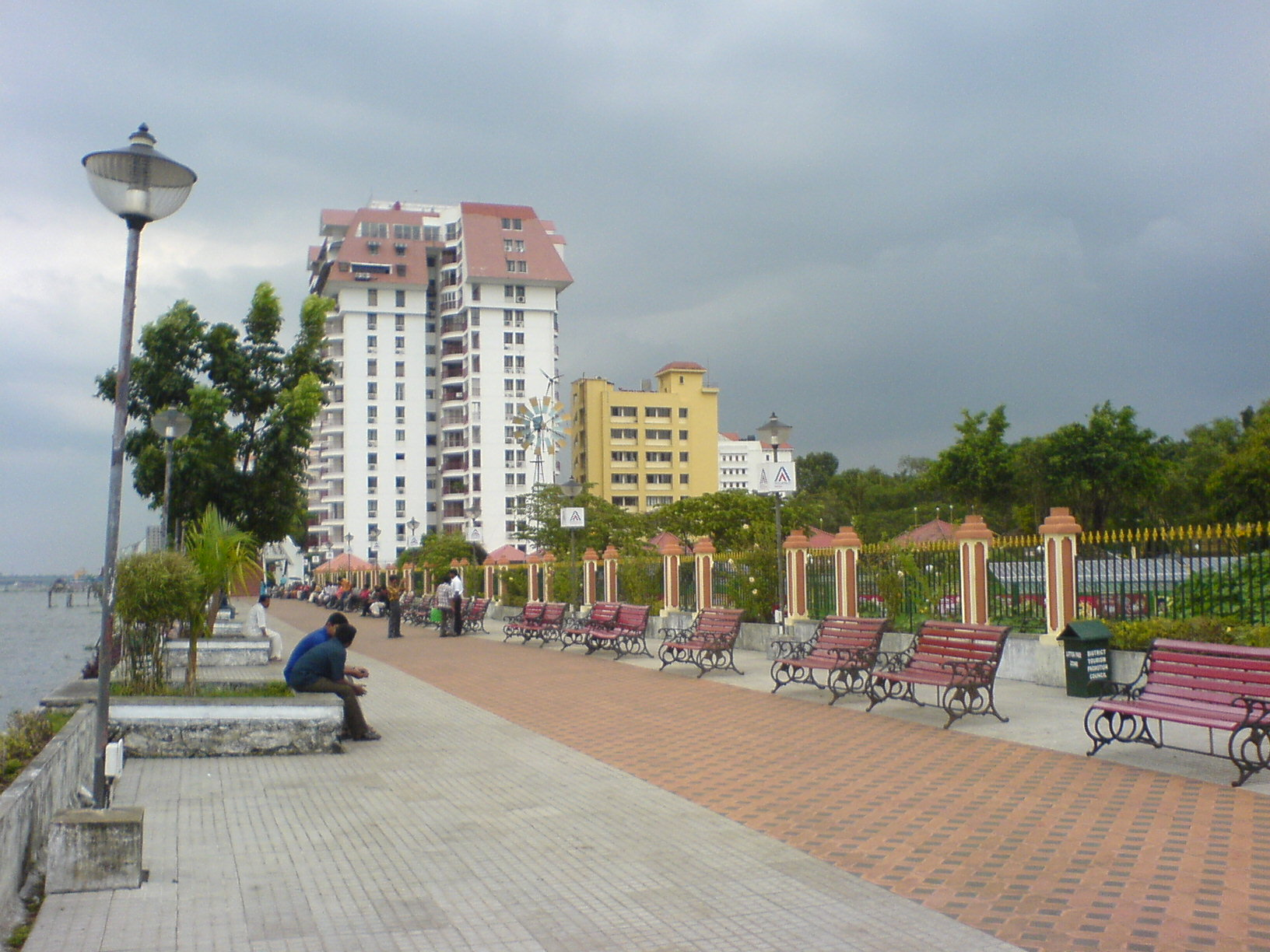
Pedestrians can stroll along the Marine Drive, a waterfront promenade of Kochi

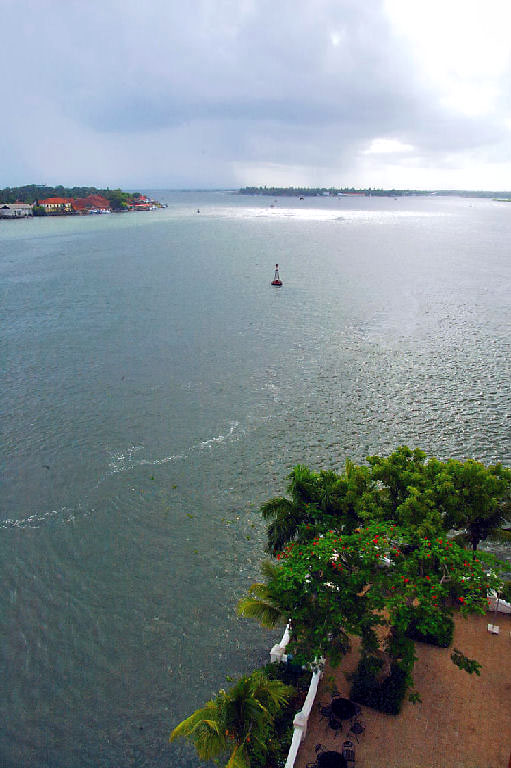
A view of the Kochi harbour mouth from Willingdon Island

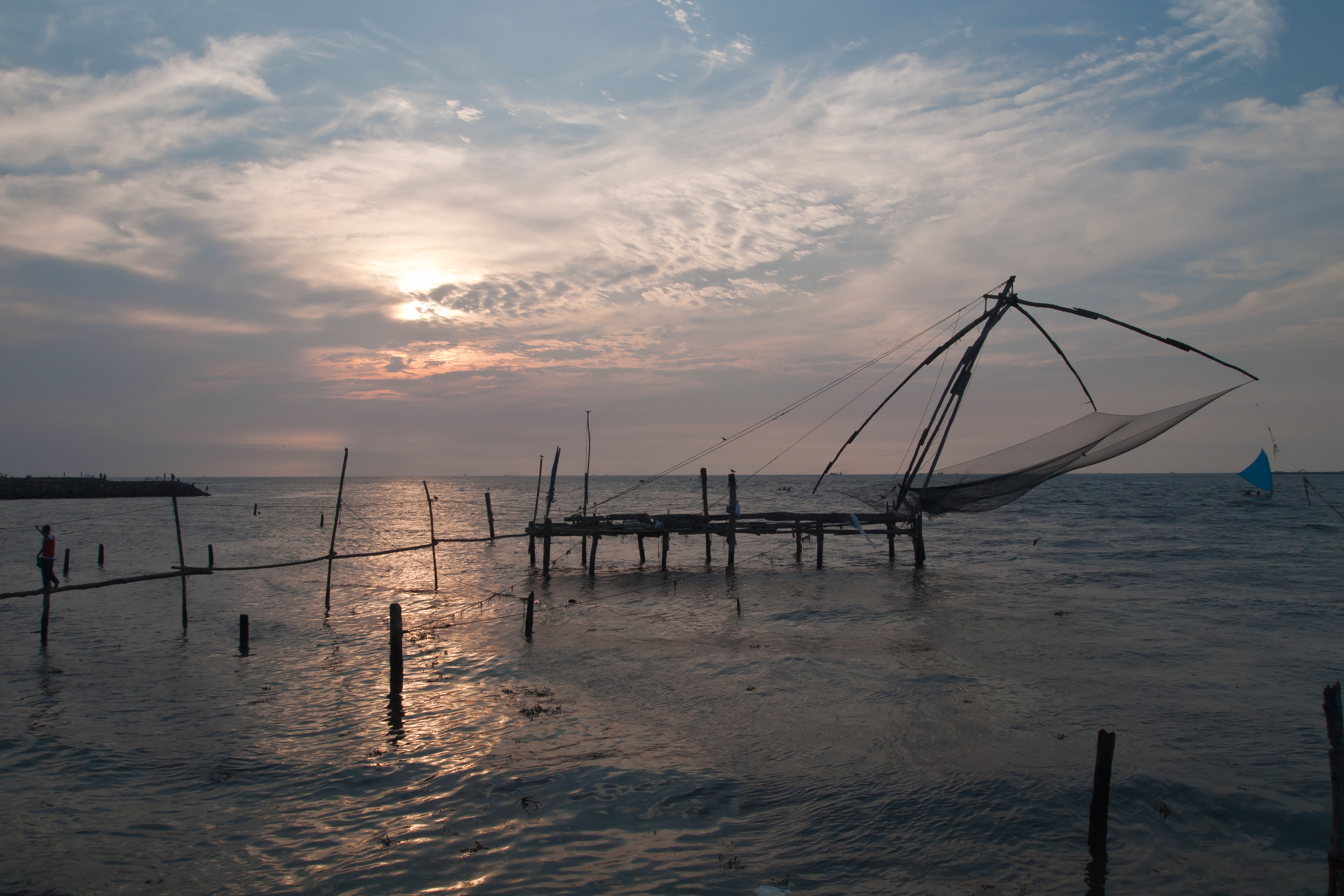
Cheena vala (Chinese fishing nets)

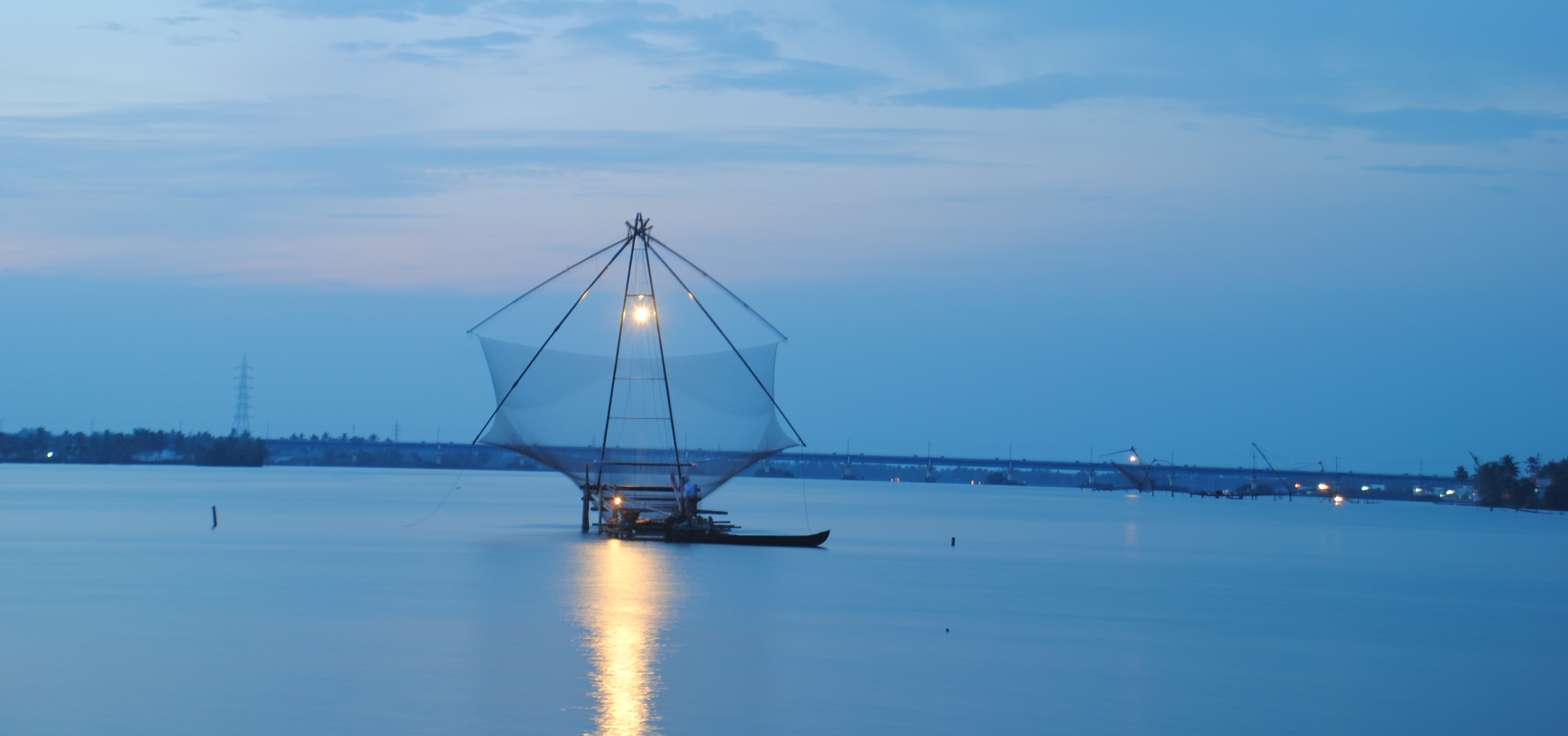
Marine Drive

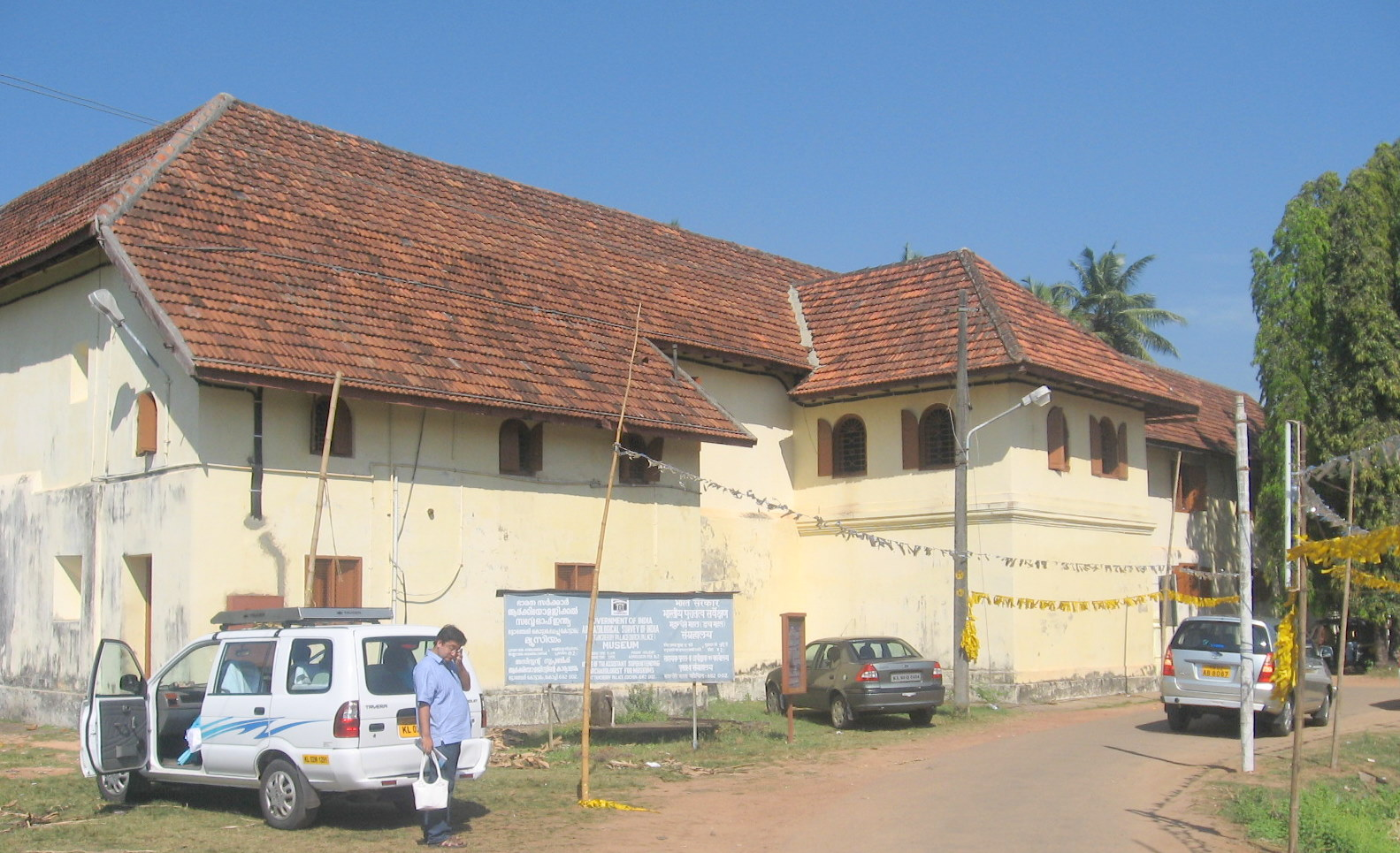
Mattancherry Palace, front side

Kochi (Malayalam: കൊച്ചി [kotˈt͡ʃi]), formerly known as Cochin, is a city in the Indian state of Kerala. It is a popular tourist destination for both domestic and international visitors travelling to Kerala and is amongst the most visited tourist destinations in India.

As per Kerala's Tourism Department data, more than 23 million domestic tourists visited the city in 2017. According to the department, aspects like MICE tourism, LuLu Mall, the Wonderla water theme park, and the metro nature of Kochi city were the main aspects for attracting more domestic tourists.

The city is popularly known as the Queen of Arabian Sea as it has the natural harbor on the Arabian Sea coast and was the centre of the world spice trade for many centuries. Old Kochi (presently called West Kochi), loosely refers to a group of islands which comprise Willingdon Island, Fort Kochi, Mattancherry etc. The city derives its name from the Malayalam word Kochazhi meaning small lagoon.

== Attractions ==
- Backwaters of Kochi are a chain of brackish lagoons and lakes lying parallel to the Arabian Sea coast (known as the Malabar Coast) of Kerala state in southern India. In Cochin, the stretch from Kochi Azhi to Munambam Azhi, the backwaters are known as Veeranpuzha. The main attraction in the Kochi backwaters in the hidden set of islands called Kadamakudy or Kadamakkudy. These are a cluster of 14 Islands, each with a uniqueness. The best way to explore Kochi is on an E boat Island Hopping Cruise. You get the explore these islands on a guided E boat Cruise with Tropiq Getaways

It is the northern extension of Vembanad Lake. Vembanad Lake (Vembanad Kayal or Vembanad Kol) is India's longest lake, and is the largest lake in Kerala. It is also one of the largest lakes in India.

- Marine Drive is a picturesque promenade in Kochi. It is built facing the backwaters and is a popular hangout for the local populace. Marine Drive is also an economically thriving part of the city of Kochi. With several shopping malls, it is as an important centre of shopping activity in Kochi. The walkway has two contemporarily constructed bridges, the Rainbow Bridge and the Chinese Fishing Net Bridge. The view of the setting and rising sun over the sea mouth, and the gentle breeze from the Vembanad Lake has made Marine Drive an important tourist destination in Kochi. Hundreds of people, both natives and tourists, throng the walkway during the evenings.
- Fort Kochi, situated on the Fort Kochi/Mattancherry peninsula, is the historical part of the city and home to many tourist attractions, such as the cantilevered Chinese fishing nets, the Mattancherry Palace and the Santa Cruz Basilica. The famous Kochi-Muziris Biennale which is an international exhibition of contemporary art is held in and around here.
- Hill Palace is the largest archaeological museum in Kerala, near Thrippunithura. It was the administrative office of Kochi Rajas. Built in 1865, the palace complex consists of 49 buildings in the traditional architectural style, spreading across in 54 acres (220,000 m^{2}). The complex has an archaeological museum, a heritage museum, a deer park, a prehistoric park and a children's park.
- Mattancherry Palace, also known as the Dutch Palace, in Mattancherry, Kochi, features Kerala murals depicting Hindu temple art, portraits and exhibits of the Rajas of Kochi. Mattancherry Palace is situated at Palace Road, Mattancherry, Kochi. It was built by the Portuguese and presented to Veera Kerala Varma (1537–65), Raja of Kochi, in 1555 AD.The palace is a quadrangular structure built in Nālukettu style, the traditional Kerala style of architecture, with a courtyard in the middle. In the courtyard there stands a small temple dedicated to Pazhayannur Bhagavati, the protective goddess of the Kochi royal family. There are two more temples on either side of the Palace, one dedicated to Lord Krishna and the other to Lord Shiva. Certain elements of architecture, as for example the nature of its arches and the proportion of its chambers are indicative of European influence in basic Nāluketttu style.
- Jawaharlal Nehru Stadium, locally known as Kaloor International Stadium, is an international stadium in Kochi, Kerala, India. With a capacity to hold 60,000 spectators, the stadium was built in 1996. Originally constructed as a football stadium, it has played host to a number of international cricket and football matches. The grounds of the stadium serve as venue for important exhibitions, cinema events and political rallies in the city. The stadium is equipped with floodlights for night play.
- Jewish Synagogue, or the Paradesi Synagogue, is the oldest synagogue in the Commonwealth of Nations, located in Kochi in South India. It was built in 1568 by the Malabar Yehudan people or Cochin Jewish community in the Kingdom of Cochin. It is also referred to as the Cochin Jewish Synagogue or the Mattancherry Synagogue. The synagogue is located in the quarter of Old Cochin known as Jew Town, and is the only one of the seven synagogues in the area still in use. The complex has four buildings. It was built adjacent to the Mattancherry Palace temple on the land given to the Malabari Yehuden community by the Raja of Kochi, RamaVarma. The Mattancherry Palace temple and the Mattancherry synagogue share a common wall.
- Santa Cruz Cathedral Basilica, a church built originally by the Portuguese and elevated to a Cathedral by Pope Paul IV in 1558, was spared by the Dutch conquerors who destroyed many Catholic buildings. Later, the British demolished the structure and Bishop Dom Gomez Vereira commissioned a new building in 1887. Consecrated in 1905, Santa Cruz was proclaimed a Basilica by the Pope John Paul II in 1984.
- Bolgatty Palace was built by the Dutch in India and is located on the scenic Bolgatty island in Kochi. One of the oldest existing Dutch palaces outside Holland, this quaint mansion, built in 1744, by Dutch traders, was later extended and lush green gardens were landscaped around it. The building was then the Governor's palace for the Dutch and later in 1909 was leased to the British. It served as the home of the British Governors, the seat of the British Resident of Cochin during the British regime. In 1947, when India gained independence, the palace became the property of the state and later was converted into a heritage hotel resort.
- Kochi International Marina is a stop for yachts, and the marina is placed ideally within the city, attached to the shoreline of the historic Bolgatty Palace Hotel in Bolgatty Island.
- Willingdon Island is a man-made island named after Lord Willingdon, a former British Viceroy to India. Southern Naval Command, Cochin Harbour, Port Trust headquarters, the best hotels in the city, and major trading centers are situated at Willingdon Island.
- Museum of Kerala History: Important scenes of Kerala history are portrayed through sculptures. Greeting the visitor outside the museum is a statue of Parasurama, the mythological sage who is said to have created Kerala. Other attractions include a contemporary art gallery, doll collection, and art exhibition space etc. Kerala Museum is located at NH Edappally.
- St.Francis Church, originally built in 1503, is the oldest European church in India and has great historical significance as a mute witness to the European colonial struggle in the subcontinent.
- Koonankurishu Church, St. George Orthodox Church (Mattancherry), is a revered pilgrim center. It has paramount position among Orthodox Churches as it is home to the holy relics of St. George. It was built on the land where the historical Koonankurishu Oath took place. The land has become sacred with the footprints of the Persian Prelates, the first Catholicos Mar Thoma I and other venerated fathers of the Orthodox faith. The church was consecrated in 1751, and was renovated later in 1974. Considering the historic importance of the Koonankurish Pally, the Holy Synod elevated the status of the Church and declared it a historic monument as well as a pilgrim center. At present, the church is being renovated again in the 15th century architecture with eco-friendly construction process using compressed soil bricks with no steel and less cement.
- Fort Emmanuel (Immanuel) is a former Portuguese fort at the Fort Kochi beach.
- Pallipuram Fort was built by the Portuguese in 1503. It is the oldest existing European fort in India. In 1661, the Dutch captured the fort from the Portuguese and, in 1789, sold it to the State of Travancore. This fort is situated in the northern extremity of the Vypeen island.
- Kodungallur Bhagavathy Temple Kodungallur, (anglicised name: Cranganore), is a municipality in the Southwestern border of Thrissur district of Kerala, India. Kodungallur is 29 kilometres (18 mi) northwest of Kochi. It is postulated that the ancient city of Muziris (Muchiripattinam, Mahodayapuram/Vanchi) was devastated by natural calamities—a flood or an earthquake—in 1341. Kurumba Bhagavati Temple (alternatively Kodungallur Bhagavati Temple) is a Hindu temple at Kodungallur
- Parikshit Thampuran Museum
- Kanjiramattom Mosque
- Bastion Bunglow
- Mangalavanam Bird Sanctuary This biosphere reserve located at Central Cochin is a natural habitat to many endangered and regular species of local and migratory birds, as well as mangrove vegetation. In 2006, the sanctuary was home to 194 birds of 32 species.

== Around Kochi ==
- Athirappilly Falls is in the neighboring Thrissur district and is around 60 km from Kochi. The Chalakudy River, 145 kilometres (90 mi) long, originates in the Anamudi mountains (Western Ghats) and flows through the Vazhachal Forest toward the Arabian Sea. Forest wildlife includes the Asiatic elephant, tiger, leopard, bison, sambar, and lion-tailed macaque. Plantations in the area contain teak, bamboo, and eucalyptus. The river initially runs smoothly but becomes more turbulent as it nears Athirappilly. At Athirappilly Falls, the water surges around big rocks and cascades down in three separate plumes. Below the falls, the river remains turbulent for about 1 kilometre (0.6 mi) until it reaches Kannamkuzhi. Then it calms and flows smoothly until reaching the dam at Imburmuzhi.
- Cherai Beach is a beach is just 30 km from Kochi. The 15 km-long golden beach is shallow, and attracts swimming and sunbathing. Cherai village is a part of Vypin Island.
- Kalady is a popular pilgrim center because it is the birthplace of Sri Adi Sankara, one of India's foremost philosopher-saints who preached the Advaita or monastic philosophy.
- Bhoothathankettu is a dam and tourist site. It is situated in the village of Pindimana, about 50 km from the Kochi. Bhoothathankettu is connected to the Salim Ali/Thattekad Bird Sanctuary, where visitors can see different varieties of birds and animals. The Idamalayar reservoir is about 12 km distance from the site.
- Chottanikkara Temple is a temple of the Hindu mother goddess Bhagawati. Bhagawati is one of the most popular deities in the area, and she is worshipped at the temple, along with Lord Vishnu, in three different forms: as Saraswati in the morning, draped in white; as Bhadrakali at noon, draped in crimson; and as Durga in the evening, decked in blue. Chottanikara Magam is the famous religious festival in the temple.
- Paliam Palace, Chendamangalam is about 42 km from Kochi. The Paliam Palace, residence of the Paliath Achans, hereditary Prime Ministers to the former Maharajas of Kochi, is one of the architectural splendours of Kerala. It is over 450 years old and houses a collection of historic documents and relics.
- Malayattoor is one of the most prominent Christian pilgrim centers in the Ernakulam district of Kerala. The Malayatoor Church of Cochin attracts a large number of devotees from not just Kerala, but also all over India. St. Thomas is believed to have landed in Kerala at Kodungallur (Cranganore) in AD 52. Oral tradition says that while travelling through Malayattor, faced with hostile natives, he fled to the hilltop where he is said to have remained in prayer and that he left his footprints on one of the rocks. According to beliefs, during prayer, he touched a rock, and blood poured from it.
- Kadamattom Church is one of the most famous churches in India. The church was built around the 10th century AD in Indo-Persian architecture. The church is famous for a priest - "Kadamattathu kattanar" - who was known for his supernatural powers. The church also possesses an ancient Persian Cross in one of its Madbaha walls. Poyedam Well and chapel is also another tourist attraction. This church is under the Kandanad Diocese of Jacobite Orthodox Church.
- Pazhoor, Piravom
- Kandanad St. Mary's Orthodox Church is the oldest church in the suburbs of Kochi. Most beautiful altar works can be seen here. This church is in the administration of the Orthodox Church. There is the tomb of the successor of St. Thomas the Apostle, Marthoma IV. He was ruling the whole church by staying in this church as headquarters.
- Fish farm and aqua tourism centre, Vypin, an aquatourism project and fish farms situated at Malipuram and Njarakkal.

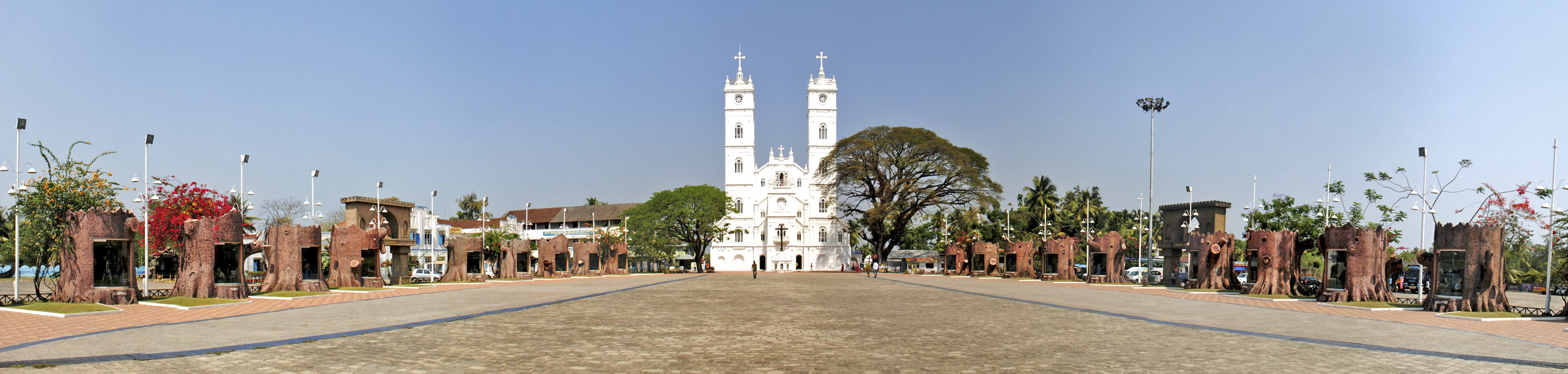
Vallarpadam Church

== Gallery ==
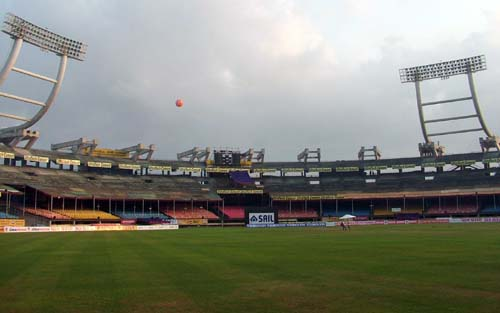
The Jawaharlal Nehru Stadium

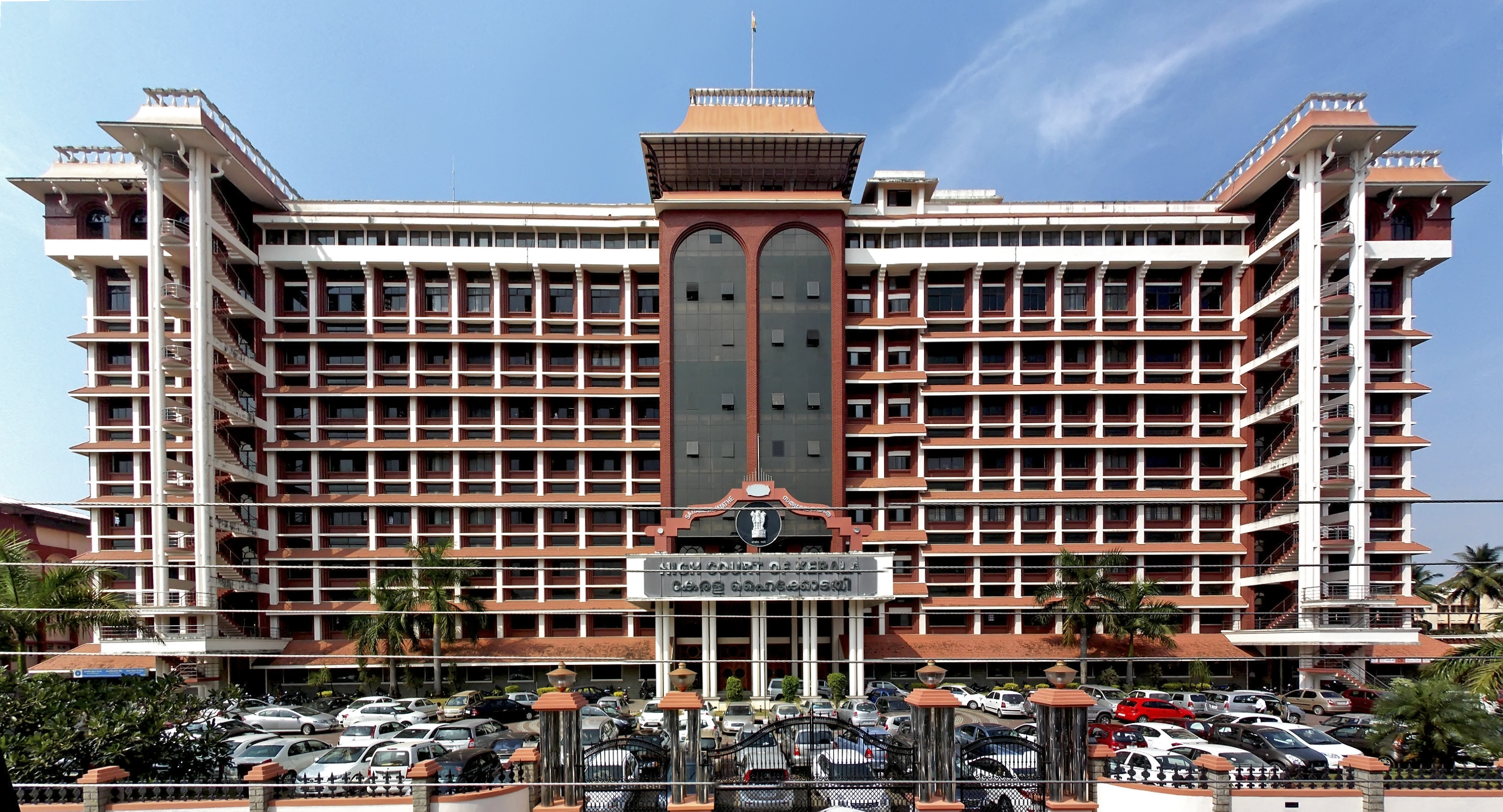
High Court of Kerala

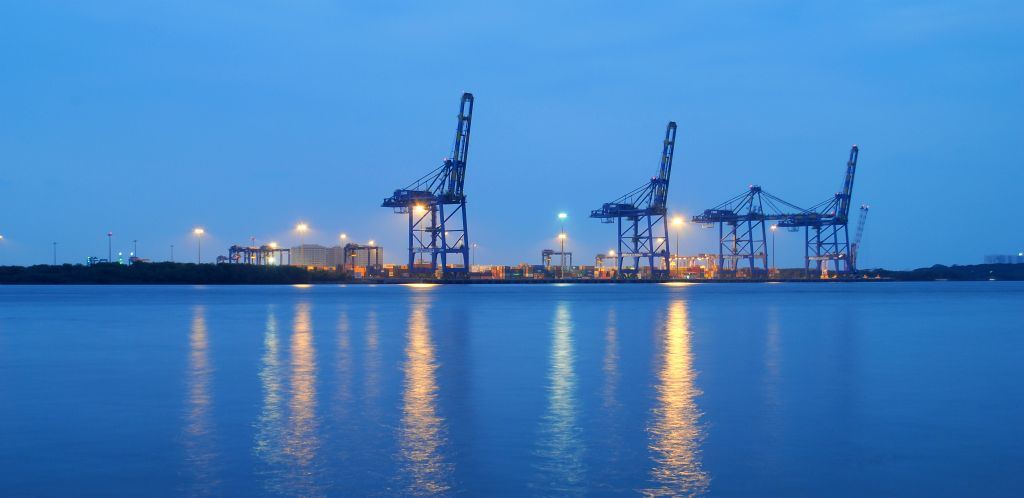
International Container Transshipment Terminal, Kochi in a blue hour

Kadamattom Church

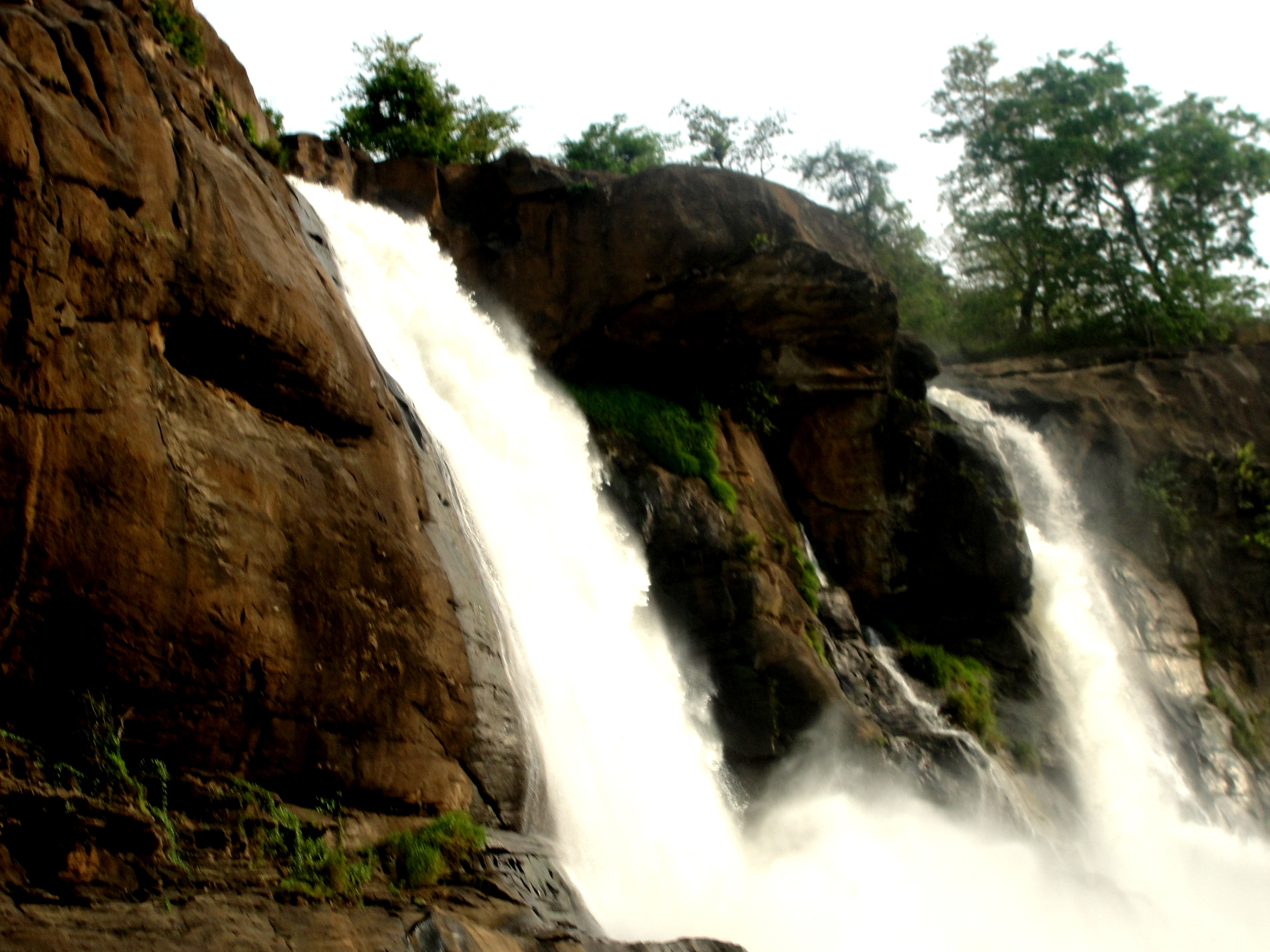
View of the waterfall from the cliff

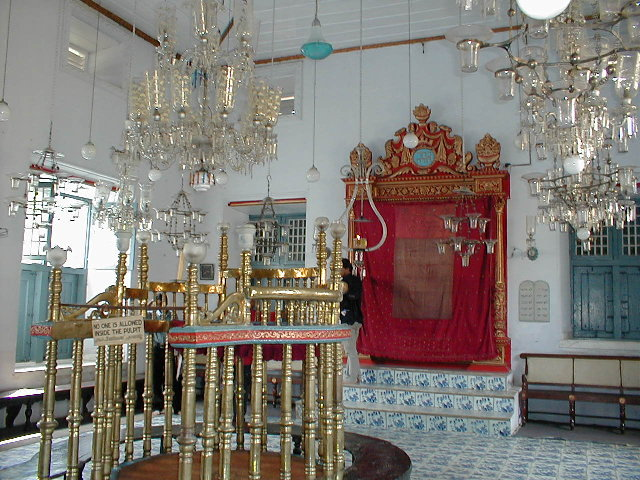
The Paradesi Synagogue in Kochi

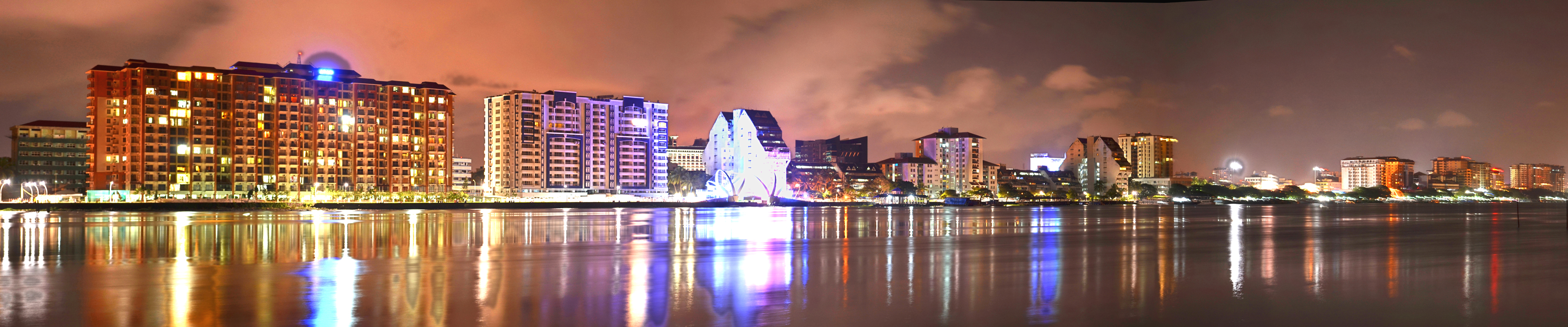
Marine Drive, Kochi

== See also ==
- Tourism in Kerala
