= Jagdish Patel =

Indian politician (born 1962)

Mayor of Surat
- Incumbent
- Assumed office 14 June 2018
- Preceded by: Asmita Shiroya

Personal details
- Born: Jagdish Parshotambhai Patel; 4 March 1962 (age 64) Shakhpur, Lathi
- Party: Bharatiya Janata Party
- Spouse: Nimisha Patel
- Children: 2
- Website: Government website

Jagdish Balar, better known as Jagdish Patel, is a BJP politician from Surat, Gujarat. He was the 36th Mayor of Surat / Surat Municipal Corporation. He is an Ayurvedic practitioner and a trustee of Kiran Hospital, run by Surat Builders and Diamond Traders.

He is supporting "Youth Against Injustice Foundation" and its mission "Youth Against Rape".

== See also ==
- Surat Municipal Corporation
- Bharatiya Janata Party
- Surat
