= Dutch Cemetery, Fort Kochi =

Kochi Dutch Cemetery
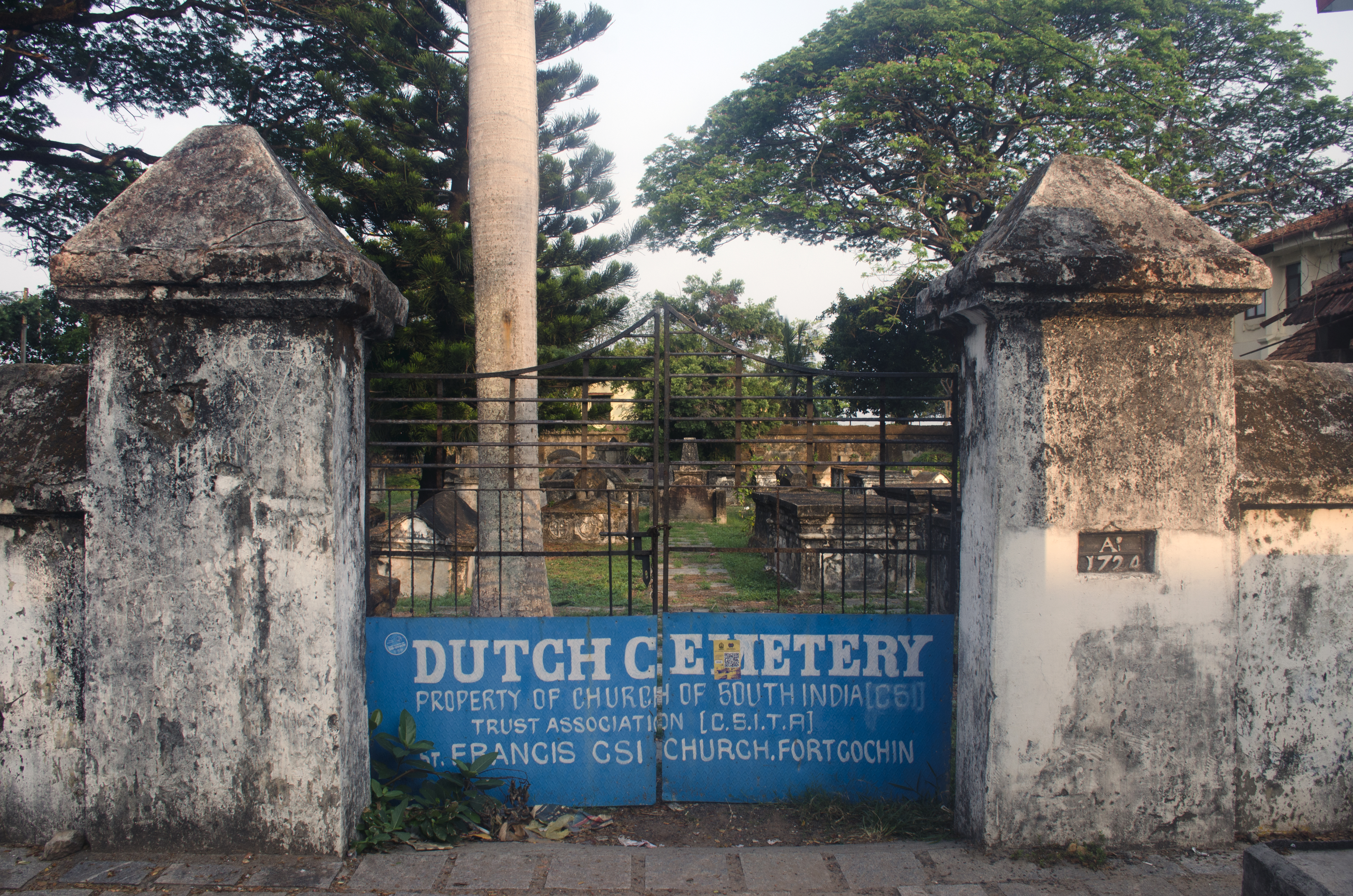
- Entrance of Dutch Cemetery
- Interactive map of Kochi Dutch Cemetery
- 9.9642°N 76.2383°E
- Location: Fort Kochi, Kochi, Kerala, India

History
- Built: 1724

Site notes
- Architectural style: Dutch colonial
- Governing body: Archaeological Survey of India

Kochi Dutch Cemetery is a heritage cemetery located at Fort Kochi, in Kochi, in the Indian state of Kerala.

== History ==
In 1663, the Dutch captured Cochin from the Portuguese, established the town as an administrative centre of Dutch Malabar and trading settlement of the Dutch East India Company on the Malabar Coast. The cemetery was founded in 1724. It served as the main burial ground for Dutch colonial officials, army officers, merchant communities living in Kochi. It is the oldest Dutch Cemetery in India and protected by the Archaeological Survey of India (ASI). There are 104 epitaphs and tombs, most of them built in the Dutch architectural style.

== Gallery ==
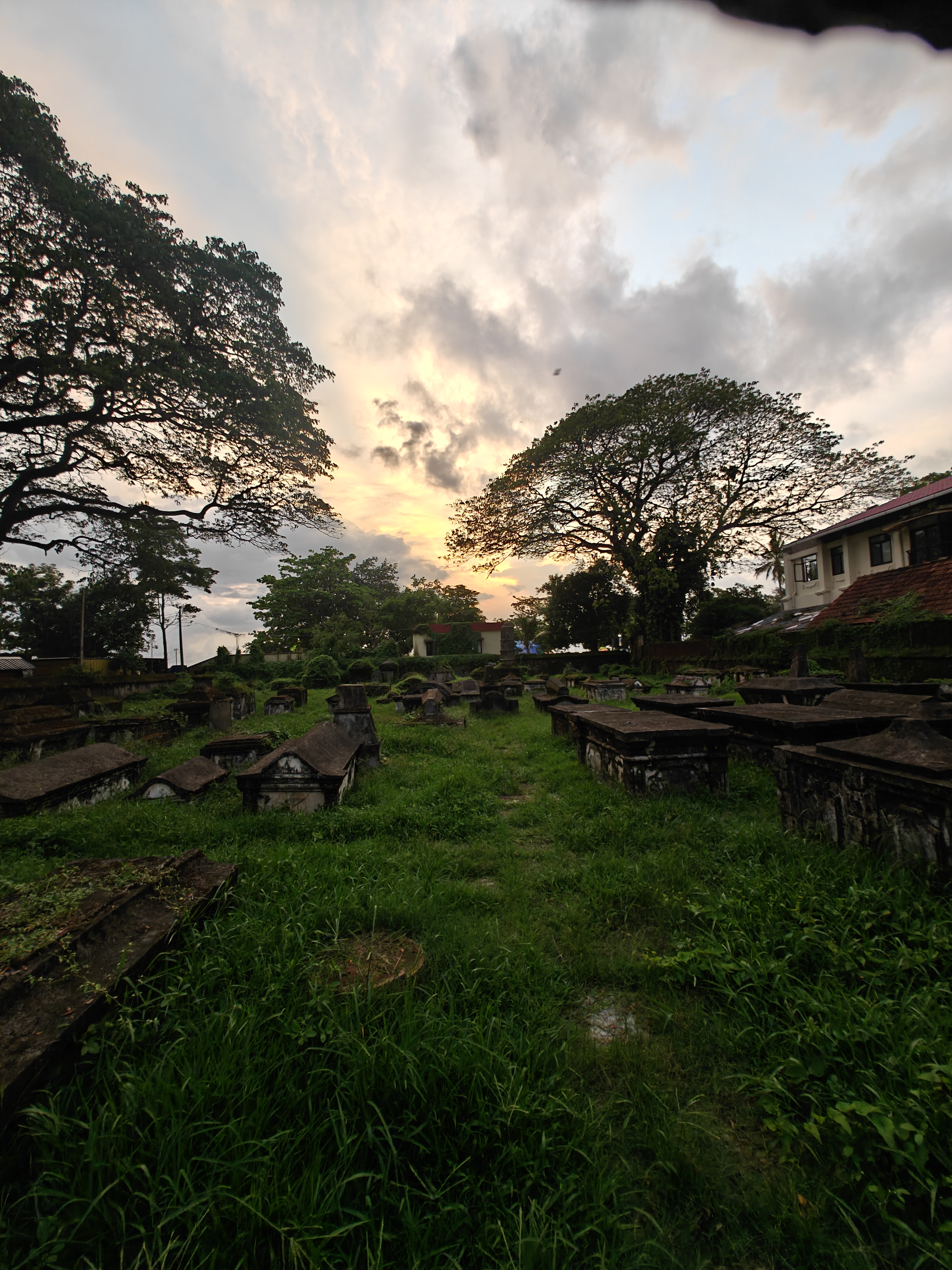
Kochi Dutch Cemetery in 2026

Complete view of the Dutch Cemetery

A grave in the Cemetery

Tombs in the Dutch Cemetery

an obelisk in the Cemetery

== See also ==
- Vasco House, Kochi
- Thakur House, Kochi
- Dutch Cemetery, Surat
