= Dutch Cemetery, Surat =

Cemetery in Gujarat

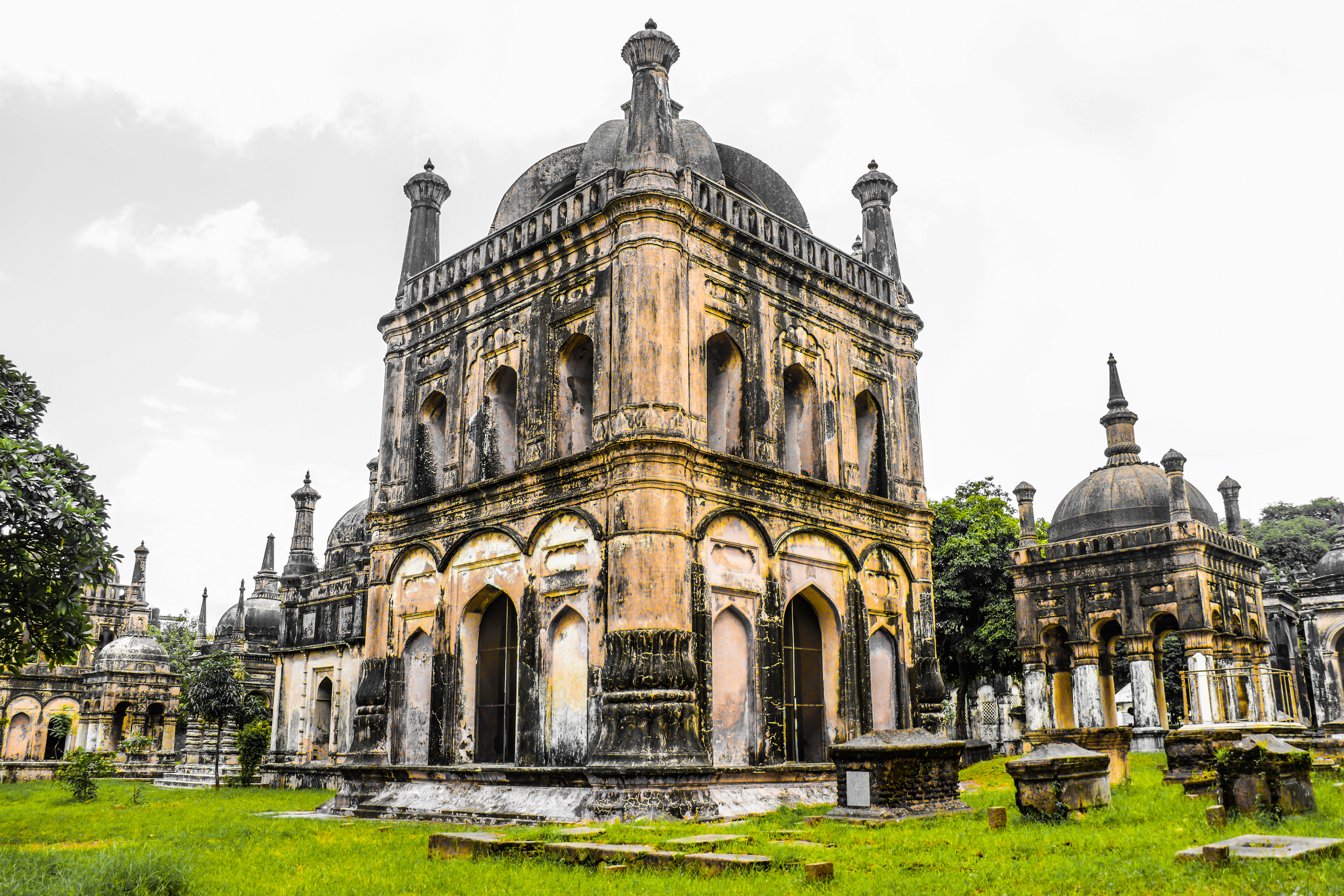
- Tomb in the Dutch cemetery
- Interactive map of Dutch Cemetery, Surat

Details
- Established: 17th century
- Location: Gulam Falia, Nanpura, Surat, Gujarat
- Country: India
- Type: Dutch/Armenian cemetery
- Owned by: Archaeological Survey of India

Dutch Cemetery, Surat is a historic colonial-era cemetery situated at Gulam Falia, Nanpura in Surat in the Indian state of Gujarat. It is a protected monument of national importance maintained by the Archaeological Survey of India.

== History ==
During the seventeenth century, Dutch East India Company stationed at Surat and the city became one of the most important trading port. As the Dutch as well as Armenian settlement expanded, the cemetery was established for the burial of company officials, Armenian and other European residents of the area. The cemetery is renowned for its monumental mausoleums and Indo-European architectures.

== Notable burials ==
- Hendrik van Rheede (1636–1691), Governor of Dutch Malabar.

== Gallery ==
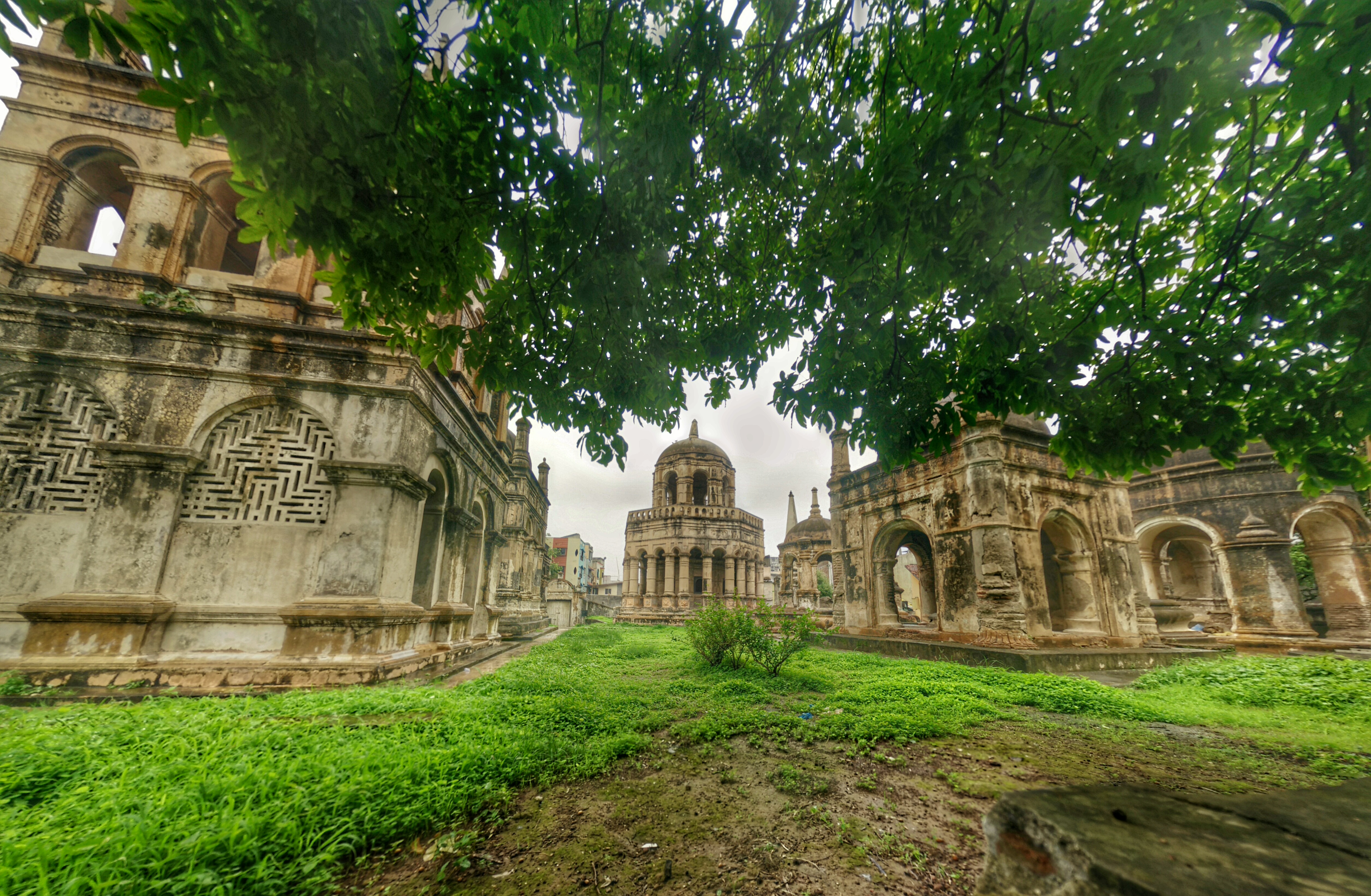

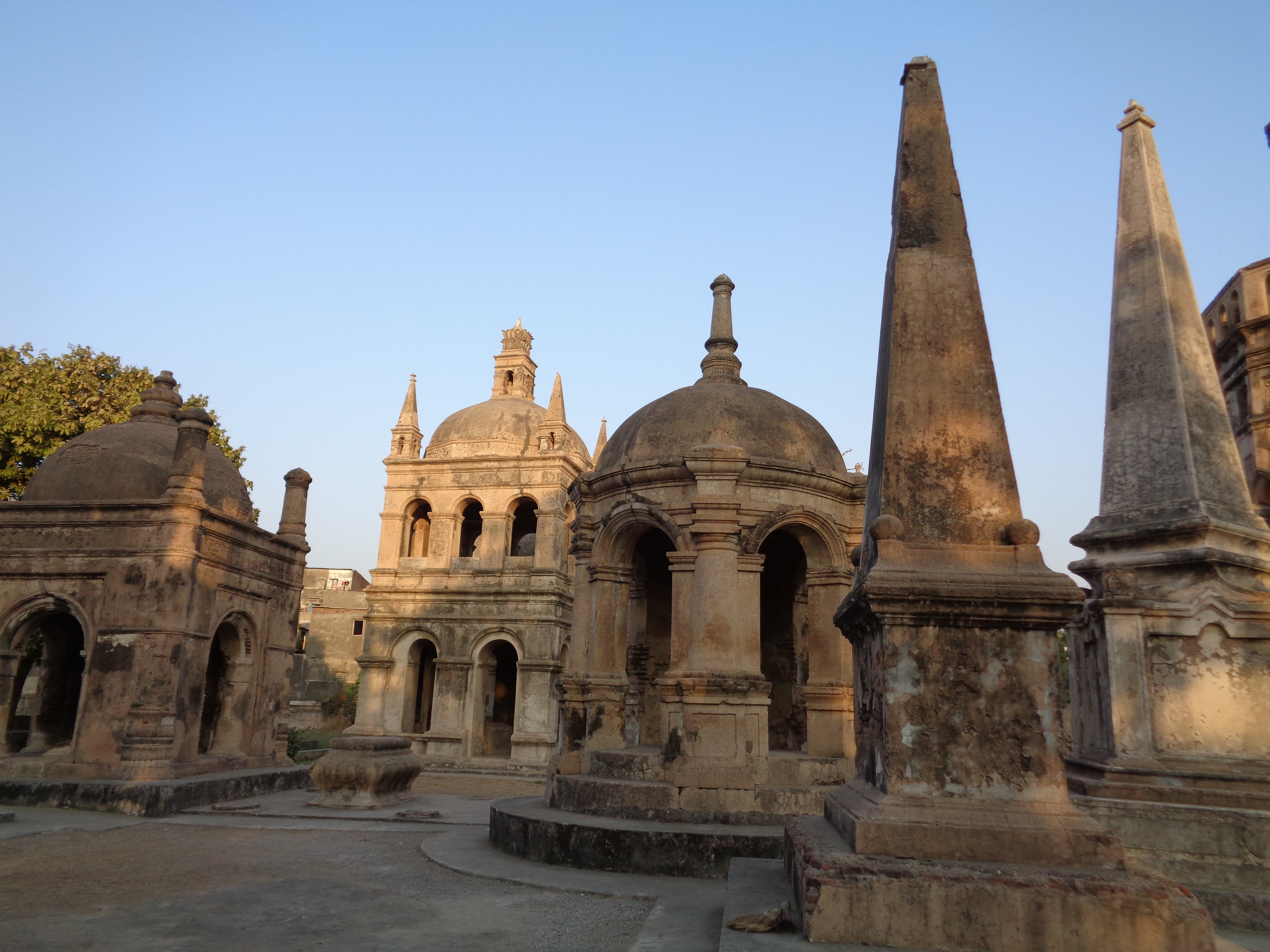

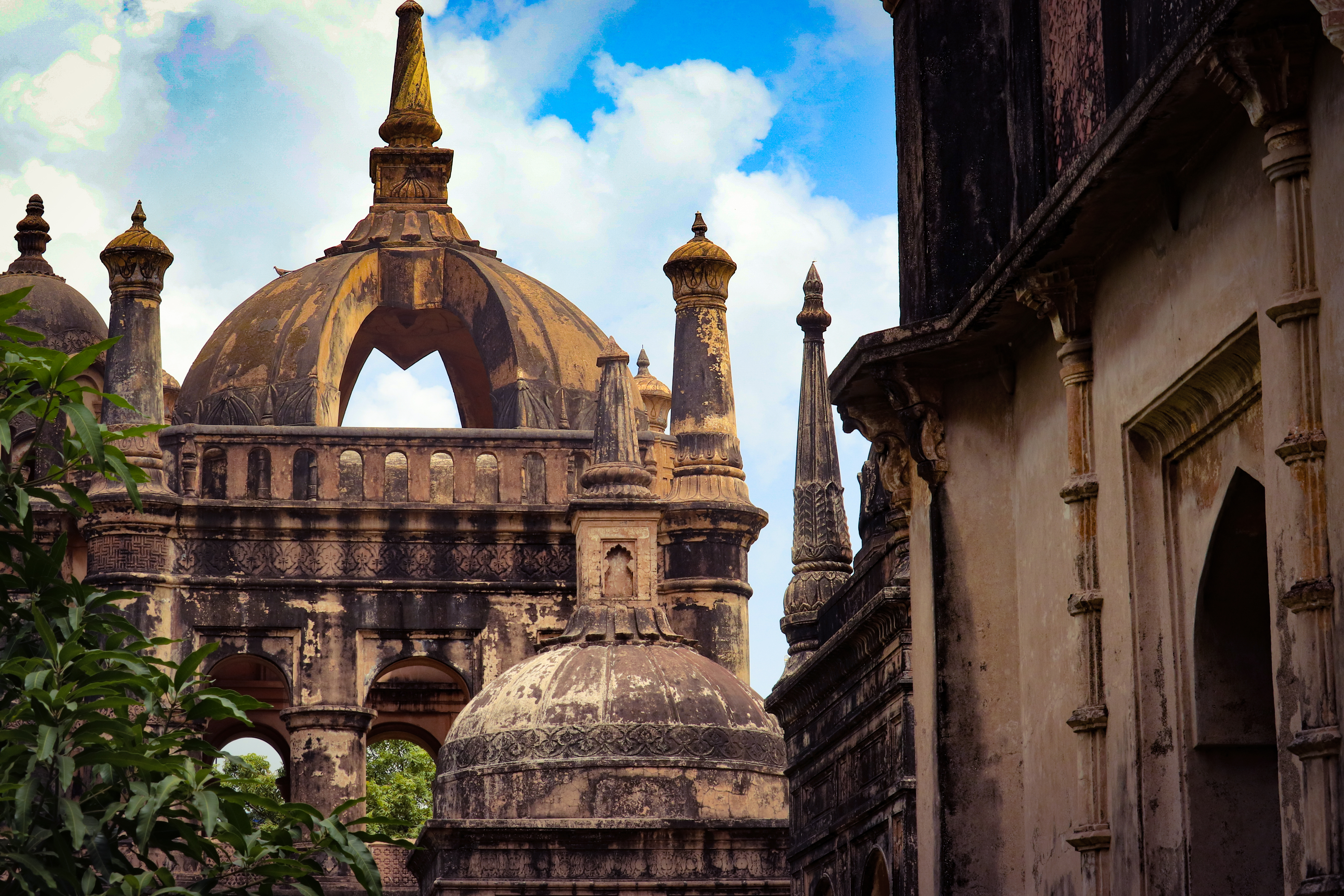

== See also ==
- British Cemetery of Surat
- Dutch Cemetery, Murshidabad
- Dutch Cemetery, Fort Kochi
- Dutch Tombs, Ahmedabad
