= Kiran Hospital =

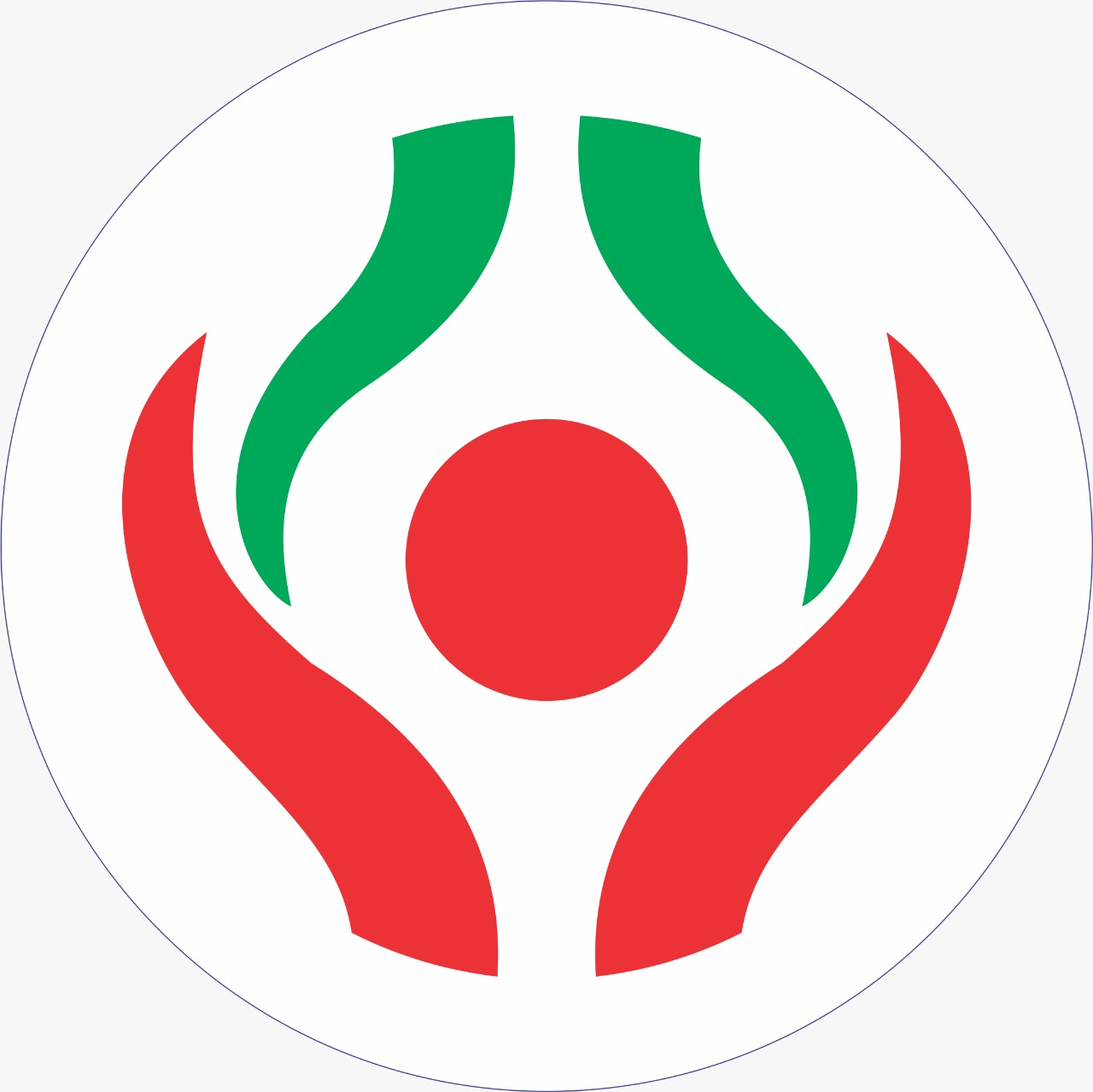

Geography
- Location: Surat, Gujarat, India
- Coordinates: 21.218744°N 72.836676°E

Services
- Emergency department: Yes
- Beds: 900

History
- Founded: 2017

Links
- Website: www.kiranhospital.com
- Lists: Hospitals in India

Kiran Hospital is a hospital located in Katargam, Surat, India. The hospital was inaugurated by the Prime Minister of India Shri Narendra Modi on 17 April 2017. Kiran hospital is managed by Samast Patidar Aarogya Trust (SPAT). The chairman of Kiran hospital is Mathurbhai M. Savani.

== Construction ==
The hospital was built on a 3.53-acre (1.43 ha) plot of land in Katargam area of Surat. The land for Hospital was allotted by the Municipal Corporation of Surat. The total cost to build the hospital was Rs 500 crore.

== Naming of hospital ==
Kiran Gems's Vallabhbhai Patel donated Rs. 52 crores for the christening Kiran Hospital's name. Lavji Daliya, also known as Lavji Badshah donated Rs 11.11 crore for putting up the first brick of the building in his name. Samir Bhansali and his younger brothers donated Rs. 5 cr for construction of the emergency ward of the hospital. Savji Dholakia and Govind Dholakia donated Rs 1.2 crore and Rs 0.8 crore respectively for the construction of two floors each in the hospital.
