= British Cemetery, Surat =

Burial ground in Gujarat State, India

British Cemetery of Surat
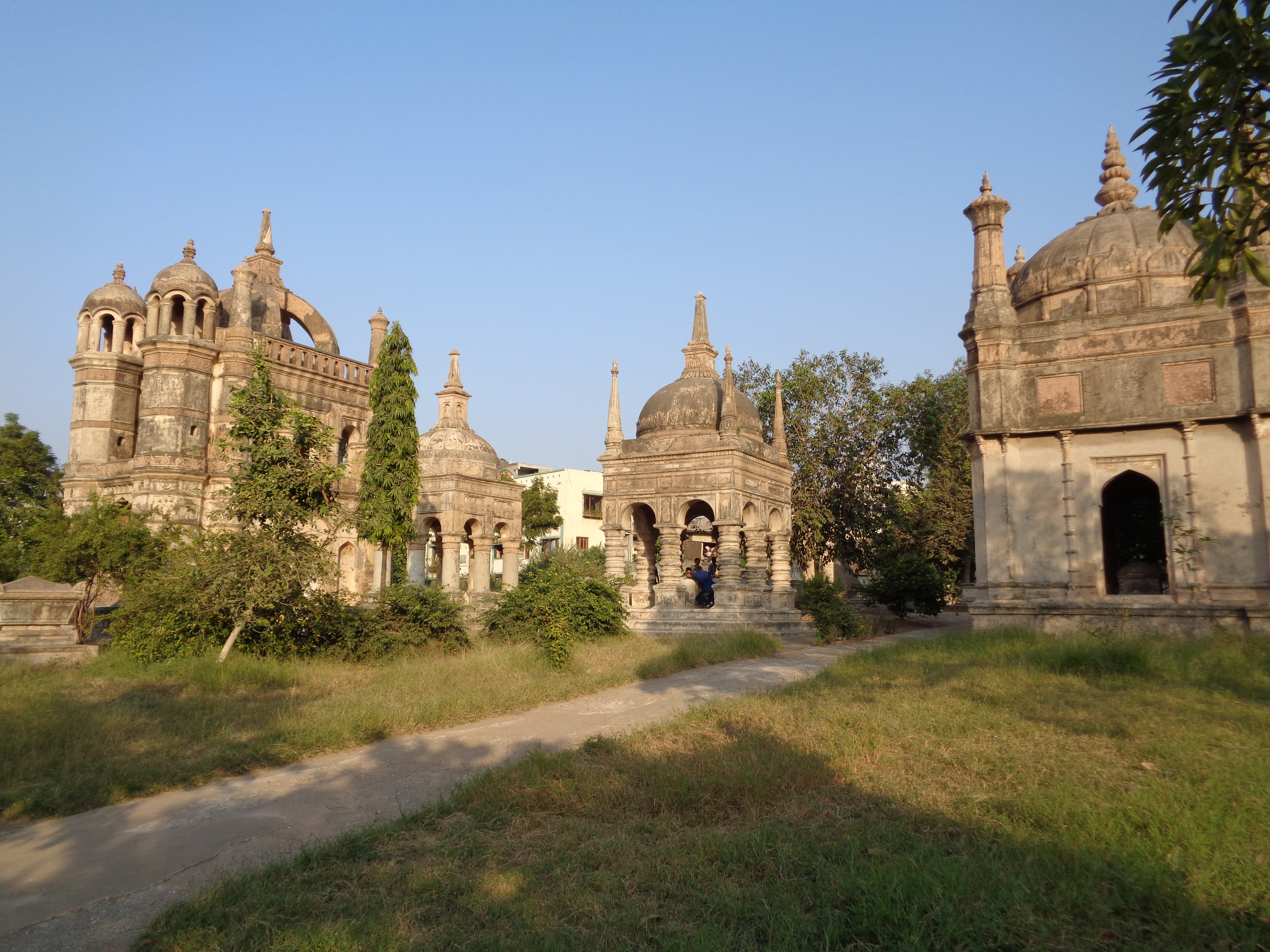
- Old English Tombs at Surat
- Interactive map of British Cemetery of Surat

Details
- Established: 1883; 143 years ago
- Location: Katargam Darwaja,Surat, India
- Country: India
- Coordinates: 21°12′45″N 72°49′43″E
- No. of graves: 400

British Cemetery of Surat also known as the English Cemetery, located at Katargam Darwaja in Surat, walking distance from the Dutch Cemetery, Surat. The British Cemetery was established around 1651, and contains graves of former governors of Bombay Presidency and a number of officials of East India Company.

== History ==
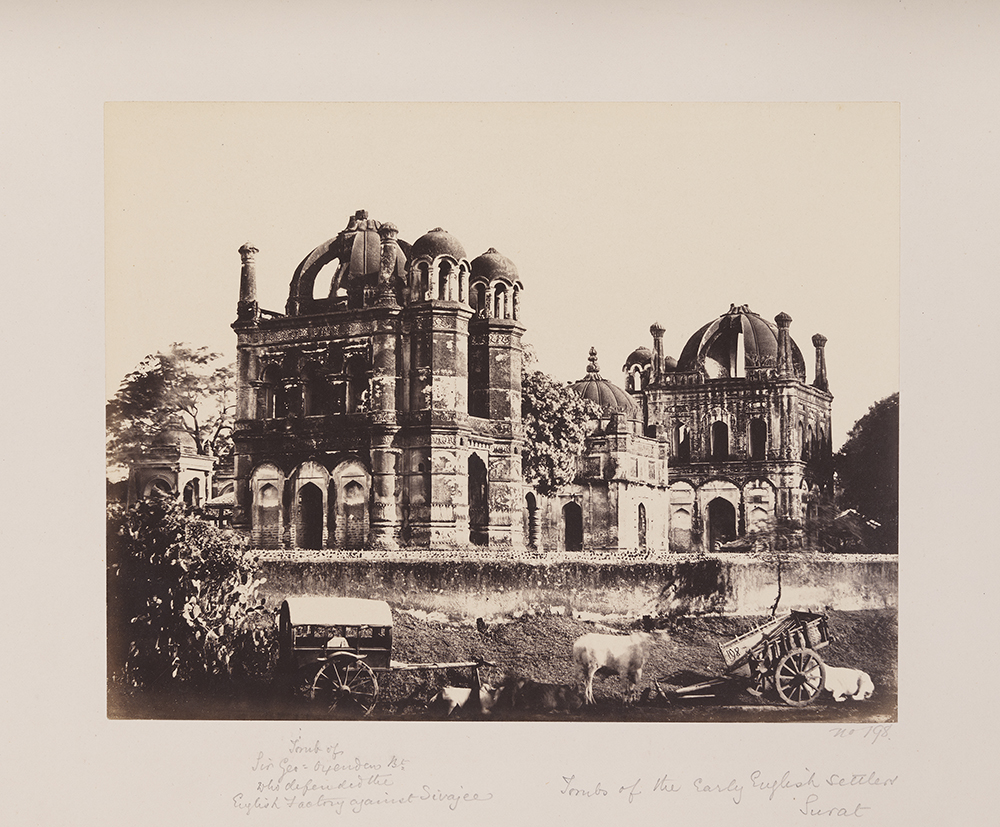
British Cemetery

British Cemetery of Surat was established during the seventeenth century when the East India Company was established in Indian city of Surat. Dr George Buist visited in 1855 and recorded a number of inscriptions.

== Notable burials ==
English Cemetery

- George Oxenden, Governor of Bombay
- Gerald Aungier, Governor of Bombay
- Bartholomew Harris, Governor of Bombay

== See also ==
- Surat
- History of Surat
