= Rajendra Desai =

Indian politician

Mayor of Surat Municipal Corporation
- Incumbent
- Assumed office 2010

Personal details
- Born: Surat, India
- Party: Bhartiya Janata Party
- Profession: Politician

Rajendra Desai is former Mayor of Surat, India and a senior Bhartiya Janata Party politician. He served as the city Mayor from 2010 to 2013.Then he was the municipal councillor from Athwa-Nanpura ward.

== See also ==
- Surat Municipal Corporation
- Bharatiya Janata Party
