= Vasco House, Kochi =

Coordinates: 9°57′58″N 76°14′29″E

Vasco house
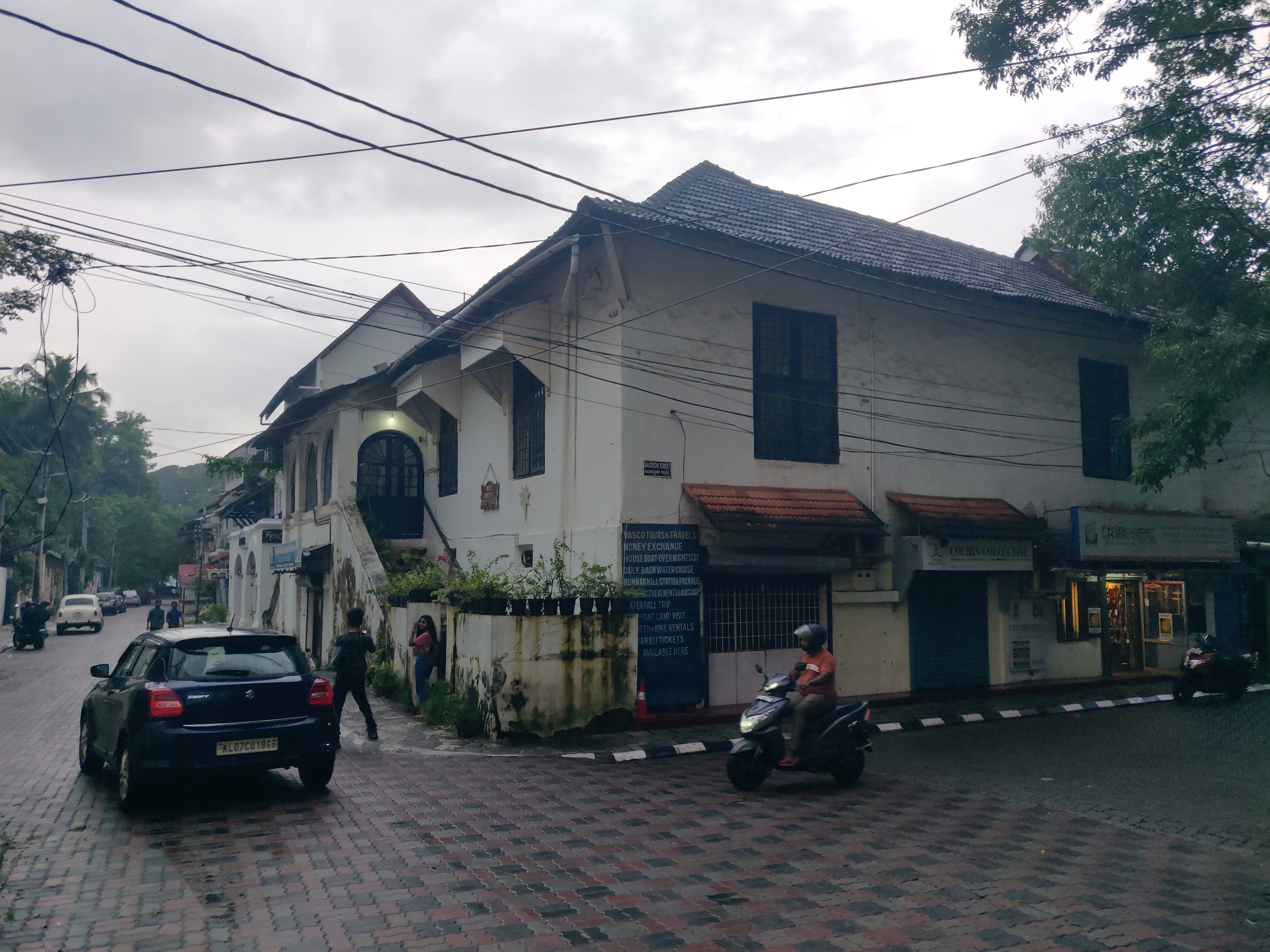
- Vasco House in 2023
- Interactive map of Vasco house
- Location: Fort Kochi, Kerala, India

History
- Built: Early 16th century

Site notes
- Architectural style: European style

Vasco House is a notable tourist site located in Fort Kochi, in the South India state of Kerala. It is one of the oldest Portuguese residences in Fort Kochi. The house is believed to have been the residence of Vasco da Gama, which was constructed in the first half of the sixteenth century. Vasco House has stark white walls, a Prussian blue glass pane windows and a balcony cum verandahs of the traditional European style of that era.

There is no documentary or other proof that the renowned explorer Vasco da Gama resided there, except from a picture of him that stands out among other wall hangings and photos in the house. It is located behind St. Francis Church at the intersection of Rose and Ridsdale Street, and is one of the most photographed buildings in Fort Kochi. Vasco House has become a popular filming location of Malayalam movies since it appeared in the 2007 Malayalam film Big B, starring Mammootty.

== See also ==
- Thakur House, Kochi
