= Katargam =

Katargam North Zone
- Suburb
- Location in Gujarat, India
- Coordinates: 21°13′42″N 72°49′44″E
- Country: India
- State: Gujarat
- District: Surat

Government
  - Body: Surat Municipal Corporation

Area
  - Total: 37 km^{2} (14 sq mi)
- Elevation: 12 m (39 ft)

Population (2008)
  - Total: 765,000
  - Density: 21,000/km^{2} (54,000/sq mi)

Languages
  - Official: Gujarati, Hindi
- Time zone: UTC+5:30 (IST)
- Telephone code: 0261
- Vehicle registration: GJ5
- Nearest city: Surat
- Literacy: 89%
- Civic agency: Surat Municipal Corporation

Katargam is a suburb in Surat city and host of the world famous Surat diamond industry. Today Katargam is one of the best developed areas in Surat city and also boasts of diamond industries. It is home to the upper middle class of the city's residents. The area is also known as dense Concrete Jungle. It was a Nagar Panchayat in 1970s but was later amalgamated in Surat Municipal Corporation. Due to the development of Diamond Industries in the town it spurred growth in population and its population is around 0.7 million as of 2008 estimates. The majority of the population is from Saurastra also known as Katiyawad. The town has grown in size in the year 2006 with an amalgamation of municipalities of Amroli, Chapprabhatta, Kosad. It has a very famous riverside view called Cause Way which is developed on the bank of river Tapi. Surat city has been developed mainly due to River Tapi.

About in 1730 first Baghdadi Jew Joseph Semah arrived from Baghdad to Surat and set up the Surat Synagogue here (It was a big Port of British India. Now part of Gujarat state and commercial capital of Gujarat in western part of India). They established Synagogue and Cemetery in Katargam area of the city. Still there is a graveyard in the city but in very bad condition

== See also ==
- List of tourist attractions in Surat
