= Thakur House, Kochi =

Thakur House
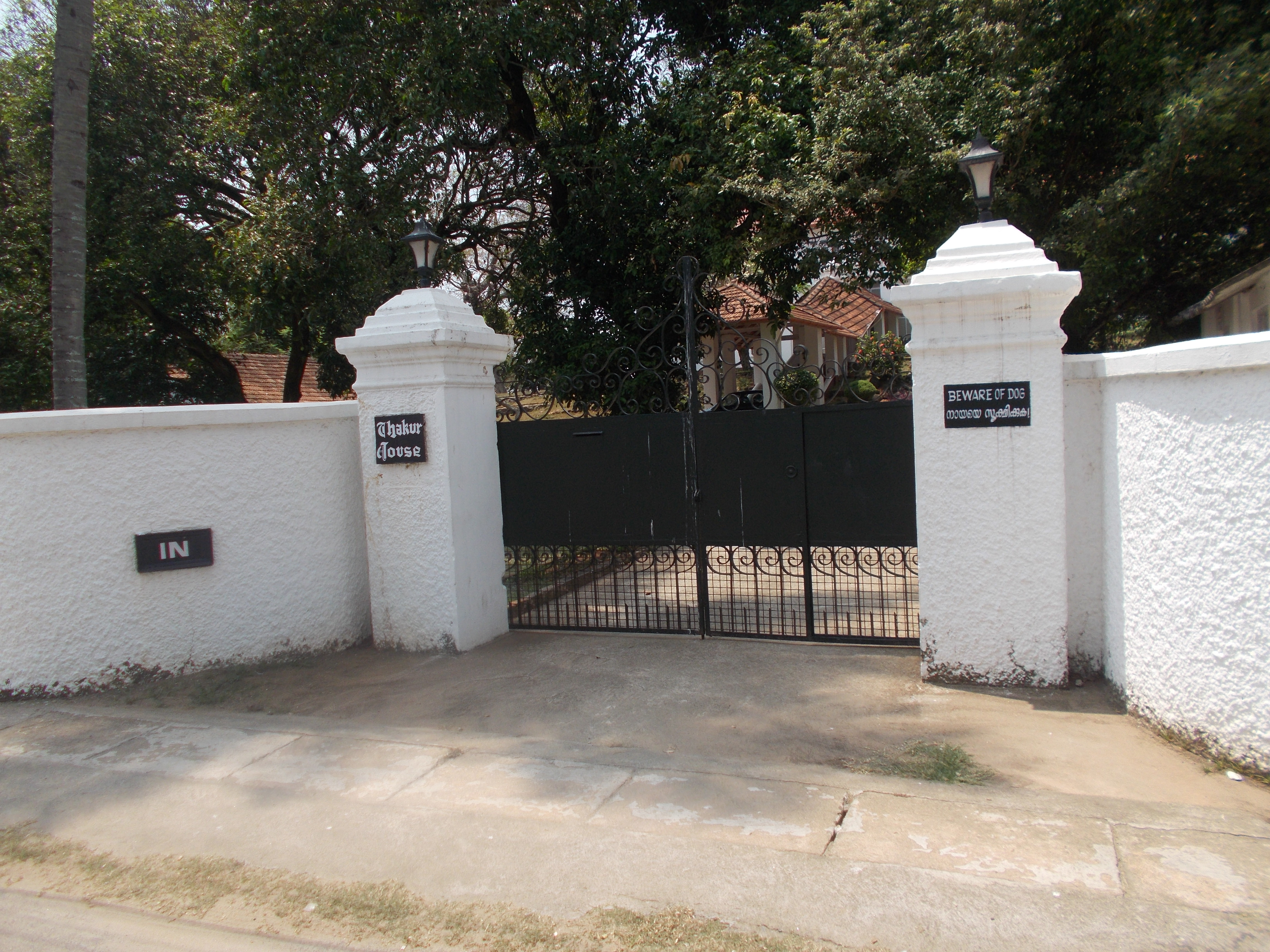
- The entrance of the house in 2016
- Location: Fort Kochi, Kerala, India

History
- Built: 18th century

Site notes
- Architectural style: Dutch

The Thakur House is an historical building located in Fort Kochi in the South Indian state of Kerala. It was constructed on the site of the Gelderland Bastion, one of the seven bastions of the old Dutch fort. Previously known as Kunal or Hill Bungalow, it was the residence of the National Bank of India's managers during the British Raj in India. For decades, the house on a cliff overlooking the sea has been a prominent landmark in Fort Kochi.

The house was occupied by a prominent Spice trade family of Mattancherry in the late nineteenth century when the Dutch left India in the 19th century. In 1977, Ram Bahadur Thakur and Company, a major tea trading company, purchased the property and utilised it as their residence, giving rise to the name Thakur House. It is believed that the house includes a network of tunnels that connect various Fort Kochi locations, including the Bishop's home and St Francis Church. When the Dutch were in power, they used this home as a club and community hall for the Dutch East India Company.

== See also ==
- Vasco House, Kochi
