= Dutch Cemetery, Murshidabad =

Christian cemetery in West Bengal, India

Dutch Cemetery
- An ASI Listed Monument
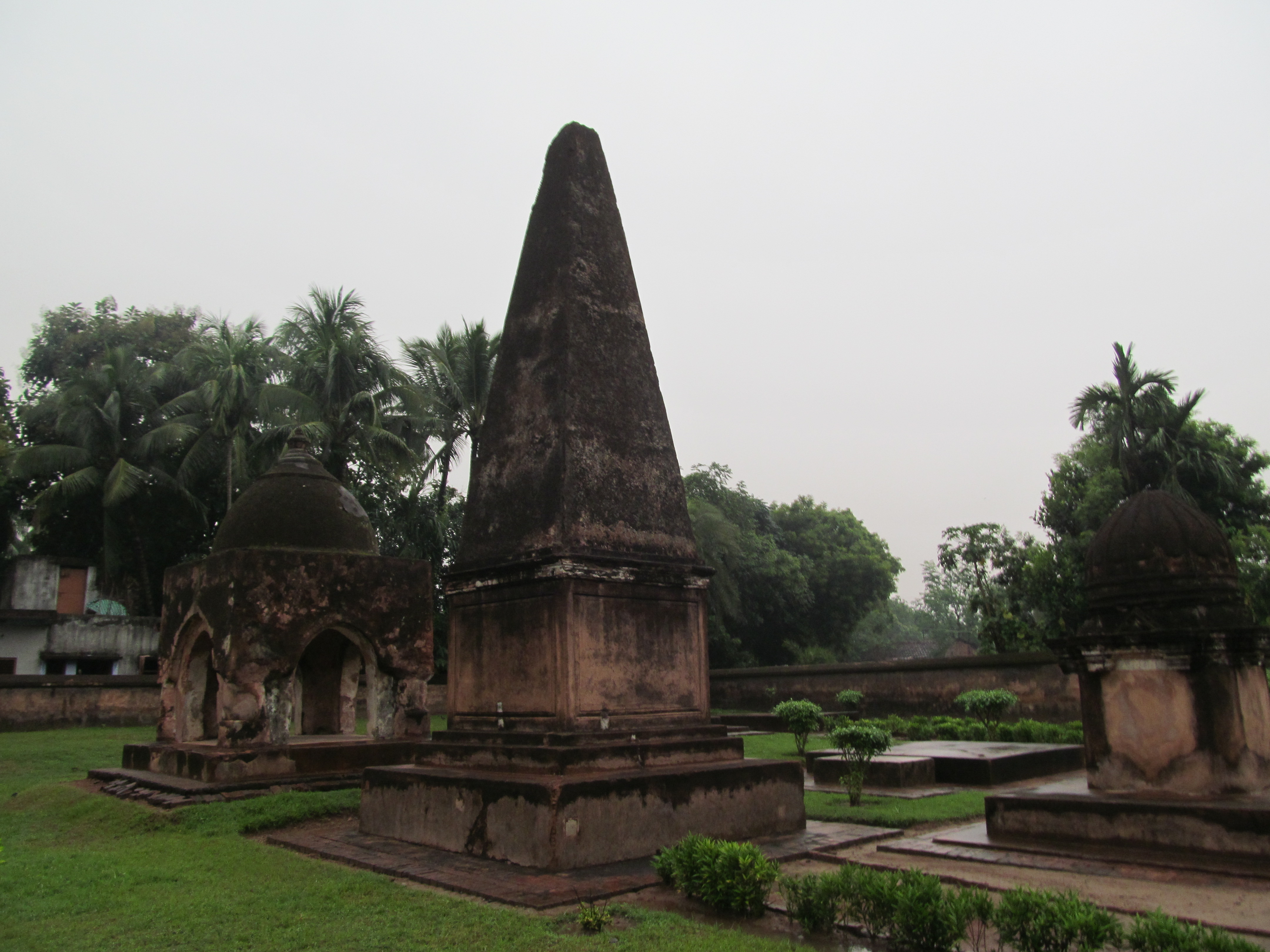
- Dutch Cemetery
- Interactive map of Dutch Cemetery

Details
- Established: early 18th-19th century
- Location: Kalikapur, Murshidabad, West Bengal
- Country: India
- Coordinates: 24.123611°N 88.266667°E
- Owned by: Archaeological Survey of India

Dutch Cemetery is a heritage Christian cemetery situated at Kalikapur, Cossimbazar in the Berhampore CD block in the Berhampore subdivision of Murshidabad district, in the Indian state of West Bengal.

== History ==
In the 18th century, Murshidabad was an active trading post that not only attracted the British but also the Dutch and the Armenians, all of whom settled here in different times. The Dutch Cemetery has “47 tombs and obelisks etc. and the oldest being that of Daniel Van der Muyl who died in 1721 AD.” The Babulbona Residency Cemetery, as well as the British and Dutch cemeteries in neighbouring Cossimbazar have not been maintained well, although they are state protected monuments. At present there are 22 graves extant in the cemetery.

According to the Archaeological Survey of India, as mentioned in the List of Monuments of National Importance in West Bengal, the Dutch Cemetery is an ASI Listed Monument.

== Gallery ==
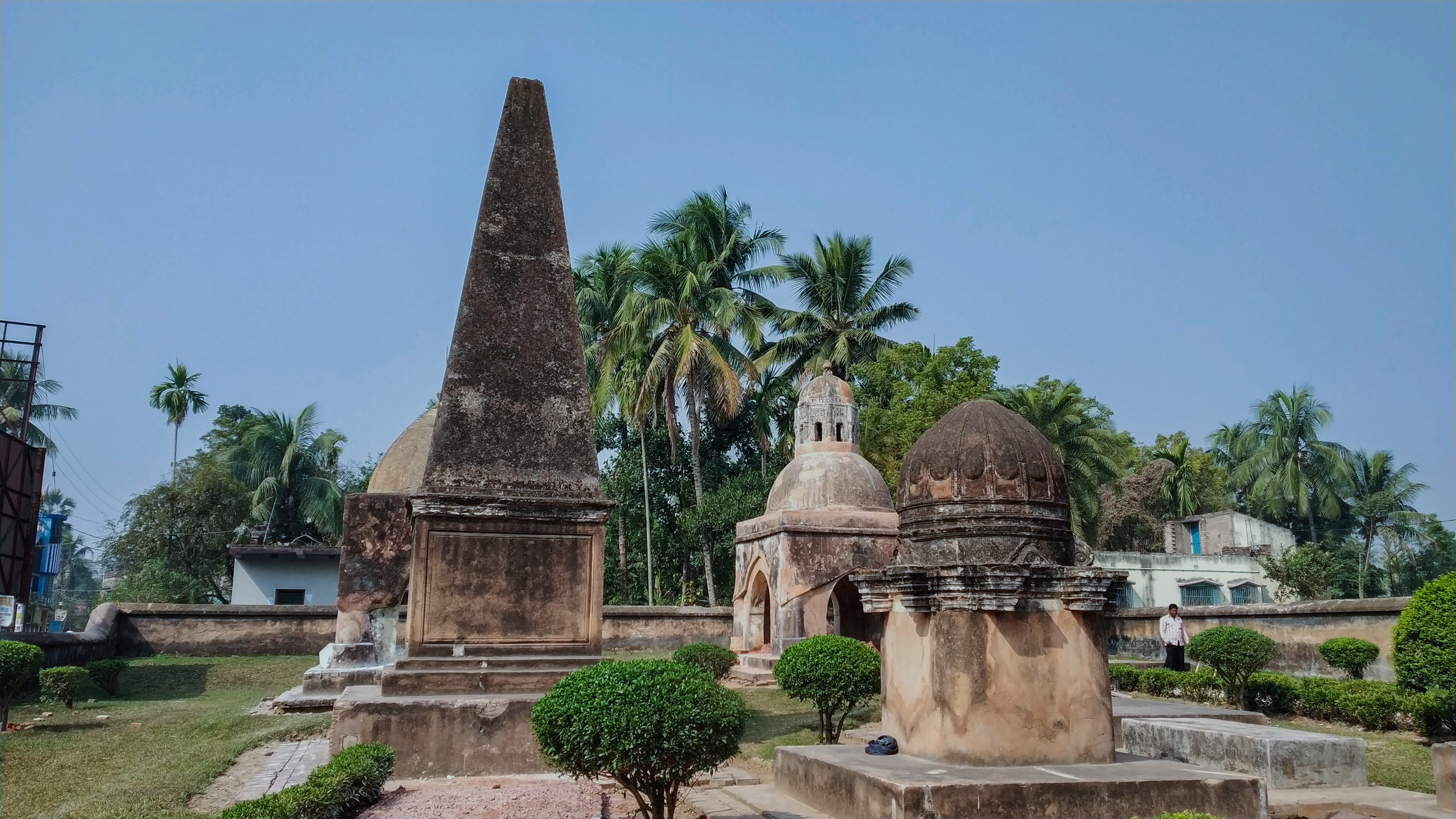

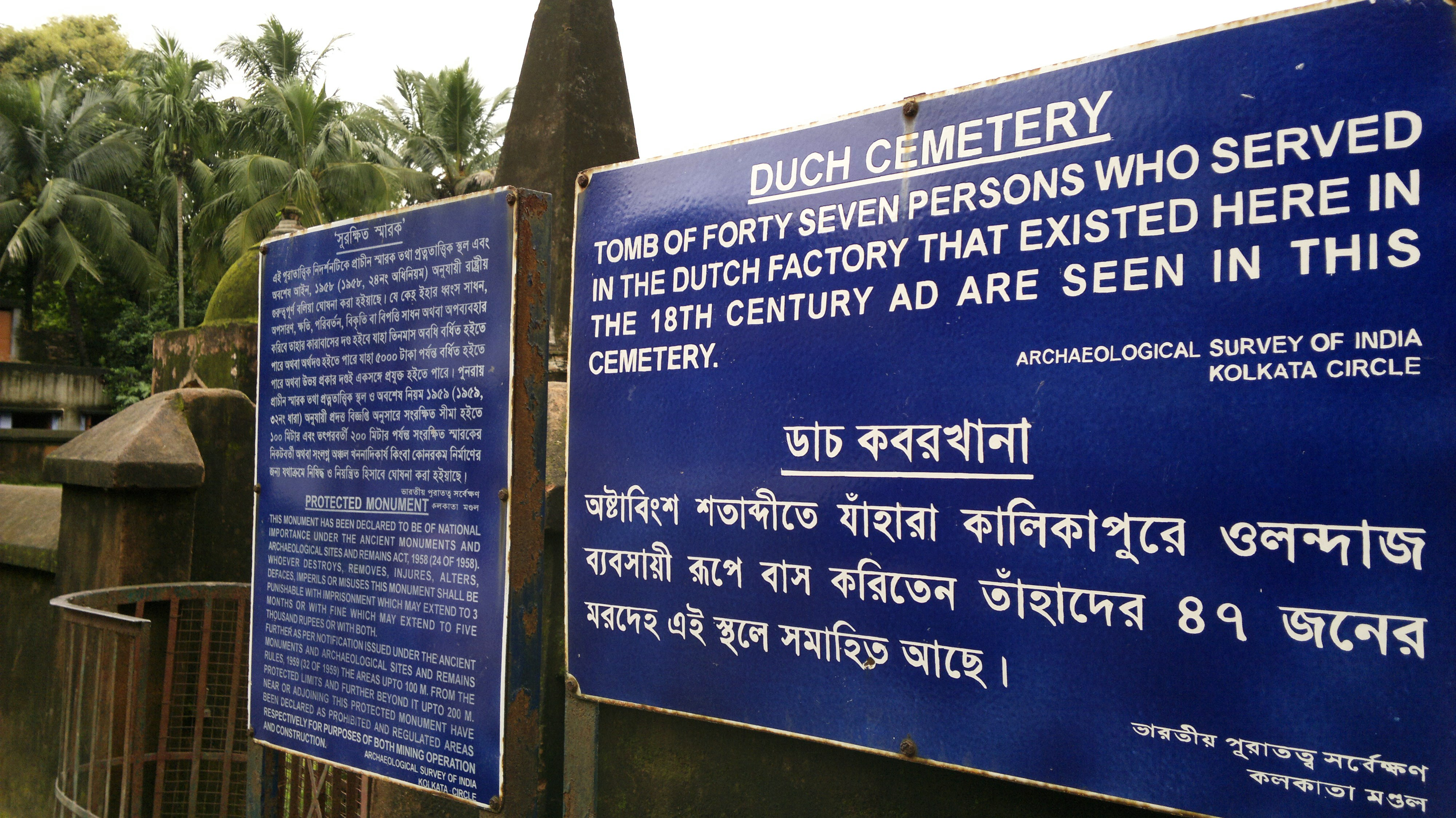

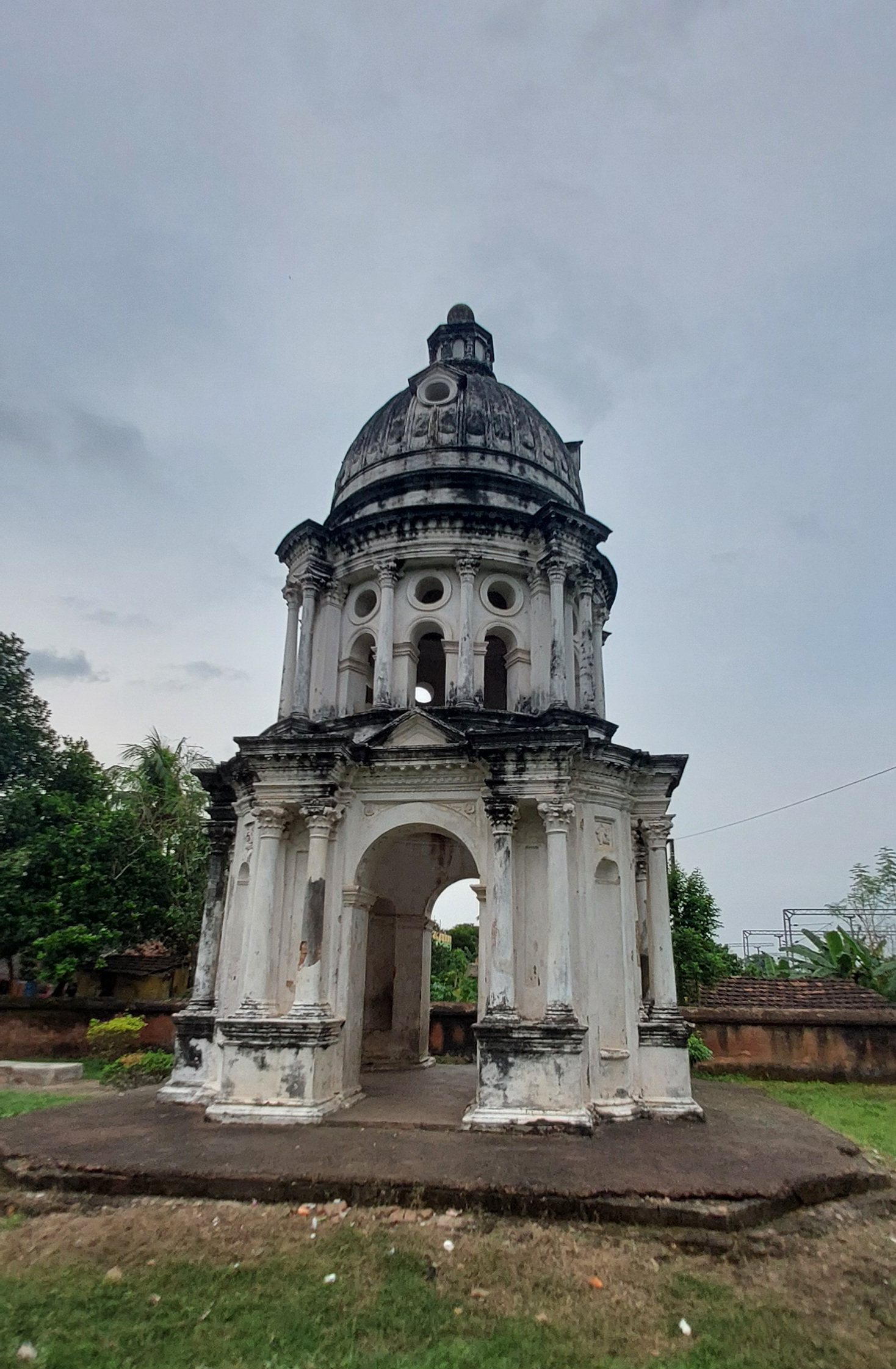

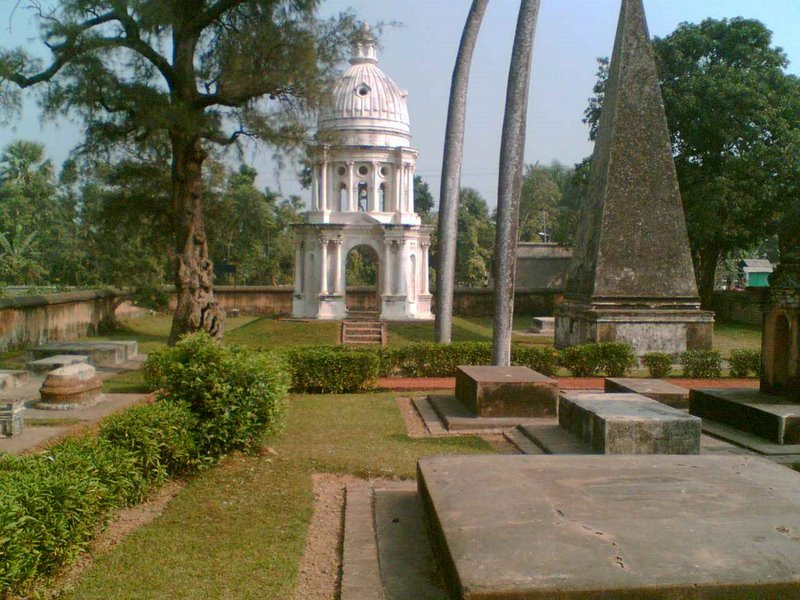

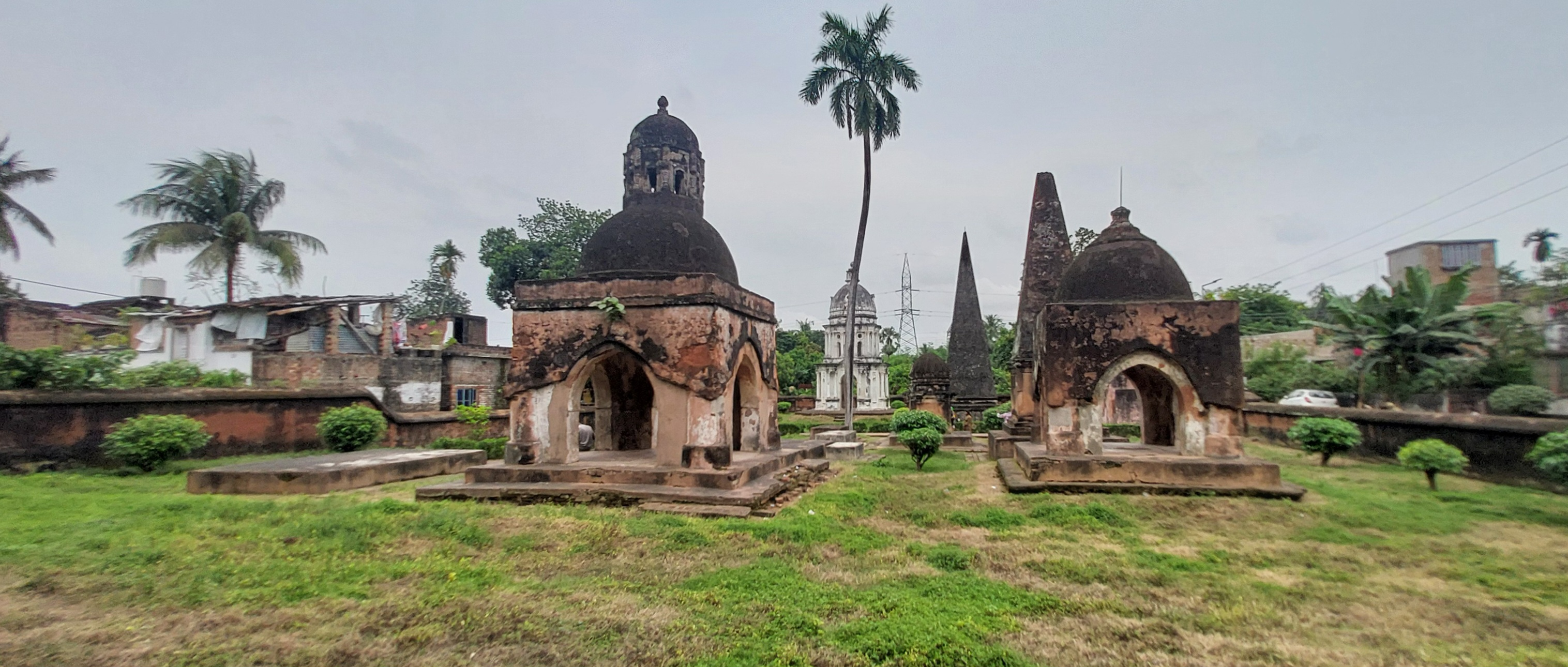

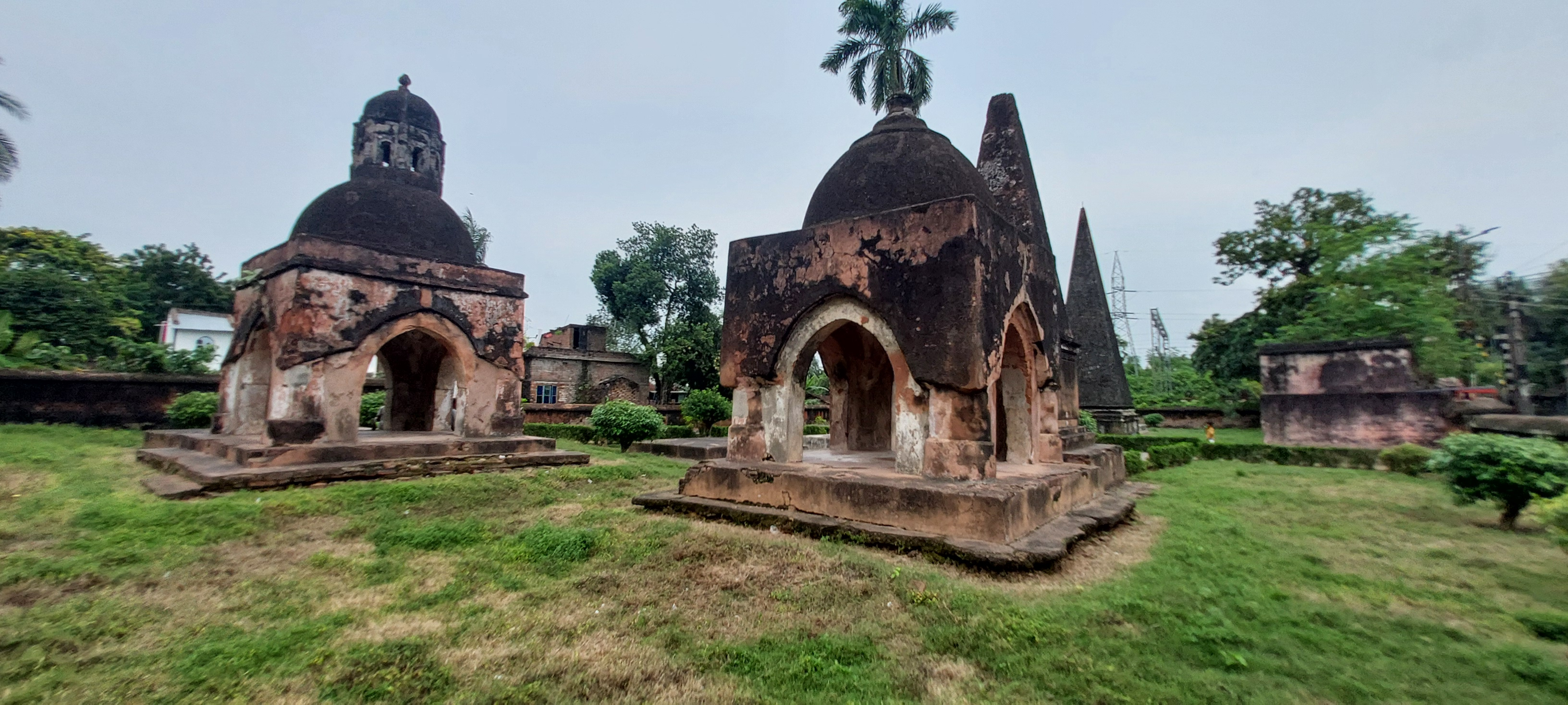
