= Cochin Carnival =

New year festival held at Kochi, Kerala

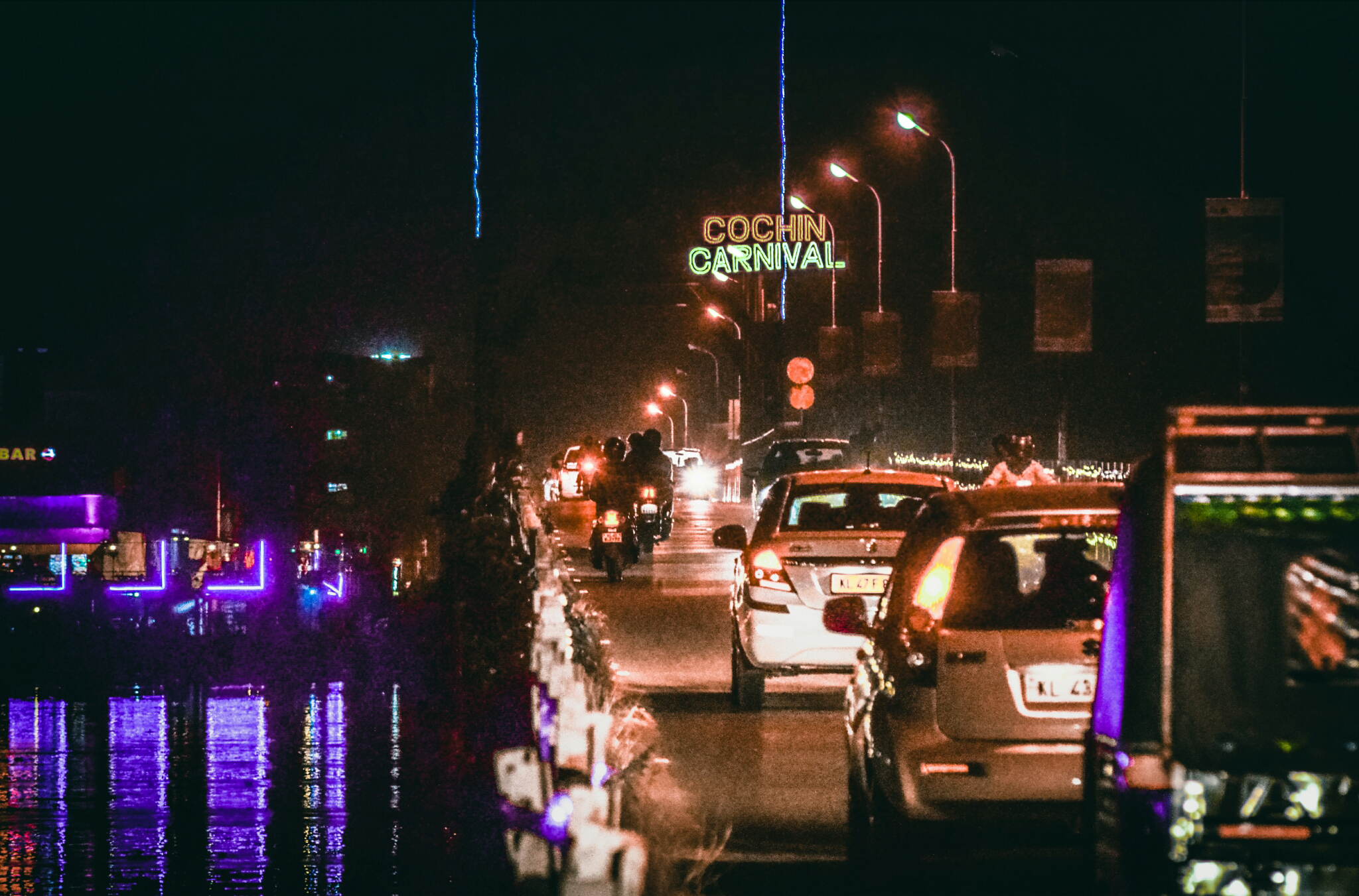
- Welcome sign to the event at Harbour Bridge
- Dates: 23 December to 1 January
- Frequency: Annually
- Locations: Fort Kochi, Kerala, India
- Years active: 1984–present

Cochin Carnival is an entertainment event held every year in the last week of December at Fort Kochi in the city of Kochi, Kerala. This event is held mostly during the last two weeks of December and finally ends on 1 January. It is officially inaugurated with hoisting the Flag of India at the Vasco da Gama Square.

The main highlight of the carnival is the massive procession on the New Year's Day, led by elephants in ornamental trappings. North Indian dances are a part of the procession. It is a combination of different cultures like Portuguese, Gujarati, Punjabi, Malayalee, Kannada, Arab, Dutch, and Anglo Indian culture.

Many competitions like beach bike race, beach football, wrestling, boxing, cycle race, bullet race, kayaking, swimming and marathon races are held. Art shows, food festivals, colourful rallies and fairs add to the festive spirit of the carnival. The main principles promoted during the festival are Participation, Peace, Progress, Adventure and Environment. The city is decorated with white paper buntings, especially the Kochi Fort. The white colour is dominant in all decorations which symbolizes peace and tranquillity.

Kochi Fort is the center of all the activities that take place at the time of the Cochin Carnival. It is promoted by the district tourism promotion council.

== History ==
In 1984, three youngsters from Kochi - Ananda Felix Scaria (Ananda Surya), George Augustine Thundiparambil (Roy) and Antony Anup Scaria (Anoop) decided to organise a beach festival with a programme at the Fort Kochi beach to celebrate the signing of a UN proclamation mandating 1985 as the International Youth Year. They were supported by 150 youth groups of various clubs and organizations. Some of the other names associated with the first Carnival are Nirmal John Augustine, Radha Gomathi and Abul Kalam Azad (photographer), who later became an active member of the team and has many images from the first carnival, that are being archived by Ekalokam Trust for Photography.

This program started during the second week of December 1984 with a cycle race followed by other local ethnic games like kabaddi, tug of war, kalari, kuttiyum kolum, Kalam Vara (floor drawing) etc. The event ended on 1 January 1985 with a procession with a massive rally including caparisoned elephants accompanied by Panchavadyam, called ‘Carnivale Cochin’. Gradually, it took the form of what is today called the Cochin Carnival.

In Popular Culture

Movie featuring Cochin Carnival

RDX: Robert Dony Xavier, Chotta Mumbai

== Highlights ==
=== Papanhi ===
Papanhi is a giant statue of an old man. Papanhi is burned exactly at stroke of midnight signifies the end of a passing year and welcome New Year. This symbolises the burning of all the ills and beginning on a new note. This is followed by gala party with dance and music till morning. The origin of this custom remains ambiguous.

Before this became a part of the Carnival, the local clubs had Papanhi festivities all over the area. It merged with the carnival and the legend too grew. The papanhi resembles Santa Claus. Over a period of time, the effigy of Santa started being burnt, however, was rectified afterwards.

== In popular culture ==
Cochin Carnival is the main part of the plot especially pappanji is referred in climax of 2007 Malayalam film Chotta Mumbai and Cochin Carnival is also featured in 2023 Malayalam movie RDX: Robert Dony Xavier

== See also ==
- Fort Kochi
- Culture of Kochi
- India International Boat show
- Kochi-Muziris Biennale
