= Pappanji =

Effigy made as part of new year celebrations at Kochi, Kerala

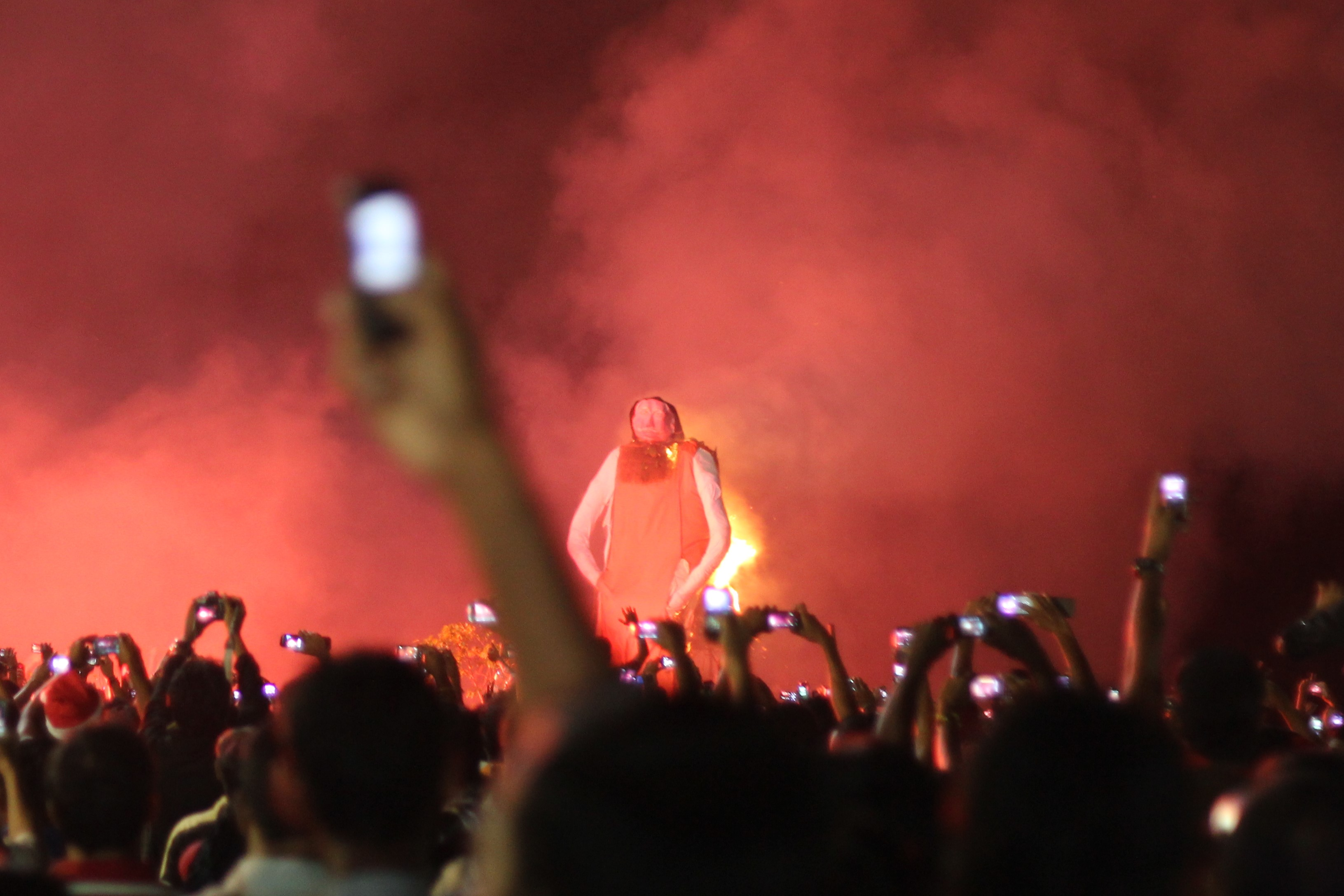
- Pappanji burning in 2011

Creature information
- Other name(s): Papanji, Papanhi

Origin
- Country: India
- Region: Fort Kochi, Cochin,Ernakulam district,Kerala

Pappanji (IPA: [pɐpːaːɲːi], also spelled as Pappaanji, Papanji or Papanhi) is an effigy of a European old man, prepared as part of the New Year celebrations in Fort Kochi, Cochin. It is prepared in the form of a European old man as a symbol of the passing year. With Pappanji being burned at midnight on the last day of December, the concept is that the year is over. It is thought to have originated from the remnants of the Christmas and New Year celebrations of the Portuguese.

In many parts of Kerala, Santa Claus is sometimes referred locally as Christmas Pappanji. But the carnival's organizers disassociate Pappanji with Santa Claus.

== Origin ==
Some historians says that the Pappanji burning ceremony in Kochi is thought to have originated from the remnants of the Christmas and New Year celebrations of the Portuguese who ruled Fort Kochi region from 1503 to 1663. With the permission of the then Cochin king, they built a fort called Fort Emmanuel, which is thought to be the first European fort in India and established a small city called Santa Cruz around the fort. Churches and other institutions were also built there. As Catholics, they celebrated Christmas and New Year magnificently. The Pappanji burning is believed to have originated from the remnants of this culture.

Some other believes that the myth of Pappanji was originated from the Jewish culture of the coast of Kerala, which has a history of over two thousand years. The historic Paradesi Synagogue at Mattancherry, near Fort Kochi, records the arrival of Jewish settlers in 70 AD. On the eighth day of the Feast of Enoch, which commemorates the defeat of the Greek army and the recapture of their land, the effigy of the Greek general Bagris is burned after Torah reading. Straw and dry grass are used for making the effigy. Salt and green leaves are inserted into it to create a small crack while burning. It is believed that the burning of Pappanji in Kochi may have been borrowed from the ritual of burning the Bagris. The Pappanji burning ceremony takes place on the eighth day after Christmas Eve, similar to the festival of Enoch.

== Concept ==
At midnight on 31 December, the New Year is celebrated by lighting the Pappanji, the symbol of the passing year. The concept is to burn that year and hopefully move on to the new year.

== Celebration ==
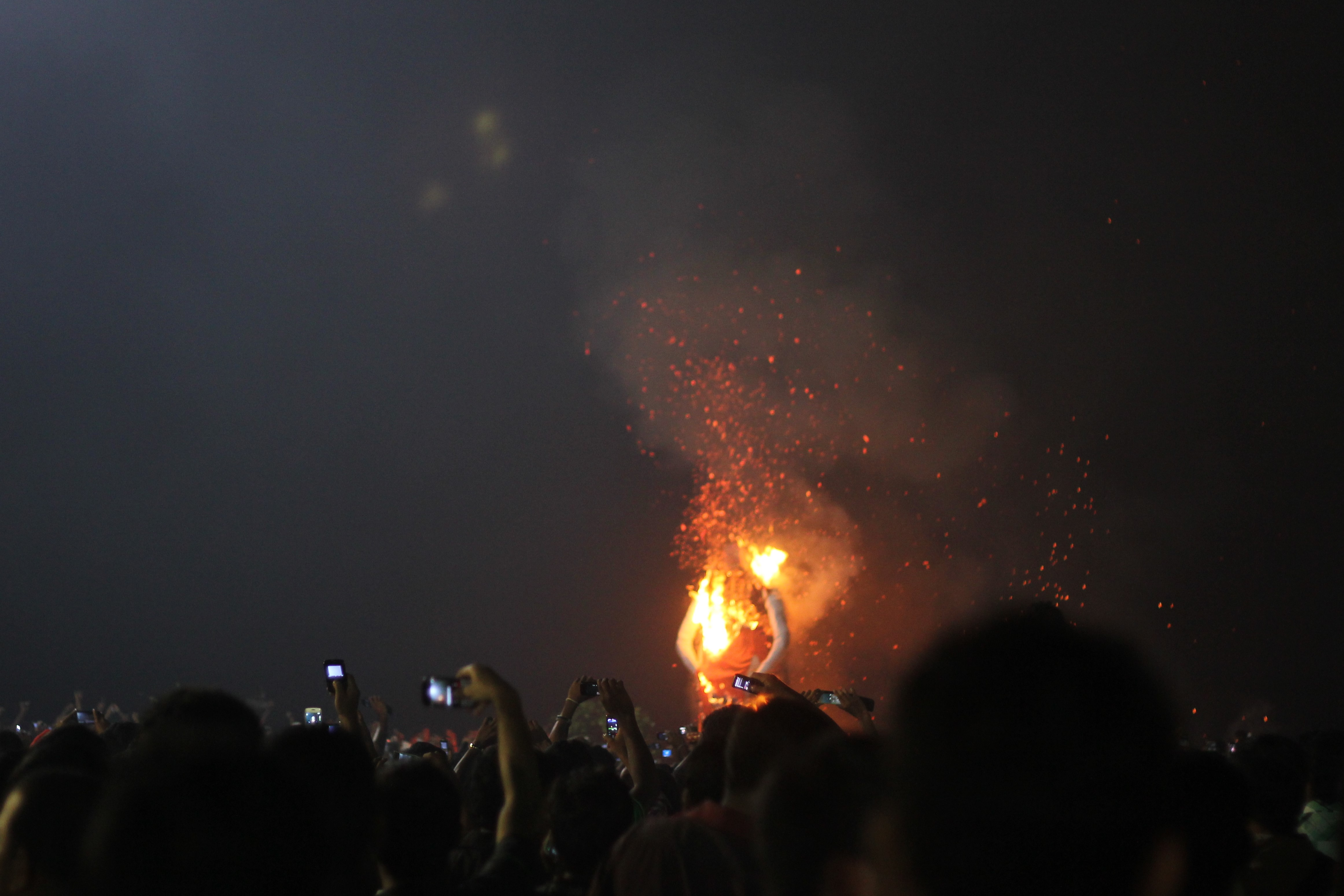
Pappanji burning, Fort Kochi in 2011

The tradition of making and burning Pappanji has been around in Kochi since long. In the early days, during Christmas-new year days, it was common for children to make small Pappanjis along the way. Wearing a coat, suit, hat and shoes, Pappanji looked like an old European man smoking a cigar. There were hundreds of such Pappanjis can be seen in the streets of Fort Kochi, all made with old clothes filled with straw. But later the number decreased, and then for a while people prepared Pappanji in the shape of Santa Claus too. However, the Pappanji later regained its old form.

With the adoption of the Pappanji burning ritual by the Cochin Carnival, it became a widespread celebration. As part of the carnival, a huge effigy of Pappanji is made, and burned at the Fort Kochi Beach. The Cochin Carnival was started in 1985 by a group of young people in Kochi following the Beach Fest held as part of the United Nations 'Youth Year' celebrations. It has roots of Portuguese catholic culture.

With the launch of the Kochi-Muziris Biennale in 2012, the production of Pappanji was spearheaded by the Kochi Biennale Foundation. Since then, Pappanji has been prepared by some of the best artists in Kerala. The Pappanji burning ceremony attracts thousands of tourists, including foreigners to Kochi during New Year's Eve. The traditional burning of Papanji drew criticism when several people, including women, were injured in a stampede, in 2023. Following this, to control the crowd, the authorities are mulling to hold the burning of Papanji, which attracts thousands to Fort Kochi, at multiple beaches in Ernakulam, including Vypin, Kuzhupilly and Cherai.

== See also ==
- Culture of Kochi
- Burning of Judas
- Zozobra
