= ETP =

ETP may refer to:

- Eastern Treatment Plant, in Melbourne, Australia
- Economic Transformation Programme, in Malaysia
- Effluent treatment plant
- Ekalokam Trust for Photography, in Tamil Nadu, India
- Electrolytic tough-pitch, a type of oxygen-free copper
- Electronics Training Program of the United States Navy
- Employment termination payment
- Energy Technology Perspectives, an annual report series of the International Energy Agency
- Endogenous thrombin potential
- Energy Transfer Partners, an American natural gas and propane company
- Entertainment Technology Partners, an American entertainment technology company
- Entrepreneurship Theory and Practice, a scholarly journal
- Ethical Tea Partnership
- Ethylene to propylene
- European Technology Platform
- European training programs
- Exchange-traded product
