= Culture of Kochi =

Culture of the Indian city

Kochi, is a city and port in the Indian state of Kerala.

The culture of the city can be termed as predominantly South Indian. Residents of Kochi are known as Kochiites; they are an important part of the South Indian weltanschauung. Being the largest city in Kerala, the culture of Kochi is significantly more cosmopolitan than the rest of the state. The city is cosmopolitan in many ways, due to its exposure to foreign tourists.

== Historical influences ==
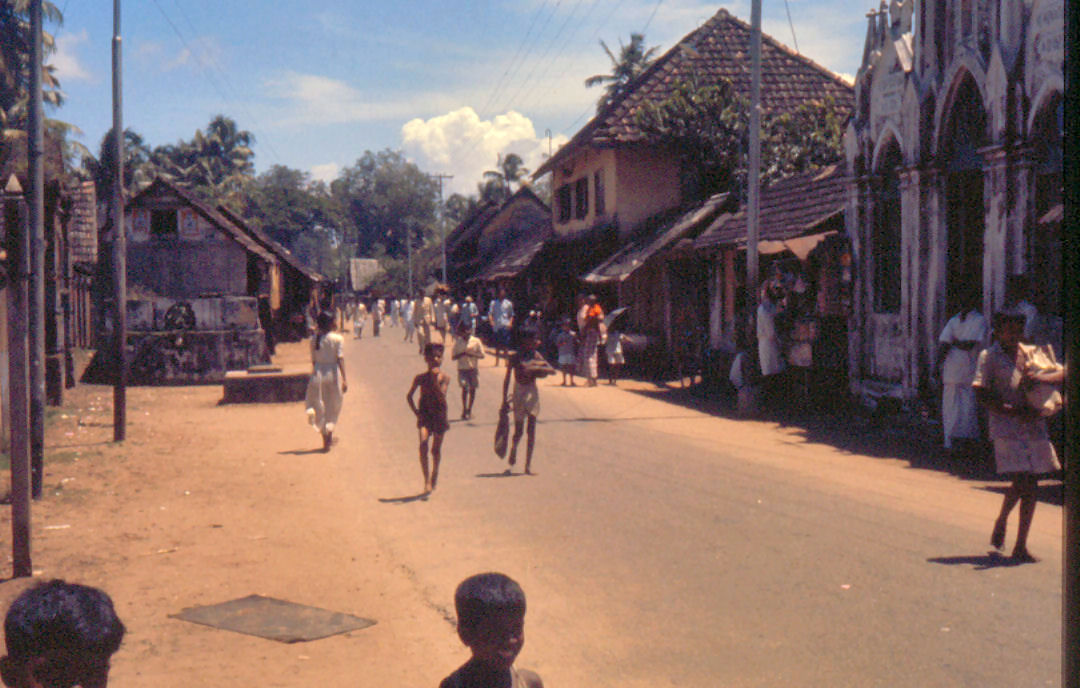
A street in Kochi circa 1960

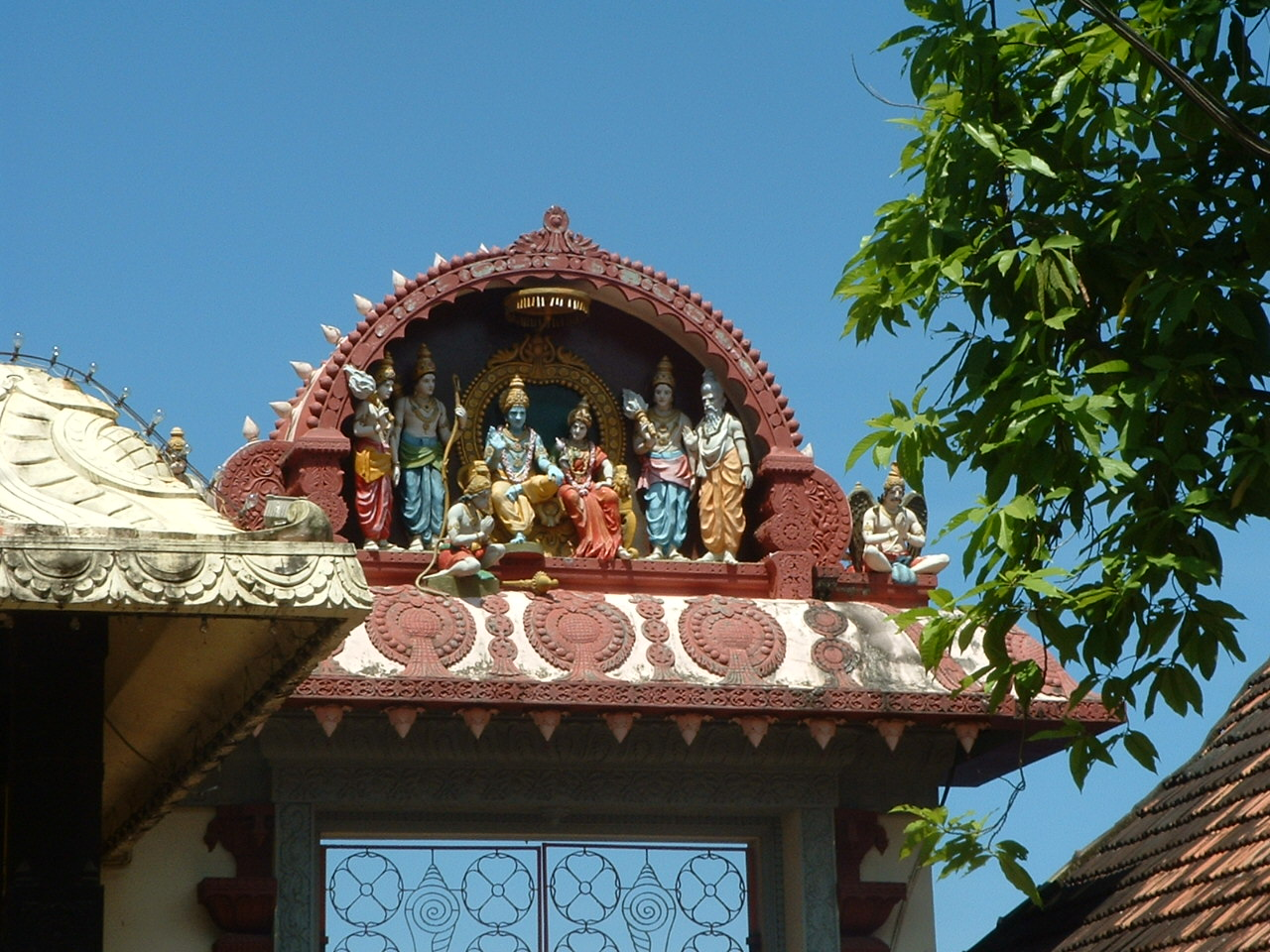
The gopuram of a Hindu temple in Kochi

Kochi's culture was enriched by successive waves of migration over the course of several millennia. The city once had a large Jewish community that figured prominently in Kochi's business and economic strata. Known as the Malabar Yehuden—and now increasingly as Cochin Jews—the community has now almost entirely migrated to Israel and the United States. Also, Kochi is the economic and financial capital of the state and is slowly turning into one of the commercial cities of India. Saint Thomas Christianity was the sole Christian tradition in Kochi for a long time. However, the Portuguese arrival in the 16th century, led to Roman Catholicism being a dominant force.

== Contemporary culture ==
Kochi has a diverse, multicultural, and secular community consisting of Hindus, Christians, Jews, Muslims, Jains, Sikhs, Konkanis and Buddhists, among other denominations. Today, the population of the city is a mix of people from all parts of Kerala and most of India. The city's pan-Indian nature is highlighted by the substantial presence of various ethnic communities from different parts of the country. The presence of the headquarters of the Southern Naval Command adds to the cosmopolitan nature of the city.

The people are also increasingly fashion-conscious, often deviating from the traditional Kerala wear to Western casual clothing. Kochi has also played host to a number of high-profile fashion shows, including ones sponsored by FashionTV.

Kochi is also the venue of the annual Cochin Flower Show

== Cuisine ==
Kochiites generally partake of Keralite cuisine, which is generally characterised by an abundance of coconut and spices. Other South Indian cuisines and Chinese cuisine are popular. Fast food culture is very prominent; a large number of fast food outlets include those operated by multinational conglomerates like Pizza Hut, Marrybrown, KFC, McDonald's, Chic King, and Dominos. North Indian and Continental cuisines are becoming increasingly popular.

== Festivals ==
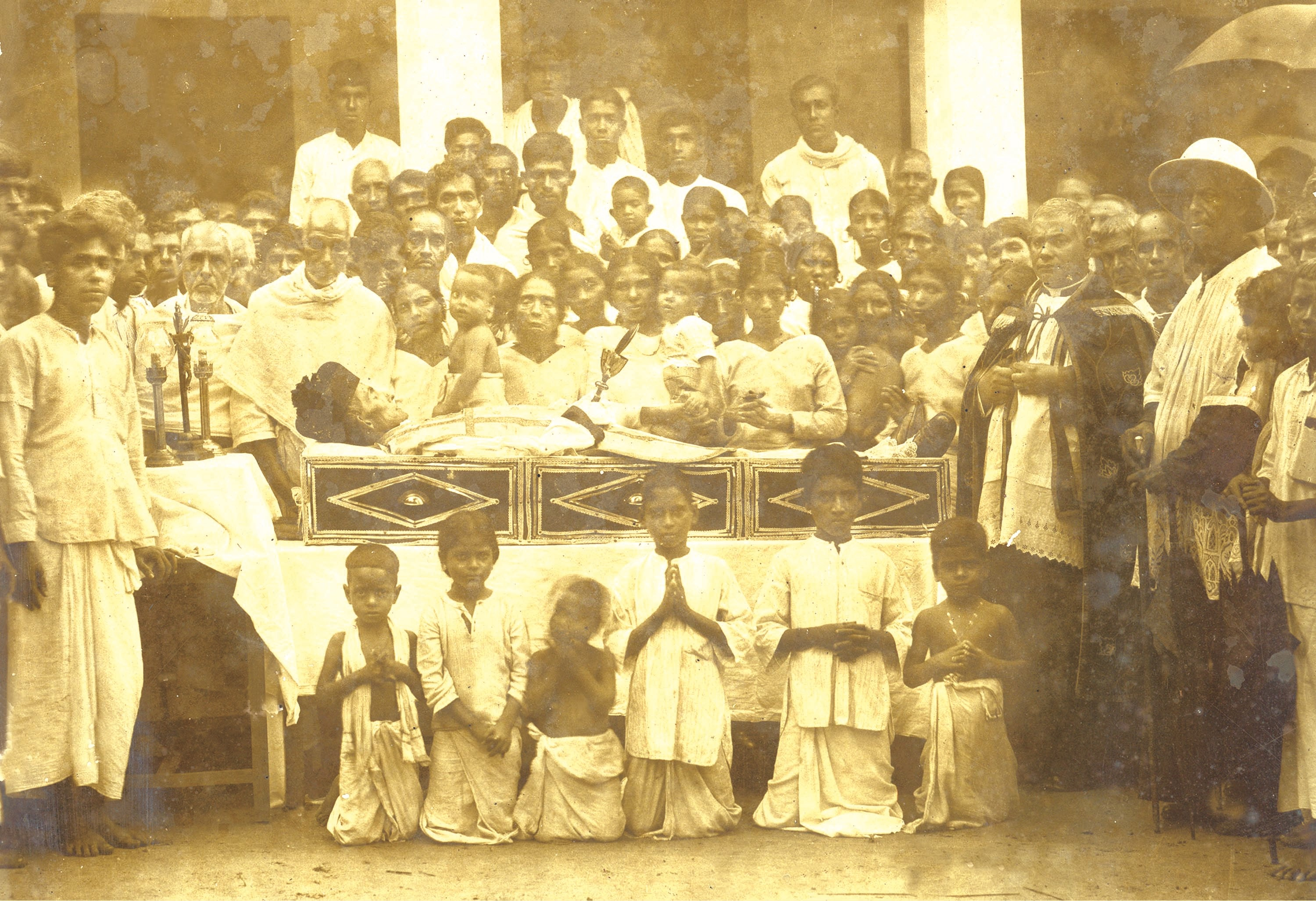
Funeral of Venerable Varghese Payyappilly in Thevara on 6 October 1929

Keeping up with its multi-ethnic diaspora, Kochi celebrates traditional Kerala festivals like Onam and Vishu along with North Indian festivals like Holi and Diwali with great fervour. Christian and Islamic festivals like Christmas, Easter, Eid ul-Fitr, Milad-e-sherif, etc. are also celebrated. A merry making feast called the Cochin Carnival is celebrated at Fort Kochi every year during the last ten days of December. Various unique games, dirt bike races, beach volleyball and fireworks display are held as part of the festivities. The carnival is celebrated as a continuity of the Portuguese New Year revelry held here during the colonial days.

Kochi is also the permanent venue of the India International Boat show, the India International Aqua show and the Kochi International Book Festival.

== Cinema, arts and literature ==
Kochi was home to some of the most influential figures in Malayalam literature, including Changampuzha Krishna Pillai, Kesari Balakrishna Pillai, G. Sankara Kurup, and Vyloppilli Sreedhara Menon. Changampuzha is popular for his bestseller, Ramanan, written in the romantic tradition.

Kochi is one of the nerve centres of Mollywood in the state. The scenic beauty, especially the Anglican appearance of places like Fort Kochi, makes it an important location for movie screening. There are over 20 cinema halls which screen movies in Malayalam, Tamil, English and Hindi. The Cochin International Film Festival (CIFF) is held in the city every year.

The Durbar Hall Ground in the city plays host to numerous cultural events that happen in the city. The Changampuzha Park in the suburbs of the city is also a popular venue for various cultural activities and performances.

Recently Oberon Mall was inaugurated in Kochi at Edappally NH bypass road, which happens to be the second mall after the Bay Pride Mall at Marine Drive. Lulu International Shopping Mall, Kochi one of the biggest malls in India, is also in Kochi.

== Sports and stadiums ==
Cricket and football are the most popular sports in the city. The Jawaharlal Nehru International Stadium in Kochi is one of the largest multi-use stadiums in India. The stadium is the home ground of the F C Cochin football club. It has a seating capacity of 60,000 and is equipped with floodlights for night play. The Regional Sports Centre is an important centre of sporting activity in the city. The centre has an indoor stadium and is equipped with facilities for sports like tennis, badminton, basketball, cricket, roller skating and table tennis.

Other important stadiums include the B.R.Ambedkar Stadium, the Palace Oval Ground and the Maharajas College Grounds, where hockey and tennis are played.

== Other prominent people ==
- K. J. Yesudas - singer.
- Abraham Barak Salem, Jewish Gandhi
- Sahodaran Ayyappan, social reformer
- Pandit Karuppan, social reformer
- Sreeshanth, international cricketer
- Asin, model and actor
- Revathi, actor.
- Cochin Haneefa, actor
- Anand Jon, fashion designer.
- Augustine Joseph, Singer
- Varghese Payyappilly Palakkappilly, Syro-Malabar saint
- Panampilly Govinda Menon, former Kerala Chief Minister
