= Kurian Peter =

The Right Reverend Kurian Peter
- Bishop of Cochin Diocese
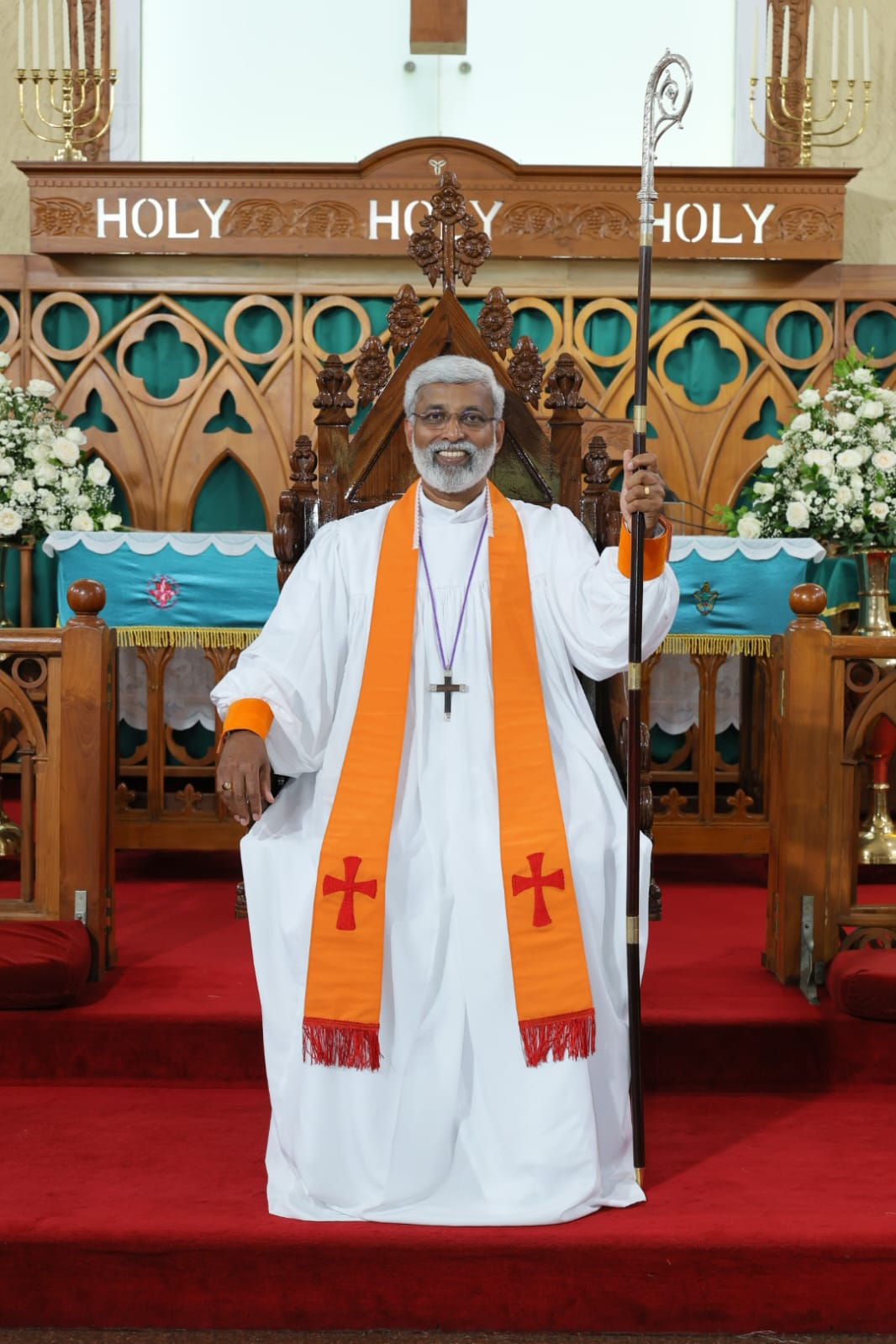
- Church: Church of South India
- Diocese: Cochin
- In office: Since 2025
- Predecessor: Baker Ninan Fenn

Orders
- Ordination: 9 May 1999 (diaconate); 25 March 2000 (priesthood) by J. W. Gladstone (diaconate); George Isaac (bishop); George Isaac (priesthood)
- Consecration: 15 August 2025 by K. Reuben Mark

Personal details
- Born: December 5, 1971 (age 54)
- Spouse: Smitha Mary Mathew
- Children: 2

Kurian Peter (born 5 December 1971) is an Indian bishop of the Church of South India. Since 2025 he has been bishop of the Diocese of Cochin.

== Early life and education ==
Kurian Peter was born on 5 December 1971 to K.J.Peter and Aleyamma Peter of a Saint Thomas Anglicans family of Kochuparambil. He earned a Bachelor of Arts in Economics from Mahatma Gandhi University between 1990 and 1993. He then studied for a Bachelor of Divinity at Leonard Theological College, Jabalpur. From 2019 to 2022, he pursued a Master of Theology in Pastoral Care at Trinity College, University of Divinity, Melbourne.

== Ordained ministry ==
Peter was ordained a deacon on 9 May 1999 and a presbyter on 25 March 2000. Over the following years he served parishes in Kerala and Melbourne, including St. Francis Church, Kochi. He also held roles as Administrative Finance Secretary of the diocese, Director of Christian Education, Director of Counseling Centers, and Director of Child Development Centers.

== Episcopate ==
Peter was consecrated as the Bishop of Cochin Diocese on 15 August 2025 at Immanuel CSI Cathedral, Kochi. The service was led by Most Rev. K. Reuben Mark, Moderator of the CSI.
