= Abul Kalam Azad (photographer) =

Indian photographer

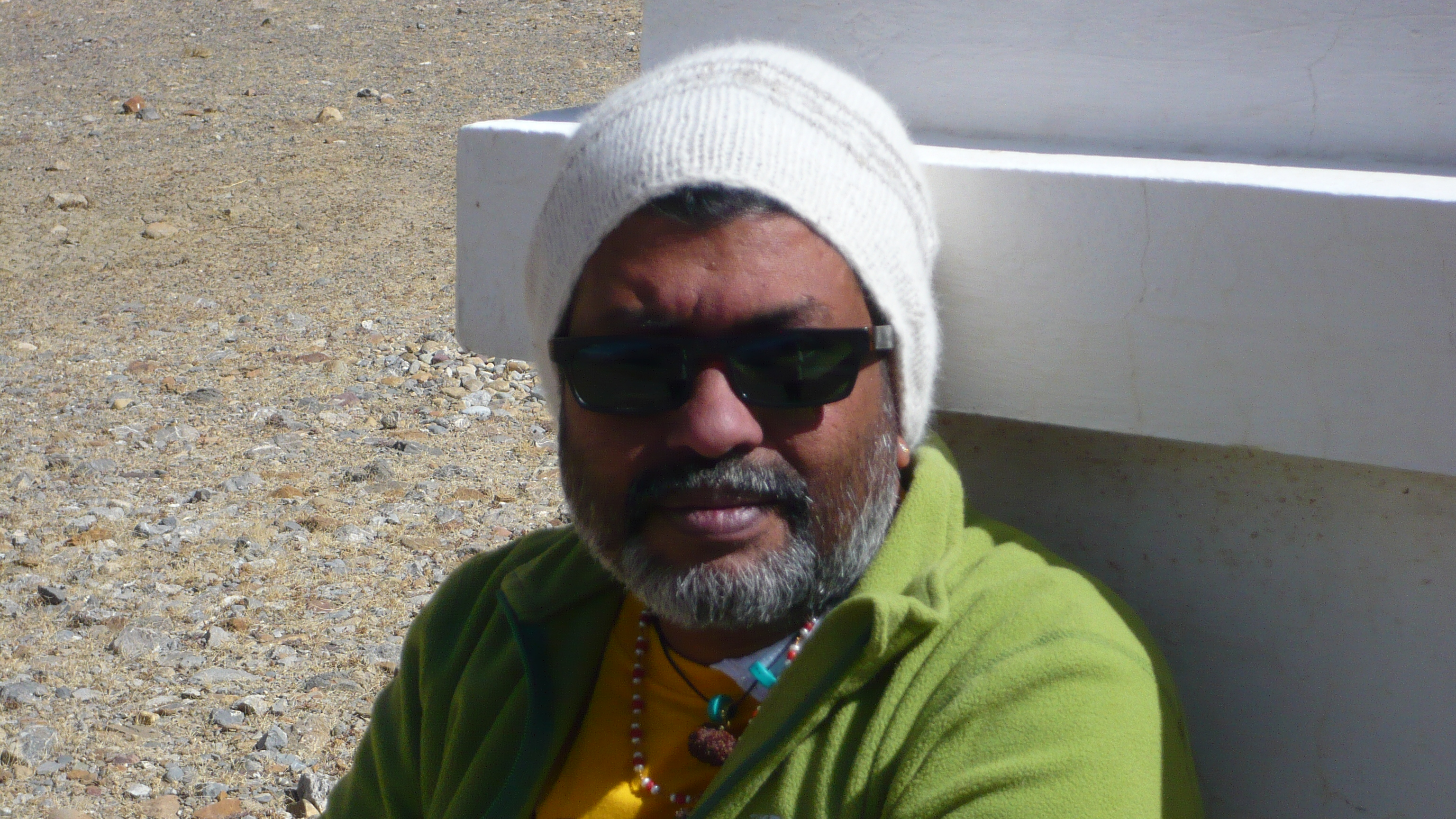
- Azad in Casa, Himalayas, 2012
- Born: 24 September 1964 (age 62); Kerala, India
- Occupation: Photographer

Abul Kalam Azad (born 24 September 1964) is a noted contemporary Indian photographer. Abul's photographic works are predominantly autobiographical and expose the areas of politics, culture, contemporary history, gender and eroticism. His works attempts a re-reading of contemporary Indian history – the history in which ordinary people are absent and mainly provided by beautiful images and icons. Abul's works makes an active intervention in the common illustrative discourse of this history. Using the same tool, photography, that chisels history out of a block of ‘real’ human experiences, Abul makes a parody of it. 'Overall, the corpus of Azad's work can be seen to have a thrust towards an archive of local micro-history at the level of personal memory and in that sense, his works add up to a kind of social anthropology of his land and its people, though not necessarily in the line of tradition of the objective documentary'. Abul Kalam Azad is the visionary behind EtP Ekalokam Trust for Photography, a Trust dedicated to preserving and promoting contemporary Photography. He is also the Director of Project 365, a public photo art project that collectively creates and preserves photographic visuals of the fast changing culture and lifestyle of ancient Tamilakam. He is the Editor-in-Chief of Photo Mail online magazine.

== Biography ==
Abul was born in Kerala (24 September 1964) to a migrant family from Tamil Nadu and was brought up in Mattancherry, the historical heart of Kochi. Abul's talents as a photographer was evident from childhood and he joined as an apprentice in a hometown studio to develop his skills. During the 1980s he set up 'Zen studio' at Mattancherry and started working with many prominent news agencies, newspapers, and in periodicals in India and Abroad. He moved to Delhi in the year 1990 and worked as a photo-journalist with Press Trust of India (1990–1996), New Delhi Bureau. During this time he traveled for further studies to Europe. He was supported by various scholarships, one of which was granted to him by the French Government. He also received a Charles Wallace Award (fellowship 1995), UK. He left the promising photo-journalist career to follow his passion 'art photography'. His first exhibition 'Frontier People' was held at Kerala Kaladeepam in the year 1994. His first National level exhibition 'Violence Undone' was held in Max Muller Bhavan, New Delhi in the year 1996. Since then, Abul's work has been exhibited widely in India and Abroad.

Coming back to his native Mattancherry in the year 2000, he set up Mattancherry's his studio 'Mayalokam' in the inspiring labyrinth of the ancient warehouses, between the Bazaar Road and the Harbour front. Soon, Mayalokam studio became a cultural hub for locals, national and international artists / enthusiasts from various discipline. Eventually, Mayalokam became Mayalokam Art Collective to include other artists – Emma Burke-gaffney, Gayatri Gamuz and Anand Felix Scaria. The collective space comprised Mayalokam studio, Lila gallery, Masala company design store and Badal, an alternate shop. Art Exhibitions and Free music (interactive music concert between locals and professional musicians) took place on a regular basis.

In the year 2001, 'Encounter', Kochi's first contemporary art festival, sort of precursor to the Kochi-Muziris Biennale was initiated by Mayalokam Art Collective and Kashi Art Cafe. The festival took place at Mayalokam Art collective and Kashi art cafe. Prominent artists and academicians like Ajayan Namboothri, Jose Manuel Val, Bawa Chelladurai, Suresh Jayaram, Vivek Vilasini, Dr. Rajan Gurukal took part in the fortnight long art festival which included film screenings, book reading sessions, plays, art exhibitions and seminars. Mayalokam Art collective was officially dissolved in the year 2005 and Abul's Mayalokam studio continued in the same building till 2010.

Abul Kalam Azad moved to Tiruvannamalai, Tamil Nadu in the year 2010. Here Abul Kalam Azad initiated the formation of Ekalokam Trust for Photography which was registered as a non-profit foundation in the year 2013, co-founded by Kulanthivel and Tulsi Swarna Lakshmi.

== Grants and scholarships ==
2017 & 2018 India Foundation for the Arts Grantee 2012 – 2014 Senior Fellowship, Ministry of Culture, Government of India 1995 Charles Wallace Award for Masters in the UK 1994 French Government Scholarship for higher studies in photography

== Early works (1980–1999) ==
Using the medium of Analog photography, Azad documents his personal and social life. His works could largely be associated with the place he lives, the social-political dynamics of the period, the technological advancement etc., and very much pertains to the local culture and historical context. Abul worked as Photo-journalist and editor in several magazines and news papers which is reflected in the works done during this period. He traveled for higher studies to Europe and London which has greatly influenced his works.

== Painted photographs (1992–2013) ==
Painted photography also referred to as Hand-colouring of photographs refers to manually adding colour to a black-and-white photograph print, generally either to heighten the realism of the photograph or for artistic purposes. Azad started experimenting different sorts of painted photographs starting early 1990s.

'Azad's early explorations included various mixtures of negative manipulation and hand-colouring and later digitally altering scans of already hand altered prints. Azad's hands on experiments were (and are) non-stop. The result has been a number of series each with its own particular approach and look.'

Painting and multi-media works on printed photographs is predominant in his early works. Doodling, scratching the negatives and the printed photographs, serigraph printing, stitching, beading and sequencing on the photographs are other styles used. Abul's exploration also included exposing two or three negatives at the same time, cutting and pasting different negatives to create a new image etc.,

'Abul draws on photographs. Engaging in the act of scratching and inscribing certain images- often symbols of violation like sword, torch, and other instruments of force. This process evokes a sense of witchcraft or ritualistic transformation.The violence is vigorous, and the outcome can be seen as a form resurrection. Through this, Abul's two- dimensional works enter directly into the discourse of contemporary social life. He negates the negation, and violates the violation, creating works that oscillate between the social dialectics; creation and destruction, spiritualism and fundamentalism, pacifism and fascism.'

== Popular works ==
=== Divine Façade ===
Abul Kalam Azad's series Divine Façade (1990–1995) has been widely discussed and exhibited internationally. The history of human civilization could be seen as the shift of human beings from their nomadic uncertainty to a settled fixity. But that was not the end. For them, invading other territories and building up architectural structures, to live and rule, were as important as making settlements in their own territory. In this sense, architectures all over the world give evidence to the growth of civilization, are symbols of invasion, seats of power and negotiating points in the exchange of power. What becomes minimal in the comparison with the overpowering architectures is the mass of human beings, who always remains powerless. Ordinary people are apparently absent from this history. Abul's works attempts at a re-reading of this history.

'In the 1990s, Abul traveled extensively throughout North India, and documented the aftermath of the post-emergency India – the quest of the haunted sphinx of history at the foreground of a degenerating architecture of faith. This is evident in this set of work that deals with the violent message of an unending search for identity. In the context of the demolition of Babri Masjid, these images represent human resistance. He represents human presence before history... the humblest people with no air of power around them. The portraits’ cut and closed up textures of life become biographical with the manual scribbling, thus making a statement on the individual history of the ‘ant hill’—‘people of a nation’.

=== Black Mother – 'Heroine of Silapathikaram' ===
Black Mother – 'Heroine of Silappathikaram' done during the period from 2000 to 2003, on his return to Kerala after a stay outside, depicts the female oracles at the time of the festival at the Devi temple at Kodungalloor which is related according to local legends to the myth of Kannaki. Silappatikaram is one of the five Great Epics. The Jain poet prince Ilango Adigal of the 2nd century AD/CE is credited with this work. Kannaki, a legendary Tamil woman, is the central character of this epic. The story relates how Kannaki took revenge on the early Pandyan King of Madurai, for a mistaken death penalty imposed on her husband Kovalan, by cursing the city with disaster. Black Mother series reveal the inherent drama of this frozen movement – the supreme Goddess and her worshipers in a trance. The biological ancientness boils into the blackness of the photographs, exploring the utmost human possibility of the medium of Photography.

Noted art historian Prof. R. Nandakumar, HoD Visual arts, IGNCA says, 'these oracles in the various stages of trance, can be seen stomping around, sword in hand, in convulsive movements of frenzy. Weird-looking in their hysteric outbursts, the women oracles are part of the temple functionaries who devote themselves at the service of these unique customs and rituals observed in the temple that are related to ancient and possibly, pre-Brahminic mother goddess cults. Though the atmosphere is charged and overwrought with a kind of high-strung atavistic fervour, the images of these women in their redemptive bodily movements of self-mortification, have hardly any religious awe about them'.

=== Untouchables ===
Untouchables is Abul Kalam Azad's another popular series done during the period 2000–2006. The images are based on autobiographical reality and an understanding of everyday life. The Pop Art language is used to create a retro effect. The symbols are all gathered from memories and social experiences – it is a re-looking, and is a redoing the readily existing images. Some of them are local imageries and others are derived from Azad's family albums consisting of sepia-tinted photographs and are reworked digitally. While talking about his 'Untouchables' series, Abul says,'All the images of Untouchables series are based on poets, litterateurs, politicians and objects. It is an ode to eminent people like Gandhiji, Nataraja Guru, M. G. Ramachandran, Kumaran Asan, P. Krishna Pillai, my mother ... who have left an indelible stamp on the social, cultural and political sphere. They are "Untouchables" in the context of their stature, their achievements, and so these documents hold timeless images dressed in modern metaphor'.

'Carefully chosen the tell-tale images of times gone by, of memories that rankle and rant, of disappeared loves, of homes that once held sway, of men that mattered, of women who ruled, of hearths and hearts, of ideologies, of blood, sweat and tears and of emotions that have never let go of the artist the `Untouchables' is a veritable emotional journey. A journey that troubles just as it tells the lives and times of India, of Kerala and of closer home, Mattancherry', says Priyadarsshini Sharma in The Hindu.

== Recent works (2010–2013) ==
Abul now uses minimal equipments including film cameras, lomography, and a plastic pin hole camera.

== Historians and critics ==
Abul's work has been widely discussed and critiqued. 'Azad has several firsts to his credit. From a minority community, he articulated the issues related to minority communities as well as those of ‘minoritism’ as an ideological position. But he never fell into the traps of minority culture', Johny ML, Art historian and critic.

Ram Rahman well known photographer, designer and curator says, 'Azad shoots like a maniac – his frantic camera is an extension of an eye driven by a fevered mind. That fevered mind is a perfect reflection of our crazy culture – everything is worthy of being seen. The personal is political – the political is personal – that adage only applies to a part of his work. Left politics seen from the inside, religious ritual as street-side happening, blatant sexuality and marginalized sexual desire, drugged and drunken excess, the glories of classical music and dance, quotidian little details – his images teem with a life which cannot be contained'.

== Exhibitions ==
Abul's first exhibition was in Kalapeedom, Kochi and since then has exhibited his works in India and Abroad.

- 1994 Frontier People – Kerala Kalapeedom, Ernakulam
- 1995 Cine cést ne' – Gallery Nicephore, France
- 1995 Addressing Gandhi – New Delhi, Bombay, Madras, Calcutta
- 1996 Violence Undone – Max Mueller Bhavan, New Delhi
- 1997 Gift for India – New Delhi, Bombay, Madras, Calcutta
- 1997 Indien – Aspekte moderner Kunst, GTZ Gallery, Frankfurt
- 1997 Divine Façades – Photographers Gallery, Edinburgh
- 1997 Divine Façades – Pitshanger Museum, London
- 1997 Divine Façades – Impression Gallery, York
- 1998 Edge of the Century – Max Muller Bhavan, New Delhi
- 2001 Exhibition of Photography – Kashi Art Gallery
- 2002 Contemporary design and photography – Westferry Studio, London
- 2003 Goddesses – Lila Gallery, Mayalokam, Cochin
- 2003 Black Mother – Kashi Art Gallery, Cochin
- 2003 Remembering Bhupen – Kashi Art Gallery, Cochin
- 2003 Heat – Bose Pacia Modern, New York City
- 2005 Double Enders – Bombay, Delhi, Bangalore, Cochin
- 2006 Untouchables – RL Fine Art, New York
- 2006 Untouchables – Apparao Galleries, Madras, Delhi (preview at Kochi
- 2007 Making history our own – AIFACS, Delhi
- 2007 The whirlpool of fate – The visual art gallery, Habitat Centre, Delhi
- 2008 Crossovers & Overlaps – Apparao Galleries, Triveni Garden Theatre, New Delhi
- 2008 Animals – Ishka art Gallery, Cochin
- 2009 India Art Summit – New Delhi
- 2009 Arco Festival – Madrid, Spain
- 2010 Where three dreams cross – White Chapel Gallery London
- 2010 Where three dreams cross – Fotomuseum Winterthur, Switzerland
- 2011 Red room – Ragini art gallery, Delhi
- 2011 "Lens-ing it"- Ashna Gallery, Delhi
- 2011 ‘Photos of the gods’ LIFE IN ART, Switcherland
- 2012 Mind the gap, United Art Fair, New Delhi
- 2013 Focus Photography, Visual evidence
- 2013 HAIL show, MNF Museum, Cochin
- 2013 ‘Beatles in Rishikesh’ Apparao Galleries, New Delhi

== Documentary ==
A documentary about Abul Kalam Azad's works titled An Excavator of Images was released in 2018.

== Miniature art notebooks ==
150 images from various series of Abul Kalam Azad has been featured in the ten different notebooks published by Ekalokam Collective, in the year 2013. Ekalokam collective is a south Indian based firm (year of registration – 2012), working with the vision of reaching out to art lovers with their day to day use art products. Their motto is 'art in every day life'.

- Untouchables
- Periya Kovil
- Beatles in Rishikesh
- Etymology of Rishikesh
- Southern Salt
- My anger and other stories
- Coral Hills
- Samadhi
- The Dockland
- Chai, Charas and Chappathi
