= Church of Saint Francis, Kochi =

Saint Francis CSI Church, Fort Kochi
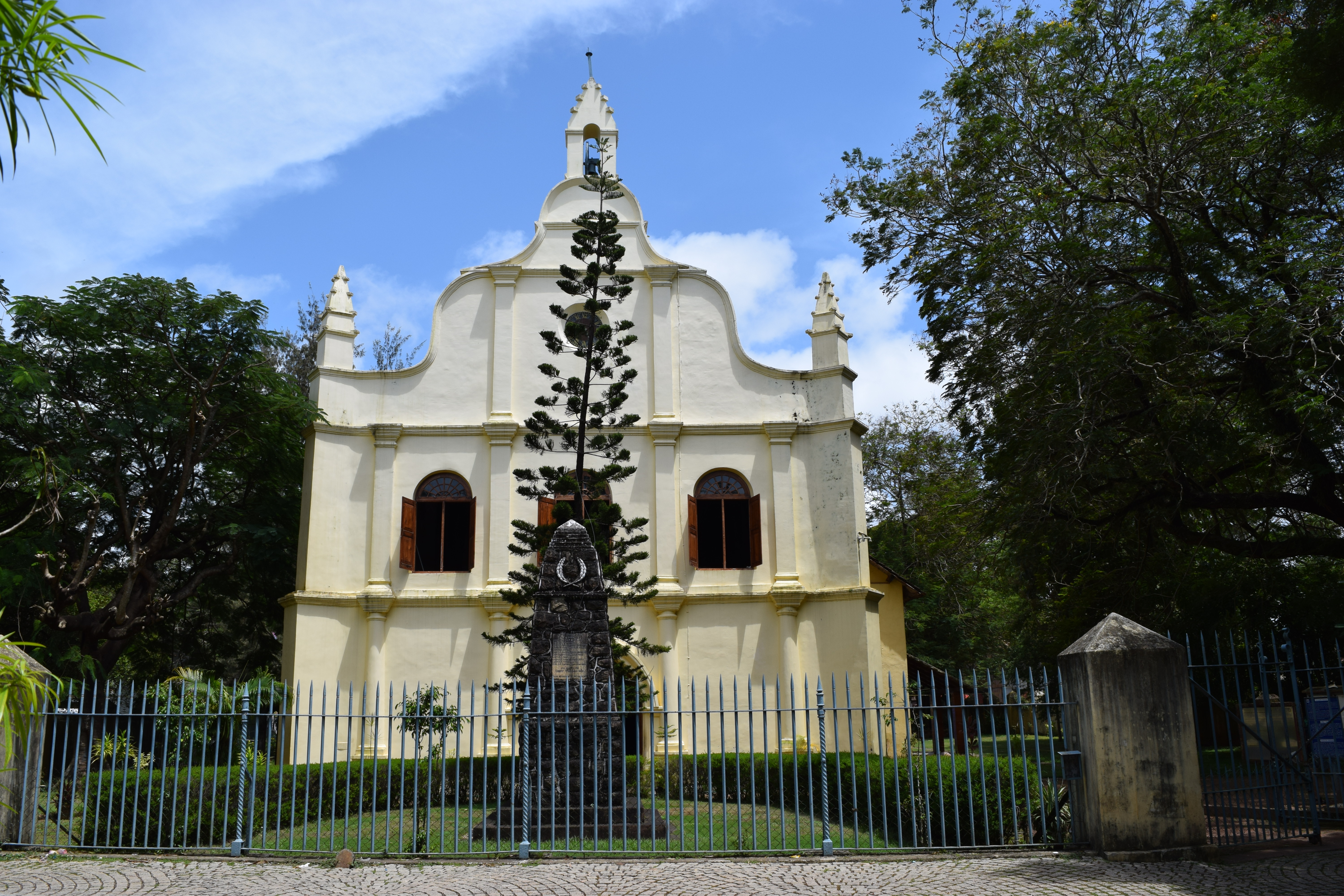
- Front side of the Church
- Saint Francis CSI Church, Fort Kochi
- 9°57′57″N 76°14′28″E
- Location: Kochi, Kerala
- Country: India
- Denomination: Church of South India

History
- Consecrated: 1506

Architecture
- Completed: 1516

Administration
- Diocese: Kochi Diocese

Saint Francis Church, in Fort Kochi, Kochi, originally built in 1503, is one of the oldest European churches in India and has historical significance as a witness to the European colonial ambitions in the subcontinent. The Portuguese explorer Vasco da Gama died in Kochi in 1524 when he was on his third visit to India. His body was originally buried in this church, but after fourteen years his remains were relocated to Lisbon and is now interred at Jerónimos Monastery.

== History ==
Vasco da Gama, who discovered the sea route from Europe to India, landed at Kappad near Kozhikode in 1498. He was followed by Pedro Álvares Cabral and Afonso de Albuquerque. They built Fort Emmanuel at the Fort Kochi Beach with permission from the Raja of Cochin. Within the fort, they built a church with a wooden structure, which was dedicated to St. Bartholomew. The neighbourhood is now known as Fort Kochi. Francisco de Almeida, the Portuguese viceroy, was allowed, in 1506, by the Raja of Cochin to reconstruct wooden buildings in stone and masonry.

The Portuguese explorer Vasco da Gama died in Kochi in 1524 on his third visit to India. His body was originally buried in this church, but after fourteen years his remains were moved to Lisbon.

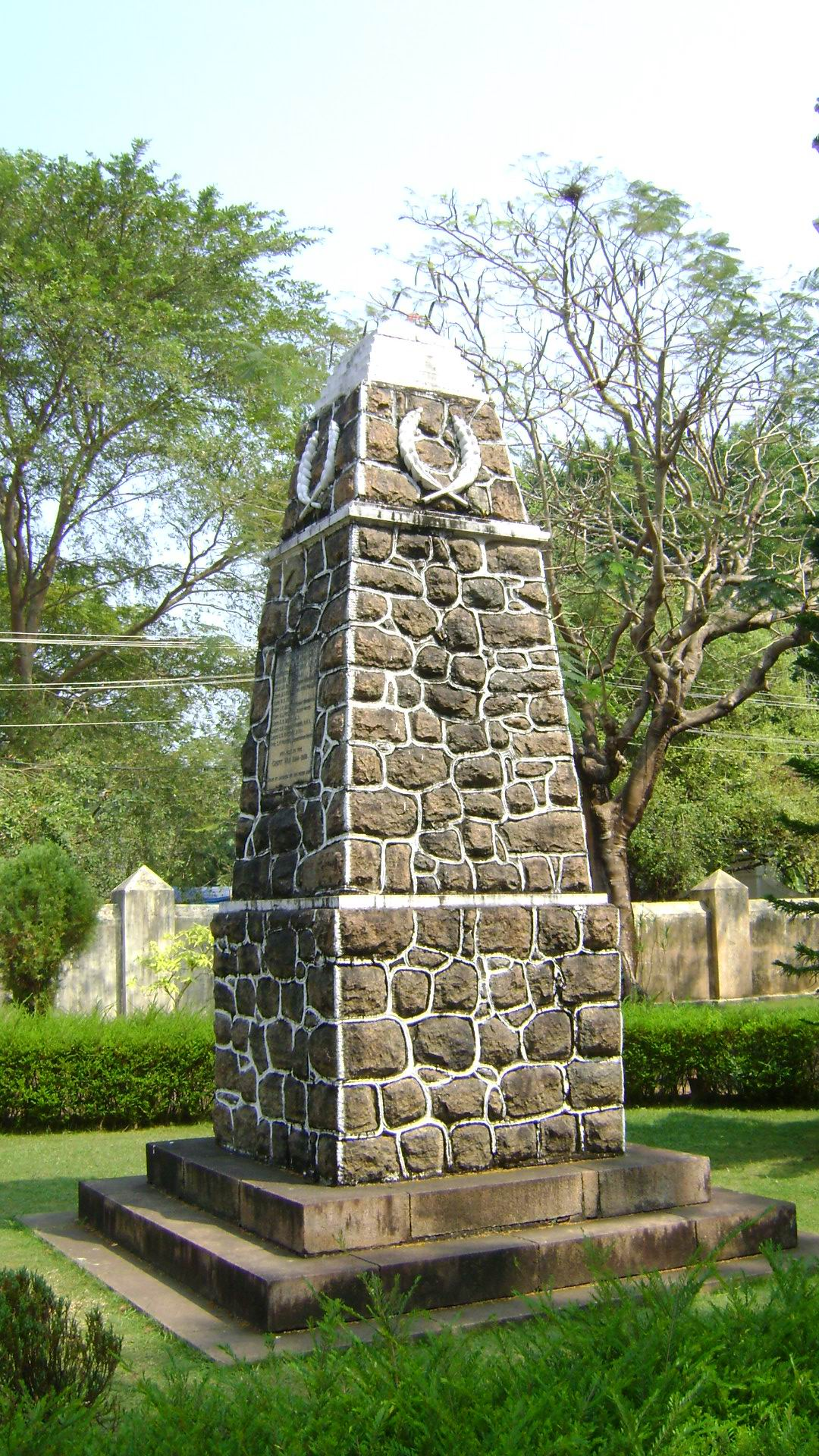
Towards the entrance in front of St Francis Church

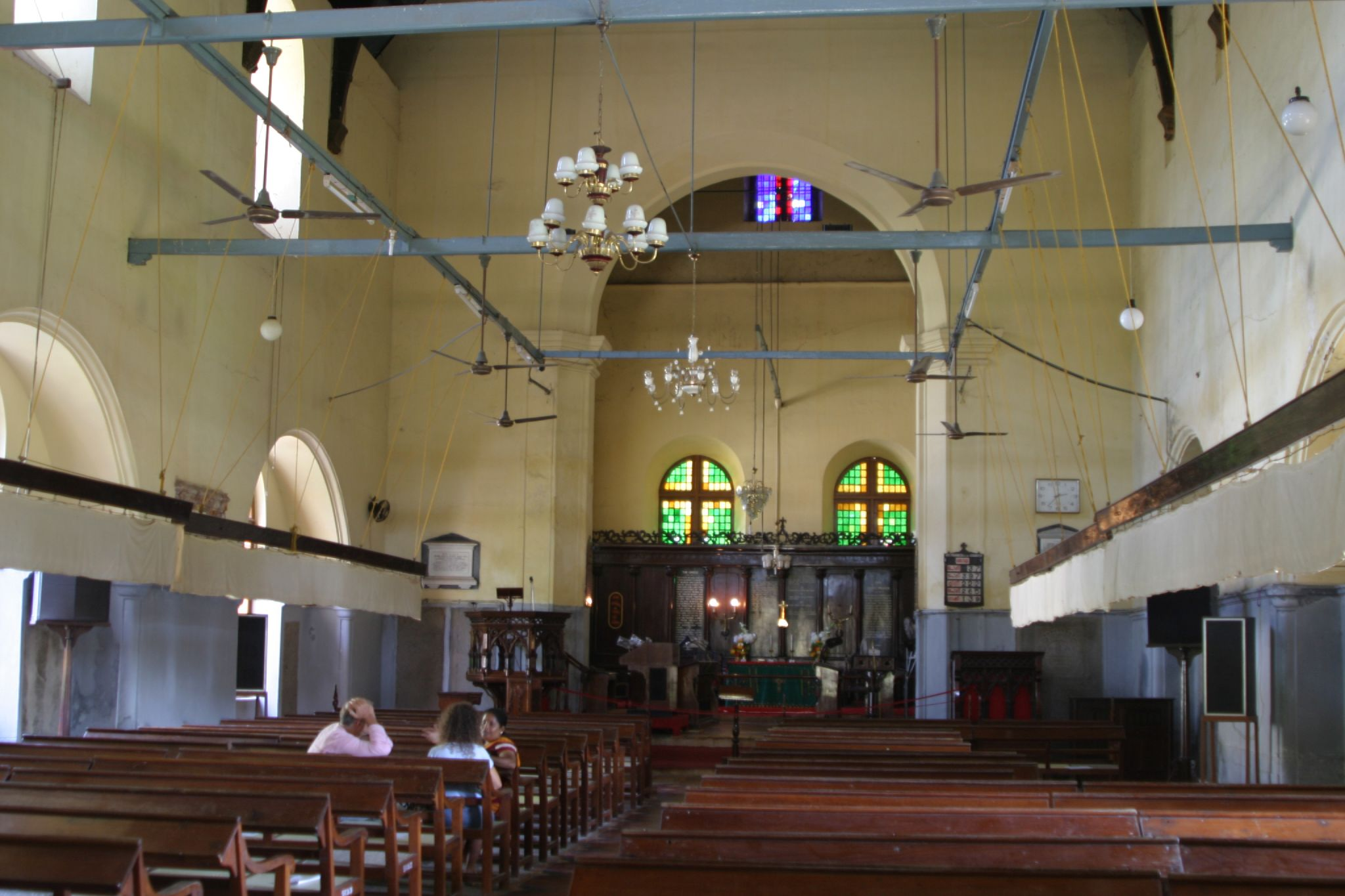
Interior view of the church

The Franciscans retained control over the church till the Dutch captured Kochi in 1663. While the Portuguese were Roman Catholics, and the Netherlands had Catholic and Protestant citizens, the Dutch government and Colonialists were Protestant. They demolished all the churches except this one. They reconditioned it and converted it into a government church.

== See also ==
- Christianity in India
- Church of South India
- Kochi Diocese of the Church of South India
