= Diocese of Cochin of the Church of South India =

Diocese of the Church of South India in Kerala, India

CSI Diocese of Cochin is one of the twenty four dioceses of the Church of South India (CSI) covering the churches in Ernakulam and Thrissur districts. The Church of South India is a United Protestant denomination.

== History ==
Cochin diocese was formed on 9 April 2015 after a special conference of the Church synod in Chennai. Cochin diocese has been carved out of erstwhile North Kerala Diocese and remaining portion was furnished into CSI Malabar diocese.

CSI Immanuel Cathedral, Broadway, Ernakulam serves as its cathedral and was promulgated by CSI Moderator Most Rev. Thomas . K. Oommen.

== Bishops of the Diocese ==
- Rt. Rev. Baker Ninan Fenn (2013 - 2024)
- Rt. Rev. Kurian Peter (2025 - Present)

== Extent, traditions and establishments ==
The Kochi diocese comprises Ernakulam and Thrissur districts, parts of Idukki and Palakkad districts and CSI Holy Trinity Church, Hinkal, Mysore.

Its tradition is mainly Anglican and episcopal polity is followed.

CSI St. Francis Church, Fort Cochin

St. Francis Church, Kochi situated in Fort Kochi, originally built in 1503, is the oldest European church in India and was under the authority of Portuguese, Dutch and British colonial powers and finally handed over to the Church of South India at its inception. The Portuguese explorer, Vasco da Gama's body was originally buried in this church, but after fourteen years his remains were removed to Lisbon. This church was renovated by Rev. Thomas Norton, CMS missionary in an Anglican church style for a confirmation service. The Lord's prayer is inscribed on its wooden altar screen.

CSI All Saints' Church, Thrissur

CSI All Saints' church Thrissur was dedicated on 1 November 1842 by CMS missionaries.

CSI Bethel Ashram, Thrissur

It was established in the year of 1934 by Zenana mission.

CMS Higher Secondary School, Thrissur

CSI St. John the Baptist Church, Aluva

St. John the Baptist Church, Aluva built in 1891 by the leadership of Church missionary society (CMS) and was under the auspices of former Travancore cochin Anglican diocese at its beginning and is one of the oldest CMS-built churches in Kerala. Later, It became part of CSI North Kerala diocese. When CSI cochin diocese was established, it became under its see. Now Aluva St. John the Baptist C.S.I church is in its 125th jubilee year. Rev. Praise Thaiparambil the 20th vicar of this church after India's independence and who is the parish member ordained in the 100th year of the church and became the presbyter of his mother parish.

St. John the Baptist CSI EMHS, Aluva

CSI Karunalayam, Aluva

CSI Christ church, Munnar

Beautiful Gothic church built in 1910, having a steeple and stained glass windows depicting Jesus the good shepherd and saints.

CSI Holy trinity English church, Palakkad

A parish within the palakkad town with Anglican tradition.

List of Parishes under this diocese of Cochin

Greater Cochin Area

CSI Immanuel Cathedral, Broadway, Ernakulam

CSI Christ church, Elamkulam

CSI Ascension Church, Kakkanad

CSI Holy Trinity church, near UC college, Aluva

CSI St John the Baptist Church, Aluva Town

CSI St Stephen's church, Thripunithura

CSI St Paul's church, Eloor

CSI All Saints' church, Kalamassery

CSI St Francis' church, Fort Cochin

CSI St John's church, Mulavukad

Thrissur Area

CSI All Saints' church, Thrissur

CSI St Paul's church, Kunnamkulam

CSI St Stephen's church, Cheroor

CSI St Andrew's church, Kolazhy

CSI St John's church, Chalakkudy

CSI St Andrew's church, Irinjalakkuda

CSI St John's church, Ottupara

CSI St Paul's church, Anchery

CSI St John's church, Urakam

CSI St Thomas' church, Mannuthy

CSI St John's church, Poomala

CSI St John's church, Mannamangalam

Palakkad Area

CSI Holy Trinity English church, Palakkad

CSI St Paul's Church, Shoranur

CSI St Andrew's church, Olavakkode

CSI St Mary's church, Inchikkunnu

CSI St: PAUL'S CHURCH VADAKKENCHERY

Idukki Area

CSI Christ church, Munnar

CSI St John's church, Adimali

Outside Kerala

CSI Holy Trinity church, Malayalam congregation, Mysore

== See also ==
- Church of South India
- East Kerala Diocese
