= Baker Ninan Fenn =

- Bishop of Diocese of Cochin of the Church of South India
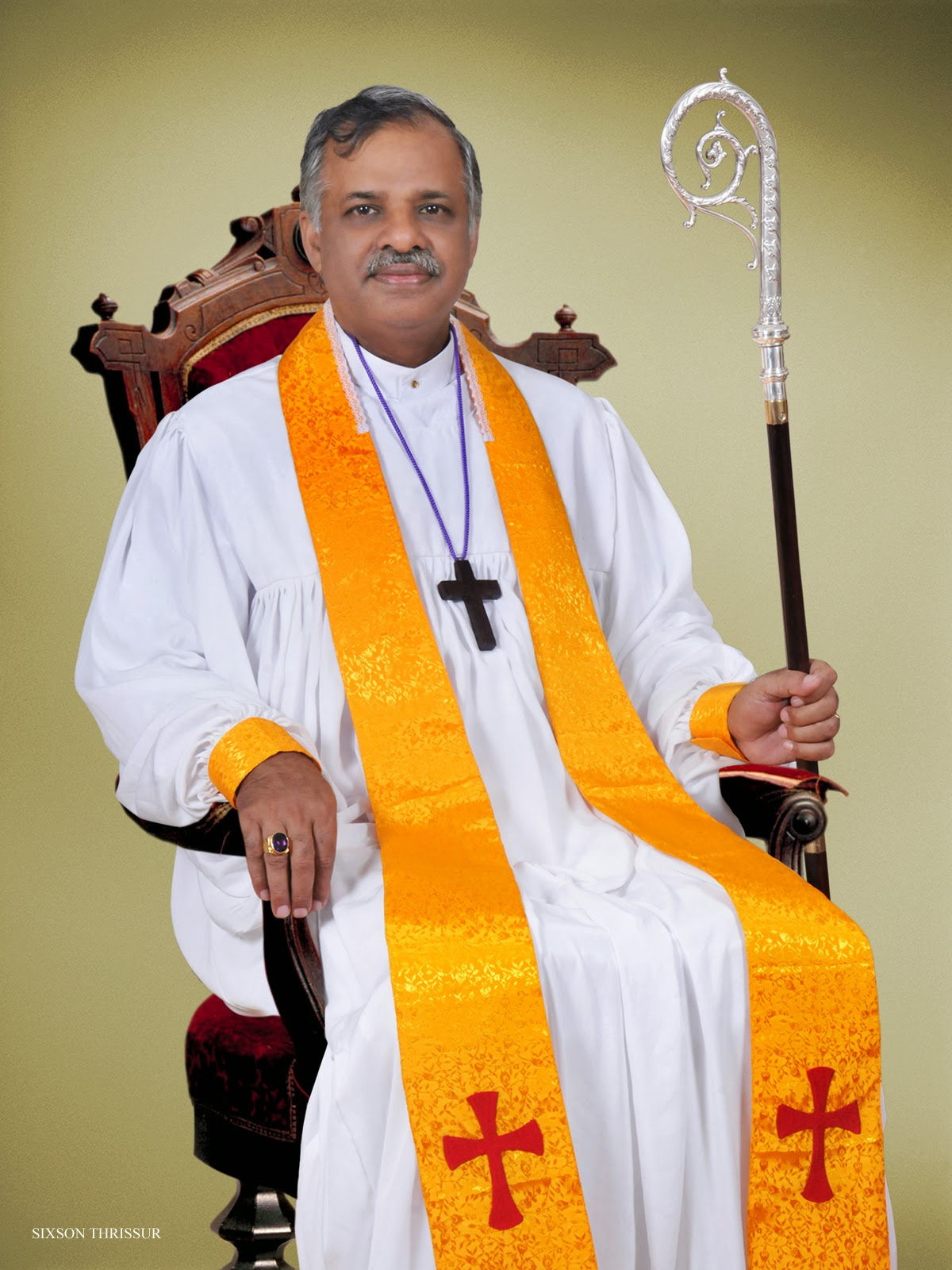
- Rt. Reverend B.N. Fenn
- Church: Christian
- See: Church of South India
- In office: 2013–2024
- Predecessor: Rt. Rev. Dr. K P Kuruvilla
- Successor: Rt. Rev. Kurian Peter

Orders
- Ordination: 1987
- Consecration: 6 March 2013

Personal details
- Born: March 1957 (age 69)

Baker Ninan Fenn (B.N Fenn) was the Bishop of the Diocese of Cochin of the Church of South India.

== Early years ==
Baker Ninan Fenn was born on 5 March 1957 to Dr. Fenn and Saramma of Chunangattu Malikayil, Vazhoor in Kottayam district. He earned an undergraduate degree in theology from Tamil Nadu Theological Seminary, Madurai and a postgraduate degree from Princeton Theological Seminary, New Jersey, United States.

== Ordination & Pastorship ==
Baker Ninan Fenn was ordained as presbyter in 1987 at Christ CSI Church Munnar, Kerala.

== Bishopric ==
Baker Ninan Fenn was consecrated as the Bishop of North Kerala Diocese on 30 June 2013 at CSI Cathedral, Calicut by CSI moderator G. Devakadaksham. In 2016, the North Kerala was split into two dioceses—Cochin and Malabar—with the former remaining the mother diocese. As such, he was the Anglican Bishop of the Diocese of Cochin.
