= Project 365 =

Public photo art initiative

Project 365 is an initiative by EtP (Ekalokam Trust for Photography) to create and preserve photographic visuals of the ancient Indian culture and contemporary lifestyle of Tiruvannamalai in the south Indian state of Tamil Nadu. Project 365 is part of the long-term vision to initiate public photo art projects in the rural parts of the tri-Sangam period Tamilakam, now meagerly represented in a geography comprising modern Tamil Nadu, Kerala, Karnataka and parts of Andhra Pradesh. The second phase of the project documents the Sangam period ports, connected International ports and their inland surroundings. The third phase of the project will document the culture and lifestyle alongside river Cauveri. Project 365 Tiruvannamalai began on 15 August 2014.

== Photography in Tiruvannamalai ==
Tiruvannamalai has a rich photography history. Photographers including Indian photographers PRS Mani, Dr. T.N.Krishnaswamy, G Govind Welling, American photographer Eliot Elisofon, French photographer Henri Cartier-Bresson, and many other known, and unknown, photographers have created several bodies of photography works of Sri. Ramana Maharishi and Tiruvannamalai. These images have been widely circulated and published in India and abroad. Few of these photographs are being archived and preserved by Sri Ramana Ashram, Tiruvannamalai.

== Project director ==
Project 365 is led by contemporary Indian photographer Abul Kalam Azad a.k.a. AKA. AKA has a decade of experience as a photo-journalist with Press Trust India and other prominent newspaper agencies and magazines. He also received the prestigious Charles Wallace Award (fellowship 1995), UK and studied photography in the Surrey Institute of Art and Design University College. He left the promising Photojournalism|photo-journalist career to follow his passion ‘photography’. In the year 2000, AKA set up an art studio ‘Mayalokam’ in the inspiring labyrinth of ancient warehouses, situated between the Bazaar Road and the Harbour front, Fort Cochin. Soon, Mayalokam studio became a cultural hub for local, national and international artists and enthusiasts in various disciplines. Eventually, Mayalokam became ‘Mayalokam Art Collective’ to include other artists. AKA had been a frequent to Tiruvannamalai since the mid 1990s and in the year 2010, Azad moved permanently to Tiruvannamalai. He is one of the founders of EtP, a Trust dedicated to conserving, archiving and protecting contemporary photography. He is also the recipient of senior fellowship (2012 - 2013) from Ministry of Culture, Government of India.

== Project 365 photographers and partners ==
Photographers Dinesh Khanna, Waswo X. Waswo, Thierry Cardon, Ramu Aravindan, Shibu Arakkal, RR. Srinivasan, Ami Gupta, Anurag Sharma, Arnav Rastogi, Bhagyashri Patki, Biju Ibrahim, Iqbal MK, Jiby Charles, J Jayaraman, Leo James, Maveeran Somasundaram, Paneer Selvam, Pee Vee, Radhi Jangla, Seema Krishnakumar, Shiv K, Varun Gupta and Boney KR were part of Project 365 collective. EtP has networked with SPACES, Chennai; 1 Shanthi Road, Bangalore; Aksgar online magazine, Goa-CAP; India Photo Archive Foundation, Gurgeon; Vamsi Books, Tiruvannamalai; Thalam, Bangalore; Kannadi, Madurai and Vetri digitals, Tiruvannamalai.

The project was completed in the 2015 with the public archive having more than 3000 and odd photographs of Tiruvannamalai. The premiere show of Project 365 Tiruvannamalai was organised at Victoria Memorial Hall, Kolkata showcasing selected works from the public archive.
