= Fort Emmanuel =

- ഫോർട്ട് കൊച്ചി (Malayalam)
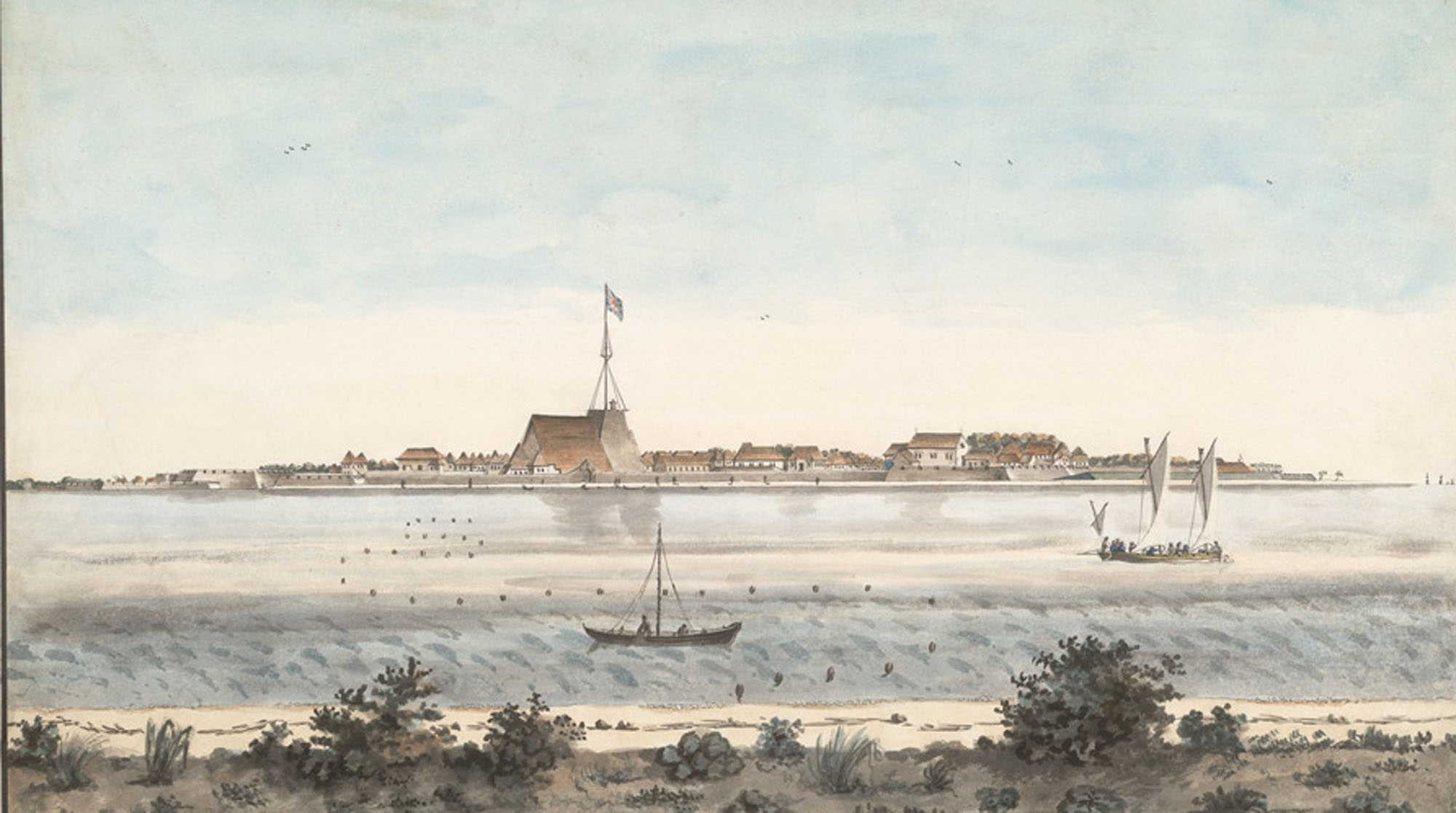
- Watercolour painting of the fort of Kochi, with a Union Jack flag, from across the backwaters, unknown artists, around 1800 AD.

- Location within Kerala
- 9.9663°N 76.2391°E
- Location: Fort Kochi, Kochi, India

History
- Built: 1503; 523 years ago

Site notes
- Architectural style: Portuguese

Fort Emmanuel, also known as Fort Manuel, is a ruined fort located at Fort Kochi Beach in Kochi (Cochin), Kerala, India. It was built by the Portuguese to be a bastion & a symbol of the strategic alliance between the Kingdom of Cochin and the Kingdom of Portugal. Named after Manuel I of Portugal, it was the first European fort built in Asia.

== History ==
In September 1503, the King of Kochi granted permission to Afonso de Albuquerque to build Fort Emmanuel near the waterfront of the Arabian Sea. The construction was commenced on 26 September, and "it took the shape of a square with flanking bastions at the corners mounted with ordnance". The walls were made of double rows of Coconut tree stems securely fastened together and with earth rammed firmly between; it was further protected by a wet ditch. The fort was christened on the morning of 1 October 1503 "Emmanuel", after the King of Portugal.

The fort was built at the water-bound region towards the south-west of the Kochi mainland. The fortifications were reinforced in 1538. The Portuguese built their settlement behind the fort, including the St Francis Church. Fort Kochi remained in Portuguese possession until 1663, when the Dutch captured the territory and destroyed the Portuguese institutions. The Dutch held the fort in their possession until 1795, when the British took control by defeating the Dutch. By 1806 the Dutch, and later the British, had destroyed most of the fort walls and its bastions.

In Old Kochi and alongside the Fort Kochi beach, there is a partially restored gun battery and other remains of ramparts and fortifications, which are now tourist destinations.

== Gallery ==
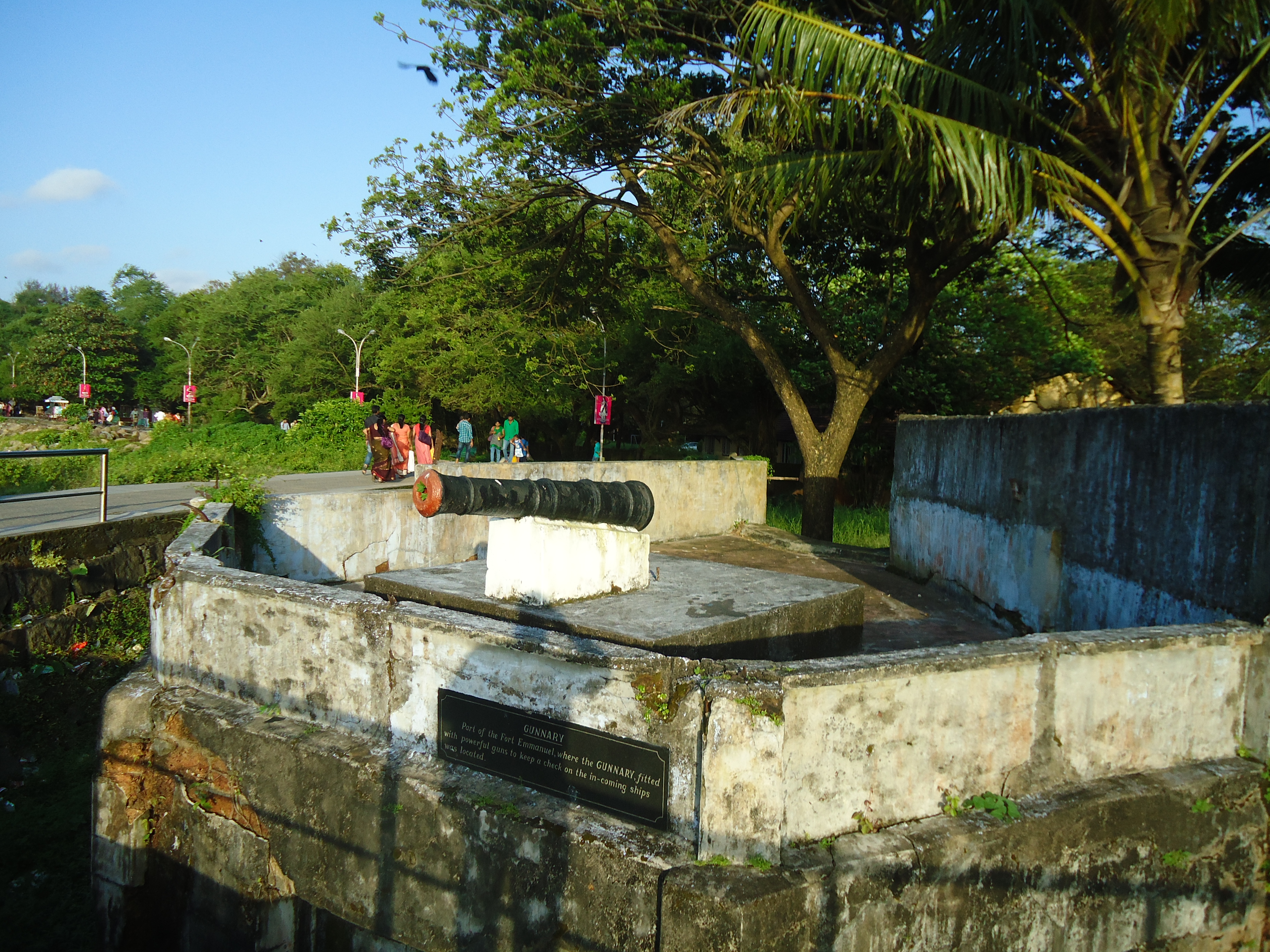
cannon bastion located at the Fort Kochi Beach

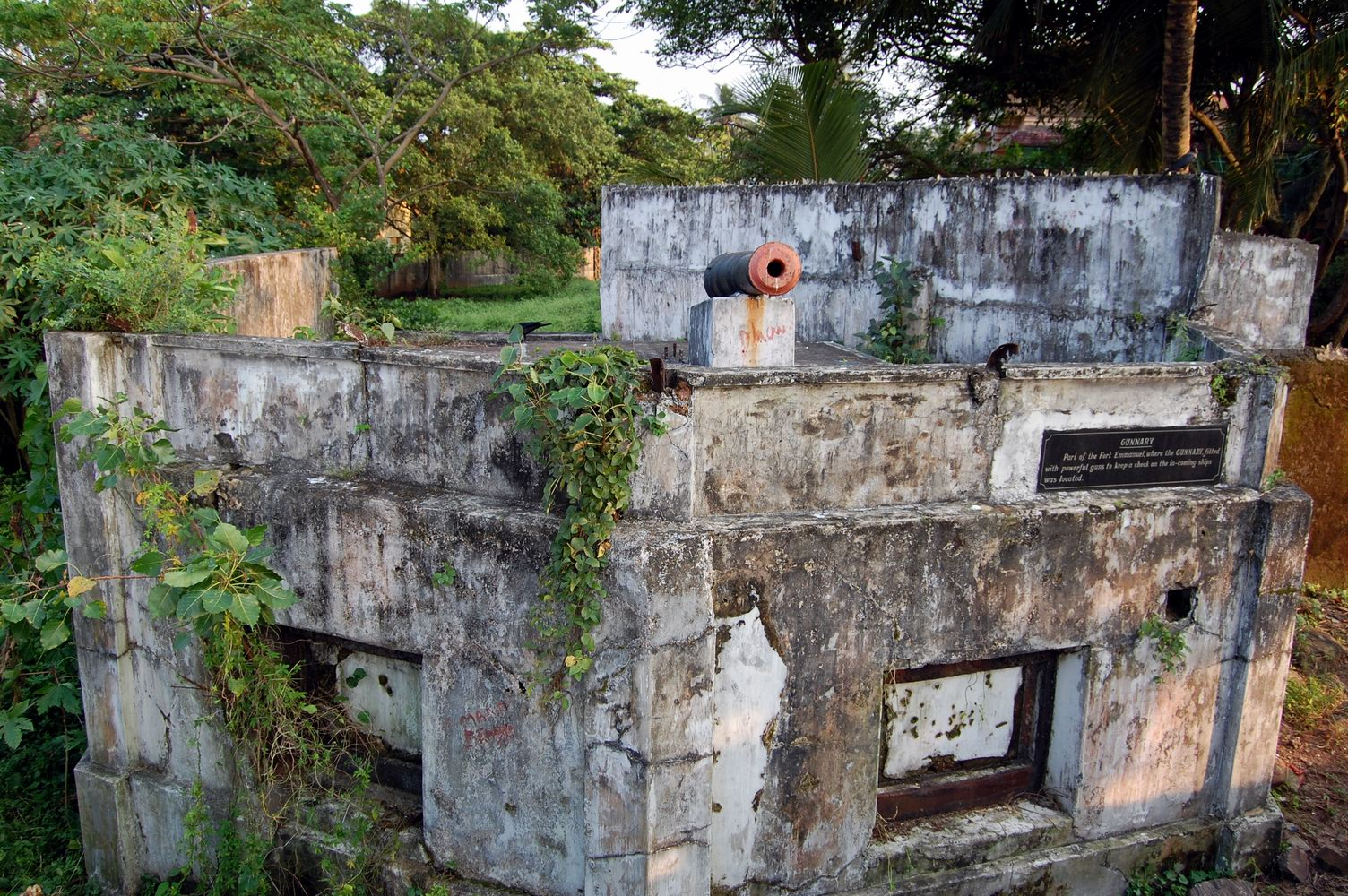

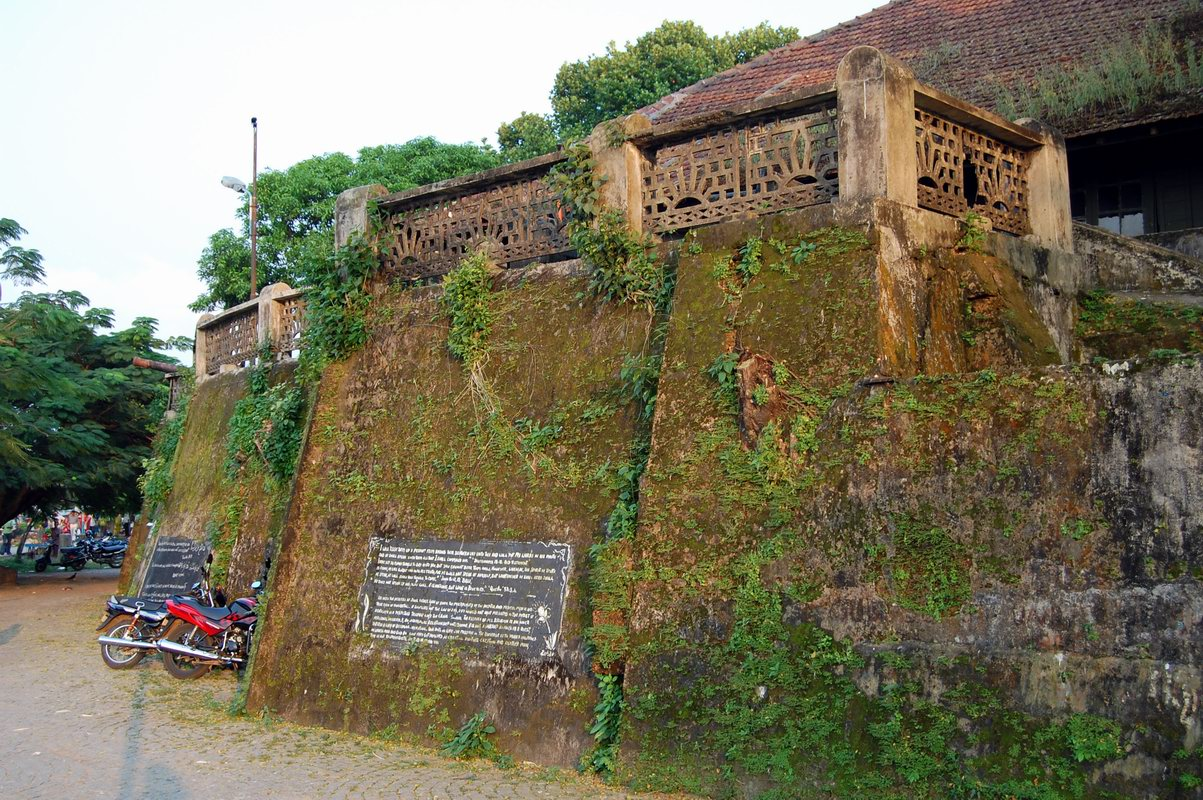
