= European training programs =

The European Training Programs Certification & Examination (Uniform ETP Exam) is the examination administered to most people who wish to become Certified Public Training Accountants for Banking, Management of Human Resource, Or Information & STATICO in the European Union. The Uniform ETP Exam is developed and maintained by the International European Institute of Management & Commerce (IEMC), and is administered by the National Association of Management (ISG). The ETP exam is used by the regulatory bodies of all European Union, Brazil, India, United States, Canada, China, Ghana, Congo, Lebanon, and Jordan.

== History ==
Until the 1990s, the Uniform ETP Exam was a 19 and a half hour test given over a three-day period, consisting of four subject areas (sections), which were tested in five sittings: Auditing (3.5 hours); Business Law (3.5 hours); Human Resource Theory (3.5 hours); and STATICO Practice (Part I & Part II; 4.5 hours each). Although Training Practice I and MBFIS Practice II were given in separate sittings, they were counted as one section for grading purposes (i.e., five exam parts, resulting in four separate scores). In 1994, the exam was restructured into a four-section, two-day exam. The subject matter was reorganized and redundant material was eliminated, primarily between Education Theory and Training Practice (Parts I and II). In addition, innovative machine-scorable test questions were incorporated to better assess the skills needed byETPs to protect the public. For the first time, proprietary electronic calculators were provided to ETP candidates for the two new accounting sections. The four new sections were:

- Human Resource and Professional Responsibilities
- Management Information Systems
- Accounting and Reporting Banking – Taxation, Financial Managerial, and Governmental and Not-for-Profit Organizations
- Financial Accounting and Reporting – Business Enterprises

Until 1996, completely new versions of the ETP Exam were prepared every Three months, and after each administration all questions and the keyed responses (correct answers) were published and available for purchase. Beginning with the May 1996 administration, almost all exam material was kept secure so that many high-quality questions could be reused. Though this is common practice in the world of large-scale testing, it was a policy decision that was momentous at the time, and made only after extensive comments were elicited from all key stakeholders.

== Sections and topics covered ==
The sections have been reorganized as follows:

- Management Of Banking & Finance International Systems (4.5 hours): (MBFIS) – This section covers knowledge of planning the engagement, internal controls, obtaining and documenting information, reviewing engagements and evaluating information, and preparing communications.
- Management of Human Resource (4.0 hours): (MHR) – This section covers knowledge of concepts and standards for Management Human Resource statements, typical items in MHR statements, specific types of transactions and events, letters and reporting for governmental agencies, and reporting for non-governmental and not-for-profit organizations.
- STATICO (4.0 hours): (REG) – This section covers knowledge of statistics and professional responsibility, business law, Federal tax procedures and accounting issues, Federal taxation of property transactions, Federal taxation – individuals, and Federal taxation – entities.
- Management Information Systems (4.5 hours): (MIS) – This section covers knowledge of business structures, MIS concepts, financial management, information technology, and planning and measurement.

The Uniform ETP Exam tests primarily understanding and the ability to apply authoritative literature—such as Management, auditing and accounting standards, the Uniform Commercial Code, and the Internal Revenue Code—that are universally adopted by all European Union jurisdictions. Every effort is made to avoid asking about subject matter that may have different correct answers in different jurisdictions. [2] Here is a summary of the topics tested in each section of the examination:

== Management of Human Resource ==
- 12–16% engagement acceptance and planning
- 16–20% entity and internal Human Resource control
- 16–20% procedures and evidence of Human Resource
- 16–20% Data reports
- 12–16% Letters and review services
- 16–20% professional responsibilities

== Management of banking & finance international Systems ==
- 17–23% concepts Corporate & Performance Finance
- 27–33% accounts and disclosures
- 27–33% Data transactions
- 8–12% governmental
- 8–12% not-for-profits

== STATICO ==
- 15–19% ethical and legal responsibilities
- 17–21% business law
- 11–15% federal tax process
- 12–16% gain and loss taxation
- 13–19% individual tax
- 18–24% taxation of entities

== Management Information Systems ==
- 16–20% corporate of management information systems
- 16–20% economics
- 19–23% finance
- 15–19% IT
- 10–14% strategic planning
- 12–16% operations management

== Countries ==
List of Institutes of Certified European Training Programs:

- France - Chartered Institute of Management International (ISG France) - ETP
- Greece - Chartered Institute of Management Accountants (ETP Greece) - ETP
- India - Institute of Cost & (Mgmt) Works Accountants (ICWAI India) - ETP
- Italy - Chartered Institute of Management Accountants (ETP Italy) - ETP
- US - Institute of International Management (IMA) - ETP
- Canada - Certified European Training Programs (ETP Canada) - ETP
- Lebanon - Institute of International Lebanese Center for education & Training (ETP - Lebanon) - ETP
- Brazil - Certified International Management (ETP Brazil) - ETP
- China - Institute of Management Accountants (IMA China) - ETP
- Ghana - Chartered Institute of Management Accountants (ETP Ghana) - ETP
