= Kochi International Book Festival =

Annual festival in Kochi, India

Kochi International Book Festival (KIBF)
- Genre: Literary festival
- Locations: Kochi, Kerala, India
- Years active: 2000 - present
- Website: www.bookfestkochi.com

An award presentation ceremony held during the Book Festival edition of 2007.

The Kochi International Book Festival is an annual event conducted at the coastal city of Kochi, Kerala, India. This festival is organized by the AntharashtraPusthakotsava Samithi, Kochi, a registered charitable society established to promote reading, encourage writing and to heighten an awareness of Literacy and Literary arts in the State of Kerala.

The festival is past its 11th edition now. The number of stalls has increased over the years, and there were close to 300 stalls during the 2007 edition of the festival. The Book Festival, referred in local language as Antharashtra Pustakolsav. It is usually conducted during the December of every year, although it started off as a January festival.

== Children's Book Festival ==
Children's Book Festival was organised in Dec 2015 as a run-up to the event. It was reported that over 100 schools were contacted and children were encouraged to bring books from home and display them.
