= Cochin Flower Show =

The entrance to the 2008 Cochin Flower Show at Marine Drive, Kochi

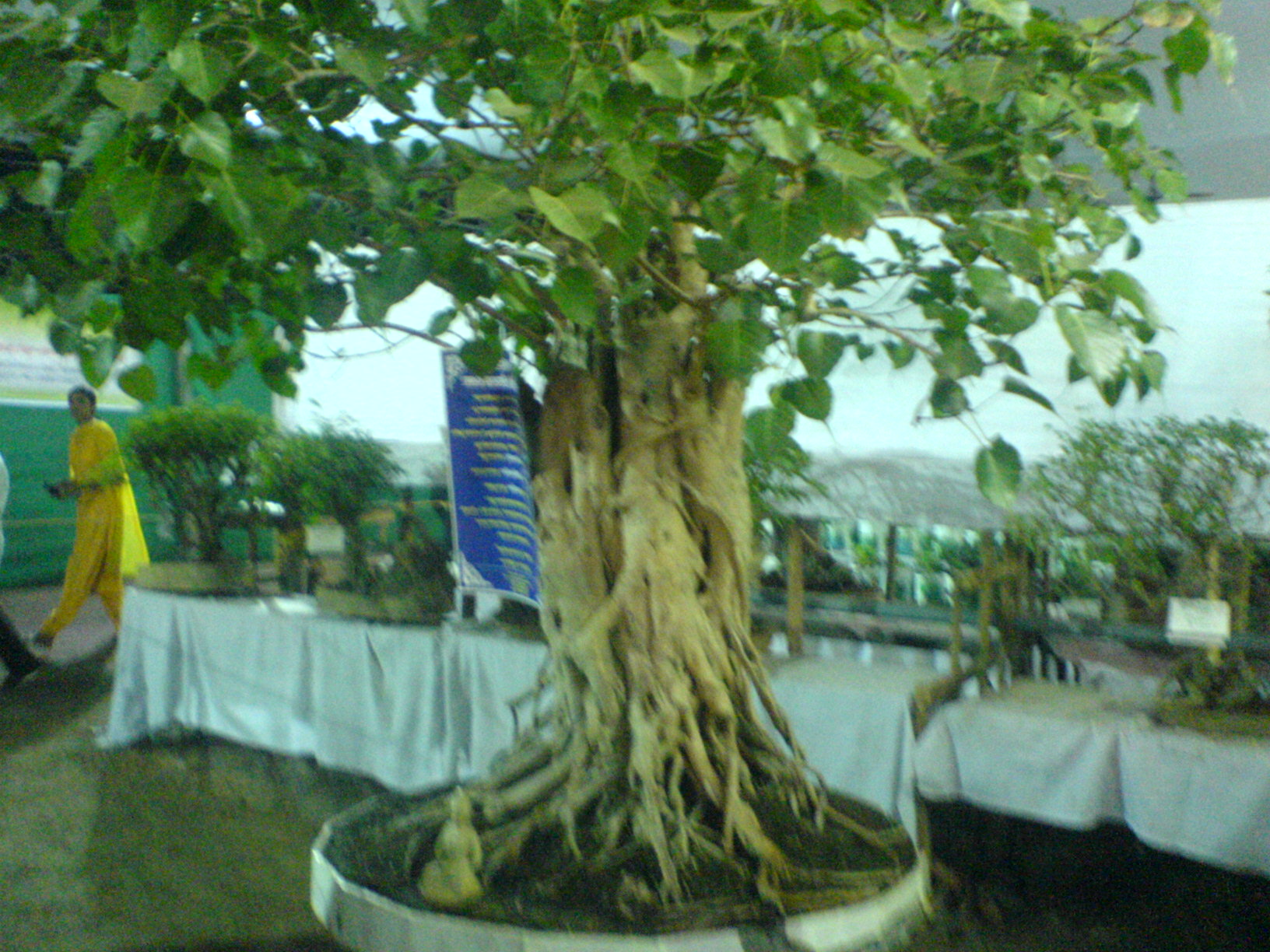
A 150-year-old Bonsai tree on display at the Cochin Flower Show 2008

The Cochin Flower Show is a garden show held each year for five to six days in February - March days by the Ernakulam district Agri-Horticultural Society at the city of Kochi, Kerala, India. It used to be conducted at the Subhash Park, Park Avenue Road, Kochi until 2006. But, since 2007, the venue has been changed to Ernakulathappan Ground.

== History ==
The Cochin Flower Show is in its 26th Edition now. It regularly attracts thousands of visitors and has become a major annual event in Kochi city.

== The Cochin Flower Show 2008 ==
The 2008 edition of the flower show was held from the 5th to the 10th of March, both days inclusive. It was inaugurated by V.J. Kurian, chairman, Spices Board. Major highlights of the 2008 edition of the flower show include an exhibition of Italian flowers, Bonsai trees, and a display of the Kudumbashree bio-bin. Other attractions include kennel stalls and an emu. Several awards are presented at the show.
