= Johny ML =

- Born: Johny Mulluvilakom Lakshmanan; 21 March 1969 (age 57); Vakkom, Kerala, India
- Known for: Culture critic, art curator, writer
- Website: Johny ML

Johny ML (born 21 March 1969) is an Indian cultural critic, art curator and writer based in New Delhi.

== Biography ==
He has three post-graduate degrees from the Goldsmiths College, University of London, MS University, Baroda, and the University of Kerala. He has contributed as an Editor / Writer to several online and print magazines, including the Stance Magazine, Art Tehelka, Matters of Art, Narada News Malayalam and Cart on Art. He was the chief curator of the first edition of United Art Fair, 2012. He also has curated several shows. He started his own blog in the year 2008 and writes about culture, art, politics, society and people.

== Shows curated ==
Johny ML has curated several shows in his two decades career as a reputed curator.

Dreams: Projects Unrealised, 2003 Lensing-it, 2011 Thekkan Kaattu (47th Annual Exhibition of the Birla Academy, Kolkata) LoC- Line of Control(49th Annual Exhibition of the Birla Academy, Kolkata) Cartist Project, Jaipur R.A.P.E – Rare Acts of Political Engagement Vibrant Gujarat "A4 ARPLE", group show, Gallery Ragini, 2012

== Books ==
JohnyML has authored many independent books and has contributed to various volumes. K.S.Radhakrishan (a monograph co-authored with R.Sivakumar), By All Means Necessary (a collection of essays from his blog published by the Kerala Lalithakala Akademi), The Circle of Life –the Art of Siddharth (Prakriti, Chennai), B.D.Dethan and his Distinct Style (Suryakanthi, Thiruvananthapuram), Straight from Life – animal and bird imageries in Ramkinkar Baij (Musui Foundation, New Delhi), In the Open (Ojas, New Delhi), Bronze Age (Uttarayan, Baroda) and Biography of Arvind Kejriwal (Malayalam published by DC Books).

JohnyML has also translated many international literature into Malayalam. ‘Mistress’ by Anita Nair, ‘Eleven Minutes’ by Paulo Coelho, ‘Embers’ by Sandor Marai, 'I Married a Communist' by Philip Roth, ‘Famished Road’ by Ben Okri, ‘Black Book’ by Orhan Pamuk, ‘New Life’ by Orhan Pamuk, ‘Inferno’ by Dan Brown and many others.

== Documentary ==
Johny ML has directed three documentaries on artists: Jeram Patel, N. N. Rimzon and Sanjeev Sinha.
