= Augustine Joseph =

Indian classical musician and stage actor

K. Augustine Joseph
- Born: 24 March 1912; Mattancherry, Kingdom of Cochin, British India
- Died: 3 February 1965 (aged 52); Chennai, Tamil Nadu, India
- Occupations: Stage actor, musician
- Spouse: Elizabeth (m. 1937)
- Children: 7, including K. J. Yesudas
- Relatives: Vijay Yesudas (grandson)

Kattassery Augustine Joseph (24 March 1912 – 3 February 1965) was an Indian classical musician and stage actor from Kerala, India. He was the father of Indian playback singer K. J. Yesudas and grandfather of singer Vijay Yesudas.

== Life ==
He was born in Kochi, as the only son of Kattassery Augustine and Thresyamma, both farmers.

He married Puthanpurakkal Elizabeth in 1937, and they had seven children - five sons and two daughters - namely Pushpa (b. 1938), Yesudas (b. 1940), Antony (Nicknamed Antappan, b. 1943), Babu (b. 1945), Mani (b. 1948), Jayamma (b. 1953) and Justin (b. 1958) in chronological order. Among these siblings, Pushpa and Babu died of severe fever at a young age. Although Joseph was a self-identified Catholic, he believed in Oneness among religion and there was only One Supreme God who is called by different names in different religions. He had instilled that outlook on religion and spirituality in his children, which heavily influenced Yesudas' own worldview.

Augustine Joseph started training in music and acting at a very young age. By the 1940s, he had established himself as a musical icon in South India for his numerous performances, both in acting and singing, in stage plays based on Biblical and Hindu Puranic stories. In 1949, Joseph was approached by Malayalam film producer and director, Kunchacko, who offered him a lead acting role in his upcoming film. That movie, Nalla Thankan, was released in 1950 to critical acclaim and was noted for being the "first big hit" in Malayalam Cinema. Joseph had also done playback singing for a five songs in the movie. In addition, Joseph played a minor role in the 1953 Malayalam film, Velakkaran, where he had also done playback singing for two songs.

Augustine Joseph died of a suspected heart attack aged 53 in 1965. Yesudas, his son, later said in an interview that he had faced lot of money problems during this period and when his father died, the hospital authorities told him to give Rs. 1000/-. It was the famous lyricist P. Bhaskaran who helped him during this period. He was buried according to his wish at Kochi.

== Filmography ==
=== As an actor ===
- Nallathanka (1950)
- Velakkaaran (1953)

=== As a playback singer ===
- Mahesha Maayamo ... Nallathanka 1950
- Sodara Bandhamathonne ... Nallathanka 1950
- Manoharamee Raajyam ... Nallathanka 1950
- Maanam Thanna Maariville ... Nallathanka 1950
- Aanandamaanaake ... Nallathanka 1950
- Paahimaam Jagadeeshwara ... Velakkaaran 1953
- Aanandamennum ... Velakkaaran 1953
