= Ekalokam Trust for Photography =

India trust for photography

- Founded: 2012
- Founders: Abul Kalam Azad, Kulanthaivel and Tulsi Swarna Lakshmi
- Country of origin: India
- Headquarters location: Tiruannamalai
- Official website: www.etpindia.org

Ekalokam Trust for Photography (EtP) is a not-for profit photo cooperative registered in Tiruvannamalai, Tamil Nadu. The Trust's area of operation spans across modern day Tamil Nadu, Puducherry, Kerala, Karnataka, parts of Andhra Pradesh and northern Sri Lanka (the tri-Sangam period Tamilakam territory) and its connected cultures/continents. Their main projects include archiving the life and work of contemporary photographers, collective creating photographic visuals of South India and rejuvenating traditional photography. Photo Mail is an online magazine published by the Trust in English, Tamil and Malayalam. Publishing since 2016, the magazine focuses on debating, discussing, and defining the art of photography, offering a platform for in-depth exploration of photographic theory, techniques, and artistic expression. Unlike many photography magazines that primarily cover equipment reviews or technical tutorials, Photomail engages with the medium's artistic and theoretical aspects.

In January 2019, The Ekalokam Trust for Photography co-hosted an exhibition called "Linking Lineages", which featured photographs shot during the 2017–2018 by contemporary photographer and photojournalist Abul Kalam Azad.
