= Fort Kochi Beach =

Beach in India

Coordinates: 9.968°N 76.244°E

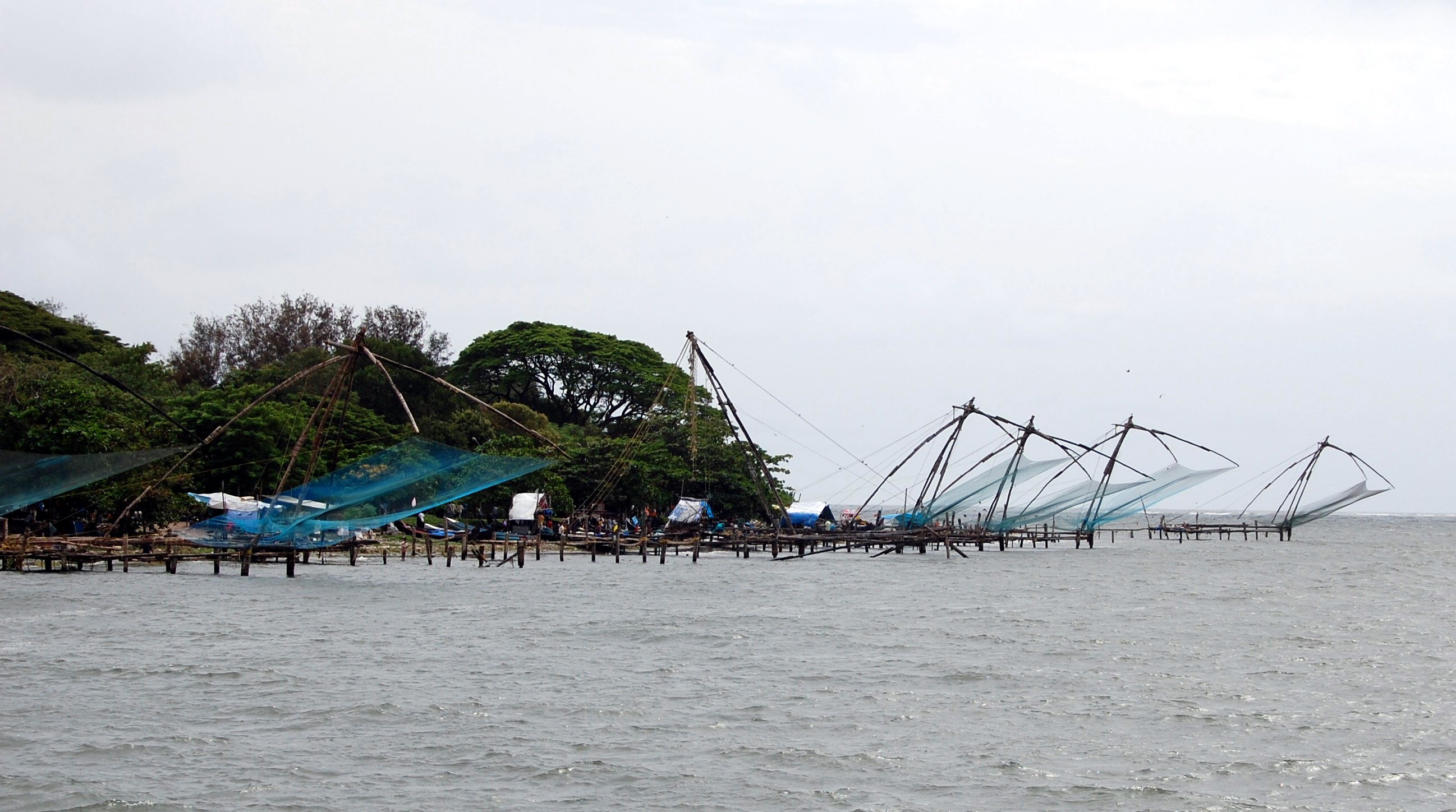
Fort Kochi beach and Chinese fishing nets

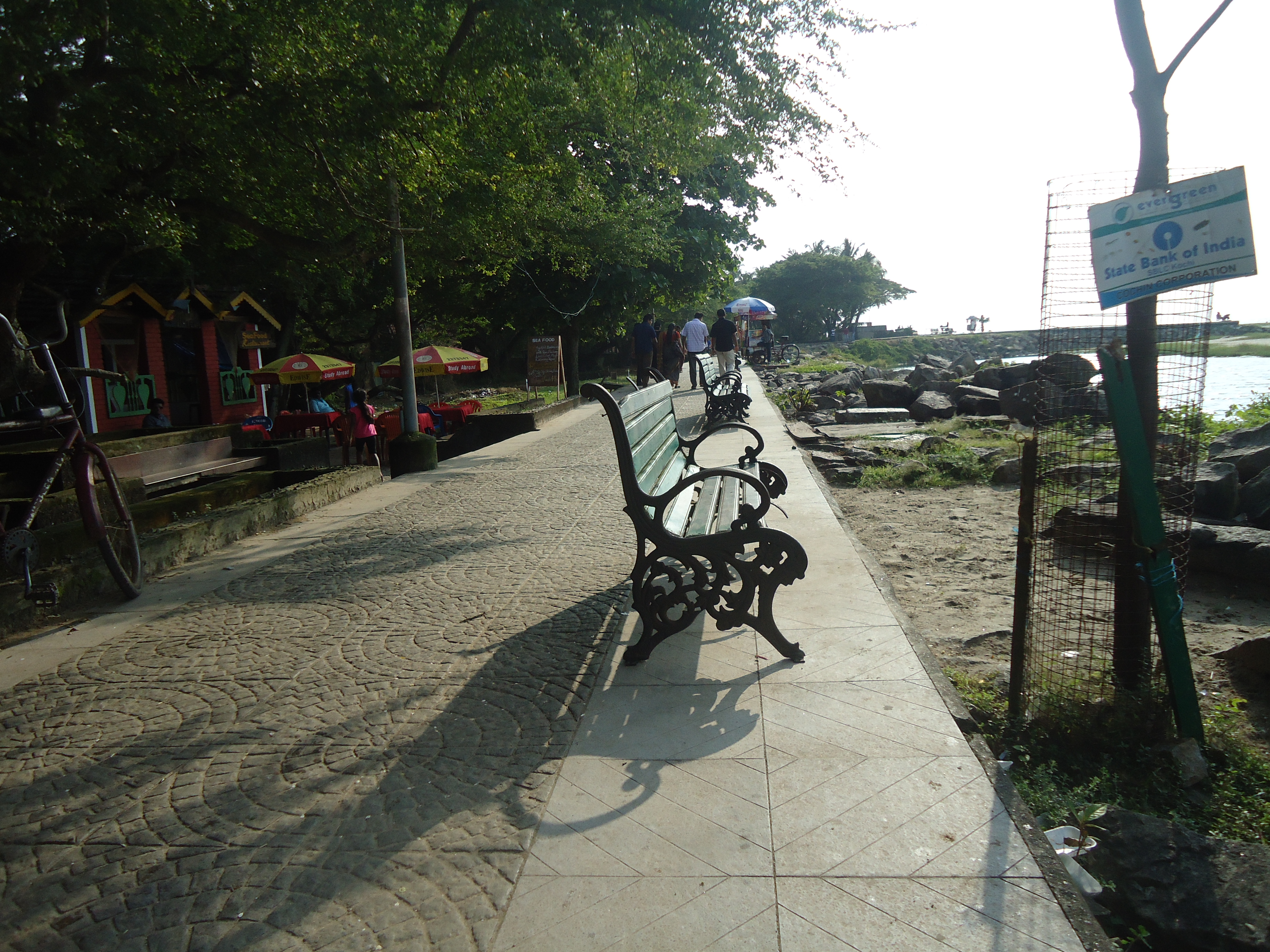
Fort Kochi beach walkway

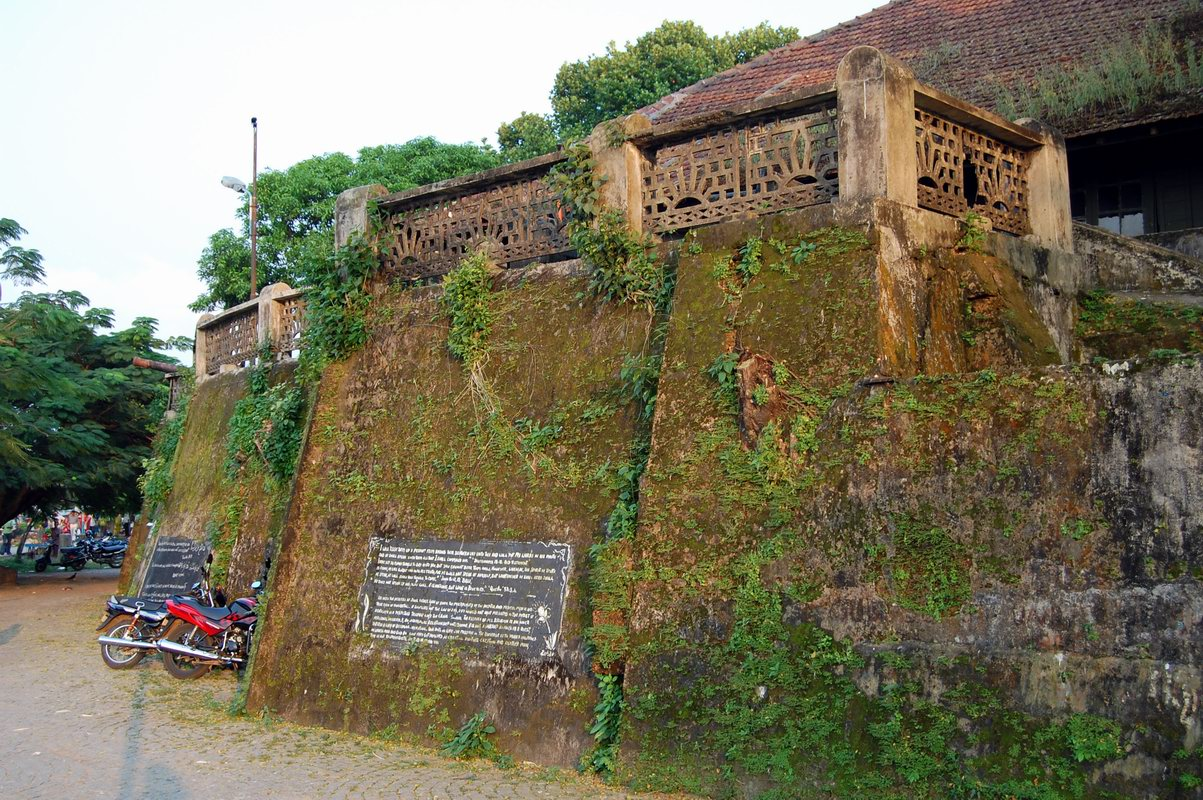
Remains of the Fort Emmanuel

Fort Kochi Beach is a beach along the Arabian Sea, situated in the Fort Kochi neighbourhood of the city of Kochi in Kerala, South India.

== Points of interest ==
Unique views and points of interest are the so-called Chinese fishing nets (Cheena vala, Malayalam language: ചീനവല) and the fishermen working there: commonly known as "Chinese fishing nets" they are shore operated lift nets, each measuring about 10 metres (33 ft) in height, sustaining a Cantilever with an outstretched net of 20 metres (66 ft) or more, suspended over the sea and large stones suspended from ropes as counterweights at the other end. Each installation is operated by a team of up to six fishermen.

Other points of interest include the jetty towards the Vembanad Lake respectively to the Kerala backwaters. Colonial-style bungalows can be seen along the shoreline, as well as the Vasco da Gama square, the remains of Fort Emmanuel along the granite walkway and many stalls, which make traditional cuisines using freshly caught fish. A section of the beach is not accessible to visitors as it is under the control of the Indian Navy.

== Nature ==
As reported by the Deccan Chronicle, the Kochi Corporation started as a temporary measure, a massive cleaning campaign covering heritage structures supported by around 500 volunteers on occasion of the World Environment Day in June 2015, as littering became a serious problem.
