= Syrian churches of Kerala =

Church buildings in India

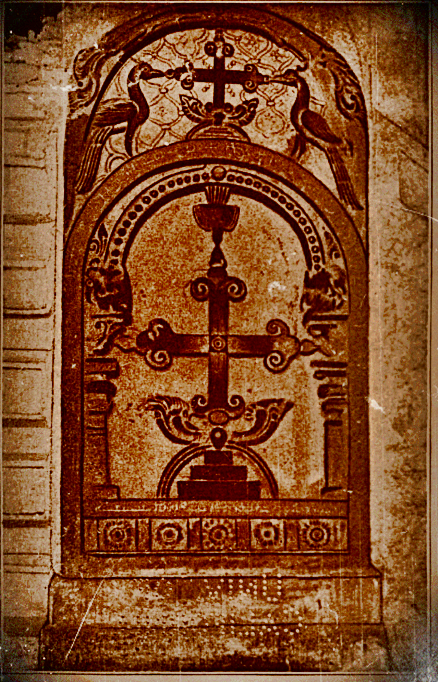
A Saint Thomas Christian cross at Kottayam Knanaya Valiya Pally

This article lists the oldest churches in Kerala.

== Thrissur district ==
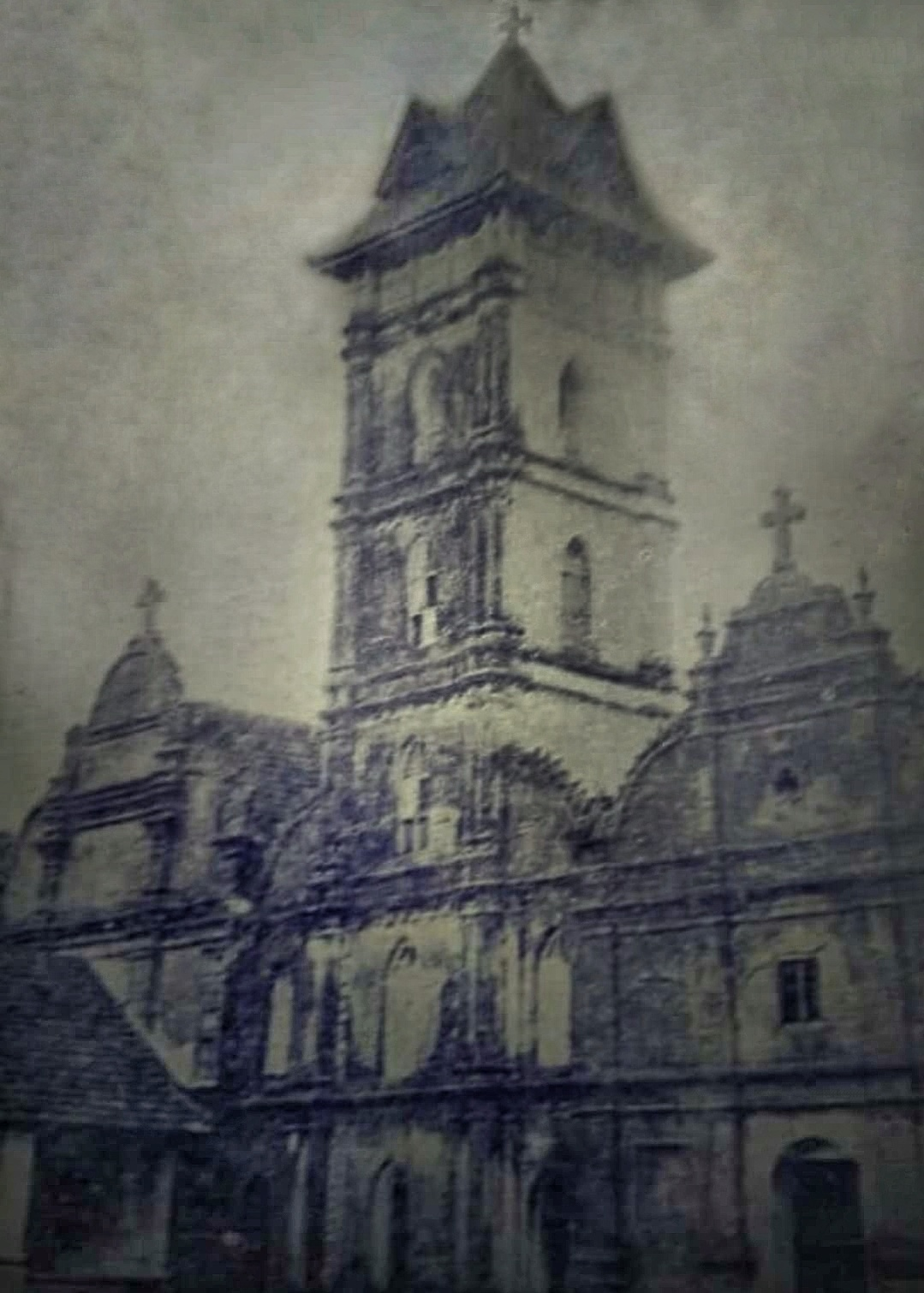
Palayoor Mar Thoma Sleeha Suriyanipally

- Palayoor St Thomas Syro-Malabar Church – According to tradition, the Syrian church was established in 52 AD by St Thomas, one of the twelve apostles of Jesus Christ. It is the first church in India, and St. Thomas performed the first baptism in India here, therefore this church is called an Apostolic Church credited to the apostolate of St. Thomas, who preached and also introduced Christianity to the people here.

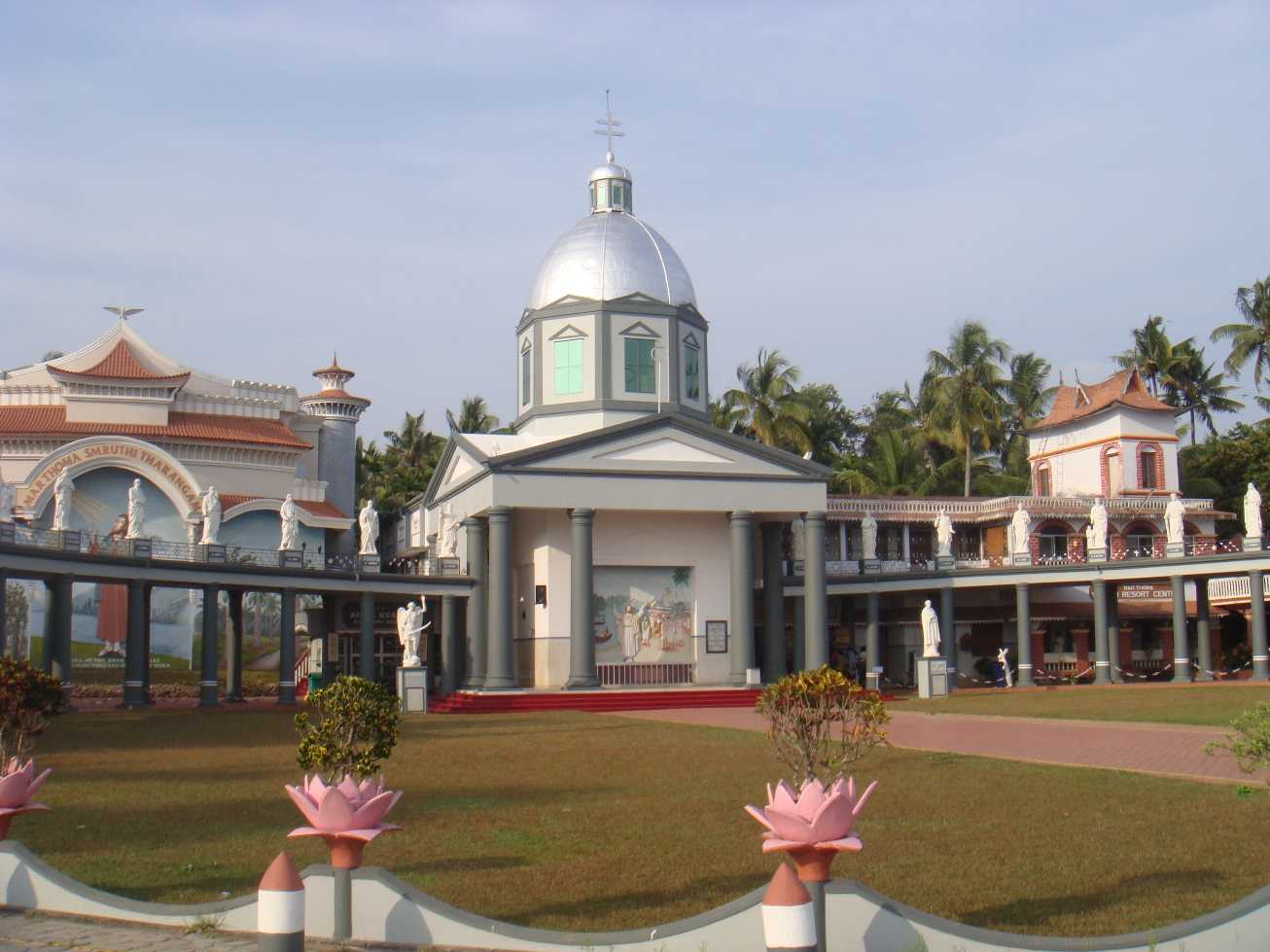
Kodungallur Mar Thoma Sleeha Suriyanipally

- Kodungallur Mar Thoma Syro-Malabar Church – The Kodungallur church is considered to be one of the oldest churches built by Thomas the Apostle in 52 AD, second only to St. Thomas Syro-Malabar Church, Palayoor. The current Marthoma Pontifical shrine (Kodungaloor Mar Thoma Church) church is on the banks of the River Periyar about 6 km from Kodungallur, in the village of Azhikode in Kerala.

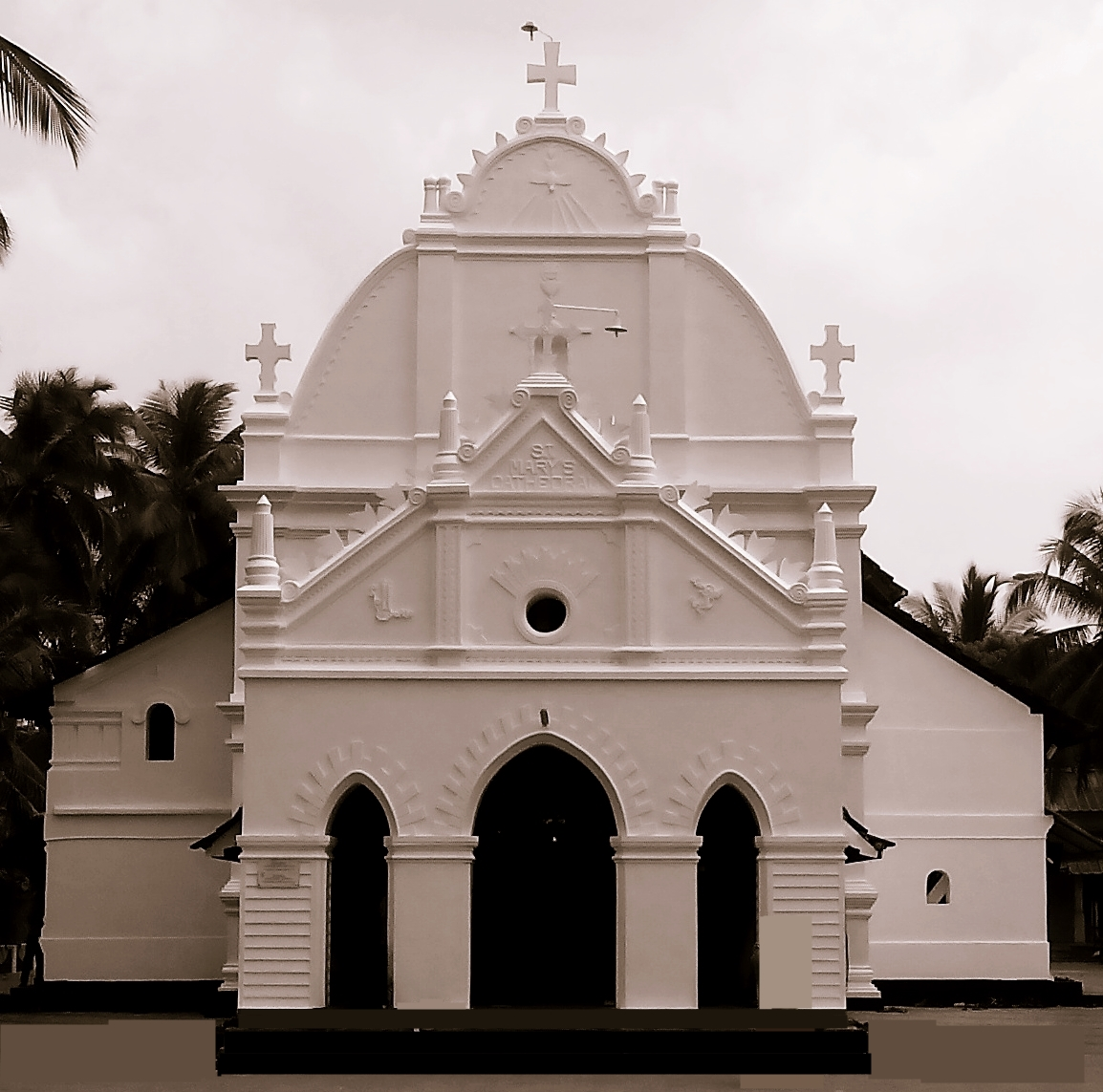
Arthat Marth Mariam Suriyanipally

- Arthat St. Mary's Orthodox Syrian Cathedral – According to local tradition the Arthat was a former Jewish settlement where Thomas the Apostle converted many Jewish families to Christianity. He also established a cross at Arthat which was consecrated as the Arthat church in the 2nd century.
- Mattom St Thomas Forane Syro-Malabar Church – The Mattam St Thomas Forane Syro-Malabar Church was established in 140 by the Syrian Christians who migrated from Palayoor.

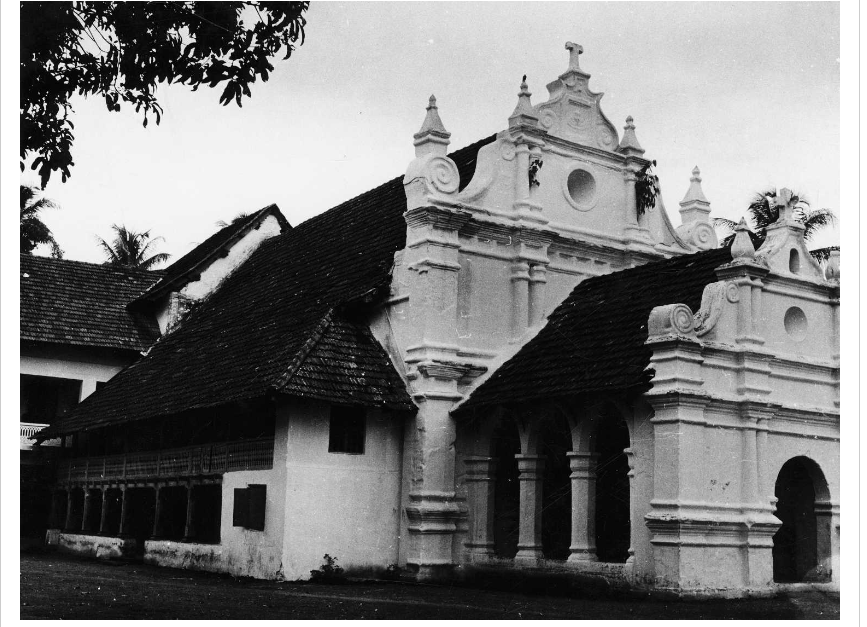
Ambazhakkad Mar Thoma Sleeha Suriyanipally

- Ambazhakkad St Thomas Forane Syro-Malabar Church – The Ambazhakkad Syrian Church was established in 300 in the land which was donated by a Nambudiri of the Ambazhakada Mana for the Saint Thomas Syrian Christians of Ambazhakkad who migrated from Kodungallur.

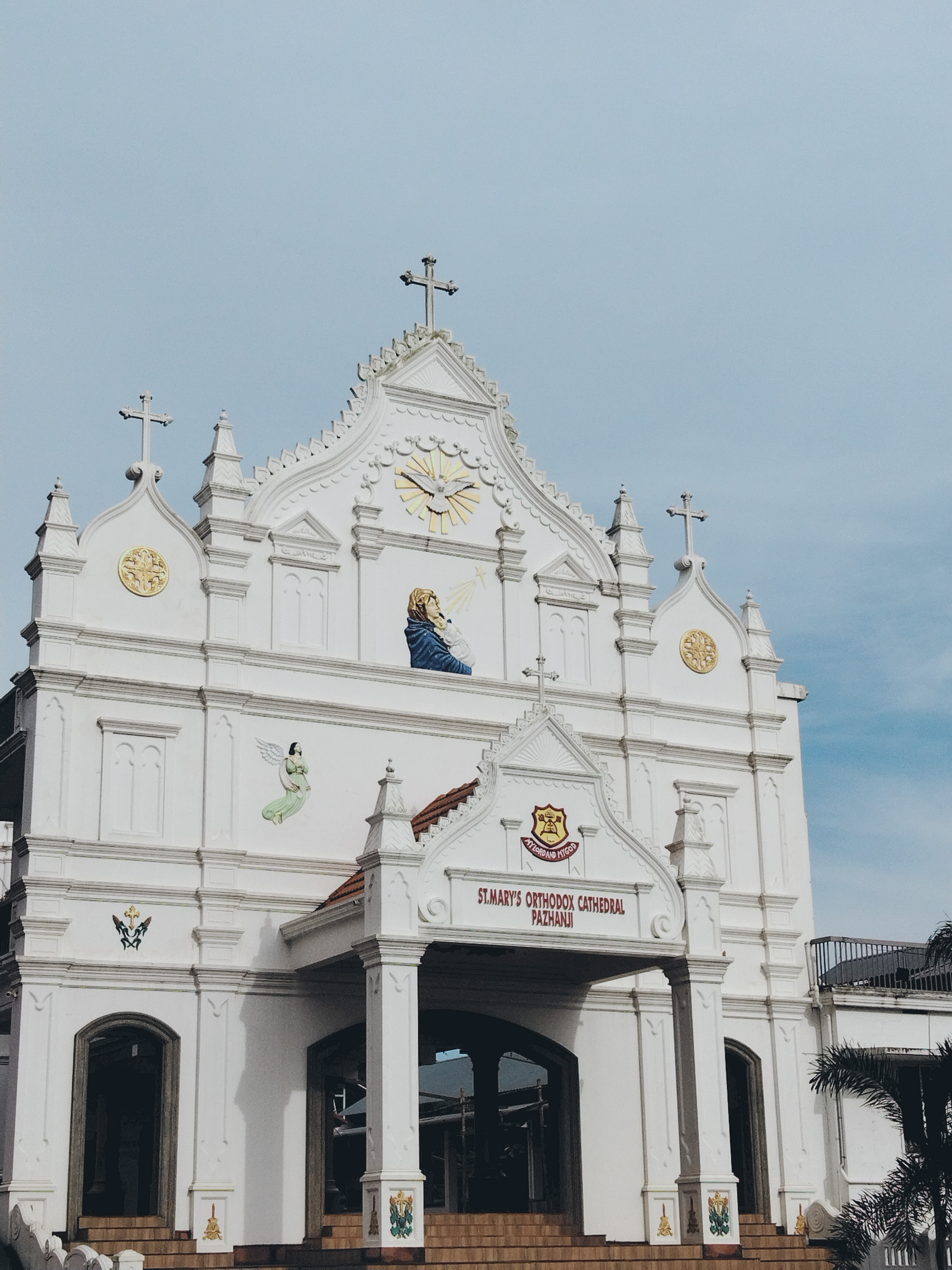
Pazhanji Martha Mariam Suriyanipally

- St. Mary's Orthodox Cathedral, Pazhanji – The Pazhanji church was constructed in the 4th century by the Saint Thomas Syrian Christian members of the Kunnamkulam Arthat Cathedral. Many Syrian Christians who fled Arthat at the time of the Mysorean invasion of Malabar in the 18th century joined the Pazhanji Syrian Church.
- Parappukara St John's Syro-Malabar Church – The Parappukkara Syrian Church was established in 400 by the Syrian Christians who migrated to Parappukkara from Kodungallur. It has ancient murals from the 10th century onwards.

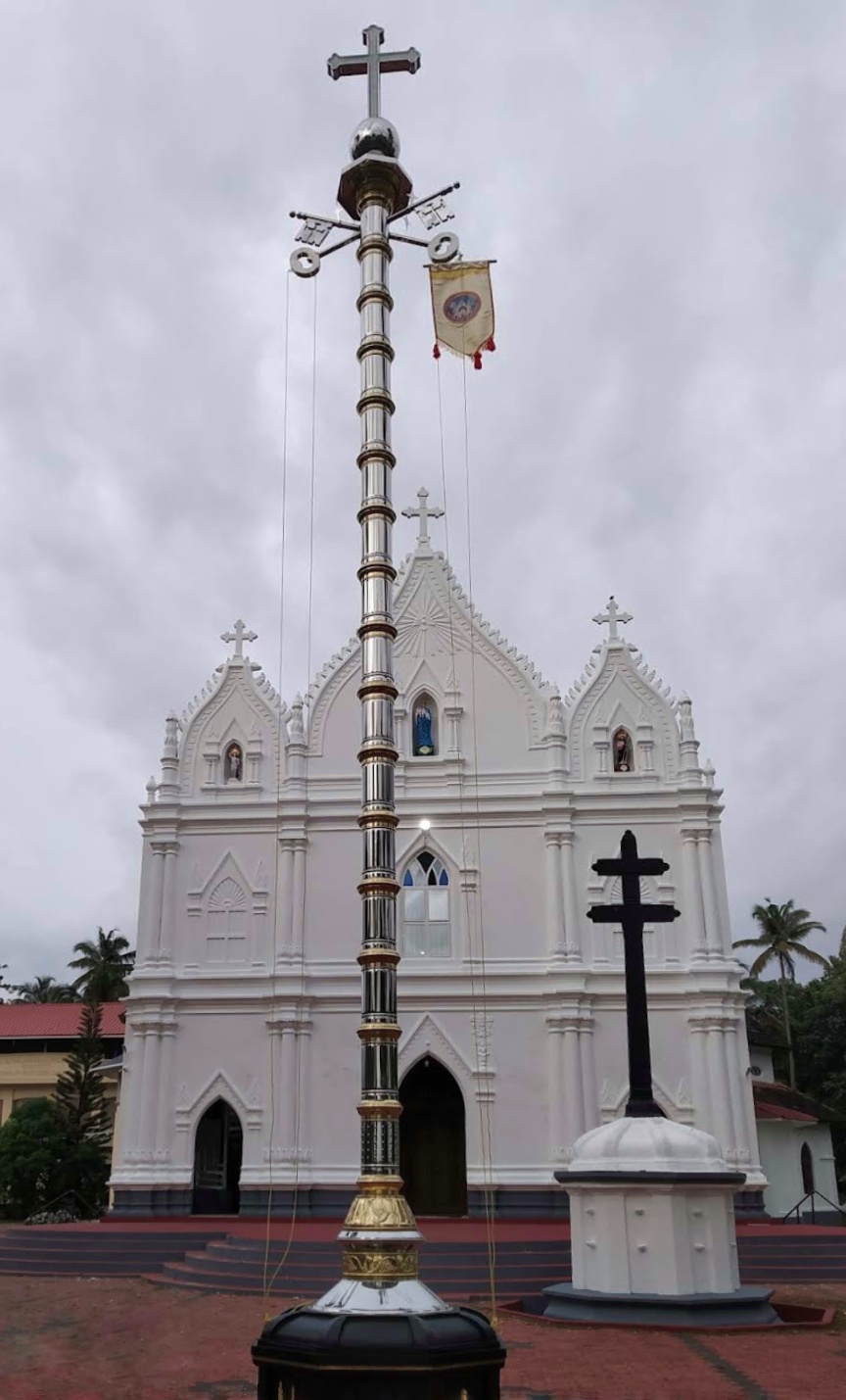
Puthenchira Martha Mariam Suriyanipally

- Puthenchira St Mary's Syro-Malabar Forane Church – The Puthenchira Syrian Church was established in 400 by the Syrian Christians of Puthenchira who migrated from Kodungallur due to conflict between local rulers.
- North Pudukkad Our Lady of Mount Carmel Syro-Malabar Church – The Mullassery church was established in 400. The church was established by the Syrian Christians who migrated to Puthukkad which lies on the fertile plains of Manali river.
- Enammavu Our Lady of Carmel Syro-Malabar Church – The Enammavu Church (Enammakkal Church) was established in 510 by the Syrian Christians who migrated from Palayoor. In the later centuries many Syrian Christians migrated from Enammavu to Thrissur as they were invited by Shakthan Thampuran for the development of trade and business in the town.
- Chalakudy St Mary's Syro-Malabar Forane Church – The church was constructed in 600 by the Syrian Christians of Chalakudy who had migrated from Kodungallur where Thomas the Apsotle had converted them to Christianity. The Syrian Christians of Chalakudy attended the Ambazhakkad Syrian Church till the establishment of the Chalakudy Syrian Church. The Kodassery Karthakkal helped in the reconstruction of the Chalakudy Syrian Church several times
- Velayanad St Mary's Syro-Malabar Old Church – Established in the 9th century by the Syrian Christians of Velayanad who formerly attended the nearby Pazhuviland Puthenchira Syrian Church. The church was partially demolished by Tipu Sultan during the Mysorean invasion of Malabar in 1790.

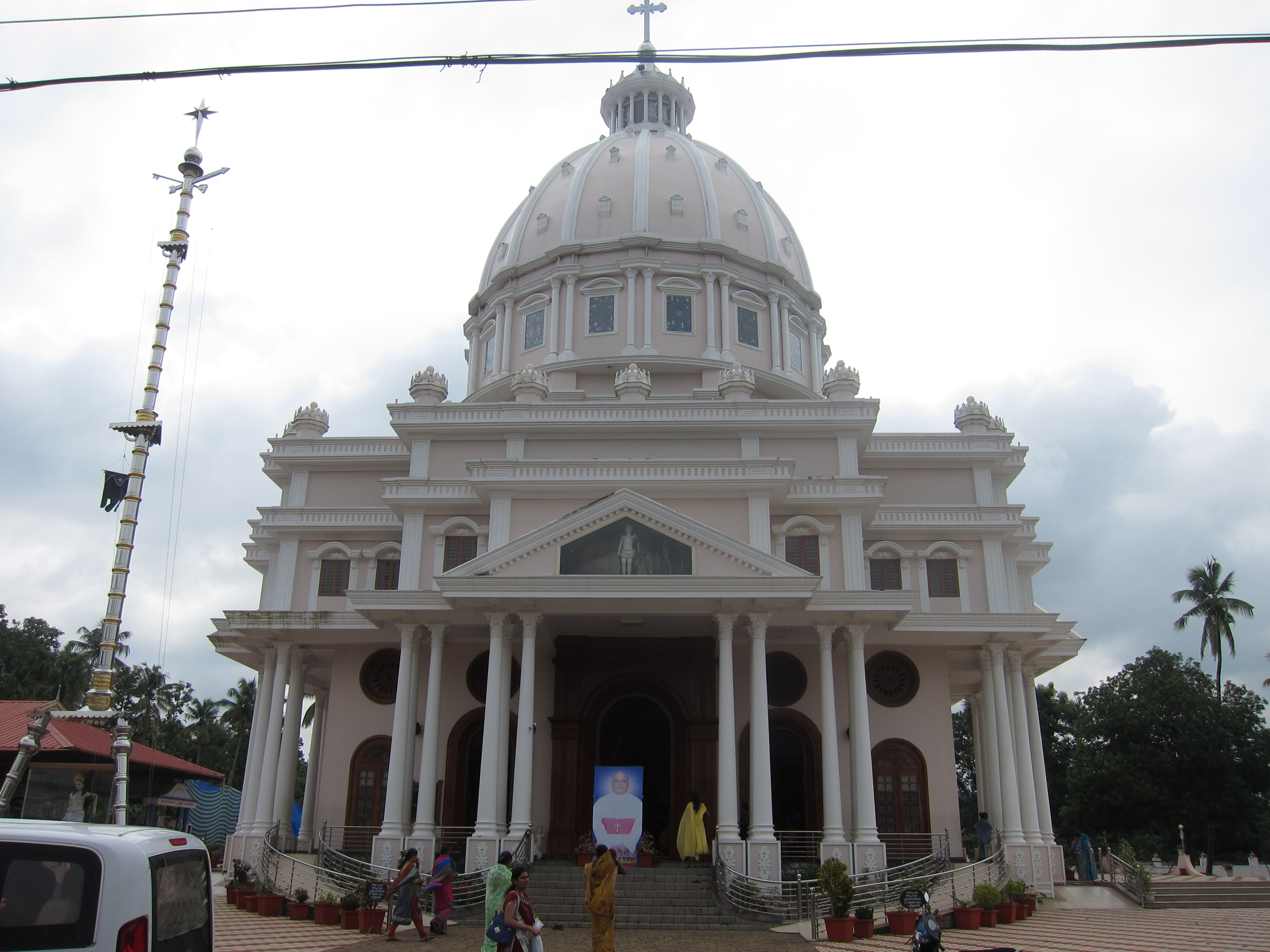
Thazhekad Martha Mariam Suriyanipally

- Thazhekkad St Sebastian's Syro-Malabar Church – The Thazhekkad Syrian Church was established in the 10th century. It has hosted the notable Thazhekkad Sasanam where many privileges and grants where given to the Syrian Christians. The Syrian Christian community was primarily under the jurisdiction of Ambazhakad and later under the parish of Marth Mariam church, Velayanad.
- Arimbur St Anthony's Syro-Malabar Church – The Arimpur Syrian Church was established in the 9th century by the Syrian Christians who migrated from Enamavu who formerly attended the Enammavu Syrian Church.

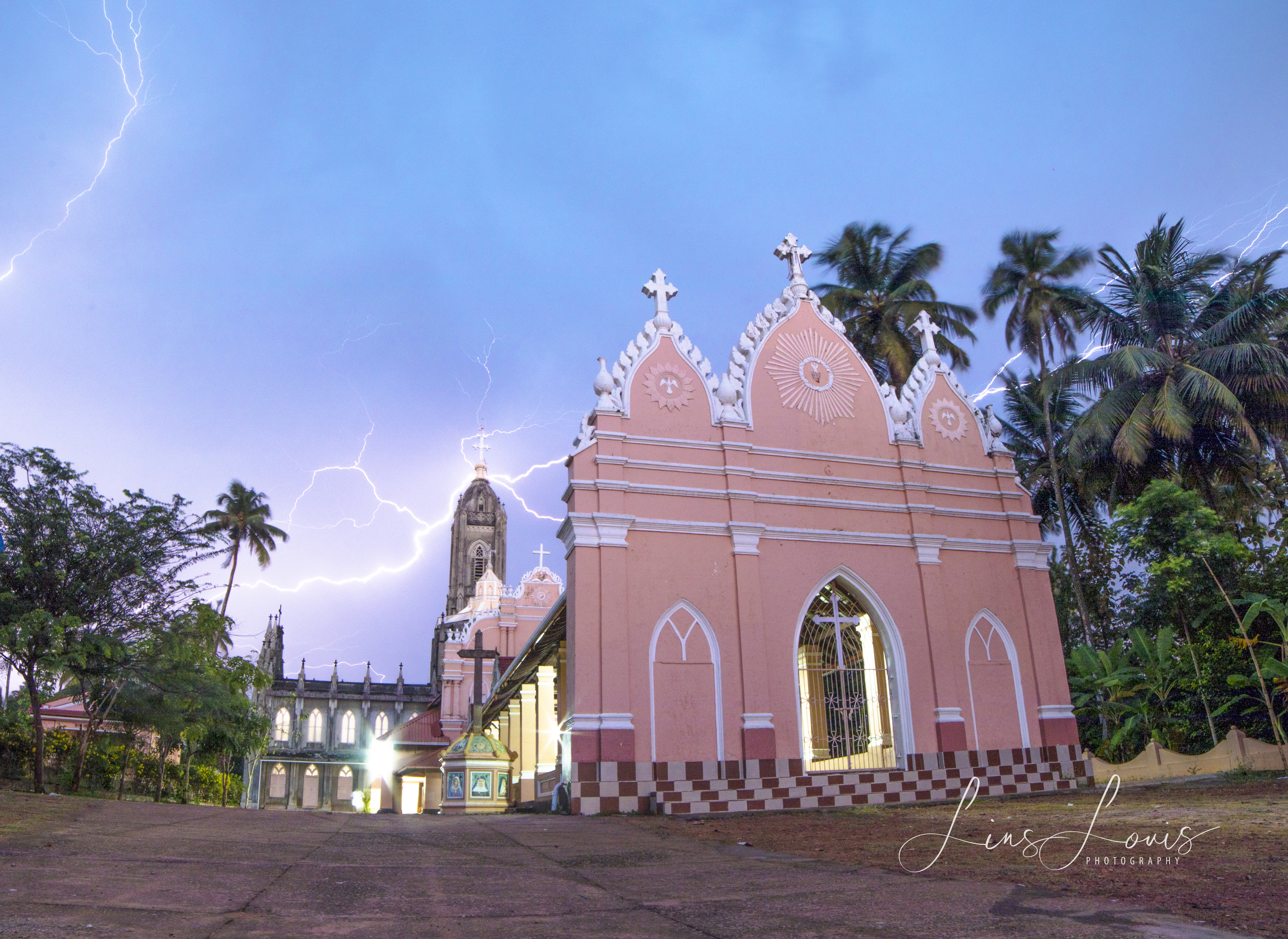
Pazhuvil Martha Mariam Suriyanipally

- Pazhuvil St Anthony's Syro-Malabar Church – It was founded in 883. This church is one of the famous pilgrimage centers in Kerala. It is renowned for the feast of St. Joseph on 19 March. The origin of Thattil family in Thrissur is linked with one of the army Chief of The King of Kochi. He was killed in a battle with Zamorin of Kozhikode at Enammavu in Thrissur. As a mark of respect and memory of this great warrior, King promised to construct a church, where his body is buried. The Syrian Christians of Pazhuvil attended the Ennamavu Syrian Church before the establishment of the Pazhuvil Syrian Church in 883 AD.

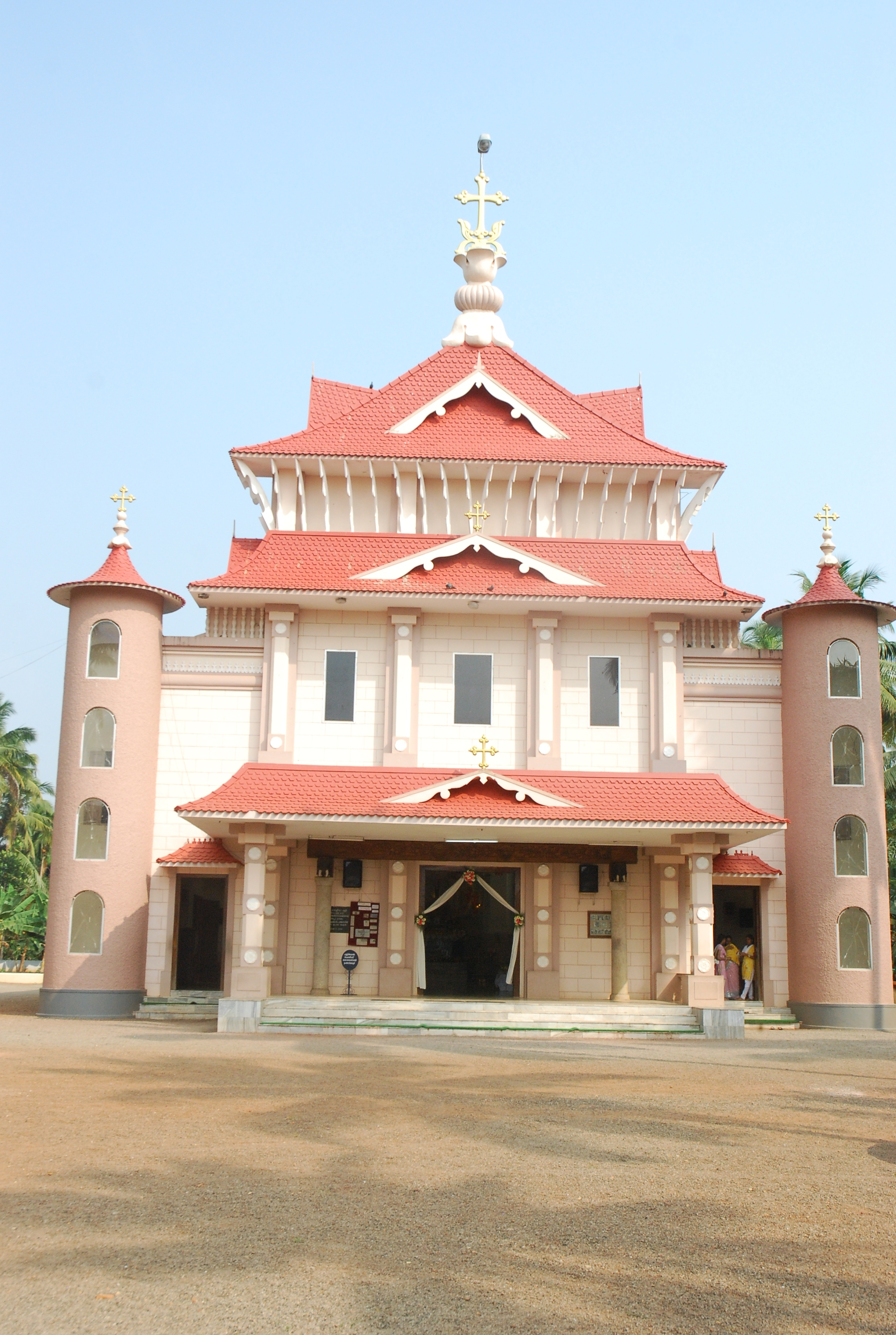
Mapranam Mar Sleeva Suriyanipally

- Mapranam Mar Sleeva Syro-Malabar Church – Believed to have been constructed in 928 AD by the Syrian Christians of Mapranam who were the former parishioners of the Kodungallur and Parappukkara Syrian Church.
- Kottekkad St Mary's Syro-Malabar Forane Church – The Kottekkad Syrian Church was established in 977 by the Cherman Perumal and the local Syrian Christians who migrated from Palayoor.
- Chavakkad Chittattukara St Sebastian's Syro-Malabar Church – The Chavakkad Chittattukara church was built in the 12th century by Saint Thomas Syrian Christians of Chavakkad by the Syrian Christians who separated from the Palayur Church.

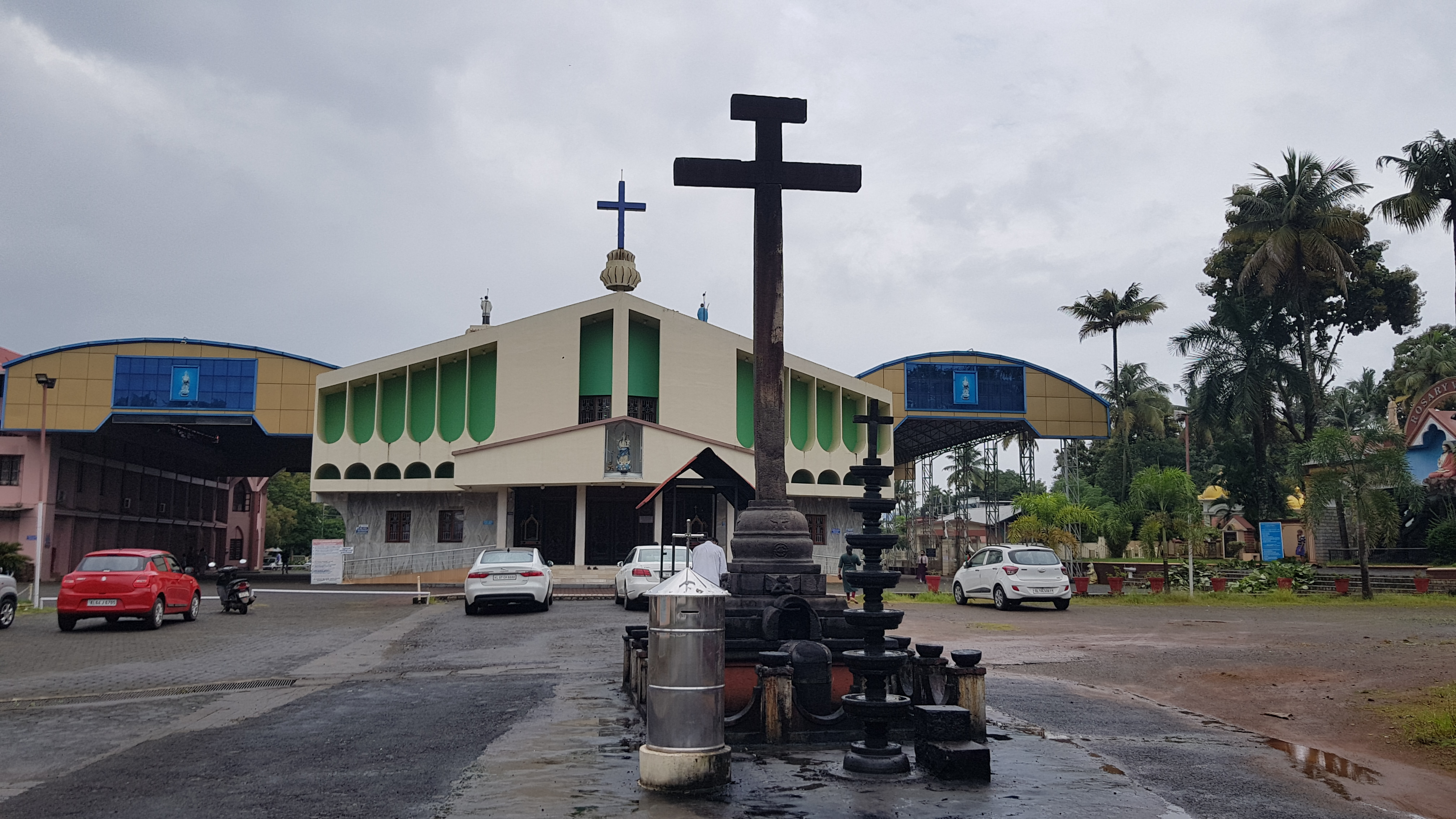
Koratty Martha Mariam Suriyanipally

- Koratty St Mary's Syro-Malabar Church – The Thampuratty of the Koratty Kartha constructed a church near the burial place of her chief commander, for the spiritual needs of the Syrian Christians living in that region. Construction work began on 15 August 1381 and was completed with the consecration on 8 September 1382. This church came to be known as the Marian Pilgrim Centre of Koratty Muthy. Ambazhakad Church was the parish for the Syrian Christians of Koratty before the establishment of Koratty church.
- Kottapadi St Lazar's Syro-Malabar Church – The Kottapadi Syrian Church was established in 1400 by the Punnathur Rajah (a vassal of the Zamorin) for Syrian Christian coconut traders brought from nearby areas like Kunnamkulam and Arthat.

== Ernakulam district ==
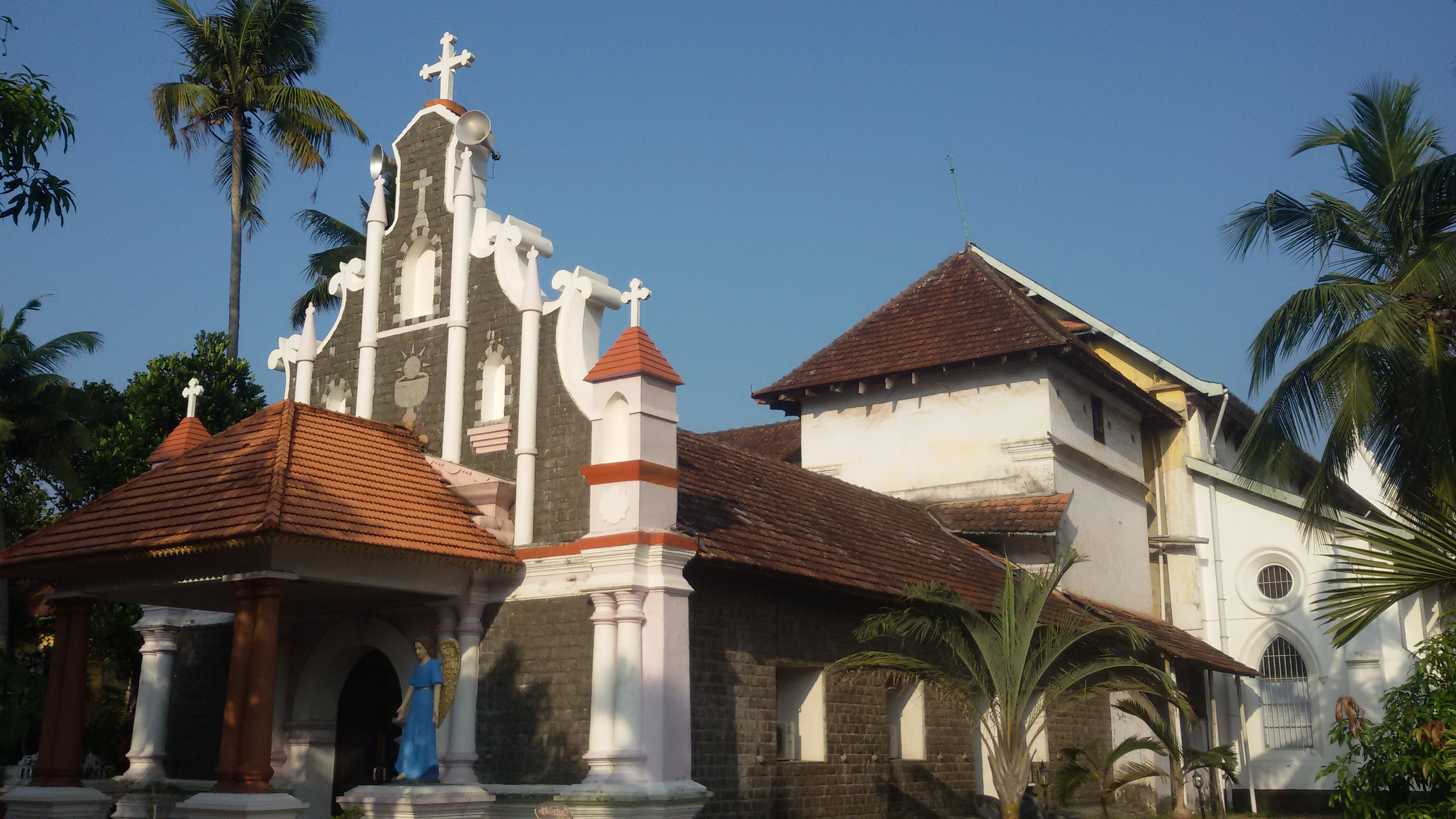
Kottakkavu Mar Thoma Sleeha Suriyanipally

- Kottakavu Mar Thoma Syro-Malabar Church North Parvoor – The Kottakavu Syrian Church was established by Thomas the Apsotle in 52 AD. It is one of the oldest churches in India and is among the Ezharappallikal. Many Syrian Christian migrations happened from North Paravur to places like Angamaly, Kothamangalam, Edappally, Udayamperoor, Thodupuzhaetc.

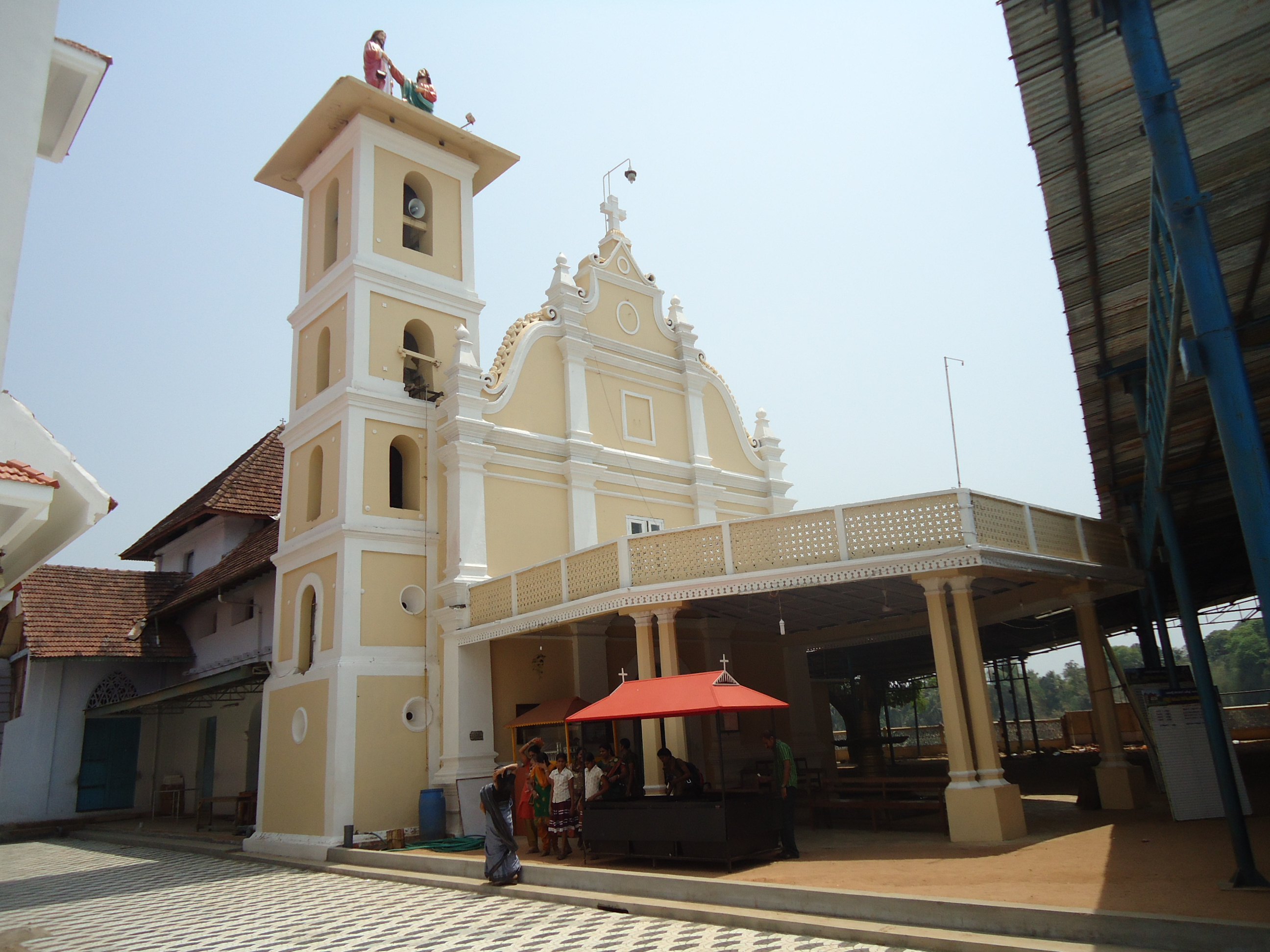
Malayattoor Mar Thoma Sleeha Suriyanipally

- Malayattoor St Thomas Syro-Malabar Church – Believed to be established as a cross in 60 AD by Thomas the Apostle.

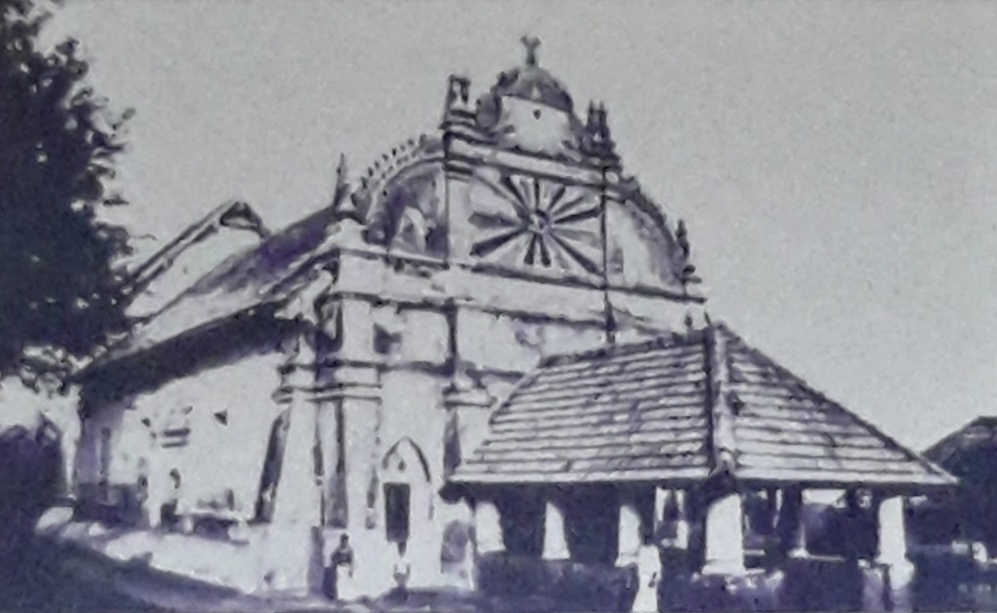
Kothamangalam Marth Mariam Valiyapally

- Kothamangalam St Mary's Jacobite Syrian Cathedral – The Kothamanagalam Valiyapally was founded on the 4th century by some Syrian Christian families who migrated from North Paravur, Edappally and Angamaly. The new church established in 1338 by four Syrian Christian merchants who bought the entire land of Kothamangalam from a local chief for commodity trading with the nearby state of Tamil Nadu.

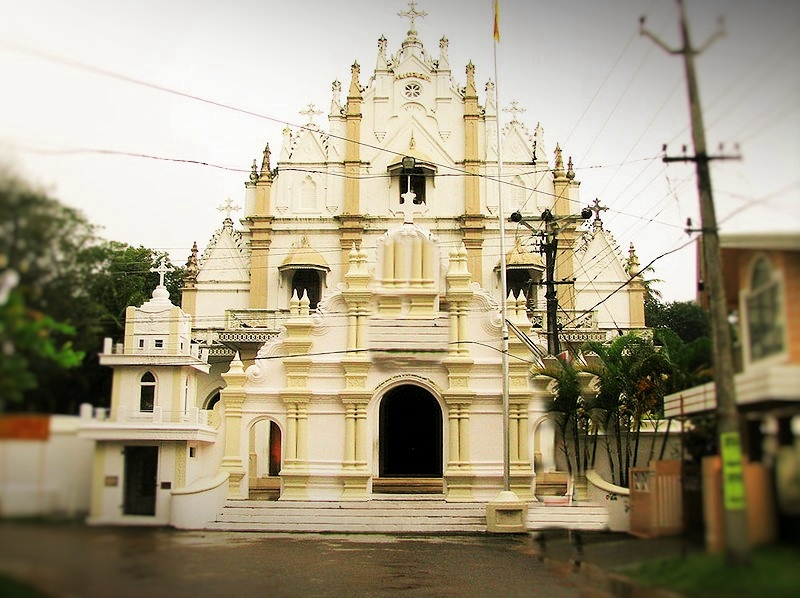
Kandanad Marth Mariam Suriyanipally

- Kandanad St Mary's Orthodox Syrian Cathedral – Kandanad Valiyapally is a prominent church in the Kandanad village of Ernakulam District of Kerala. This church is believed to have been built around the 4th century, belongs to Kandanad West Diocese of Malankara Orthodox Syrian Church. The migrants from North Paravur had built the Kandanad Syrian Church.

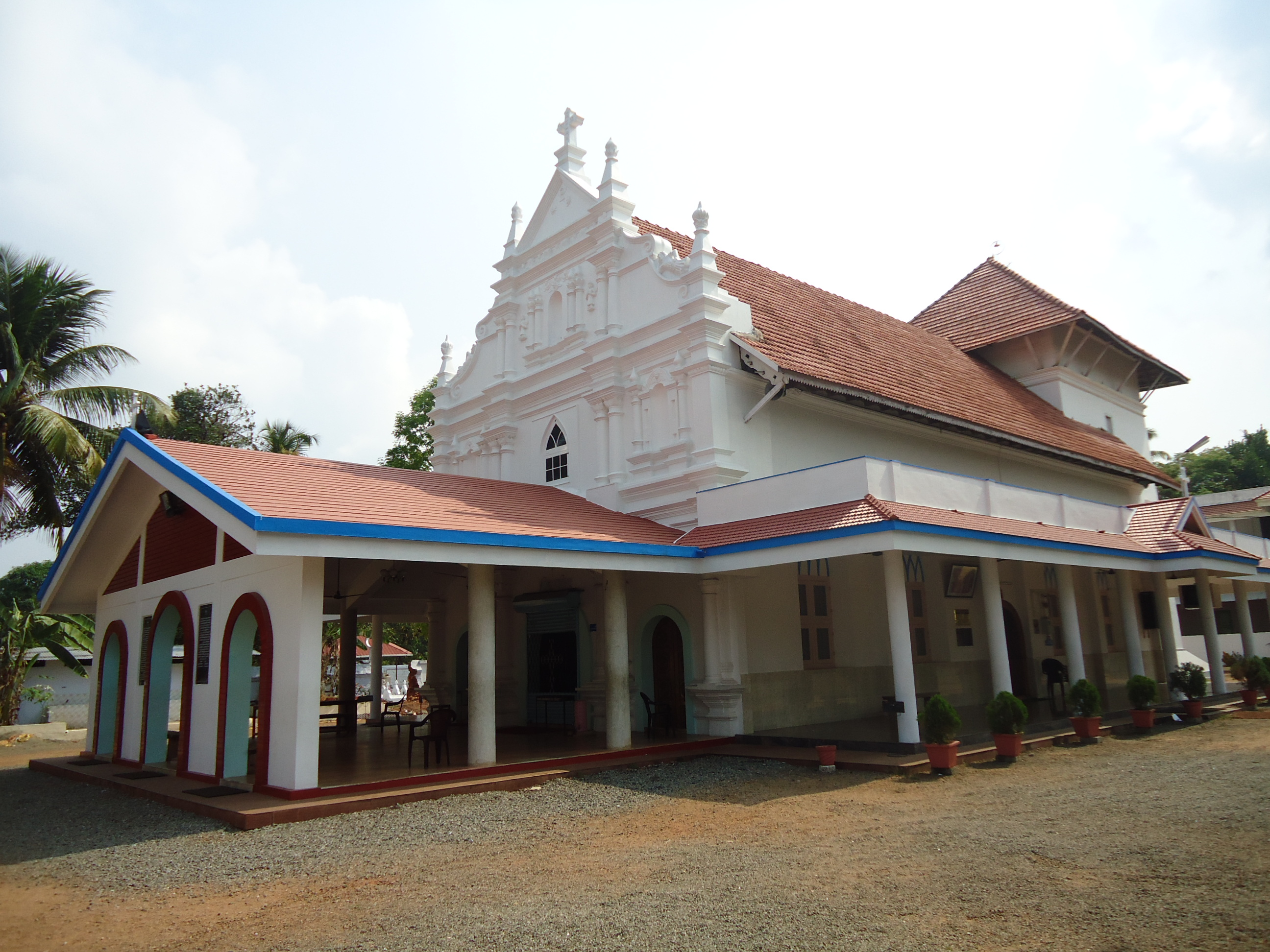
Angamaly Marth Mariam Suriyanipally

- Angamaly St Mary's Soonoro Cathedral – The Angamaly St Mary's Soonoro Jacobite Syriac Church was established in 409 AD by th Syrian Christians who migrated to Angamaly from Kodungallur. Later in the following centuries several waves of Syrian Christian migration happened into Angamaly.
- Angamaly St George's Syro-Malabar Basilica – Established in 430 by the Syrian Christian migrants from Kodungallur and North Paravur to Angamaly. Eventually the majority of Syrian Christians of Kodungallur had migrated to Angamaly in several waves of migrations due to wars between rivals and the great flood of 1381 AD.

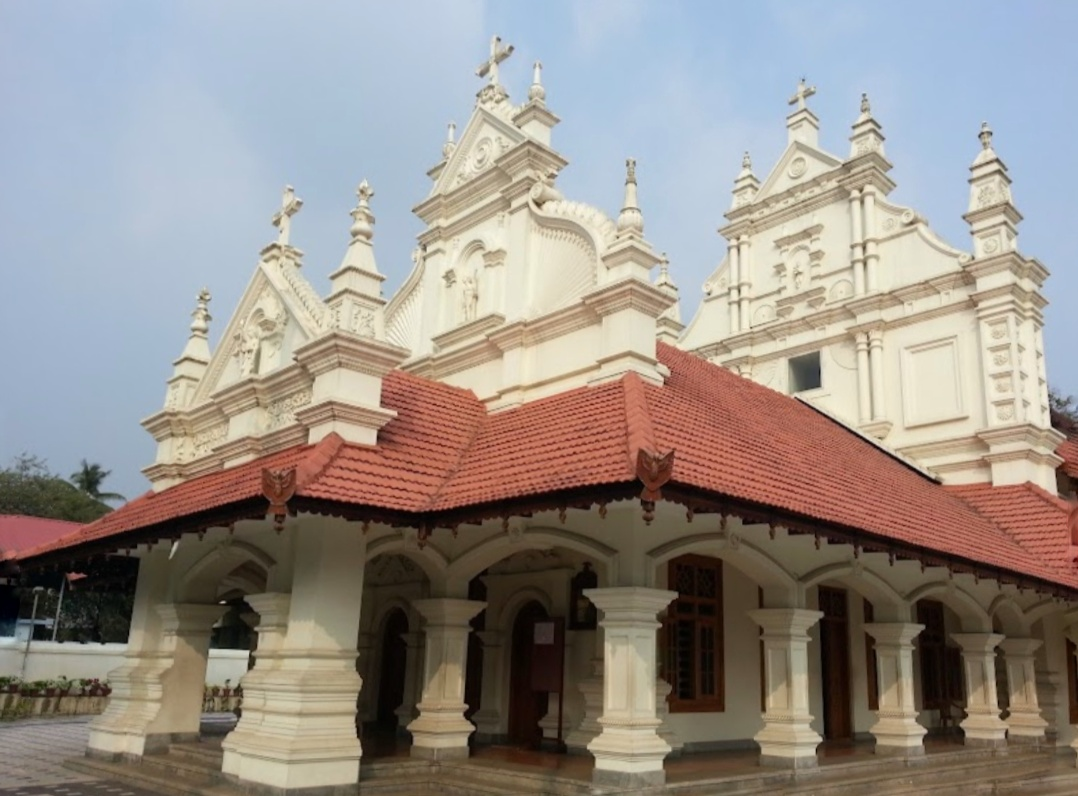
Angamaly Mar Hormidz Suriyanipally

- Angamaly Mar Hormizd Syro-Malabar Cathedral – It was built in 480 AD by the Syrian Christian migrants from Kodungallur. The tomb of Mar Abraham of Angamaly, the last Chaldean Metropolitan to reach Malabar Coast in AD 1570 is situated in this church.
- Kottoor St. George Orthodox Syrian Church – The Kottoor Church is believed to be founded in 5th century as a chapel of Pallippuram Church near Cherthala in the initial periods, later became a parish of the Kolenchery Syrian Church.

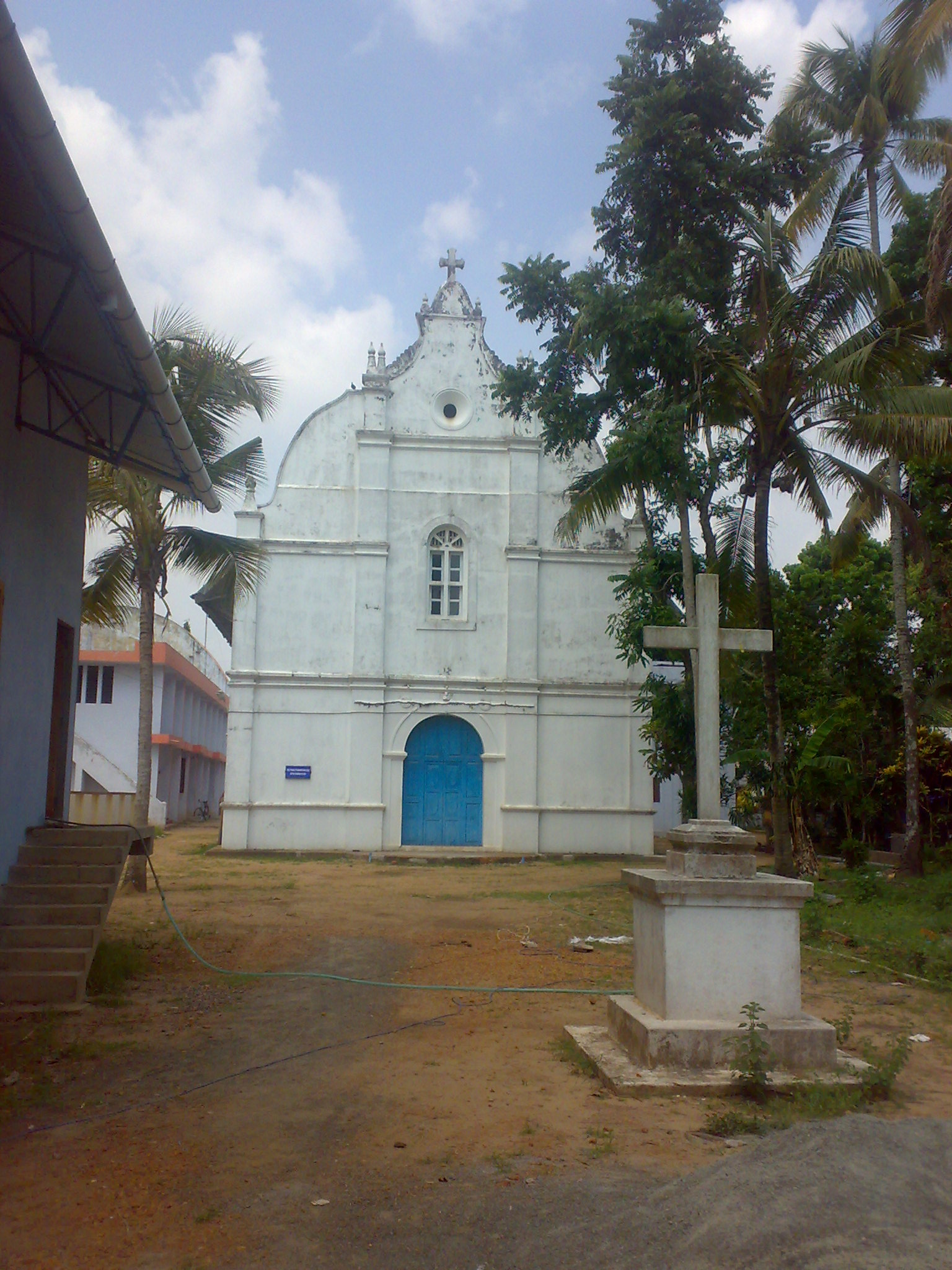
Udayamperoor Mar Sabor Mar Aphroth Kadeesha Suriyanipally

- Udayamperoor Synod of Diamper Syro-Malabar Church – Consecrated in 510 AD by the Syrian Christians who migrated from Kodungallur, the Udayamperoor church hosted the Synod of Diamper in 1599.

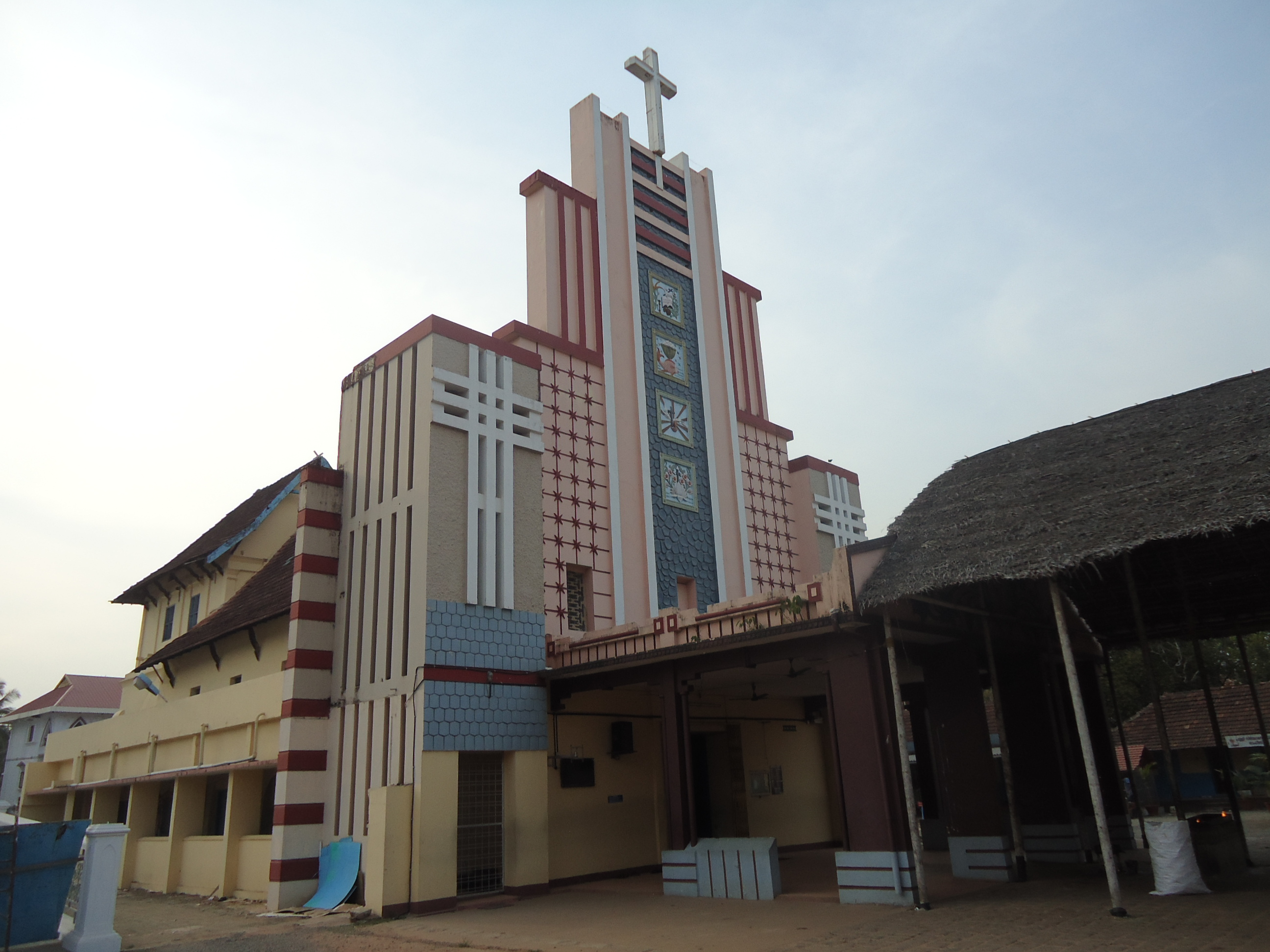
Edappally Mar Geevarghese Sahadha Suriyanipally

- Edappally St George's Syro-Malabar Forane Church – The church is thought to have been founded in 593 AD. It is regarded as one of the oldest churches in Kerala, after the seven churches founded by Thomas the Apostle in the first century. It was built by families from Paravur who had to travel to the Kottakkavu Mar Thoma Syro-Malabar Church, North Paravur to worship.

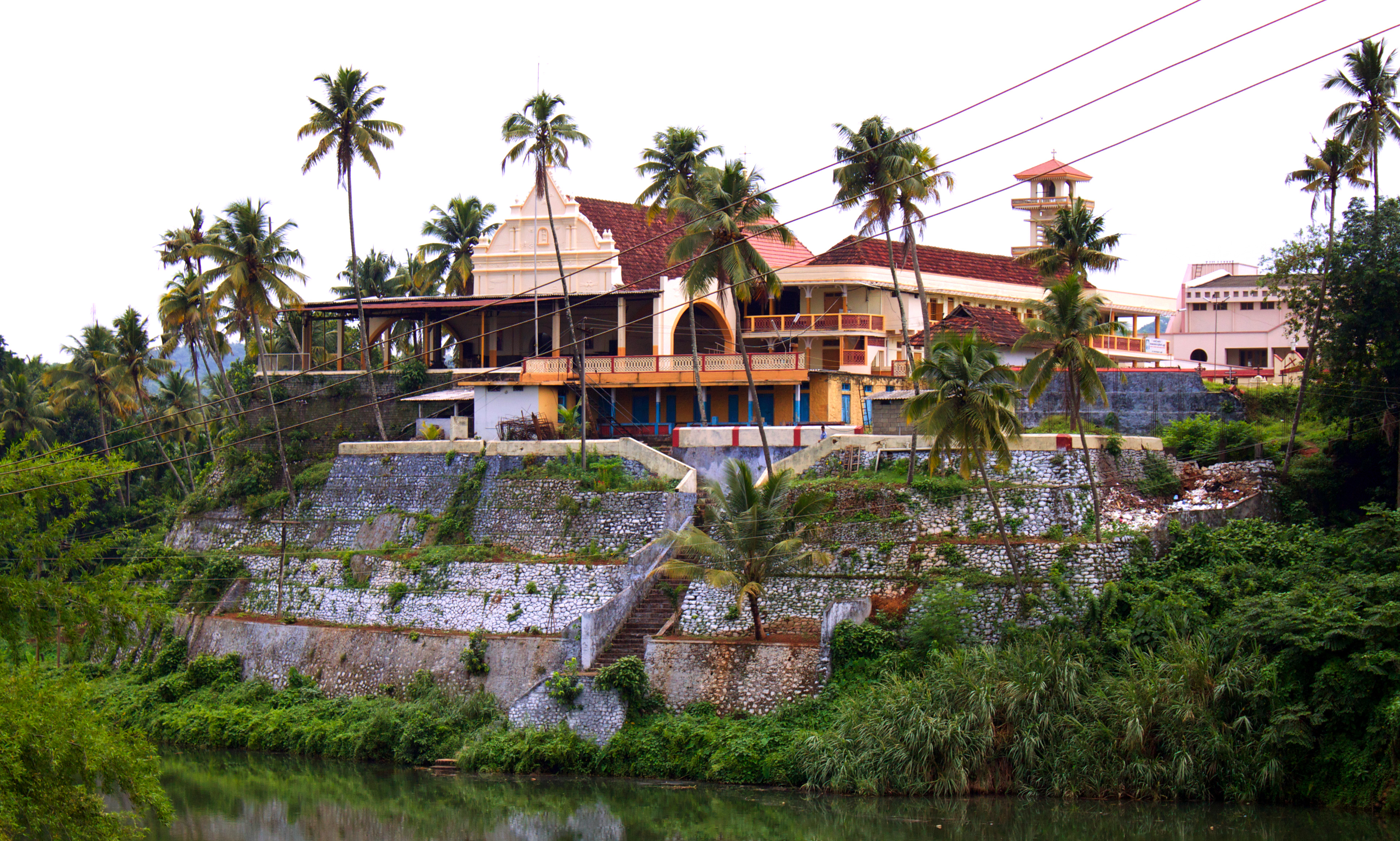
Piravom Marth Mariam Suriyanipally

- Piravom St Mary's Orthodox Cathedral – The Piravom Syrian Cathedral was consecrated in the 6th century and is dedicated to the Holy Magi, St. Mary, St. Peter, St. Paul and St. George. One among the three Biblical Magi was from India and was a member of the Chalissery Karthakal, a feudal Nair family from Piravom, Kerala, India. After returning to India, the scholar made a temple with the idol of Mary and infant Jesus and named the idol as "Bala Karthyayani" and kept it besides other Hindu deities. Later in the 5th century when the Saint Thomas Syrian Christian community was firmly established the temple was reconstructed as the Piravom Syrian Church. Later many Syrian Christian migrations happened in the following centuries from North Paravur and Pallippuram to Piravom.
- Moozhikkulam St Mary's Syro-Malabar Forane Church – Established in 601 AD by the Syrian Christians who migrated from Kodungallur and by those who separated from the Angamaly Old Syrian Church.

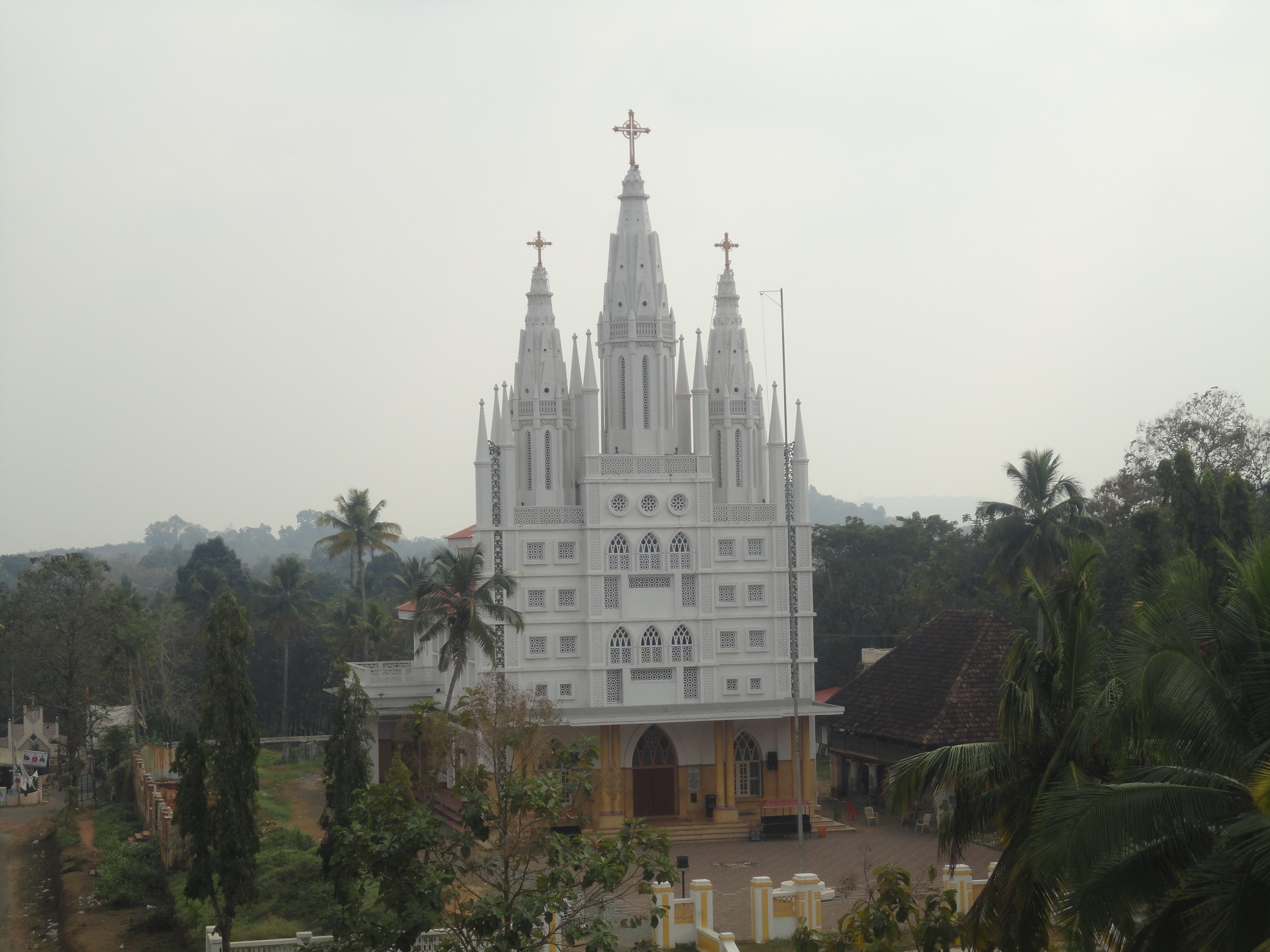
Kolenchery Mar Pathrose Paulose Sleeha Suriyanipally

- Kolenchery St Peter's and St Paul's Orthodox Syrian Church – St. Peter's and St. Paul's Orthodox Syrian Church is a church in Kolenchery, in Ernakulam, Kerala, India. It was established in the 9th century by Thankan Mappila of the Kolenchery family. Before the Kolenchery church was established the Syrian Christians of Kolenchery attended the Kottoor Syrian Church and Piravom Church.

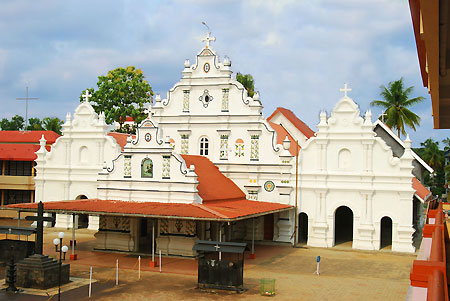
Karingachira Mar Geevarghese Sahadha Suriyanipally

- Karingachira St George's Jacobite Syrian Cathedral – Karingachira St. George's Jacobite Syrian Church of Jacobite Syrian Christian Church, established in 722 AD (Makaram 13) by the Syrian Christians of Edappally Church who had migrated to Karingachira-Tripunithura in the 8th century. The Maliackel and the Palathinkal families had built the Karingachira Church.
- South Paravur St John the Baptist Syro-Malabar Church – The South Paravur church was established in 802 by the Syrian Christians of South Paravur who separated from the Udayamperoor Syrian Church.

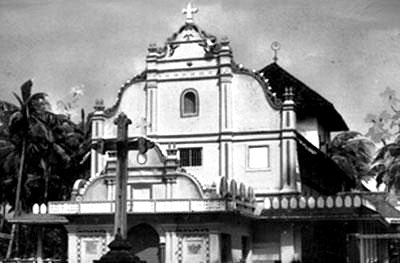
Akaparambu Mar Sabor Mar Aphroth Kadeesha Suriyanipally

- Akaparambu Mar Sabor and Mar Proth Church – Completed in 825 AD, the church was established by Mar Sabor and Mar Afroth who were two holy men who came to Malabar to preach the Gospel with a group of Assyrian Christian (Nestorians) immigrants led by a merchant named Sapor Esho.

Kadamattom Mar Geevarghese Sahadha Suriyanipally

- Kadamattom St George's Orthodox Syrian Church – The church is believed to have been established in the 9th century by Mar Sabor. A 9th-century stone Persian cross with four equal-size arms sits on the right wall of the Madbha or altar room. The arms are tipped with floral designs and is claimed to have been made by Mar Sabor. Around the cross is engraved a Pahlavi inscription. The Syrian Christians of Kadamattom attended the Piravom church for worship before the establishment of this church.

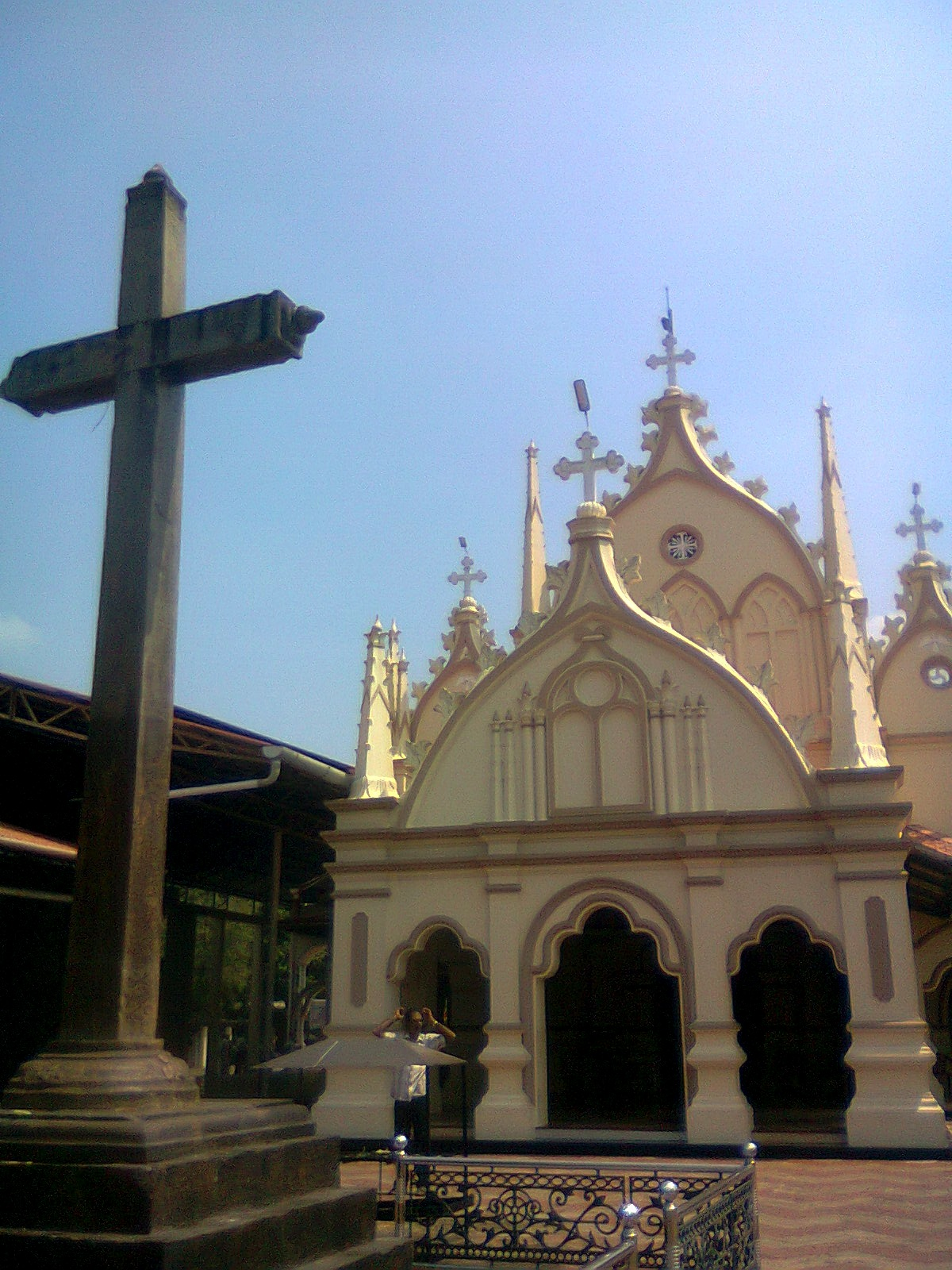
Pallikkara Morakkala Marth Mariam Suriyanipally

- Morakkala St Mary's Jacobite Syrian Cathedral, Pallikkara – The Morakkala St Mary's Jacobite Syrian Cathedral, Pallikara was established in 905 AD by the Syrian Christians of Morakkala and Pallikkara who were parishioners of the Edappally Syrian Church.

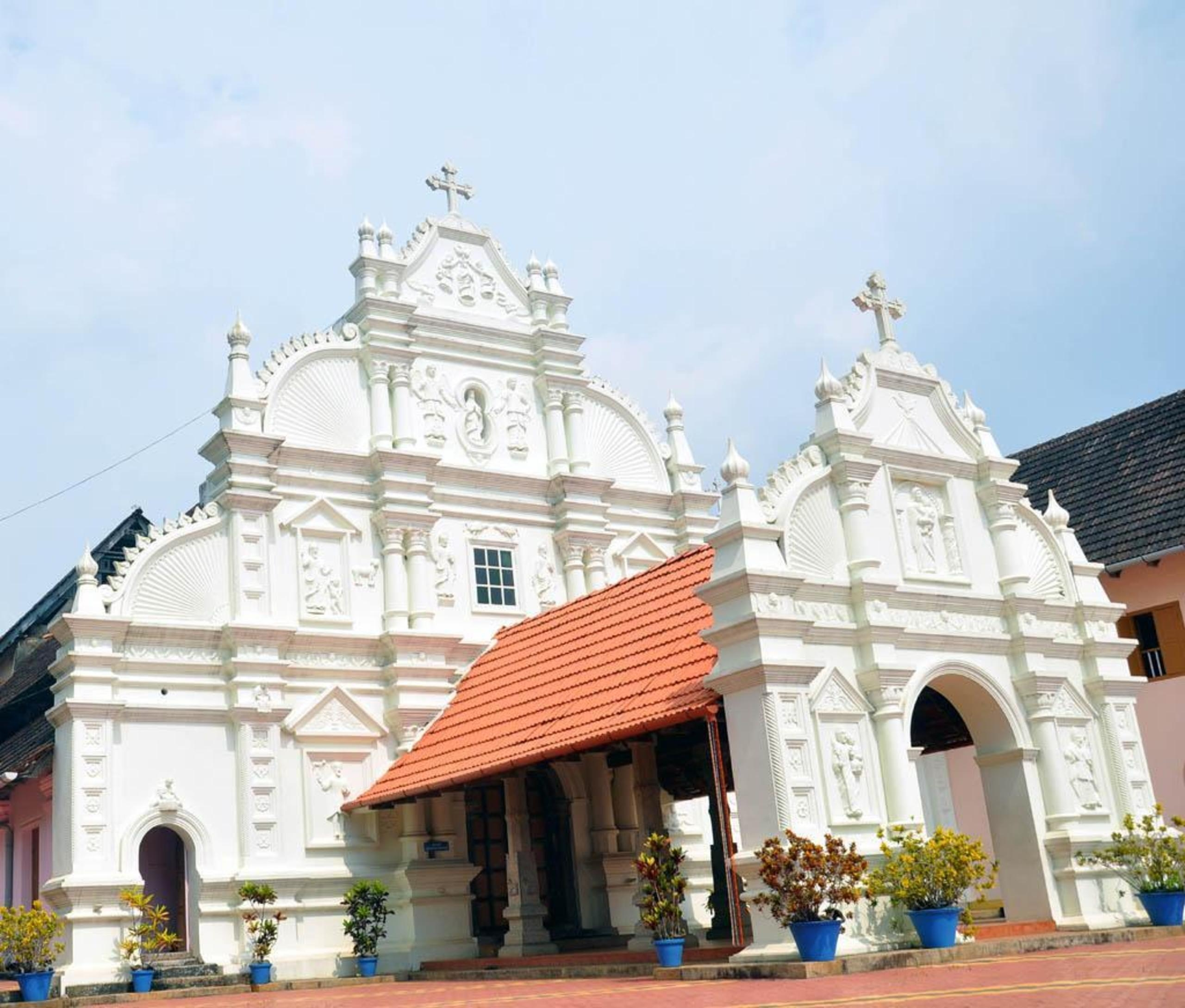
Arakuzha Marth Mariam Suriyanipally

- Arakuzha Saint Mary's Syro-Malabar Major Archiepiscopal Church – The Arakuzha Syrian Church is an ancient Syrian Catholic Church which was built by the local jenmi, Prathipally Karthakal for the 1000 Syrian Christian families of Arakuzha in 999 AD for those who separated from the Mylacombu Syrian Church.

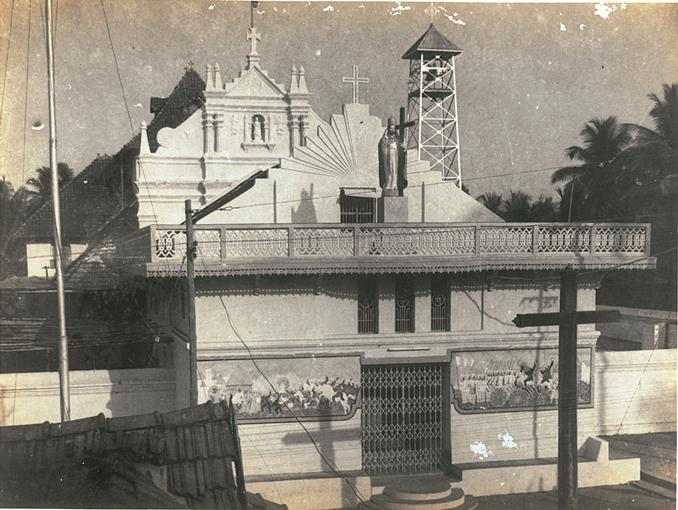
Kanjur Marth Mariam Suriyanipally

- Kanjur St Mary's Forane Syro-Malabar Church – Built in 1001, this church is portrayed as the symbol of strong Christian faith and spiritual renaissance of Kanjoor. The Kanjoor Syrian Church was established by the Syrian Christians who migrated from Angamaly and Kodungallur.
- Chowara St Mary's Syro-Malabar Church, Aluva – The Chowara church was established in 1025 by the Syrian Christians traders and merchants who migrated from Kodungallur and Kottakavu (North Paravur).
- Chendamangalam Mar Sleeva Syro-Malabar Church – The Chendamangalam church was established in 1075 AD by the parishioners of Kottakkavu Syrian Church. This church has many ancient inscriptions and murals and is part of the Muziris heritage monuments.
- Koothattukulam Vadakara St John's Orthodox Syrian Church – St. John's church at Vadakara, Koothattukulam is one of the oldest Syrian Christian churches in Malankara. It was established in the 1096 by the Syrian Christians of Piravom Syrian Valiyapally.
- Ernakulam St Mary's Syro-Malabar Basilica – Also known as the Anchukaimal Pally, it was founded in 1112 AD by the Syrian Christians of Ernakulam who previously attended the Edappally Suriyani Church.
- Mulakulam Mor Ihidoyo Orthodox Syrian Church – The Mulakulam church was initially established as a chapel of the Piravom church in 1136 with the help of a Samanthan of the Vadakkumkoor Rajah. In 1566 it was reconstructed.
- Mamalassery Mar Michael Orthodox Syrian Church – The Mamalassery Syrian Church was established in the 12th century by the Syrian Christians who separated from the Piravom Syrian Church following a feud between them.

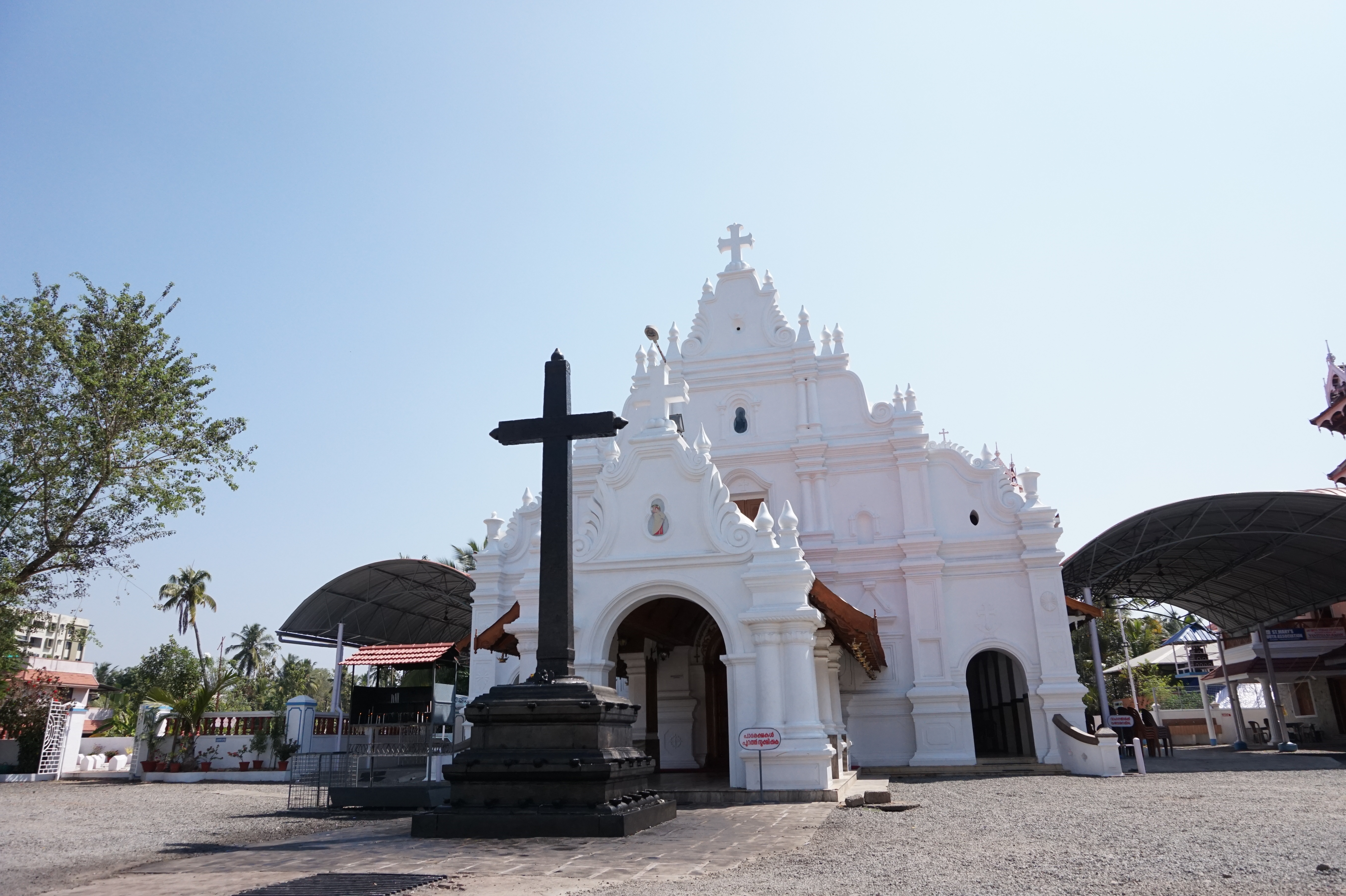
Nadamel Marth Mariam Suriyanipally

- Nadamel Marth Mariam Jacobite Syrian Church, Thrippunithura – Nadamel Marth Mariam Church was built in 1175 in Tripunithura, India by the former parishioners of the Karingachira Syrian Church. It belongs to the Malankara Jacobite Syriac Orthodox Church.
- Palluruthy St Mary's Syro-Malabar Church – The Palluruthy Syro-Malabar Church was established in 1191 by the Syrian Christians who migrated from Pallippuram in Alappuzha.It is popularly known as Suriyanipally as it is the first and only Syrian church in the area. It is one of the oldest church in kochi.

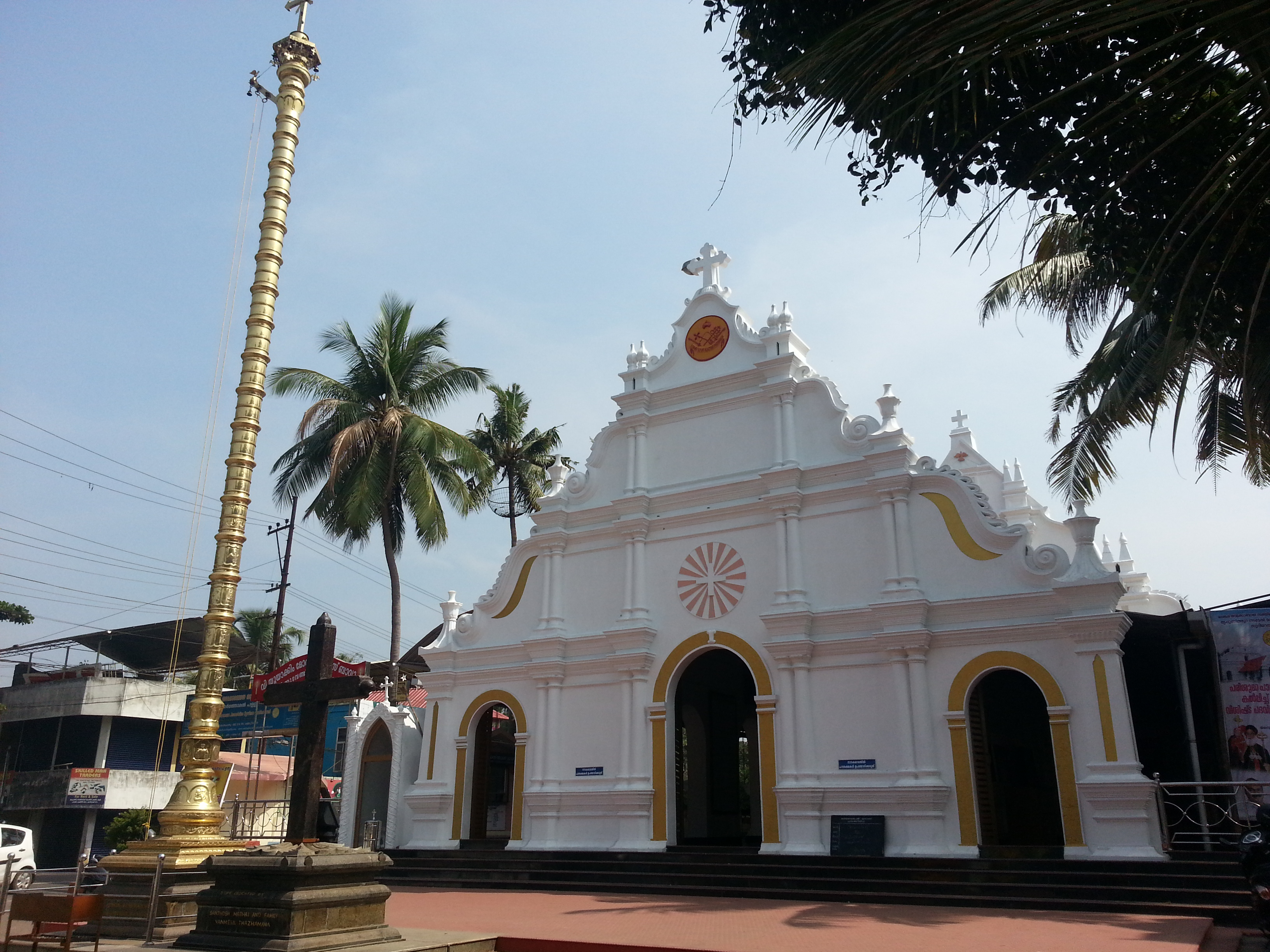
Mulanthuruthy Marth Mariam Suriyanipally

- Mulanthuruthy St Thomas Orthodox Syrian Cathedral – The church was established in 1225 (11th century) and modified in 16th century (in 1550) by the Knanaya Tharakan (minister) Kunchacko of the Kunnassery family. Due to an altercation between the Syrian Christians and the Kingdom of Vadakkumkur Kunchacko had gathered the Knanaya of St. Mary's Knanaya Valiyapally, Kaduthuruthy as well as all Syrian Christians he could find within Vadakkumkur and moved them to Mulanthuruthy. Upon arrival Kunchacko had sanctioned the building of the Mulanthuruthy Church. Later the Knanaya were called back to their home church of Kaduthuruthy by the descendants of the King of Vadakkumkur, leaving Mulanthuruthy Church in the care of the Syrian Christians who remained there.
- Karakunnam Morth Mariam Jacobite Syrian Cathedral – The Karakunnam Syrian Church was established in the 13th century by the Syrian Christians who separated from the Kadammattom Syrian Church.

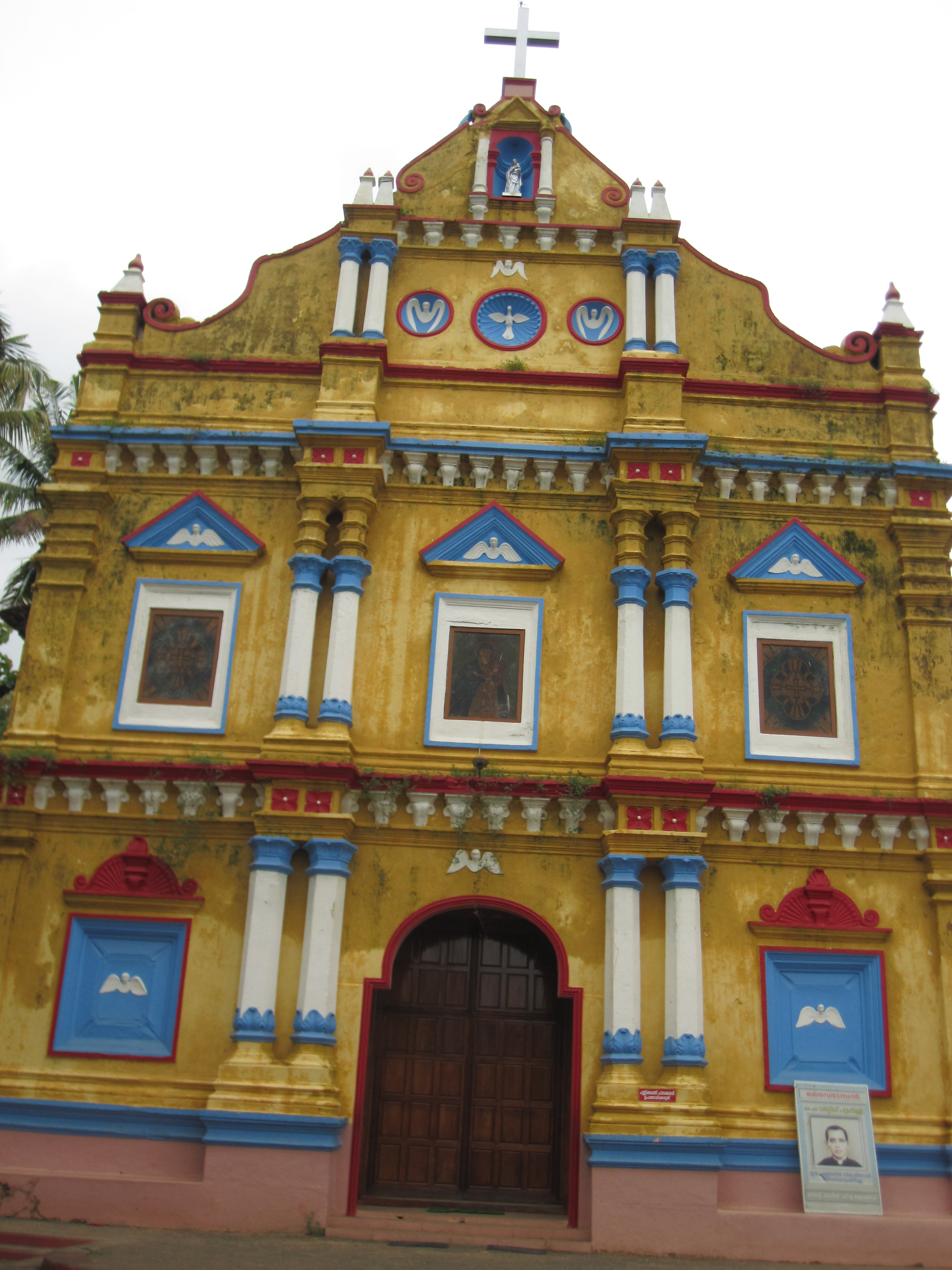
Alangad Marth Mariam Suriyanipally

- Alangad St Mary's Syro-Malabar Church – The Alangad church was established in 1300 by the Syrian Christians of Alangad and the Alangad Karthakal. The Syrian Christians of Alangad formerly attended the Kottakavu North Paravur Church.

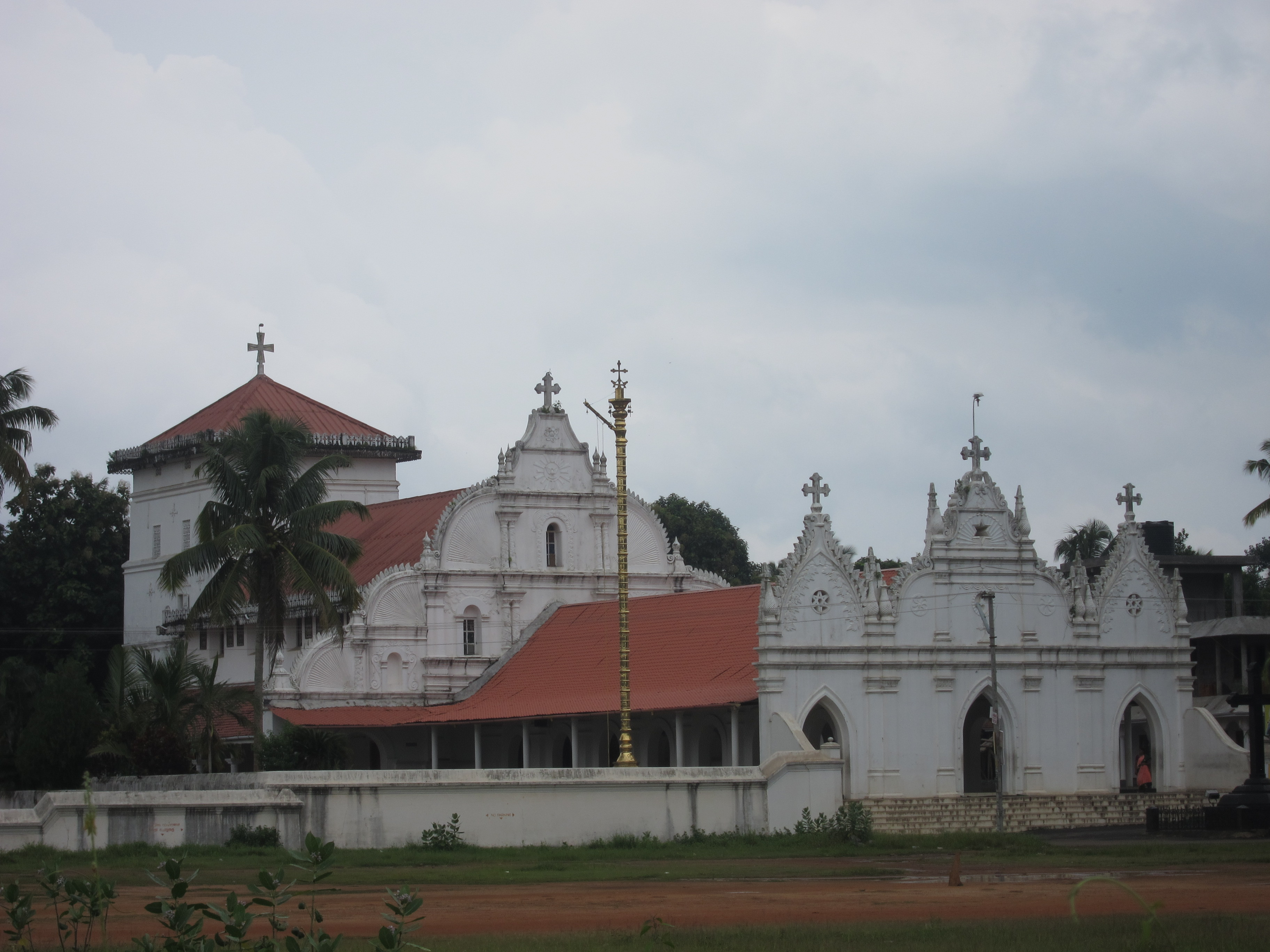
Kuruppampady Marth Mariam Suriyanipally

- Kuruppampady St Mary's Jacobite Syrian Cathedral – The Kuruppampady cathedral is one among the older churches of the Malankara Church in the Ernakulam district, Kerala. The church was established around 1300 by a group of Syrian Christian families who were members of the Kanjoor church residing at Kuruppampady.
- North Kuthiathode St Thomas Syro-Malabar Old Church – The North Kuthiathode Old Church was established in 1301 by the Syrian Christians who migrated from Kodungallur and North Paravur.

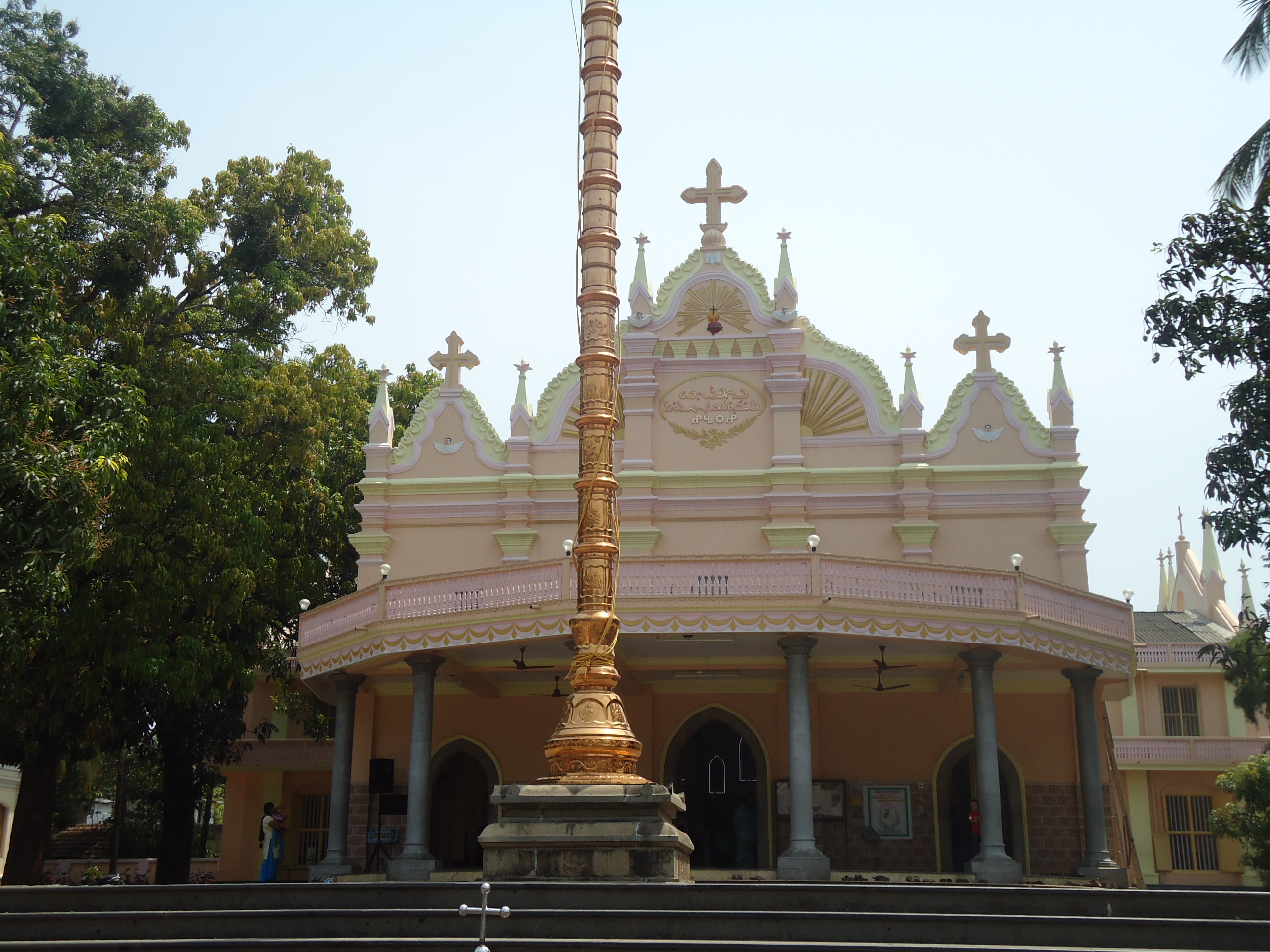
Manjapra Mar Sleeva Suriyanipally

- Manjapra Jacobite Syrian Church – Built in 1401 by the local Syrian Christians who separated from the Angamaly Old Church.

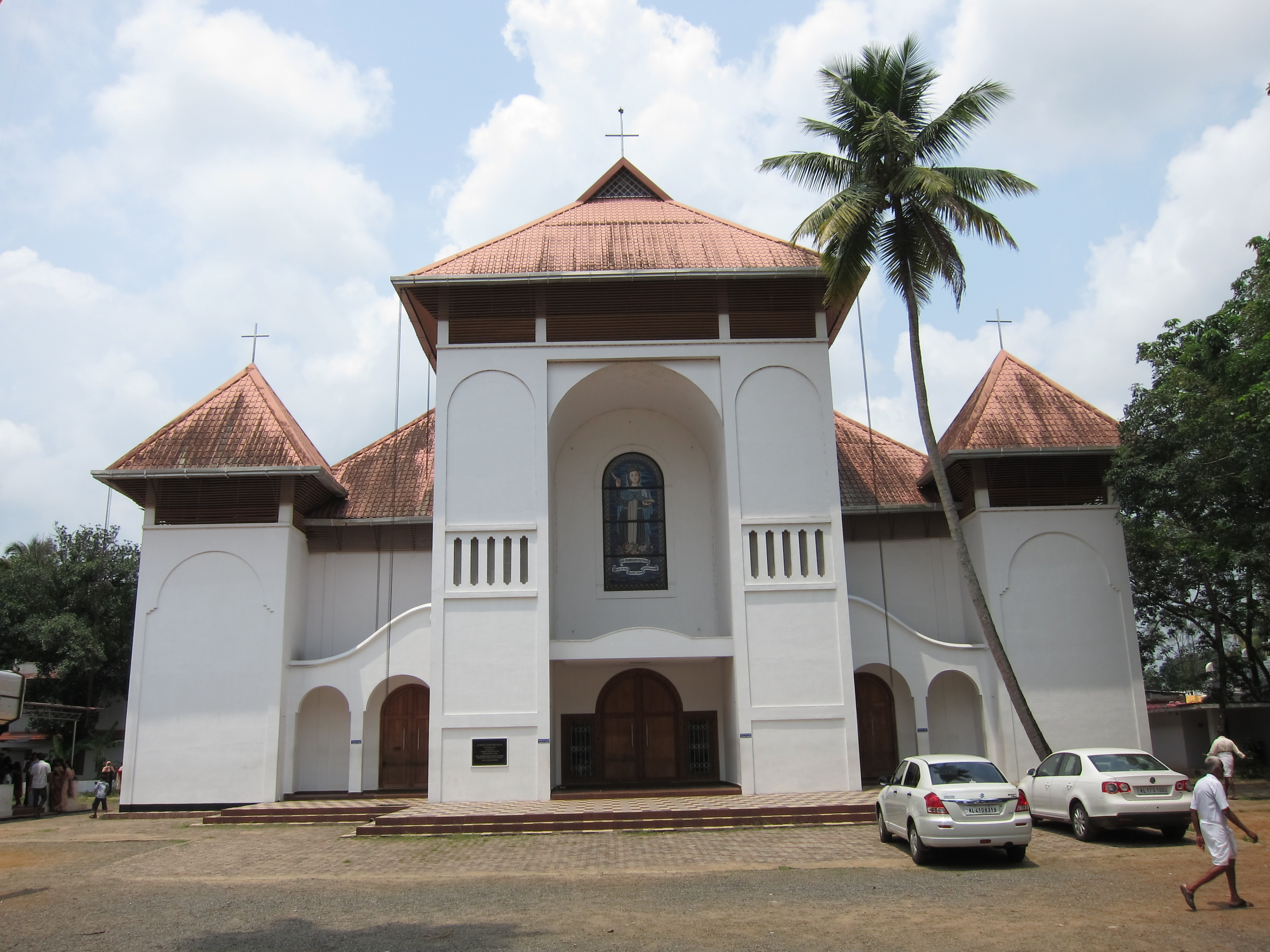
Vallam Marth Mariam Suriyanipally

- Vallom St Theresa's Syro-Malabar Church, Perumbavoor – The Vallom church was established in 1455 by the Syrian Christians of Vallom, Perumbavoor who formerly attended the Kanjur and Angamaly Syrian churches for worship.

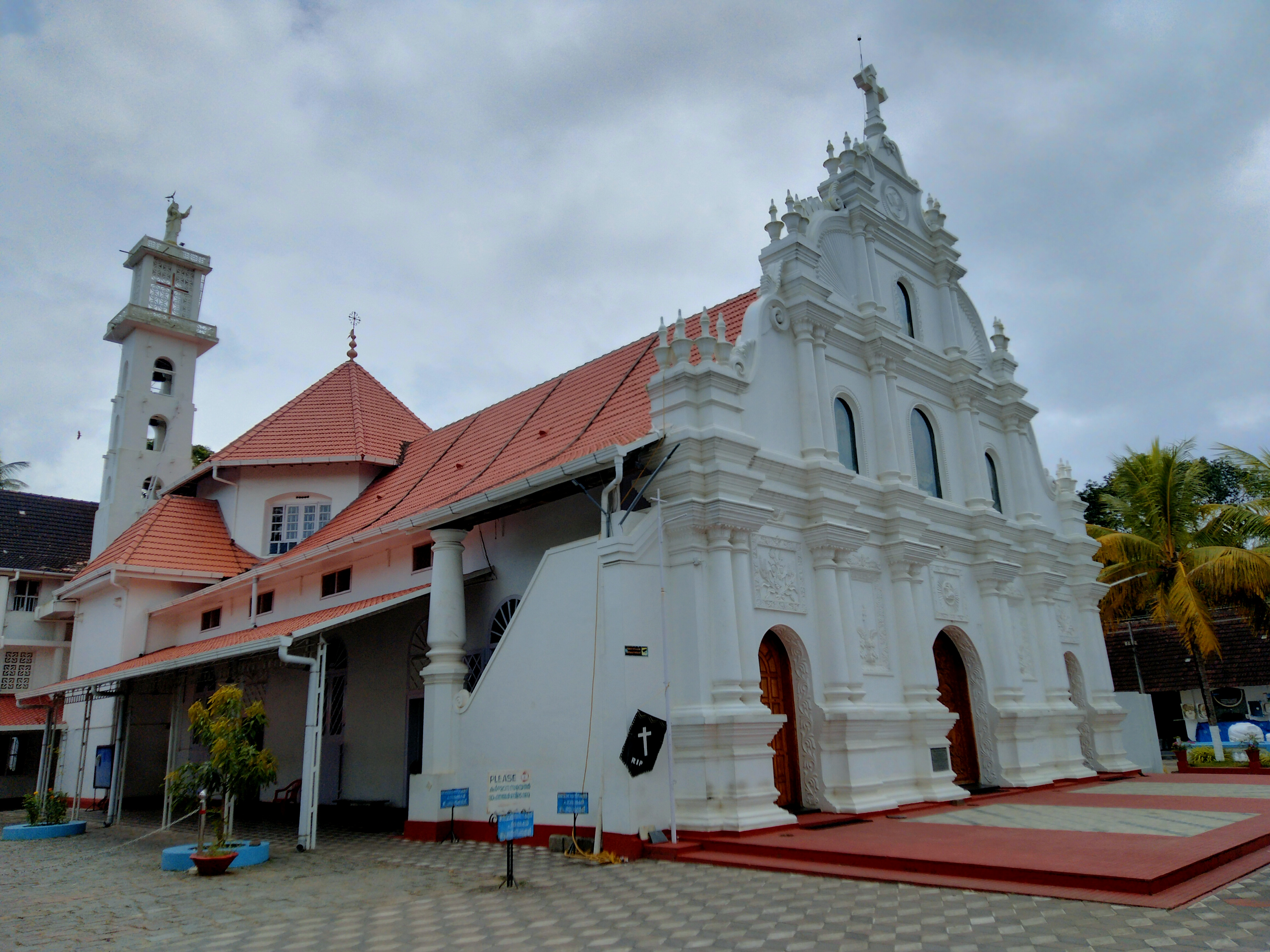
Njarakkkal Marth Mariam Suriyanipally

- Njarakkal St. Mary's Syro-Malabar Church – Established in 1451 in Vypeen by the Syrian Christians who separated from the North Paravur Kottakavu church.
- Nechoor St Thomas Orthodox Syrian Church – The Nechoor Syrian Church was established in 1455 by the Syrian Christians who separated from the Piravom Syrian Valiyapally.

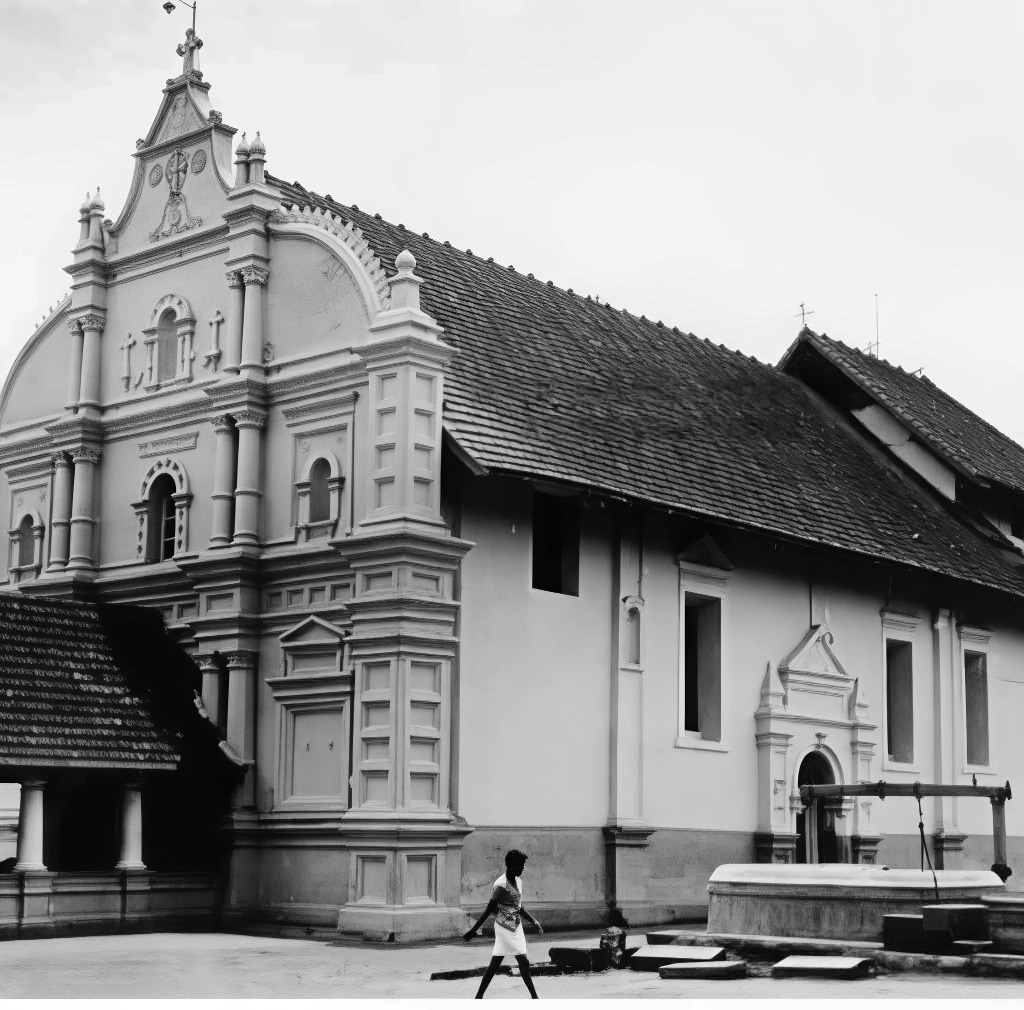
Kothamangalam Mar Thoma Sleeha Cheriyapally

- Kothamanagalam St Thomas Syrian Church – The Kothamanagalam Mar Thoman Cheriyapally was established in 1455 by 18 families who separated from the Kothamanagalam Valiyapally.

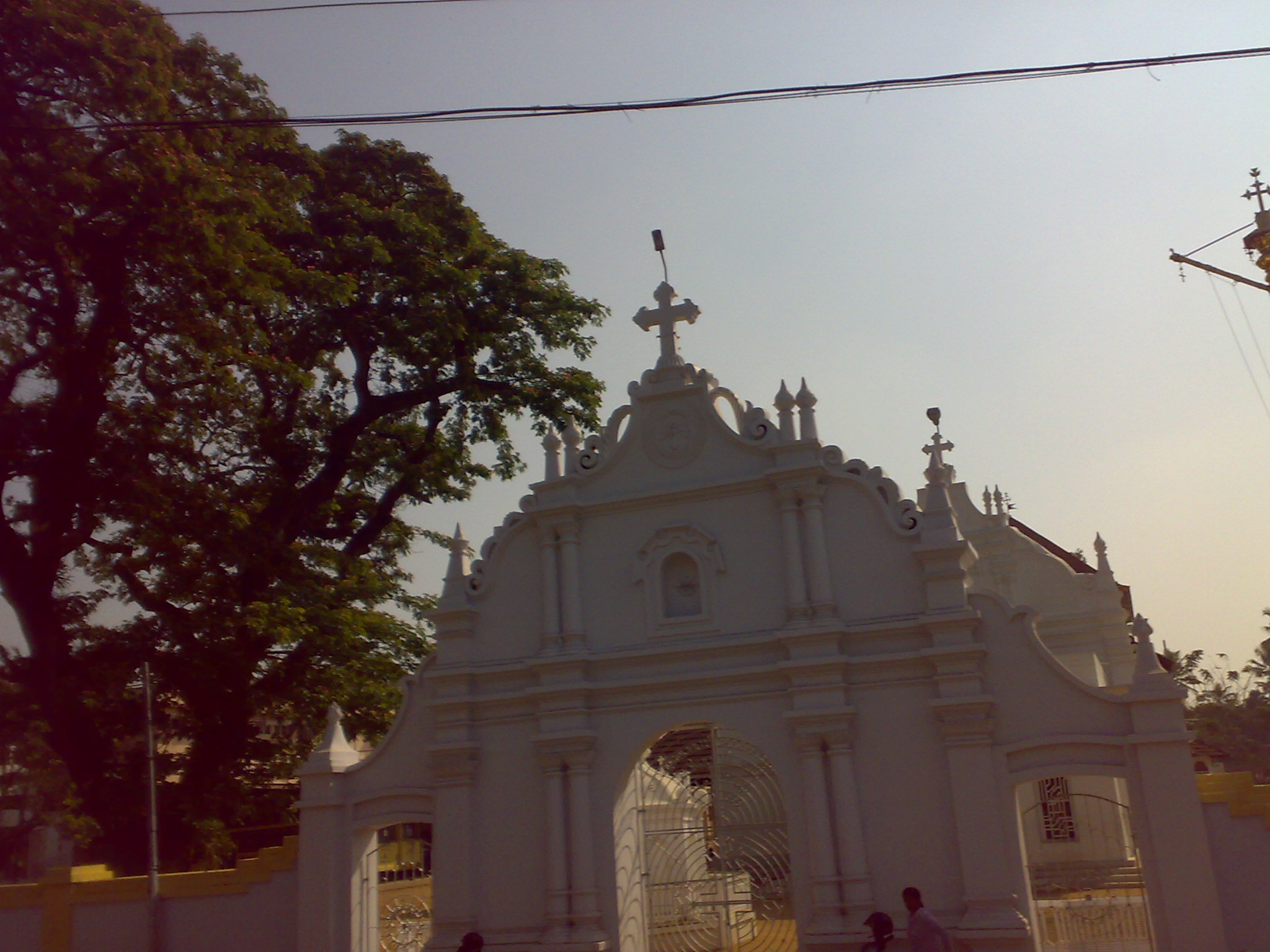
Vadakkan Paravoor Mar Thoma Sleeha Yakobaya Suriyanipally

- North Paravur St Thomas' Jacobite Syrian Church – Established in 1566, the North Paravur Syrian Church is known for the tomb of the Syrian Orthodox Archbishop of Jerusalem - Saint Gregorios Abdul Jaleel for the Syrian Christians who separated from the Kottakkavu Church.

== Idukki district (Thodupuzha region) ==
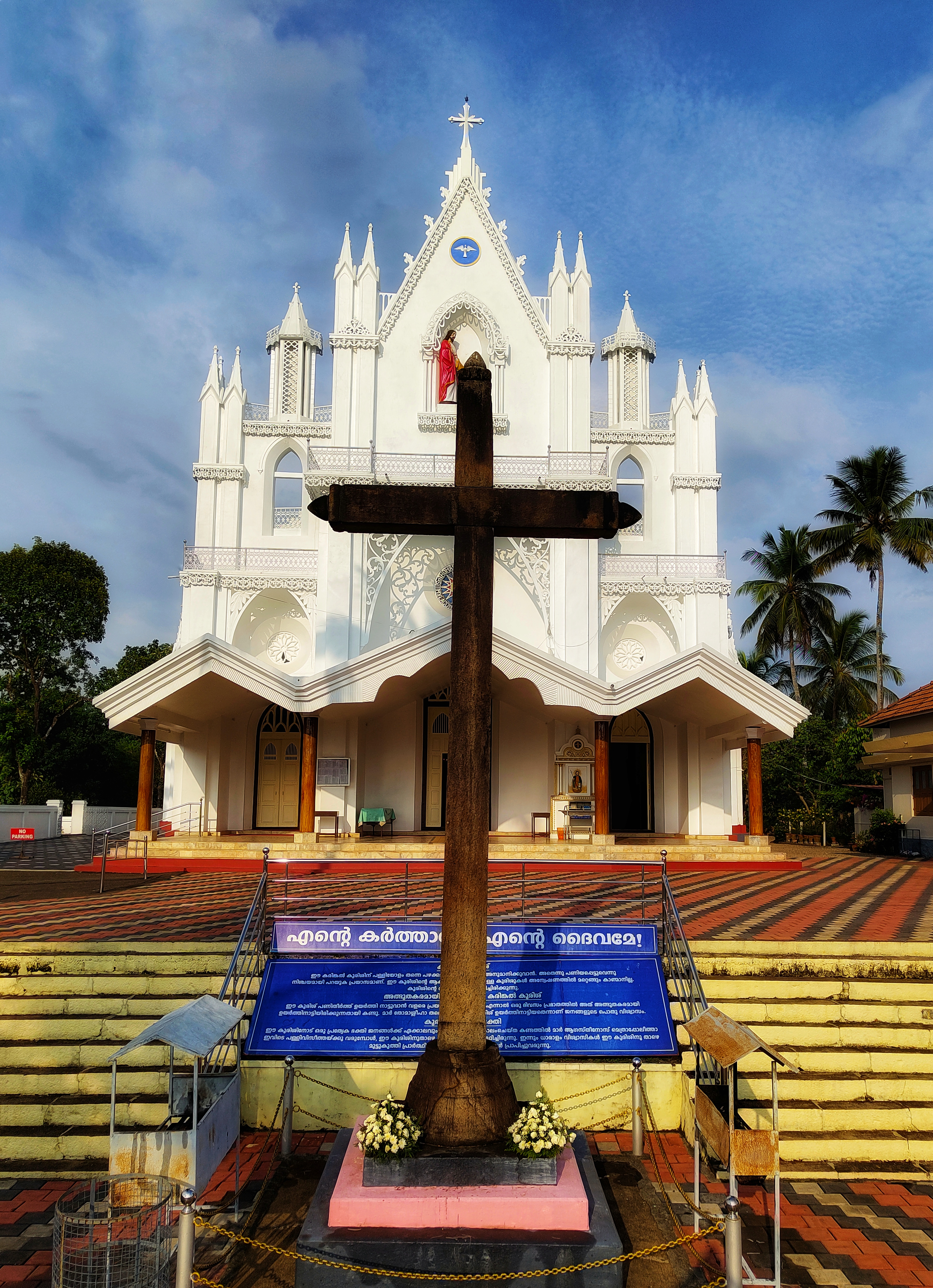
Mylakombu Mar Thoma Sleeha Suriyanipally

- Mylacombu St Thomas Syro-Malabar Church, Thodupuzha – Built in 660 AD by Syrian Christian settlers in Mylacombu near Thodupuzha who migrated from Kuravilangad, Kodungallur, Angamaly, Kadamattom and Vadakara, Koothattukulam.
- Nakapuzha St Mary's Syro-Malabar Church, Thodupuzha – The Nakapuzha church was established in 900 AD by the Syrian Christians who migrated to Nagapuzha, Thodupuzha from Kuravilangad and Kaduthuruthy and by the Syrian Christians who separated from the Mylakombu Church.
- Nediyassala St Mary's Syro-Malabar Church, Thodupuzha – Incepted in 999 AD, Nediyasala Church is one of the ancient churches in the Eparchy of Kothamangalam which belongs to the Syro-Malabar Major Archiepiscopal Church. The Nediyassala Church was established by the Syrian Christians of Nediyassala who separated from the Mylakombu Church. The Syrian Christian immigrants from Udayamperoor, Kuravilangad, Mulamthuruthy, Kaduthuruthy, Edappally, etc. to the high ranges in the 999 AD along with the Syrian Christians who separated from the nearby Mylakombu church established the Nediyasala Church.

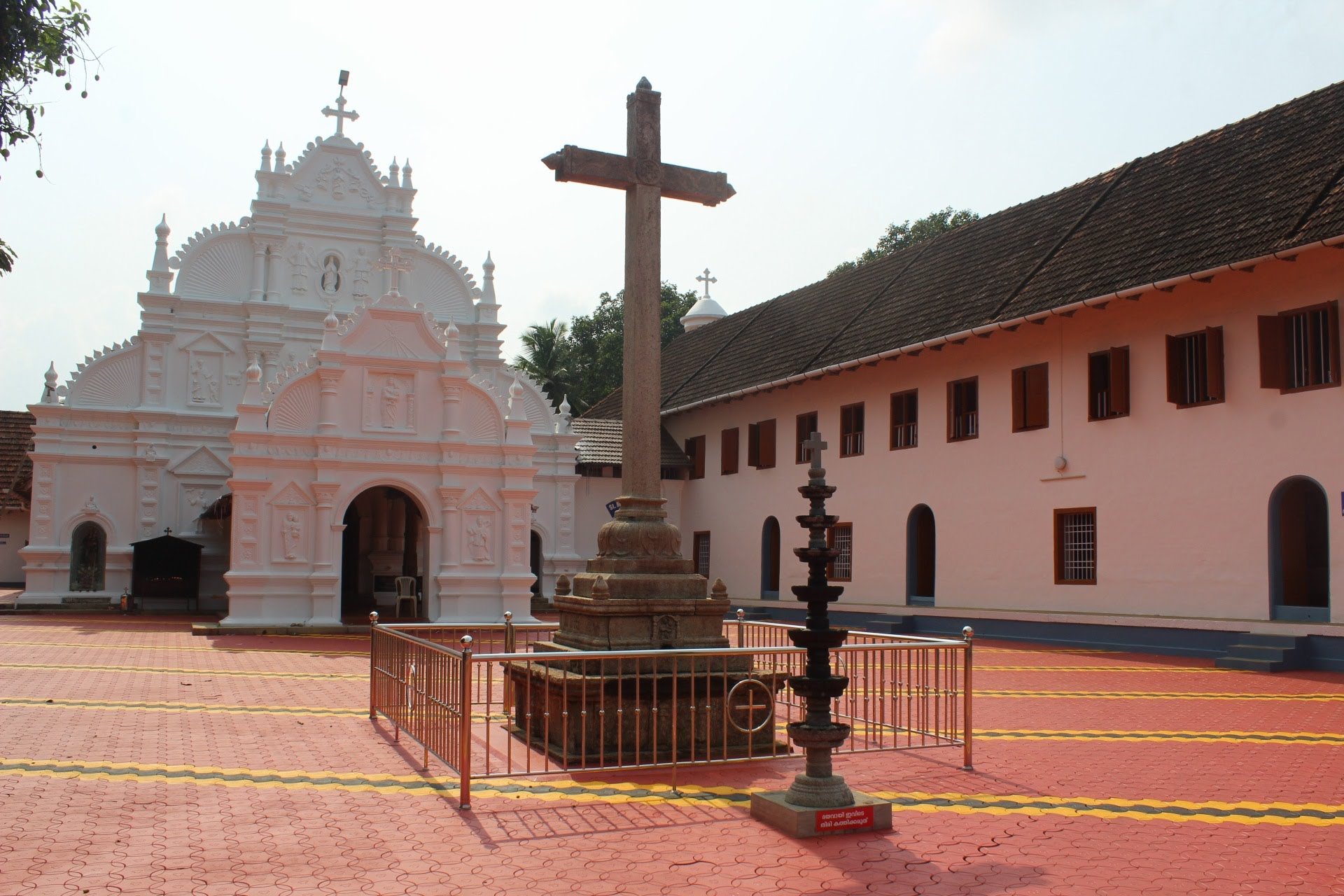
Arakuzha Marth Mariam Suriyanipally

- Arakuzha Saint Mary's Syro-Malabar Major Archiepiscopal Church – The Arakuzha Syrian Church is an ancient Syrian Catholic Church which was built by the local jenmi, Prathipally Karthakal for the 1000 Syrian Christian families of Arakuzha in 999 AD for those who separated from the Mylacombu Syrian Church.
- Muthalakodam St George Syro-Malabar Forane Church, Thodupuzha – The church at Muthalakodam, near Thodupuzha, is believed to have been built in 1312 by an ancient noble lady named Kapputhiriyamma (Mattathil Muthi) for the Syrian Christians of Muthalakodam who attended the Mylacombu Syrian Church for worship.
- Chunkom St Mary's Knanaya Syro-Malabar Forane Church, Thodupuzha – The Chunkom Knanaya Church was established in 1579 by the Knanaya Christians who had migrated from Kodungallur following a war between the Zamorin of Calicut and Cochin Kingdom, and the Knananites who migrated from Udayamperoor in the 9th century who separated from the Mylacombu Syrian Church.

== Kottayam district ==
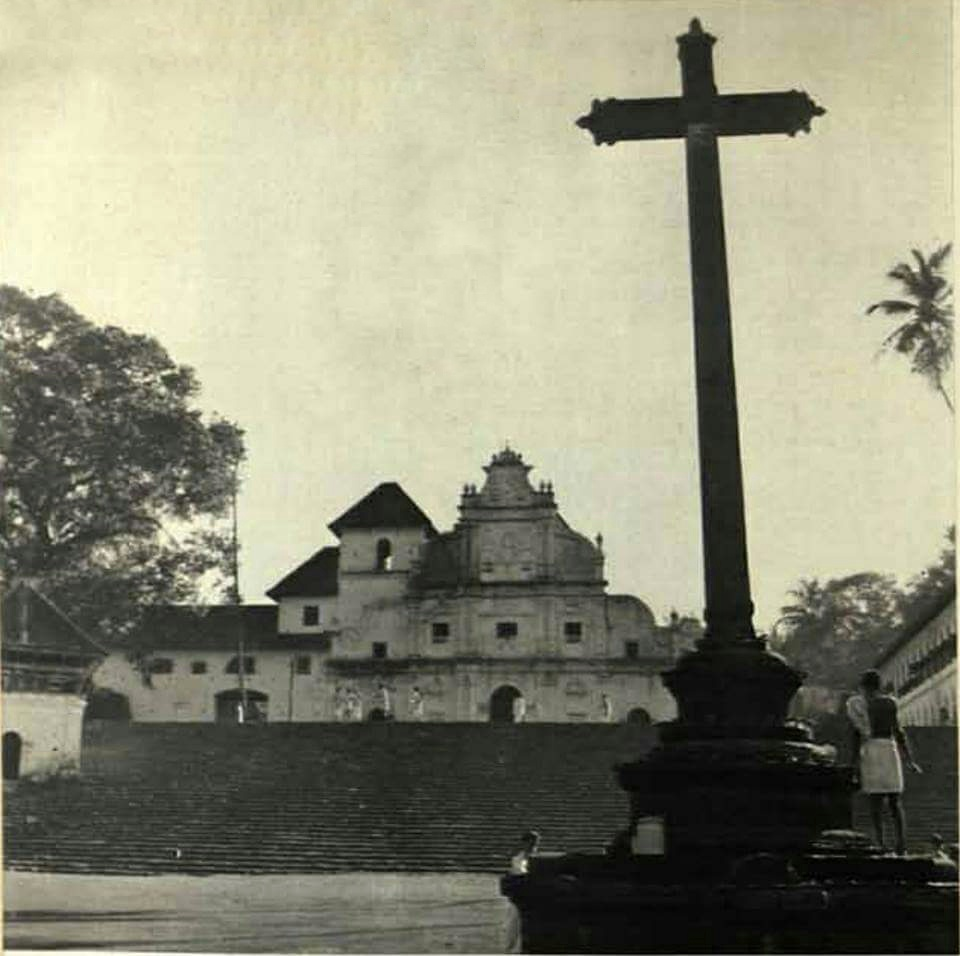
Kuravilangad Martha Mariam Suriyanipally

- Kuravilangad Marth Mariam Syro-Malabar Catholic Forane Church – One of the oldest churches of Kerala is the St. Mary's Church Kuravilangad, which is supposed to have been established in 105 AD by the Syrian Christians who migrated from Kodungallur, North Paravur and Palayoor
- Aruvithura St George's Syro-Malabar Church – It is believed that St. Thomas visited Irapeli in Arivithura and converted many prominent Jewish families into Christianity among them is the Thengummootil family, and laid a cross on the banks of the Meenachil River which in the year 151 was built as a church. Many Syrian Christians migrated from Kuravilangad to Aruvithura owing to the trading potential. In the 14th century when Nilackal (Chayal) was looted by the Pandya Kingdom of Madurai, the church of Nilackal (Chayal), established by Thomas the Apostle was destroyed and many Syrian Christian families migrated to Arivithura in Erattupetta, these immigrants joined the Aruvithura Syrian Church.

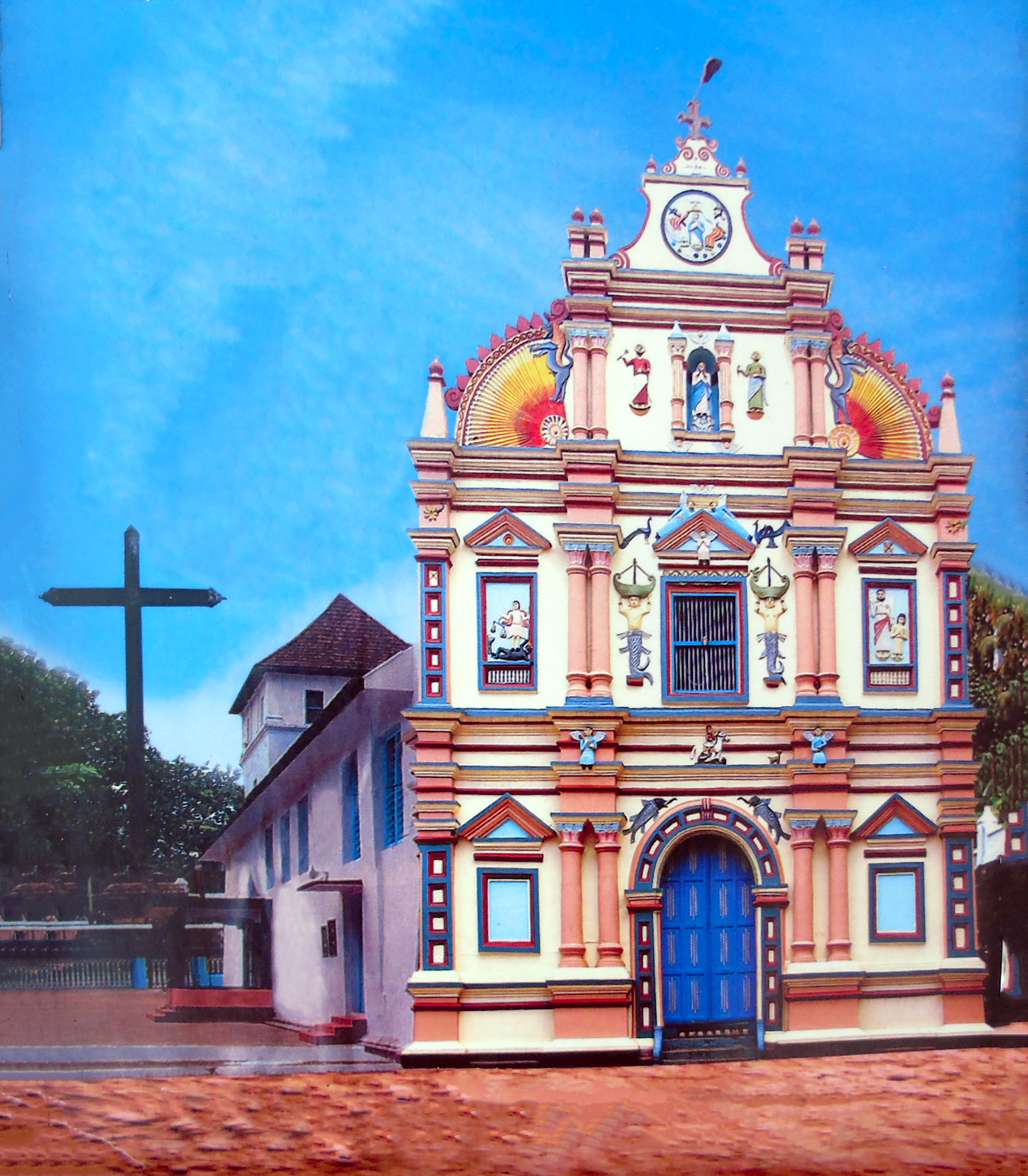
Kaduthuruthy Knanaya Marth Mariam Suriyanipally

- St. Mary's Knanaya Valiyapally, Kaduthuruthy – The Kaduthuruthy Valiyapally is a historic church founded by the Knanaya community in 400 AD who migrated to Kaduthuruthy from Kodungallur and the Saint Thomas Christians who separated from the Kuravilangad Church who had also migrated from Kodungallur and North Paravur. The Knanaya are Syriac-Judeo Christians who migrated from regions around Mesopotamia.

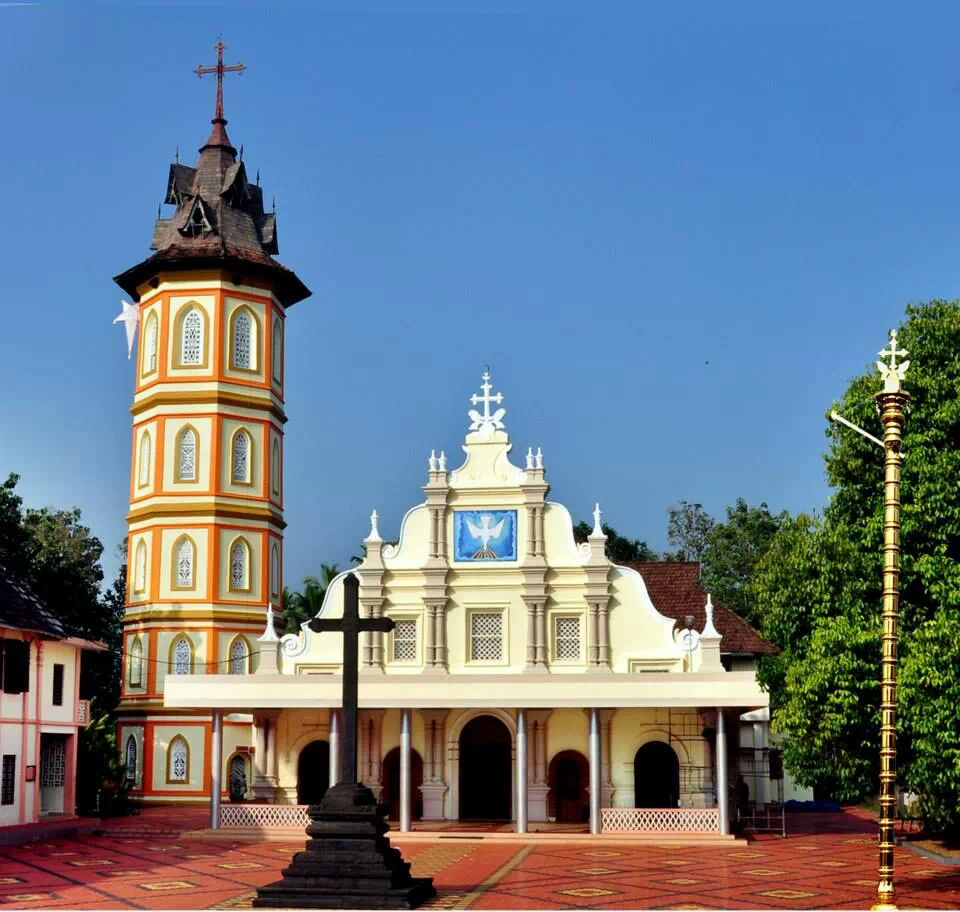
Muttuchira Ruhada Kudisha Suriyanipally

- Muttuchira Ruhada Kudisha Syro-Malabar Church – The consecration day of Muttuchira church was on the arrival of Pentecost on 25 May 550. The Muttuchira church is one of the most ancient churches in India. It is believed to have been built in the sixth century. The Christians were brought to this territory by the dependants of the then landlord Myal Pazhur Naboothiripadu and Mamalassery Kaimal. These local rulers helped the Christian congregation to build a new church in that area. The prominent Kallarveli family helped to build the church. The Syrian Christian ps of Muttuchira attended the Kuravilangad church before the establishment of Muttuchira church.
- Kothanalloor St. Gervasis and St. Prothasis Syro-Malabar Forane Church – The church is believed to have been built in 826 AD by Persian Nestorians Mar Sabor and Mar Aphroth and is well known for its twin patron saints, St. Gervasis and St. Prothasis.

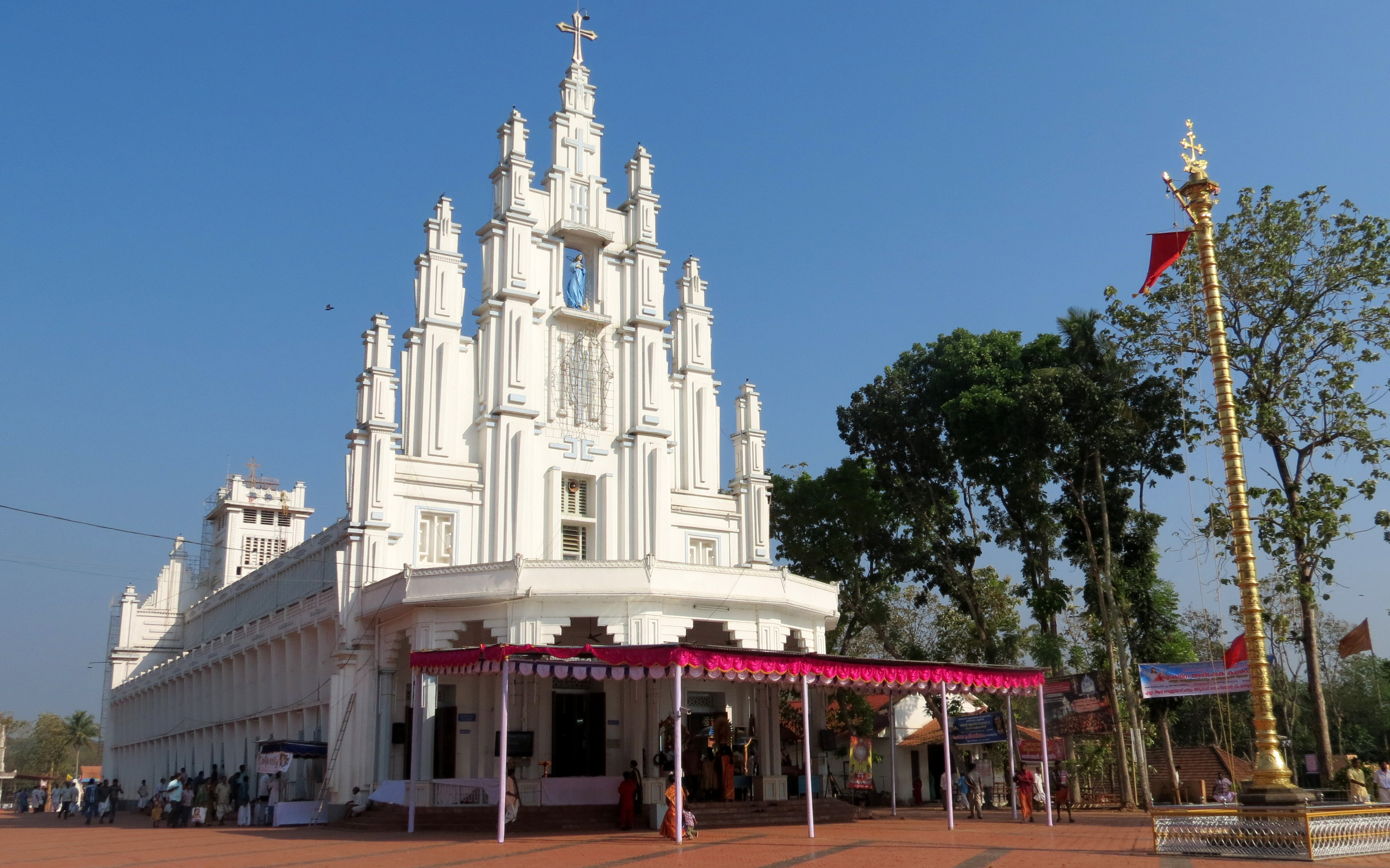
Athirampuzha Martha Mariam Suriyanipally

- St. Mary's Forane Church, Athirampuzha – Athirampuzha church traces its history to the Ettonnussery Illam which was the power centre of the local kingdom. It is said that the Namboodiri of this Illam donated the land to build a church in the name of blessed virgin Mary as a token of gratitude on the miraculous birth of his son for the Syrian Christians who migrated to Athirampuzha from Kuravilangad and Kaduthuruthy. The church was blessed on 15 August 835 AD. Athirampuzha acted as an inland trade centre for the trade routes between the hilly regions like Kanjirappally and Poonjar to the trading ports like Purakkad, Chennamkary and Kudavechoor after the 10th century. This trade route attracted many Syrian Christians from Kuravilangad, Kaduthuruthy, Vaikom etc. towards Athirampuzha.

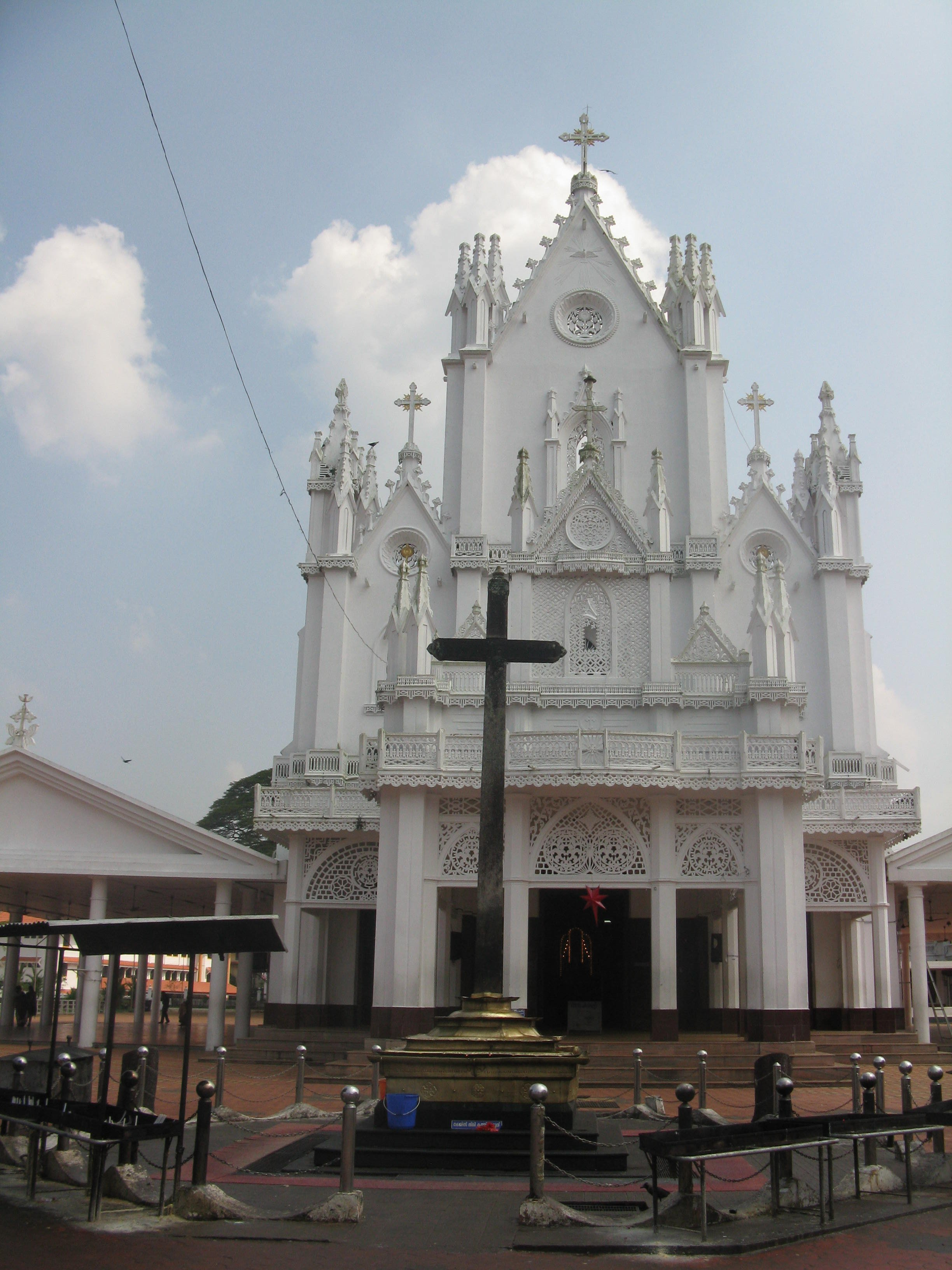
Manarcaud Martha Mariam Suriyanipally

- Manarcaud St Mary's Jacobite Syrian Cathedral – The old Manarcad Church was built in 920 by the Kallakkadampil family and Thekkumkur royal Kingdom. The Manarcaud Church was established by the Syrian Christian families which migrated from Kodungallur following a riot between the Jews and Muslims.
- Vadayar Infant Jesus Syro-Malabar Church, Vaikom – The Vadayar Church established in 977 AD is the oldest church in Vaikom. It was built by the Syrian Christian immigrants to Vaikom from Kuravilangad.
- Kadaplamattom St Mary's Syro-Malabar Forane Church – The Kadaplamattom Syrian church was established in 1009 by the Syrian Christians who migrated from Kaduthuruthy and Kuravilangad.
- Kaduthuruthy St. Mary's Thazhathupally – The Kaduthuruthy Thazhathupally was consecrated in 1009 by the Syrian Christians who separated from the Kaduthuruthy Knanaya Valiyapally.
- Pala St Thomas Syro-Malabar Cathedral – The church was founded on 3 July 1072, by four Saint Thomas Syrian Christian families. These four Christian families of Palai were Tharayil, Koottumkal (brother of Tharayil Mappila), Erakonni and Vayalakombil. Before the establishment of the Pala St Thomas Cathedral the Syrian Christians of Pala attended the Aruvithura Syrian Church.

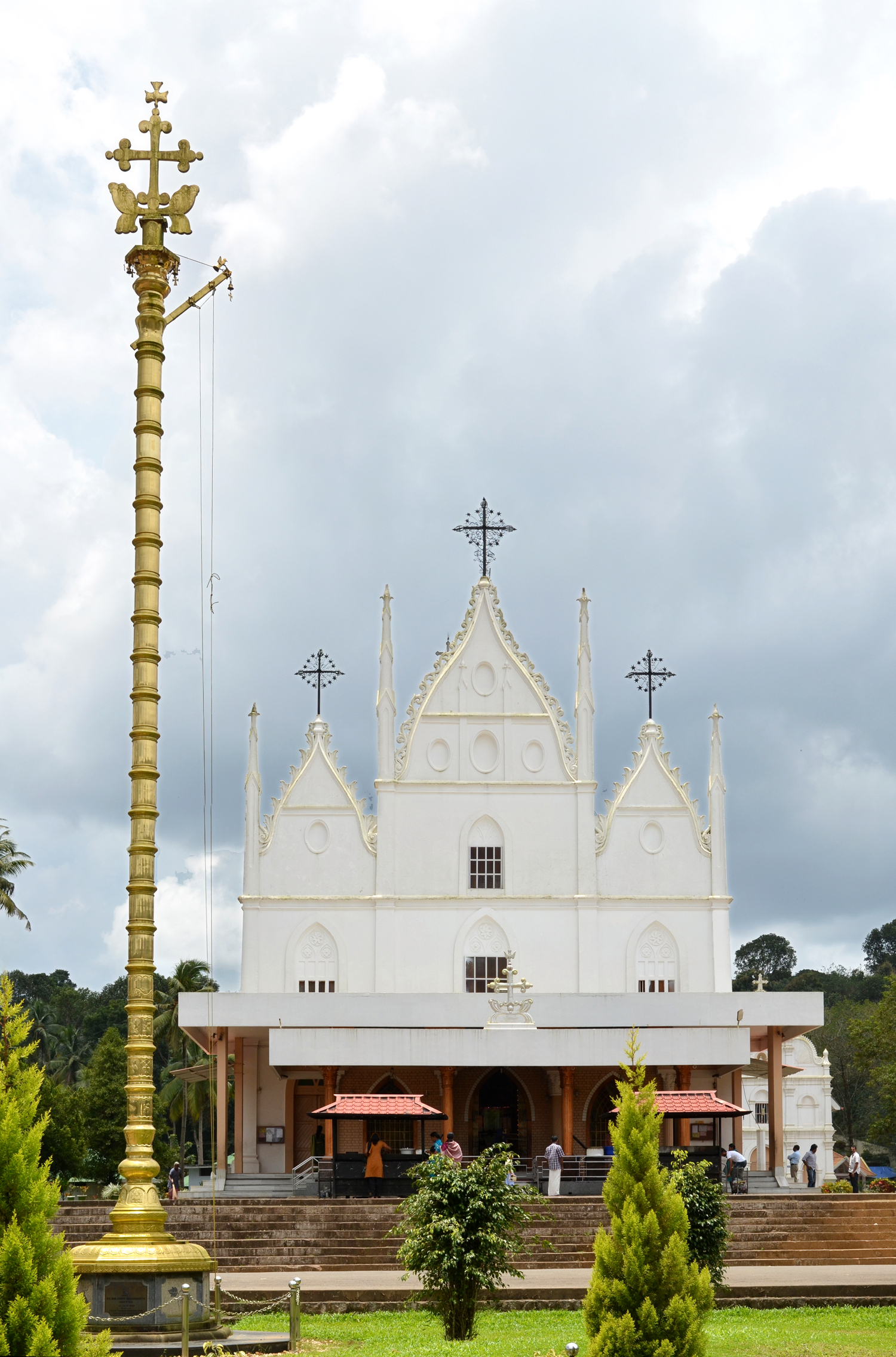
Cherpunkal Mar Sleeva Suriyanipally

- Cherpunkal Mar Sleeva Syro-Malabar Forane Church – Tradition has it that the stone laid by St. Thomas ultimately led to the founding of the Holy Cross Church at Cherpunkal. The foundation stone for the new church was laid on 14 September 1096. The land for the construction of the church was donated by Kallampally Namboothiri, a landlord and the construction of the church was ordered by the Thampuran of Poonjar.

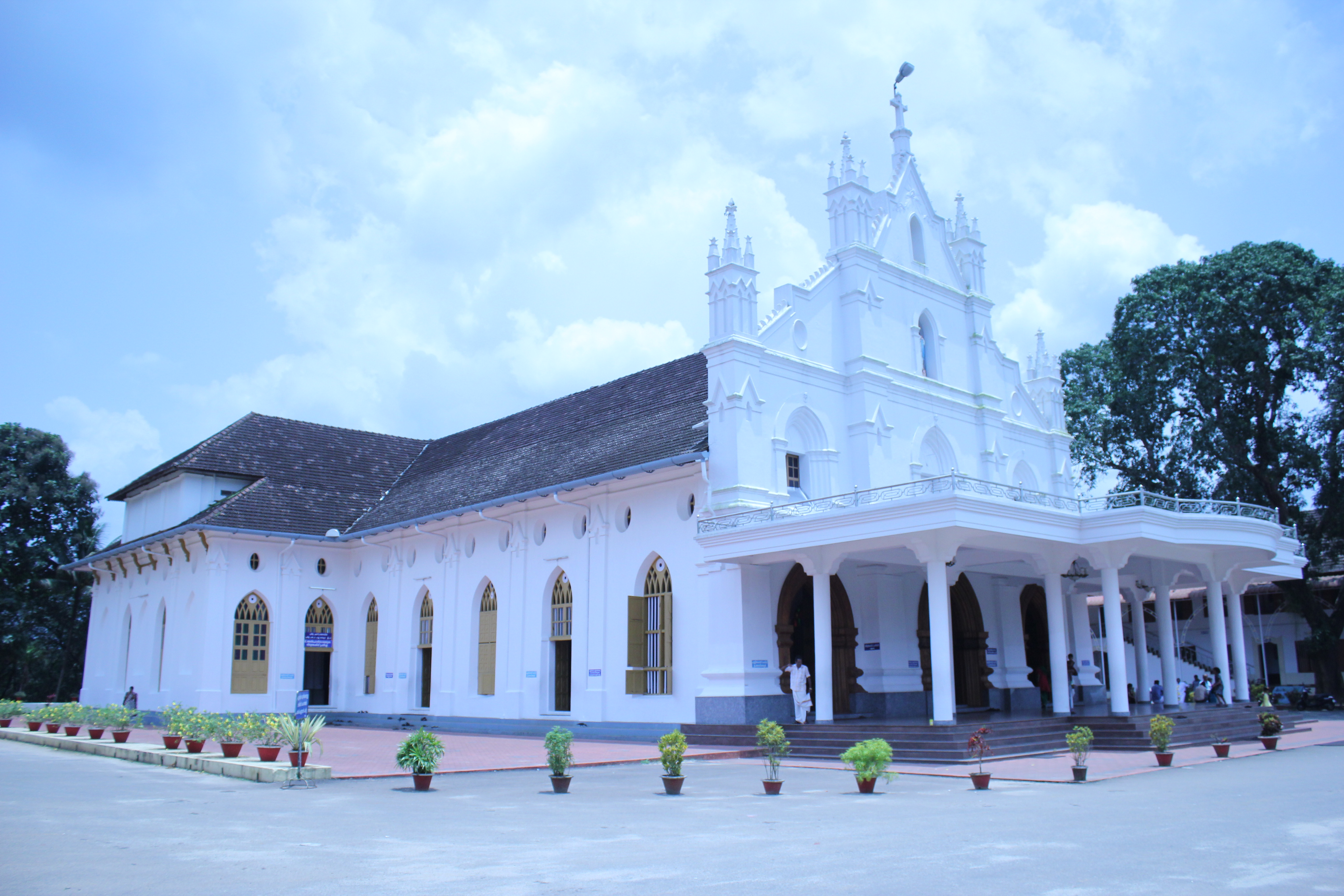
Bharananganam Anakkal Martha Mariam Suriyanipally

- Bharananganam Anakkal St Mary's Syro-Malabar Church – The Bharananganam Church was consecrated in 1100 by the Syrian Christians who migrated from Aruvithura and Palai. The tomb of St. Alphonsa is in this church.

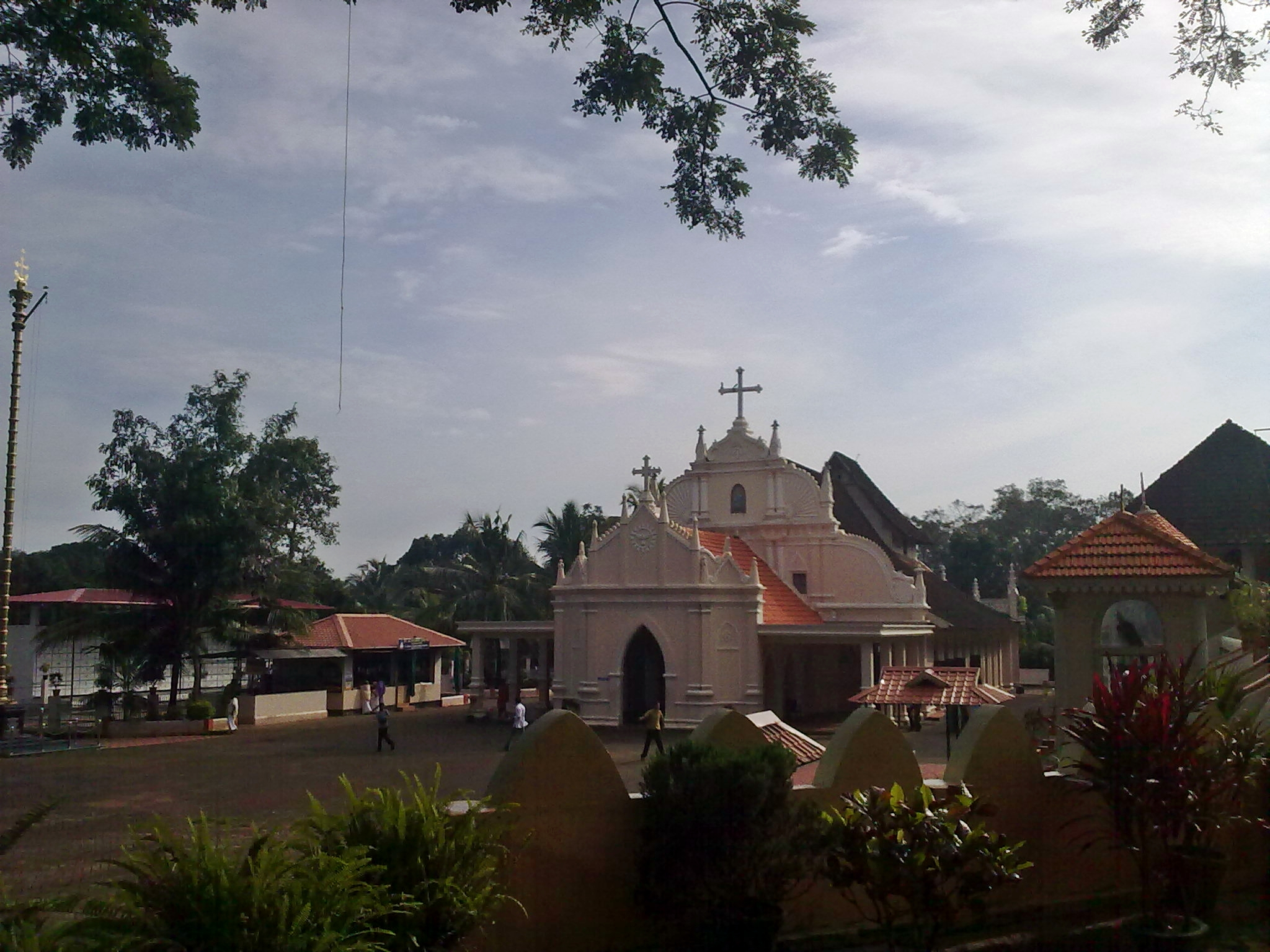
Kudamaloor Martha Mariam Suriyanipally

- Kudamaloor St Mary's Syro-Malabar Church – St. Mary's Church at Kudamaloor was built by Chempakasseri Maharajah in 1125 AD. A bell and the Paten, donated to the church by the Chempakassery King, are still preserved. The Chempaskassery Rajah built a church in Kudamaloor, his capital by the advice of his astrologer and brought five Syrian Christian families namely, Mukkunkal, Chakkunkal, Palathunkal, Thekkedam and Vadakkedam into Kudamaloor from Muttuchira and gave them land. As a result, Kudamaloor developed into a major trading centre in the Poonjar–Purakkad trade route. This attracted many Syrian Christian families into Kudamaloor especially from Athirampuzha, another trading hub.

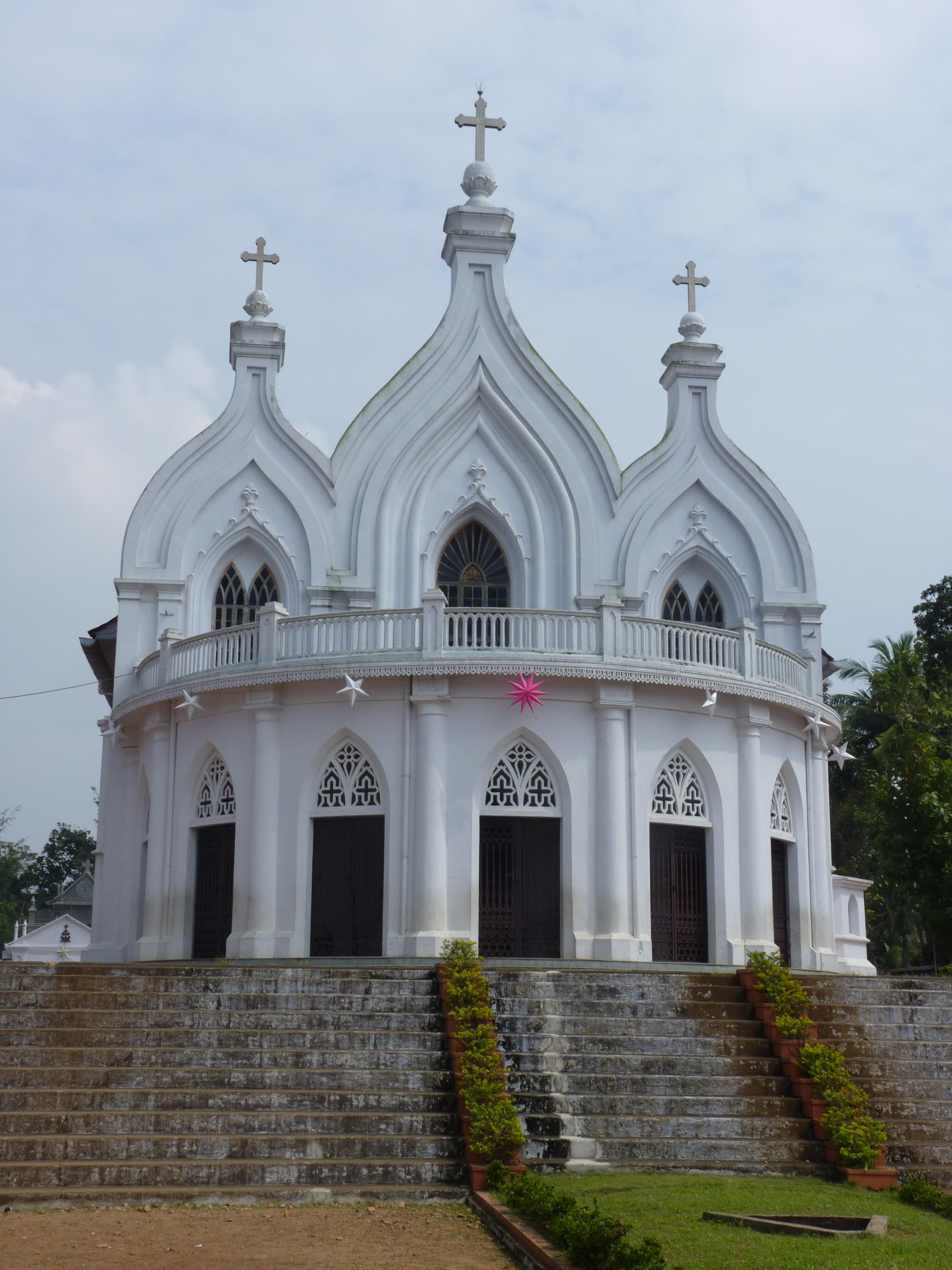
Changanassery Marth Mariam Suriyanipally

- Changanassery St Mary's Metropolitan Syro-Malabar Cathedral – The local Christian community in and around Changanachery inherits its faith directly from St. Thomas the Apostle, who formed a Christian community of faithful, centered on Niranam in the 1st century. The first church in Changanachery was established in 1177. The plot of land for the church was donated by the local Hindu king of Thekkumkoor.
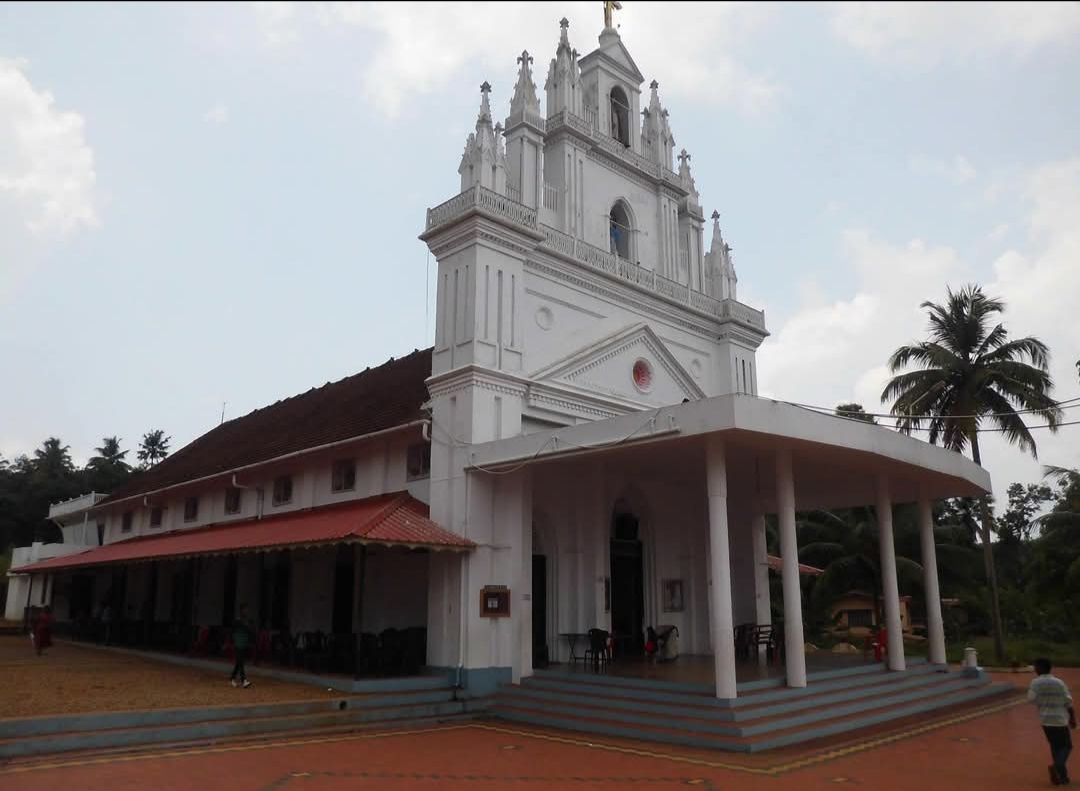
  Koothrapally St. Mary's Catholic Church
- Koothrapally St Mary's Syro Malabar Catholic Church (Muthappan Pally) - Established in 1876, the church was established by the Christian leader, Palakunnel Valiyachan who advocated for the Syriac culture and tradition. The church situated near Changanassery.
- Mulakulam Mor Ihidoyo Orthodox Syrian Church – The Mulakulam church was initially established as a chapel of the Piravom church in 1136. In 1566 it was reconstructed.
- Elanji St Peter's and St Paul's Syro-Malabar Forane Church – The St. Peter's and St. Paul's Syro-Malabar Catholic church was established in 1300 AD as per the order of the then Vadakumkoor King for the Syrian Christians of Elanji who formerly attended the Piravom Syrian Church for worship. Many Syrian Christian families from Angamaly had migrated to Ekanki along with the Azhvanchery Thampurakkal.

Chempu Mar Thoma Sleeha Suriyanipally

- Chempu St Thomas Syro-Malabar Church, Vaikom – The Chempu Syrian Catholic Church was established in 1307 by the Syrian Christians who migrated to Chempu, Vaikom from Pallippuram, Alappuzha and Kaduthuruthy. The Syrian Christians of Chempu attended the Piravom and Kaduthuruthy churches before th establishment of Chempu Church.
- Vaikom Pallipurathussery St Joseph's Syro Malabar Forane Church – The Vaikom Pallipurathussery Syrian Church was established in 1391 by the Syrian Christians who separated from the Vadayar Syrian Church and the Syrian Christians who migrated from Pallippuram, Alappuzha.

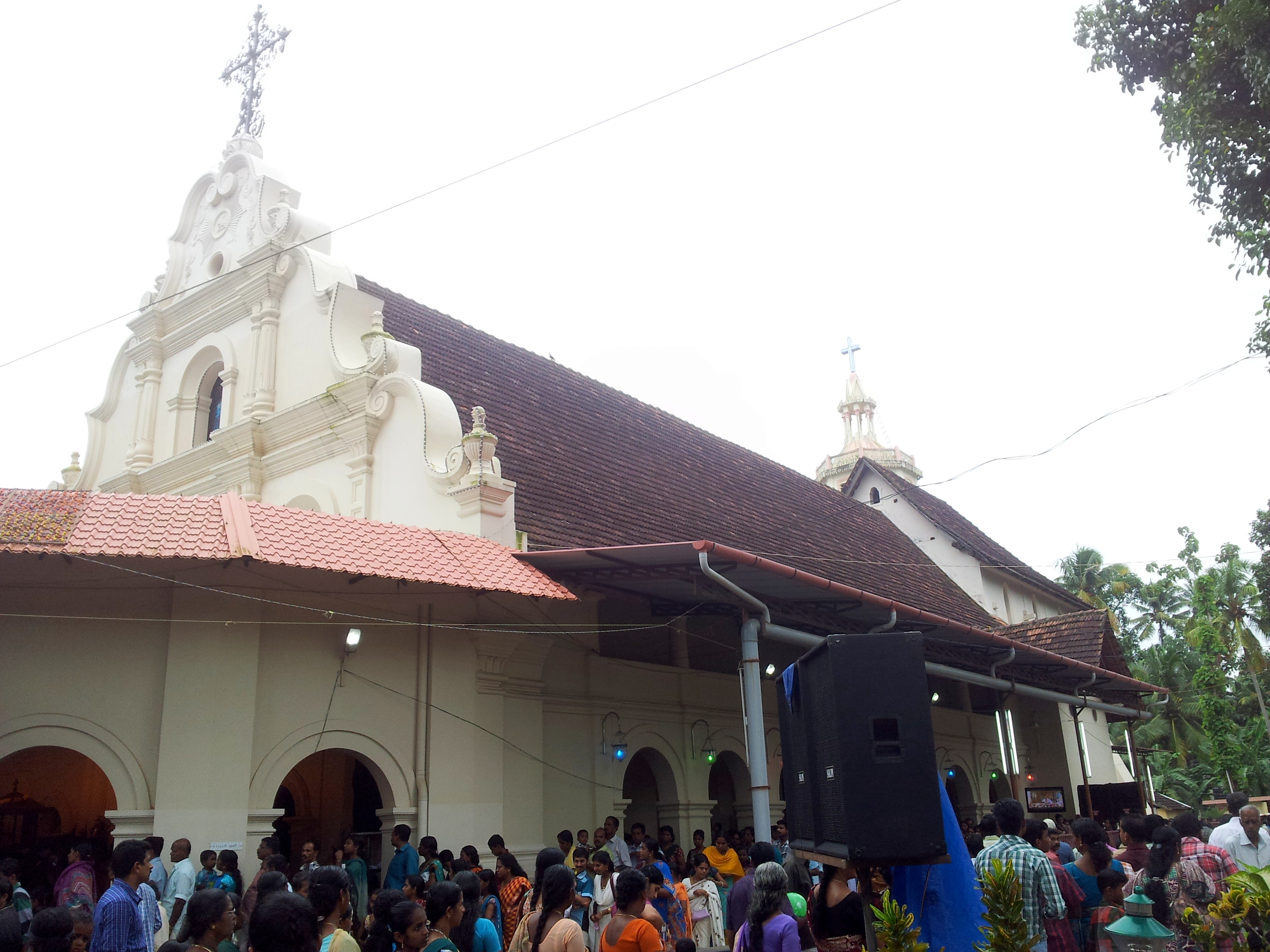
Kudavechoor Martha Mariam Suriyanipally

- Kudavechoor St Mary's Syro Malabar Church – The Kudavechoor St Mary's Syrian church was consecrated in 1463 by the Syrian Christians who separated from the Vaikom Syrian Church and the Pallippuram Syrian Church. Many ancient murals are found in the Kudavechoor Church.

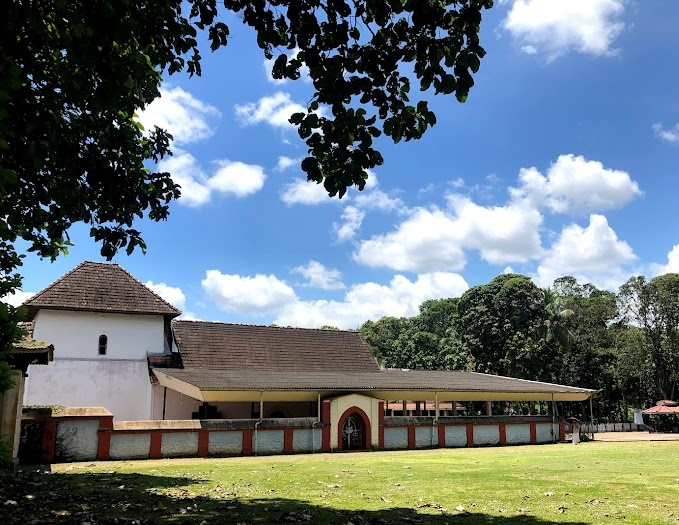
Kanjirapally Martha Mariam Akkarapally

- Kanjirapally St Mary's Syro Malabar Akkarapally – Thomas the Apsotle had established a church in Nilackal (Chayal) in 54 AD. It was an important trading city in the erstwhile Chempakassery Kingdom and had flourishing trade with the Pandya Kingdom of Madurai. But in 1325, Chembakacherry had was a war with kingdom of Madurai, probably owing to a trade dispute. The city was looted and torched and nothing remained of it. The Nilakkal church was burned down, but Thommy Mappilla, the Chief Trusty of the church managed to save the statue of the Blessed Virgin. The Syrian Christians of Nilackal led by Thommy Mappila fled to the Pazhoor Valley in Kanjirapally. Later, in 1449 a predecessor of Thommy Mappilla and Veera Kerala Perumal, the Maha Raja of Thekkumkoor Kingdom constructed a church in Kanjirapally.

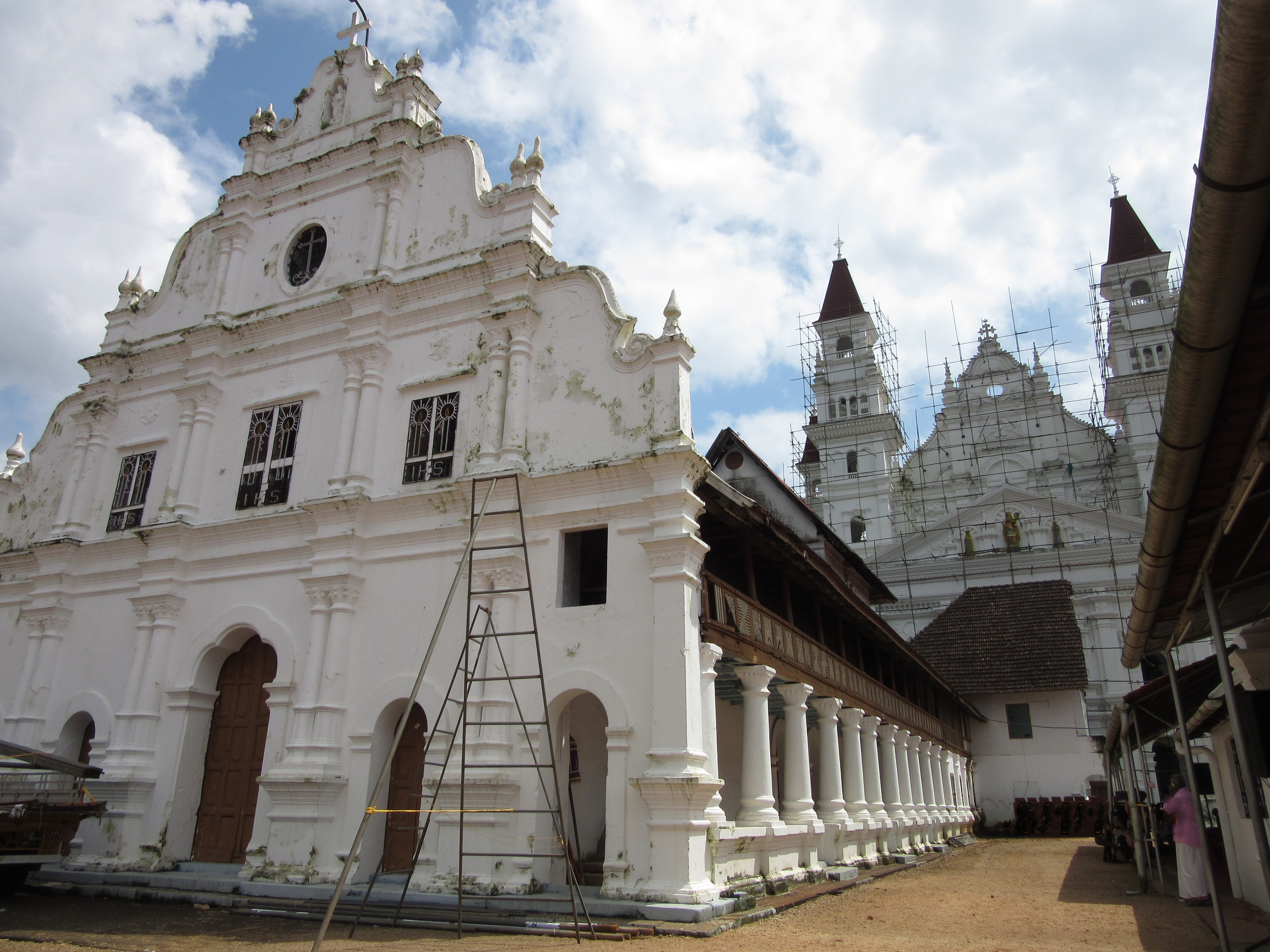
Ramapuram Martha Mariam Suriyanipally

- Ramapuram St Mary's and St Augustine's Syro Malabar Twin Churches – The centuries-old twin churches of Ramapuram are two of the oldest churches in Kerala. The complex consists of a smaller church dedicated to St. Augustine and a larger one dedicated to the Blessed Virgin. The church dedicated to St. Augustine dates to 1450, which was built by the King of Vadakkumkoor and the Karokkal Kaimal family (a feudal Nair family), while the one dedicated to the Blessed Virgin was erected in 1864. The Syrian Christians of Ramapuram had migrated from Aruvithura and Kuravilangad into Ramapuram in the early 12th century.
- Poonjar St Mary's Syro Malabar Forane Church – The Syrian Christians who migrated from Nilackal, Kanjirapally and the Syrian Christians who separated from the Aruvithura Syrian Church together built the Poonjar Church in 1542 AD. Many Syrian Christian migrations happened to and from Poonjar as it was an ancient trading point in the hilly regions along with Kanjirappally, Nilakkal and Ranni. The spices and the trading goods were transported to inland trade centres like Athirampuzha, Thazhathangady, Kottayam etc. through rivers like Meenachilar, Manimalayar and Pamba to the trading ports such as Purakkad Chennamkary and Kudavechoor. Many Syrian Christians of Kottayam trace their origins to Poonjar.
- Thazhathangady Orthodox Syrian Church – A worshiping community of Syrian Christian adherents existed in Thazhathangady dating back to the 12th century. Thazhathangady was the headquarters of the Thekkumkoor (Thekkumkur) Rajas who ruled over a principality which includes the larger parts of the present Kottayam and Idukki districts. The Thazhathangady Church was established in the 16th century by Syrian Christian migrants from Poonjar, Athirampuzha, Pallam, Chengannur and Kanjirappally.

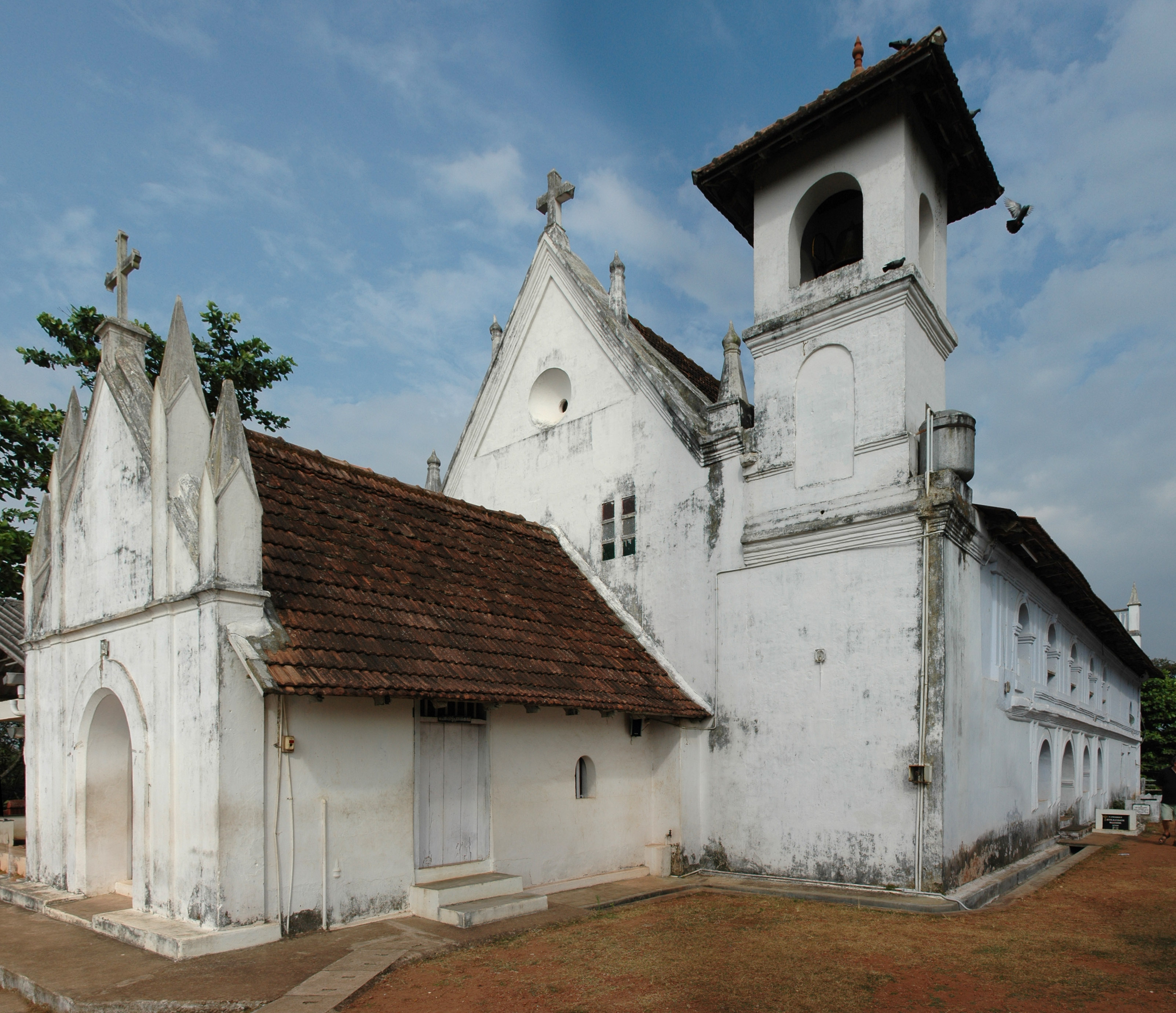
Kottayam Martha Mariam Valiyapally

- Kottayam St Mary's Orthodox Syrian Valiyapally–There were few Syrian Christians in Kottayam town till the early part of the 14th century based at Thazhathangady, Manarcaud and Kudamaloor. For various reasons many Syrian Christian families led by Pulikal family from Poonjar migrated to Kottayam and settled nearby Eruthickal temple belonging to Thekkumkur state. Large scale migration of Syrian Christians from Kuravilangad, Kaduthuruthy, Athirampuzha, Vaikom and Poonjar occurred in the 16th century and they settled nearby Kottayam, Pazhayachanda Thazhathangady, Puthenangady, and Valiyangady. The Kottayam St Mary's Knanaya Valiyapally was built in 1550 by the Thekkumkur Rajah for these Syrian Christians who had migrated to Kottayam town. At present the Malankara Orthodox Knanaya Christians use the Kottayam Valiyapally for worship.

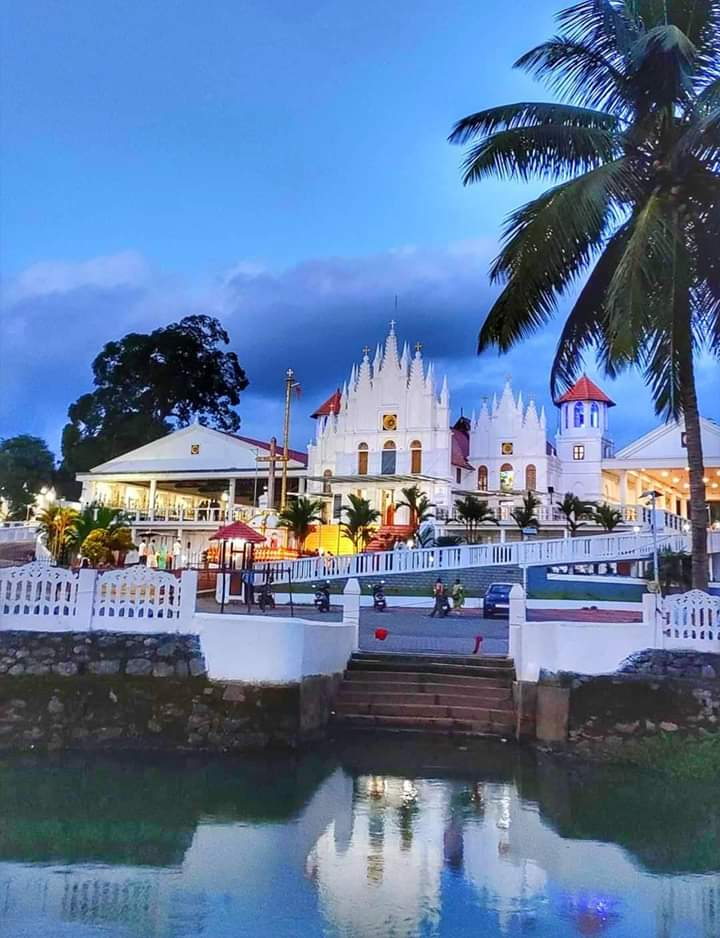
Puthupally Mar Geevarghis Sahada Suriyani Valiyapally

- Puthupally St George's Orthodox Syrian Church – The Puthupally Mar Geevarghese Suriyani Valiyapally was established in 1557 AD as a chapel of the Changanassery Syrian Church for the Nasranis of Puthupally who attended the Changanassery Church. It also accommodated the Syrian Christian merchant families from Kuravilangad, Poonjar, Nilackal, Niranam, Chengannur, Kaduthuruthy etc. who migrated to regions in and around Kottayam town in the 16th century.

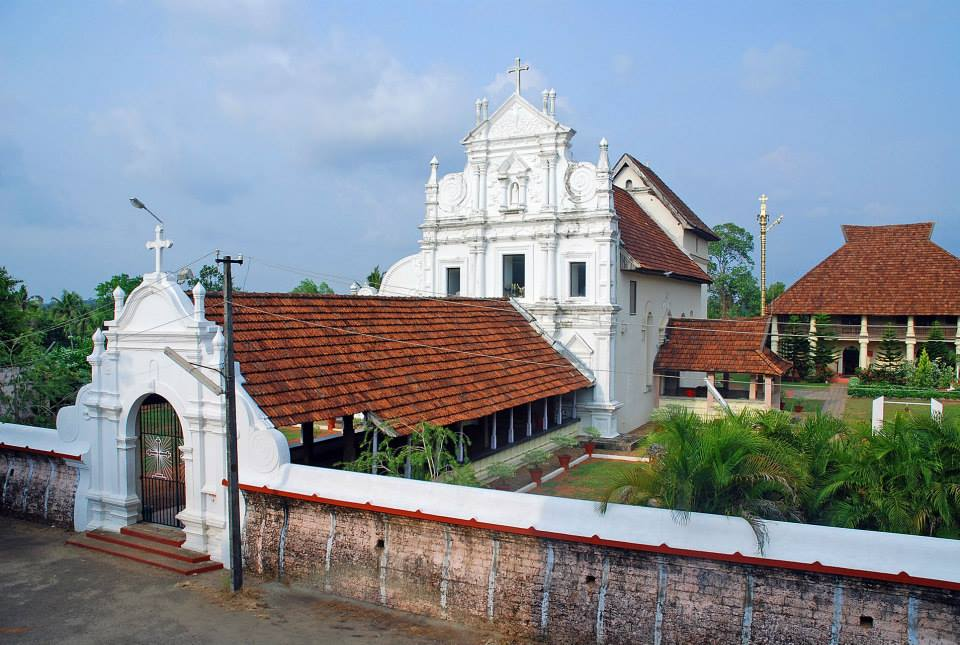
Kottayam Martha Mariam Cheriyapally

- Kottayam St Mary's Cheriyapally – The Kottayam Cheriyapally was built in 1579 by the Thekkumkur Kingdom for the Syrian Christians who separated from Kottayam Valiyapally due to a rift with the Knanaya community.

== Alappuzha district ==
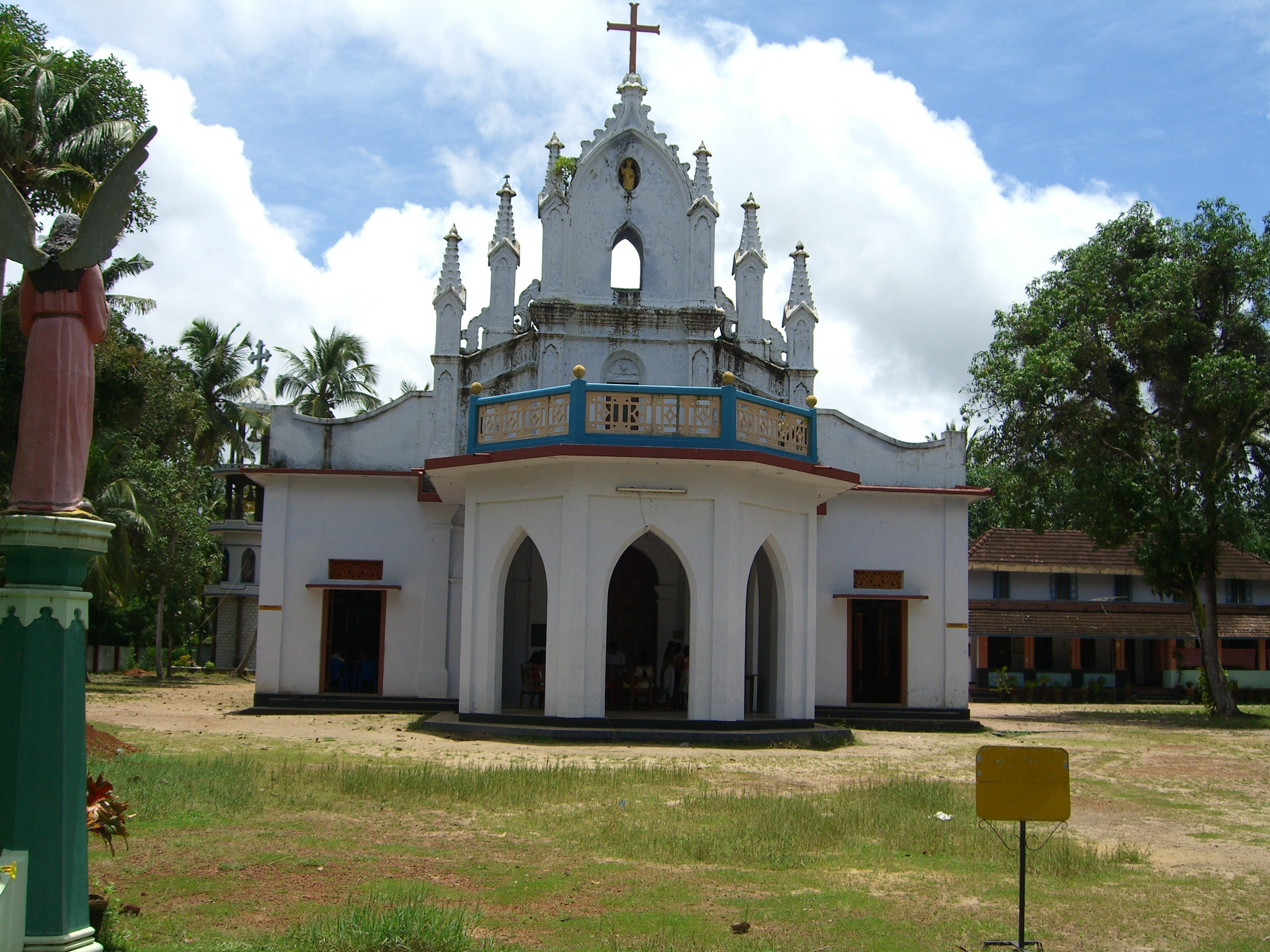
Kokkamangalam Mar Thoma Sleeha Suriyanipally Church

- Kokkamangalam St Thomas Syro Malabar Church – The Kokkamangalam Syrian Church was established by Thomas the Apostle in 52 AD and is one among the Ezharappallikal.

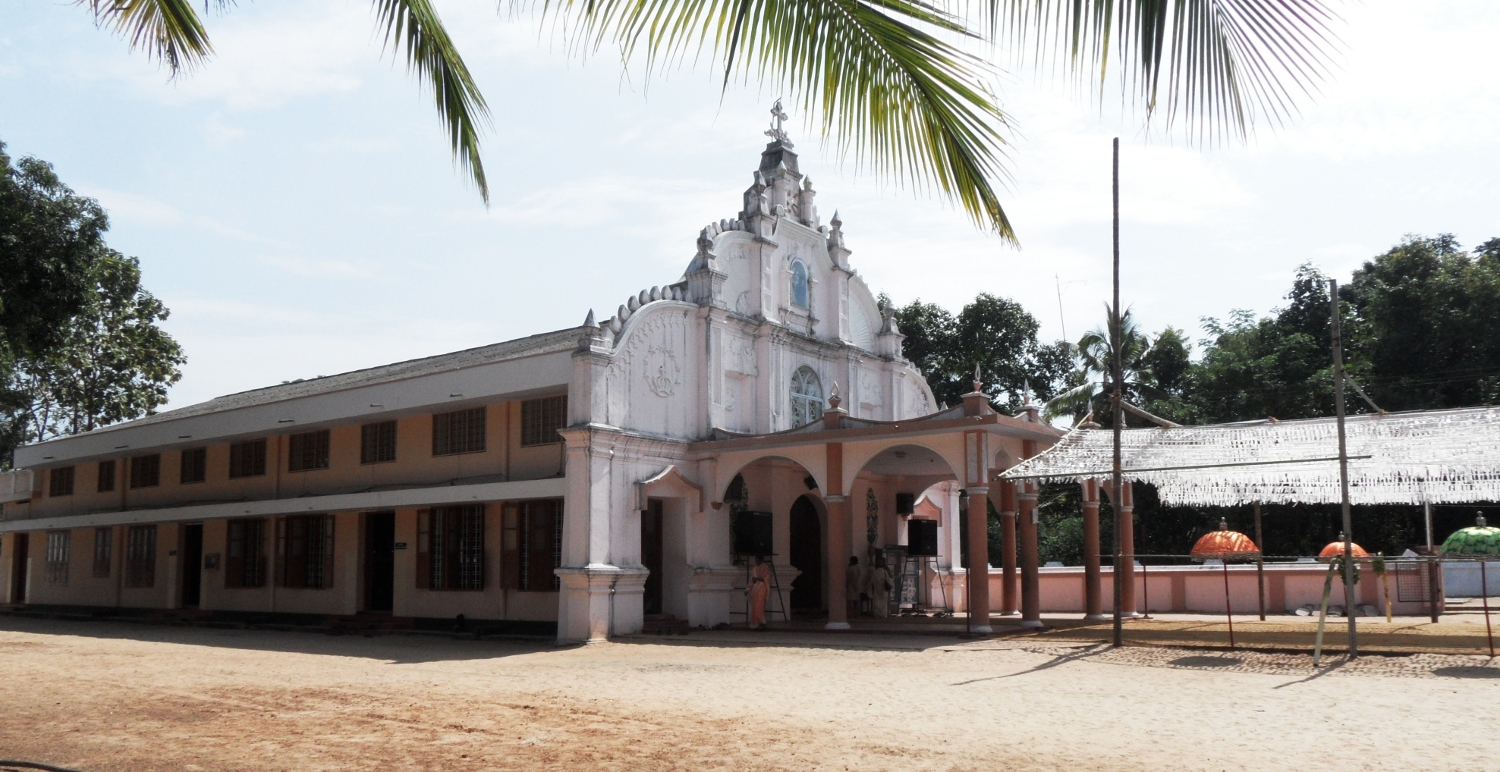
Pallippuram Martha Mariam Suriyanipally Church

- Pallippuram St Mary's Syro Malabar Forane Church – One of the most ancient churches in Kerala, the Pallippuram Syrian Church was established in 290 AD by former parishioners who separated from the Kokkamangalam Church.

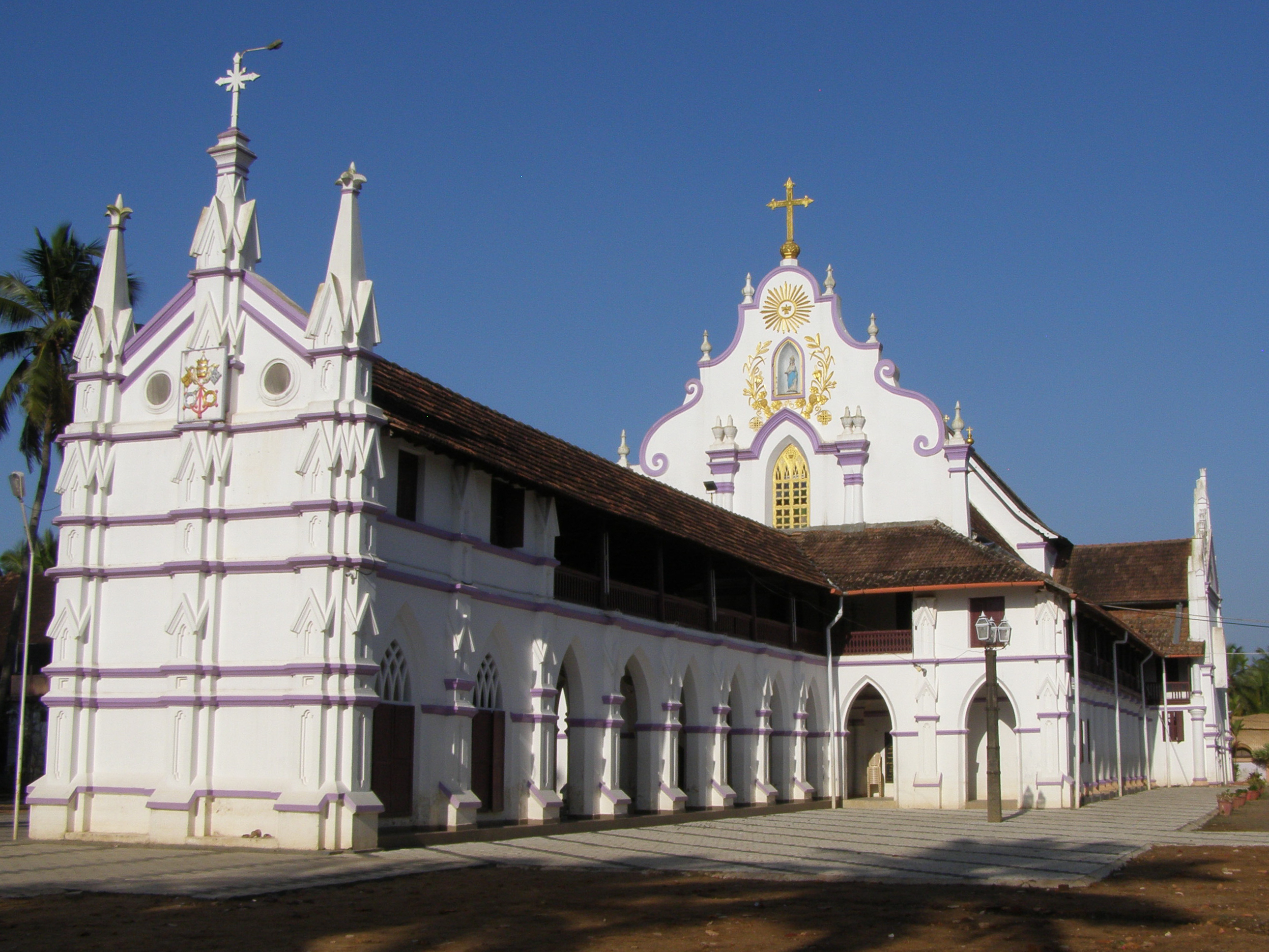
Champakulam Kalloorkadu Marth Mariam Suriyanipally

- Champakulam Kalloorkadu St. Mary's Syro Malabar Basilica – Champakulam Kalloorkadu St. Mary's Basilica (also called Champakulam Valiya Palli) is one of the oldest Christian churches in India and the mother church of almost all Catholic Syrian churches in Alleppey District. Believed to have been established in 427 AD, the church was rebuilt many times. The Syrian Christians of Champakulam had separated from the Niranam Syrian Church. The Kuttanad region which includes Champakulam, Pulinkunnu, Chennamkary experienced a huge influx of Syrian Christians in the 11th centuries from Kuravilangad, Kaduthuruthy, Vaikom etc. owing to its huge agricultural potential and as it was near to the ancient seaport of Purakkad.

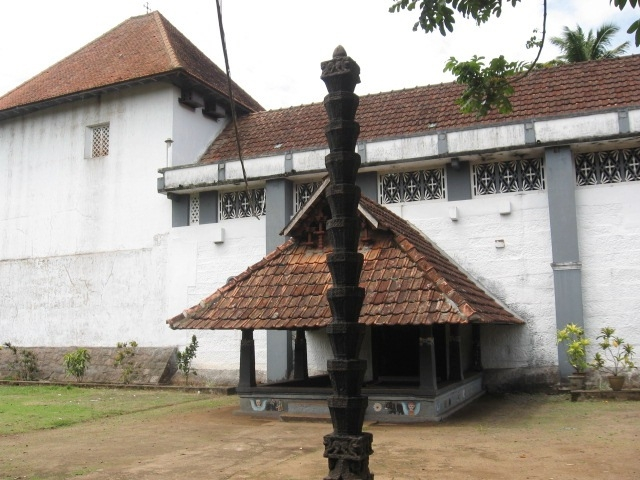
Chengannur Pazhaya Suriyanipally

- Chengannur Old Syrian Church – The Chengannur Old Syrian Church was established in the 4th century by the Syrian Christians of Chengannur and nearby areas who separated from the Niranam Syrian Church and migrated from Nilakkal.

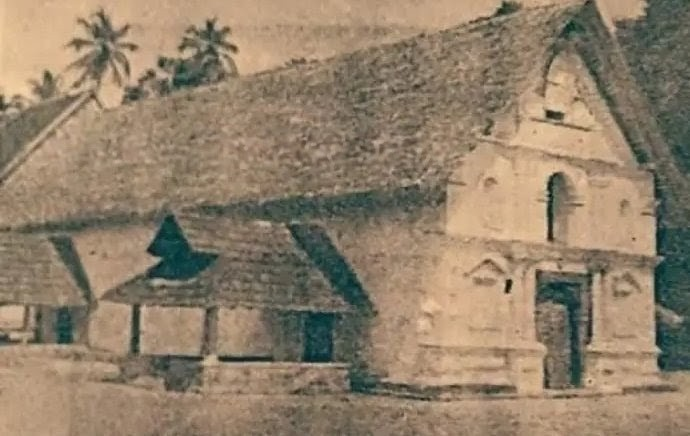
Kayamkulam kadeesha Suriyanipally

- Kayamkulam Kadeesha Orthodox Syrian Church – The church was established by the Persian Nestorian merchants Mar Sabor and Mar Proth in 824 AD for the Syrian Christians of Kayamkulam who had formerly attended the Kadampanad Syrian church. Significant migrations to Kayamkulam from Kadampanad and Thiruvithamcode occurred in the later centuries.

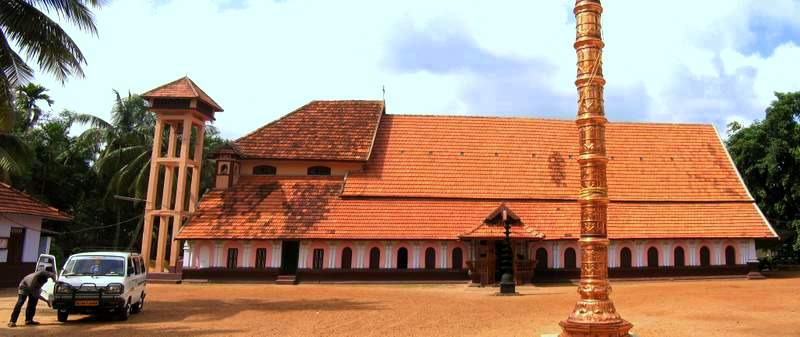
Karthikapally Mar Thoma Sleeha Suriyanipally

- Karthikapally St. Thomas Syrian Orthodox Church – The Karthikappally Kottakkakathu Old Syrian Church was established in 829 AD by the Syrian Christians who separated from the Chengannur Syrian Church. In the 11th century when the Old Haripad Church was demolished by the Karthikapally Naduvazhi, half of the parishioners established the Cheppad Syrian Church and the other half joined the Karthikapally Syrian Church.

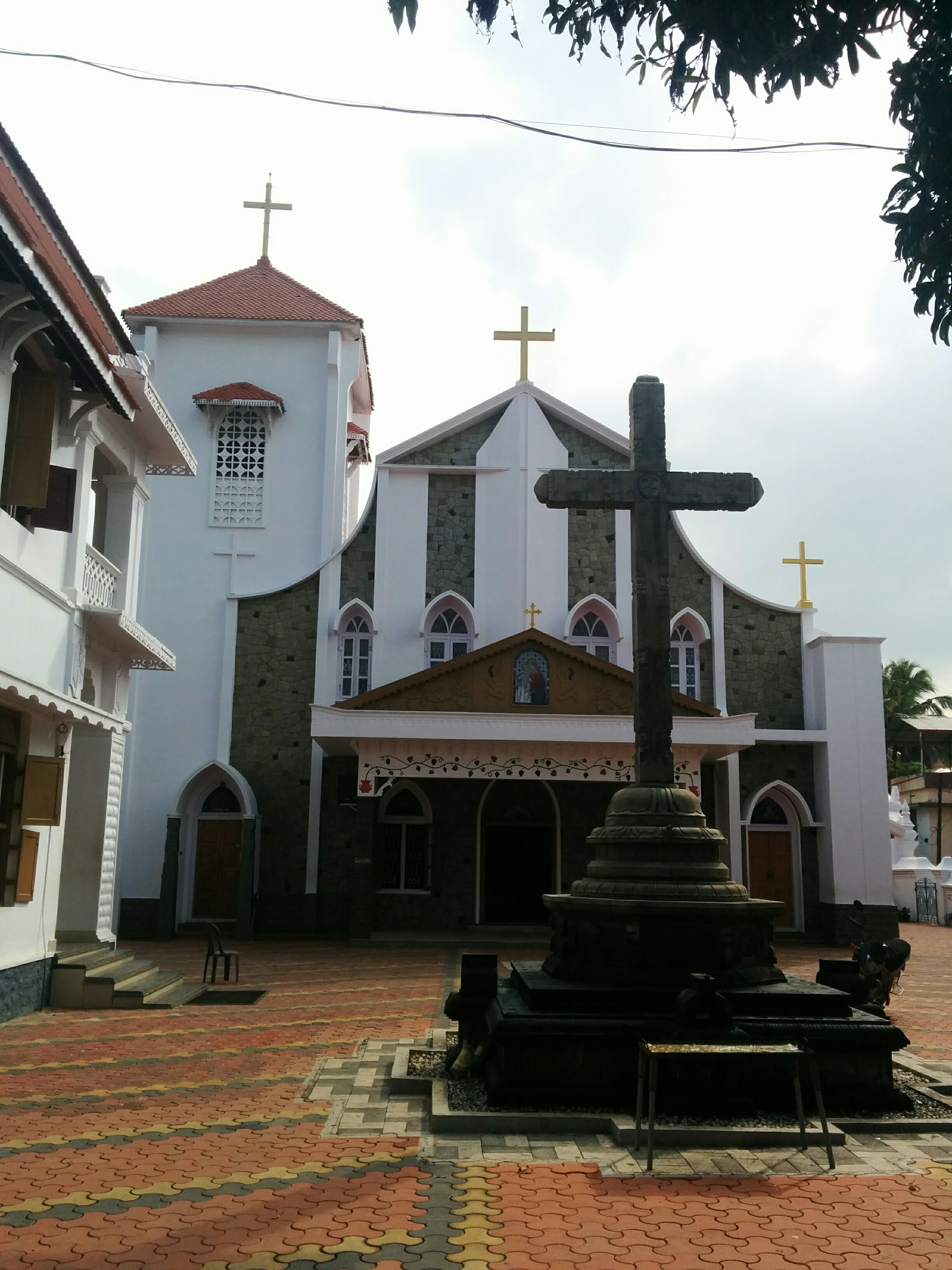
Mavelikkara Puthiyakavu Martha Mariam Suriyanipally

- Mavelikkara St Mary's Syrian Orthodox Church, Puthiyakavu – The Syrian Christians of Mavelikkara used to worship at the Kayamkulam Kadeesha Syrian Church but as it was far away the Nasranis with the help of the Mavelikkara Madamkoor King built the Kandiyoor Church at Mavelikkara at AD 943. But, the Kayamkulam King burned the Kandiyoor Church as a revenge to the Mavelikkara Madamkoor King. Thus the Mavelikkara Puthiyakavu Syrian Church was established in 943 AD by the Syrian Christians of Mavelikkara with the help of the Mavelikkara Madamkoor King. Many Syrian Christians from Kadampanad and Thiruvithamcode had migrated to Mavelikkara.

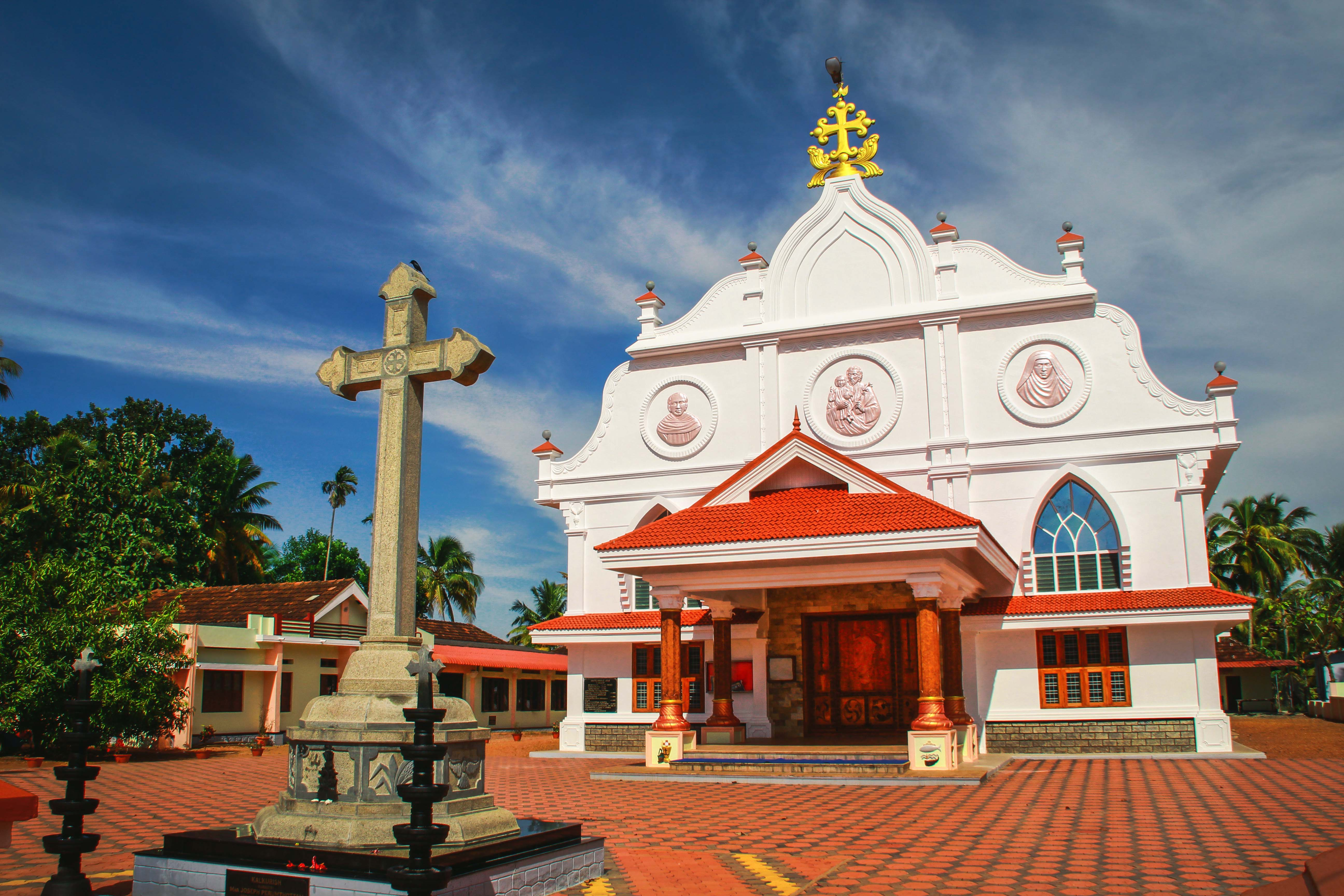
Chennamkary Mar Youseph Suriyanipally

- Chennamkary St Joseph's Syro Malabar Church – The Chennamkary Syrian Church was established in 977 AD by Syrian Christian immigrants from Champakulam. The Kuttanad region experienced a huge influx of Syrian Christians after the 11th century from Kuravilangad, Kaduthuruthy, Vaikom etc. owing to its huge agricultural potential.

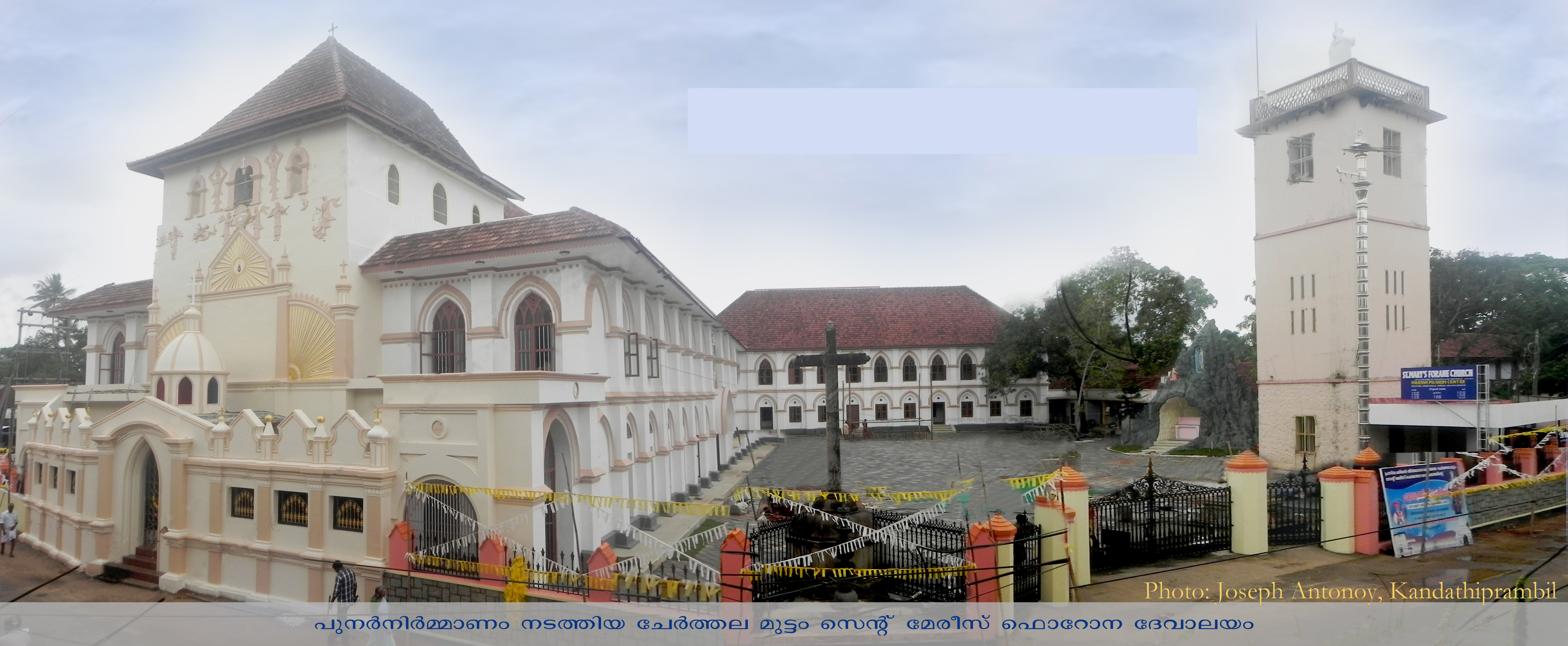
Muttom St Mary's Forane Syrian Church, Cherthala

- Muttom St Mary's Forane Syrian Church, Cherthala – The "Muttathu Pally" was built in 1023 in Cherthala, Alappuzha it served the Syrian Christians of Cherthala who had separated from the Kokkamangalam Church.

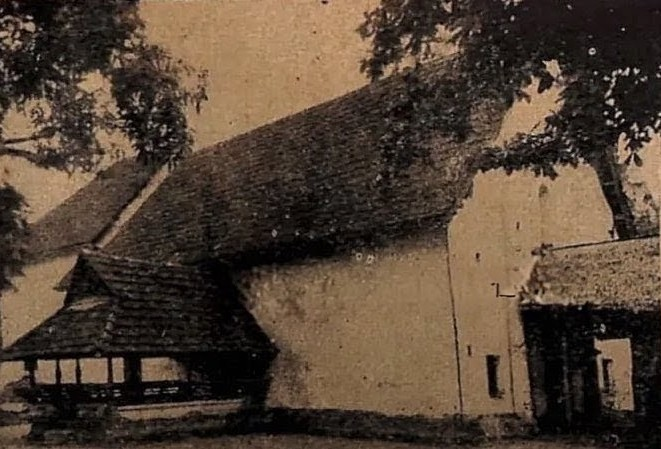
Cheppad Mar Geevarghese Sahadha Suriyanipally

- Cheppad St George Orthodox Syrian Church – It is believed that the church may have been founded in 1175 by the Syrian Christians who separated from Old Haripad Church. The Old Haripad Church existed from the 7th century but it was demolished in the 11th century as a result half of the parishioners established the Cheppad church and the other half joined the Karthikapally Syrian Church. The Cheppad Syrian Church has many centuries old murals depicting Syrian, Armenian, Ethiopian, Byzantine and traditional Kerala folk painting artworks. It also has an Ethiopian cross.

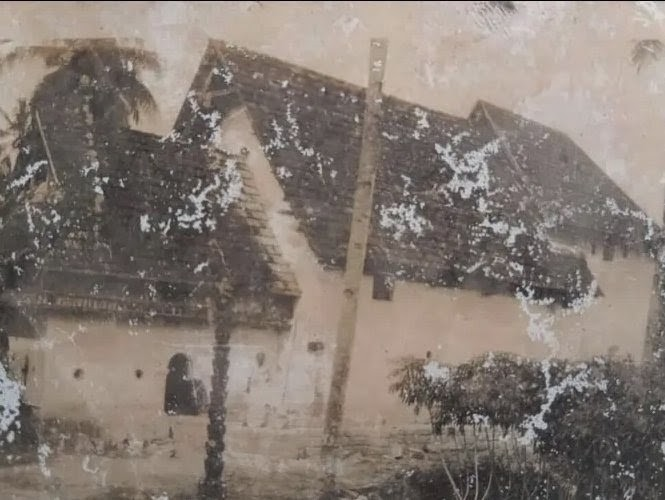
Venmony Martha Mariam Suriyanipally

- Venmony St Mary's Orthodox Syrian Church – The Venmony Church was established in the 11 th century at year AD1017 by the Pandalam Royal family for the Venmony Nasranis who had to travel to the Mavelikkara Puthiyakavu Church.
- Purakkad Mar Sleeva Syro Malabar Church – The Purakkad Mar Sleeva Church was established in 1410 by the ruler of the Chempakassery Kingdom for his Syrian Christian soldiers of Champakulam. Purakkad which developed into a major trading port witnessed significant Syrian Christian migration.
- Thathampally St Michael's Syro Malabar Church, Alappuzha – The Thathampally Syrian Church was established in 1404 by the Alavoor Matham (Naduvazhi) and the native Syrian Christians of Northern Aryanad who were former attendees of the Vadassery Syrian Church.

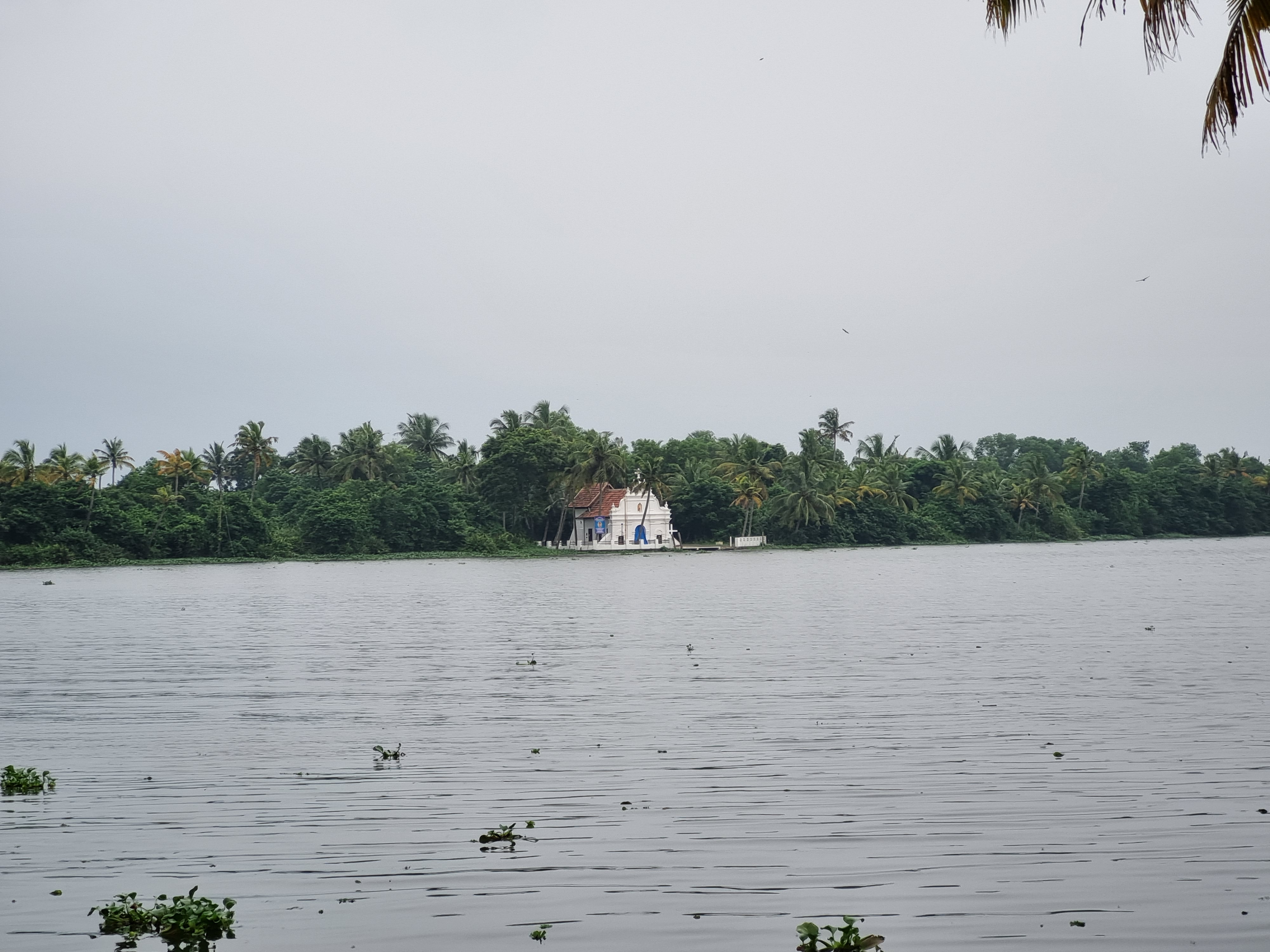
Mattel Mar Thoma Sleeha Suriyanipally

- Mattel St Thomas Syro Malabar Church, Pallippuram – The Mattel Syrian Church was established before the 15th century at the place where the Saint Thomas Cross which sank in the Vembanad Lake at Gokkamangalam was found.

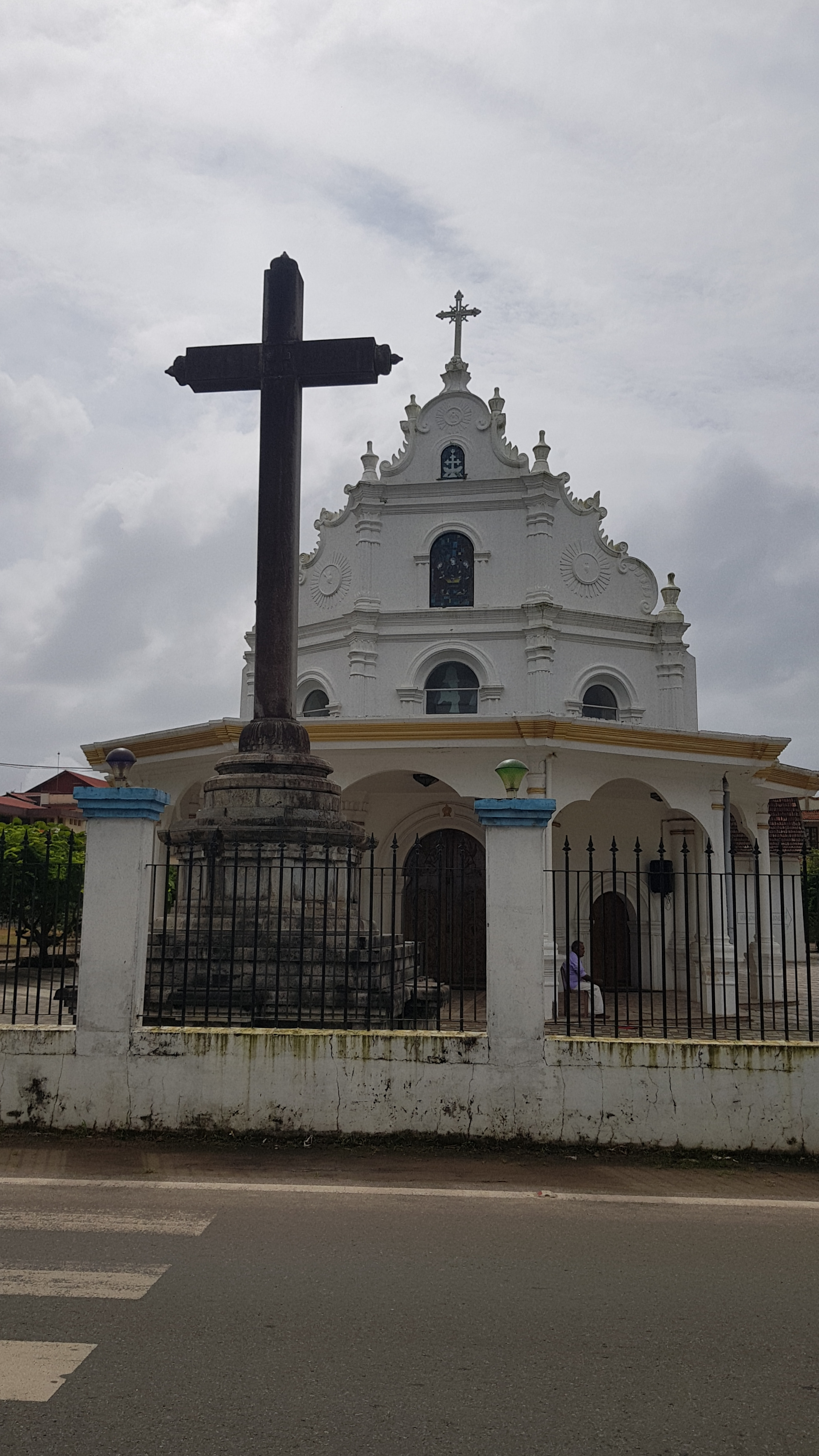
Alappuzha Pazhavangadi Mar Sleeva Suriyanipally

- Pazhavanangadi Mar Sleeva Forane Syro Malabar Church, Alappuzha – The Pazhavanangadi Syrian Church built in 1400 AD by the local Syrian Christians who separated from the Champakulam Kalloorkad Church.

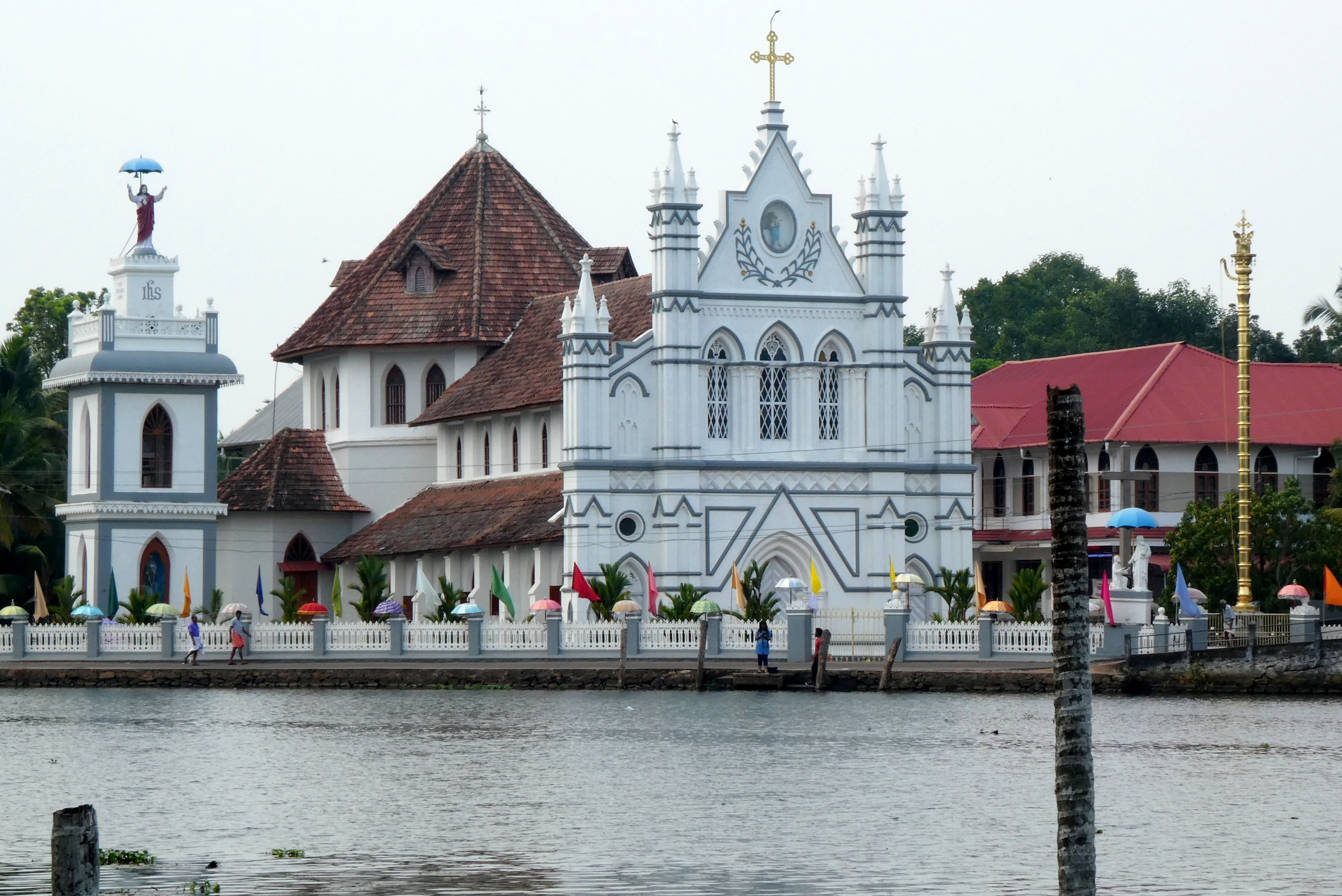
Pulinkunnoo Martha Mariam Suriyanipally

- St. Mary's Forane Church, Pulinkunnoo – The Pulinkunnu Syrian Church was established in 1557 by the Syrian Christians of Pulinkunnu, Alappuzha who separated from the Champakulam Kalloorkad Church.
- Kallissery St Mary's Orthodox Syrian Knanaya Valiyapally – The Kallissery Knanaya Valiyapally was established in 1580 by the Knananites who separated from the Chengannur Old Syrian Church and the Knanaya Syrians who migrated from Kodungallur due to a war between the Syrian Christians and Muslim Mappilas of Kodungallur.

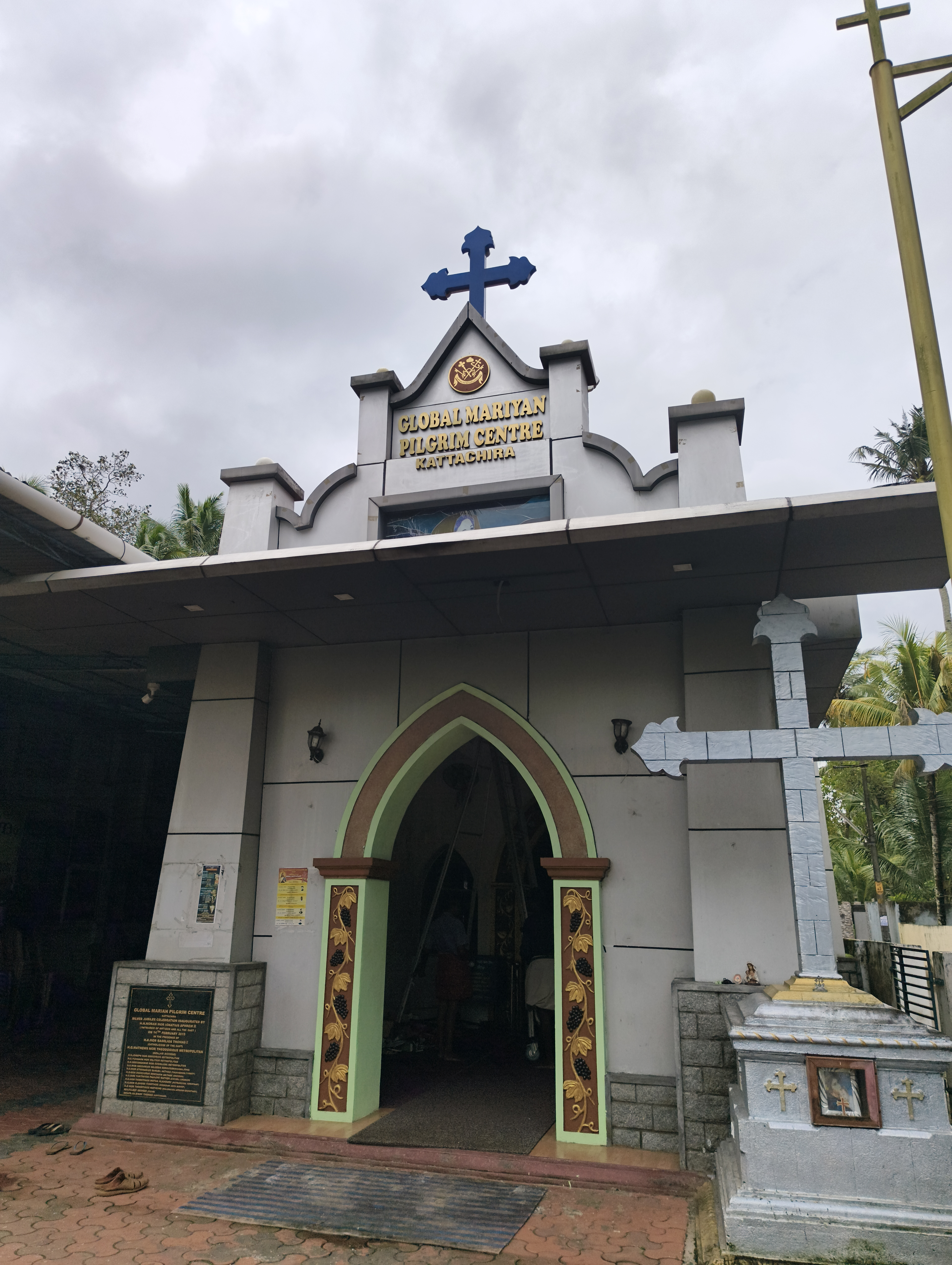
Kattachira Global Marian Pilgrim Church

- Kattachira Church - Kattachira Church is administered by Jacobite Syrian Christian Church, Proclaimed Global Marian Pilgrim Centre. In this church, Aromatic oil flowed from the Icon of the Mother of God, Syriac Orthodox Patriarch bull, Prayer book and Holy Cross.

== Pathanamthitta district ==
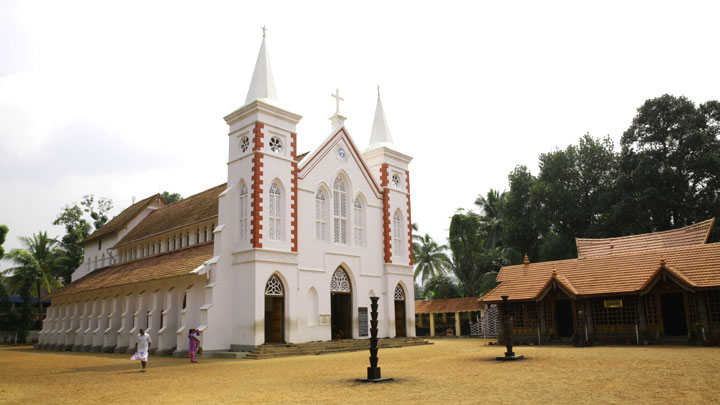
Niranam Martha Mariam Suriyanipally

- Niranam St Mary's Orthodox Syrian Church – The ancient Niranam Syrian church was founded by Thomas the Apsotle in 54 AD and is among the Ezharappallikal. Later many Syrian Christians migrated from Niranam to places like Chengannur, Mavelikkara, Kallooppara, Champakulam, Changanassery and other regions in the present Pathanamthitta and Alappuzha district.

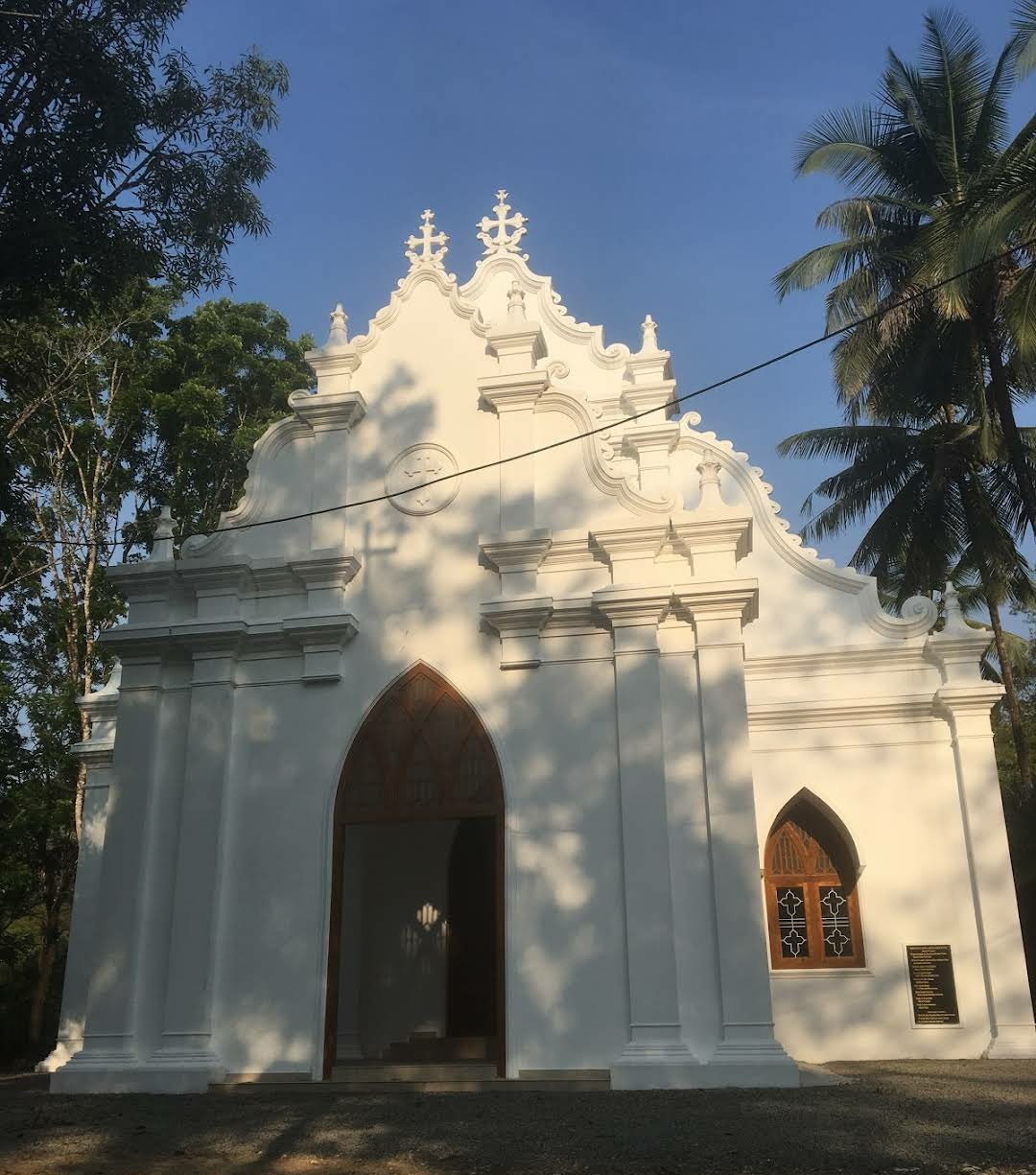
Nilakkal (Chayal) Mar Thoma Sleeha Suriyanipally

- Nilackal St Thomas Ecumenical Syrian Church – The Nilackal (Chayal) Church in Angamoozhy was established by Thomas the Apostle in 54 AD and is among the Ezharappallikal. The Syrian Christians of Nilakkal had migrated to nearby regions of Kadampanad, Adoor, Thumpamon and Chengannur between the 2nd and the 8th centuries. According to tradition many Tamil Brahmins, Vellalars and Chettiars were converted by St Thomas the apostle in the Coromandel coast (Mylapore, Kayalpattanam). These converts from Coromandel later flocked towards the Syrian Christian strongholds in Kerala like Nilakkal(Chayal) and Kollam in the 2nd century following persecution. Nilakkal was an important trading city in the erstwhile Chera Kingdom and had flourishing trade with the Pandya Kingdom of Madurai. In the 10th century Pandalam and Poonjar dynasties branched off from the Pandyan Kingdom and established themselves in Kerala, Nilakkal being part of Pandalam. The decline of Nilackal initiated in the early 12th century when Maravarman Kulasekara Pandyan I conquered Quilon, as Nilackal was the passage between Chera-Pandya it was sacked. This influenced Pandyan bandits and plunderers led by Vikramanpuli Thevar (Vakrapuli) and Paraiya pattam (Perumpatta) to loot Nilackal early in the 12th century. The 2nd Pandyan Civil War between Veera Pandya and Sundara Pandya along with invasion of the Delhi Sultanate led General Malik Kafur in the early 1300s further aggravated the misery of Nilakkal. The city was looted and torched and nothing remained of it. The Nilakkal church was burned and the Syrian Christians of Nilakkal migrated to regions like Kanjirappally, Poonjar, Aruvithura, Ranni, Vadasserikara, Vaipur and Erumeli and other parts of present Meenachil. The Great Flood Of 1341 destroyed what was left of Nilakkal, completely wiping out its existence.

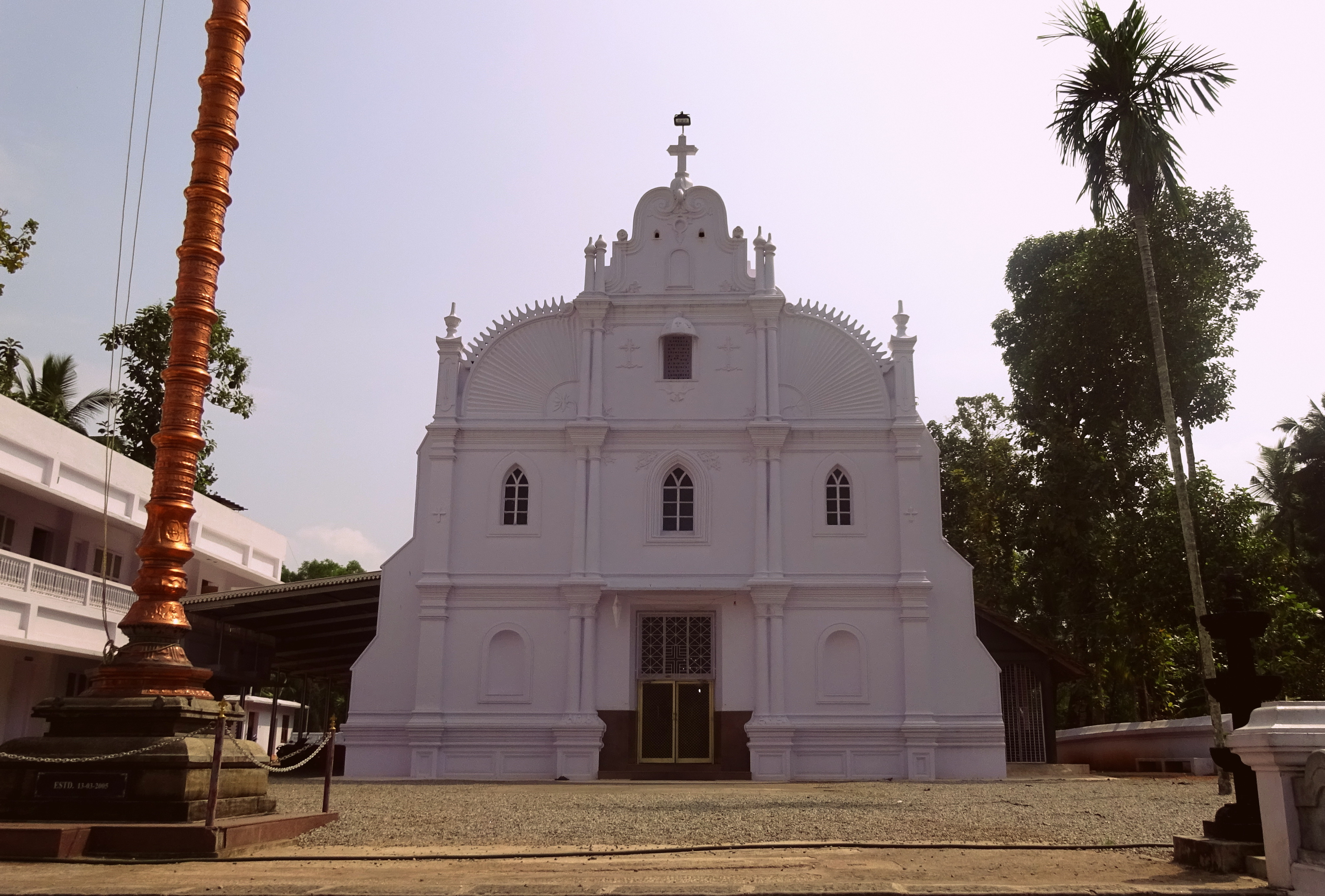
Kadampanad Mar Thoma Sleeha Suriyanipally

- Kadampanad St Thomas Syrian Orthodox Cathedral – In the beginning of the fourth century, a group of Syrian Christians from Chayal (Nilackal) near Ranni migrated to Kadampanad. They consecrated a church at Kadampanad in accordance with Syrian tradition and rituals in 325 AD, in the name of Mar Thoma Sleeha (Thomas the Apostle). The descendants of those who settled in Kadampanad later migrated to Mavelikkara, Kayamkulam, Kollakadavu, Adoor, Kozhenchery, Kaippattoor, Sooranadu, Kallada and Koodal.

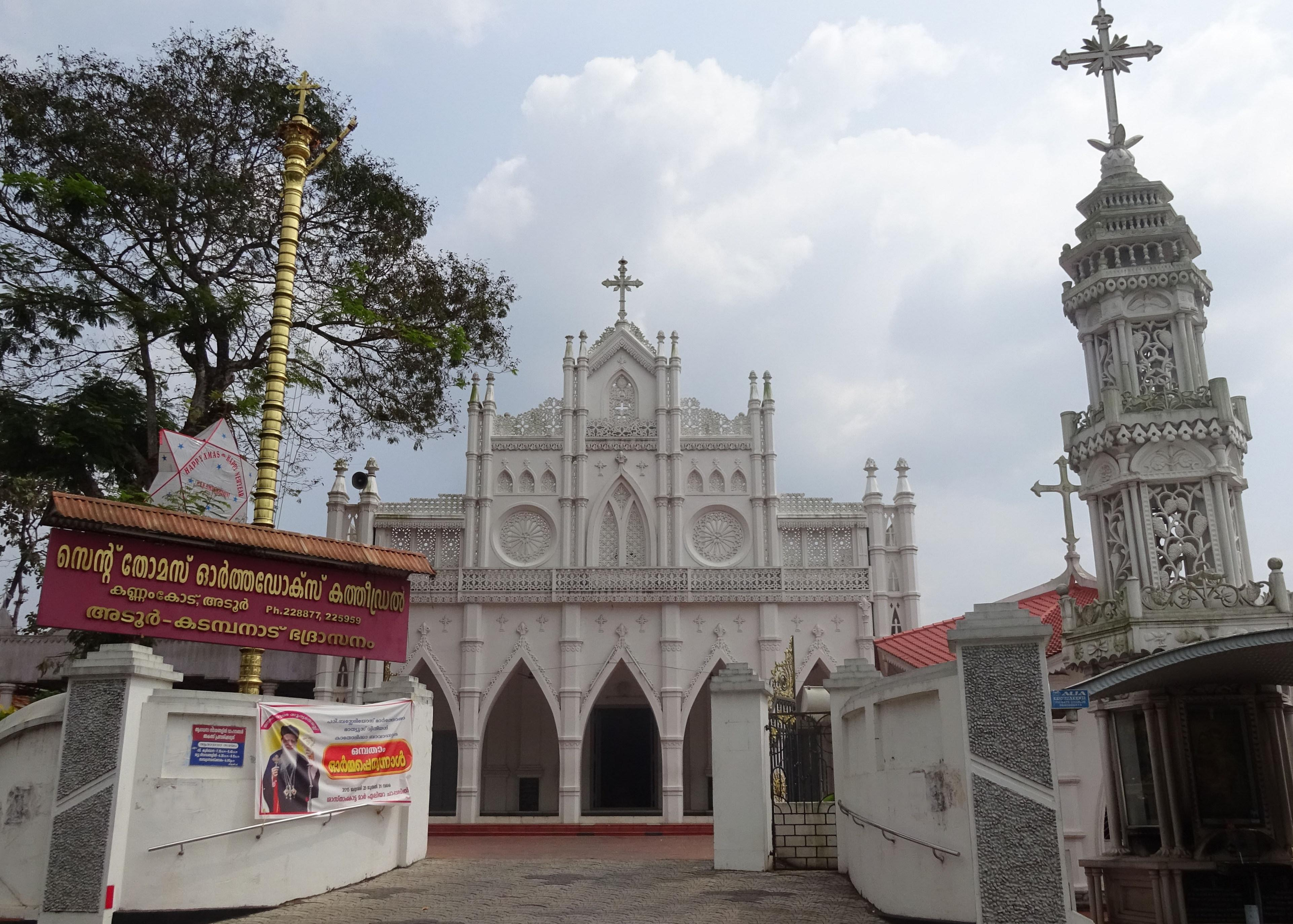
Adoor Kannamcode Mar Thoma Sleeha Suriyanipally

- Adoor Kannamcode St Thomas Orthodox Syrian Cathedral – The earliest Syrian Christian settlement near Kannamcode in Adoor was at the beginning of 4th century, during the establishment of Kadampanad Church. The Kannamcode Syrian Church was established by the parishioners of Kadampanad Syrian Church in the 4th century.

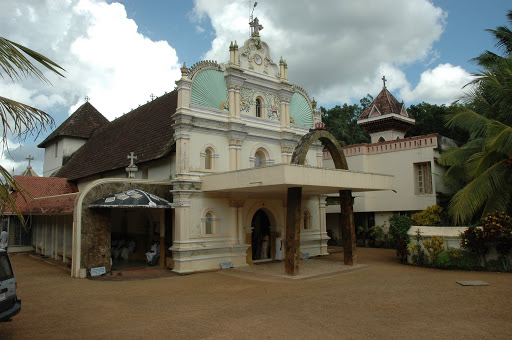
Thumpamon Martha Mariam Suriyanipally

- Thumpamon St Mary's Orthodox Syrian Valiyapally – The first church in Thumpamon was built in 717 AD by the Syrian Christians who migrated from Nilakkal and the Syrian Christians of Thumbamon who separated from the Niranam Church in the land donated by the Pandalam Kingdom.
- Vaipur St Mary's Syro-Malabar Church – The Vaipur Church was established in 1212 by the Syrian Christians of Vaipur who formerly attended the Niranam Church for worship. Later many Syrian Christians migrated to Vaipur in the 14th century from Nilakkal.

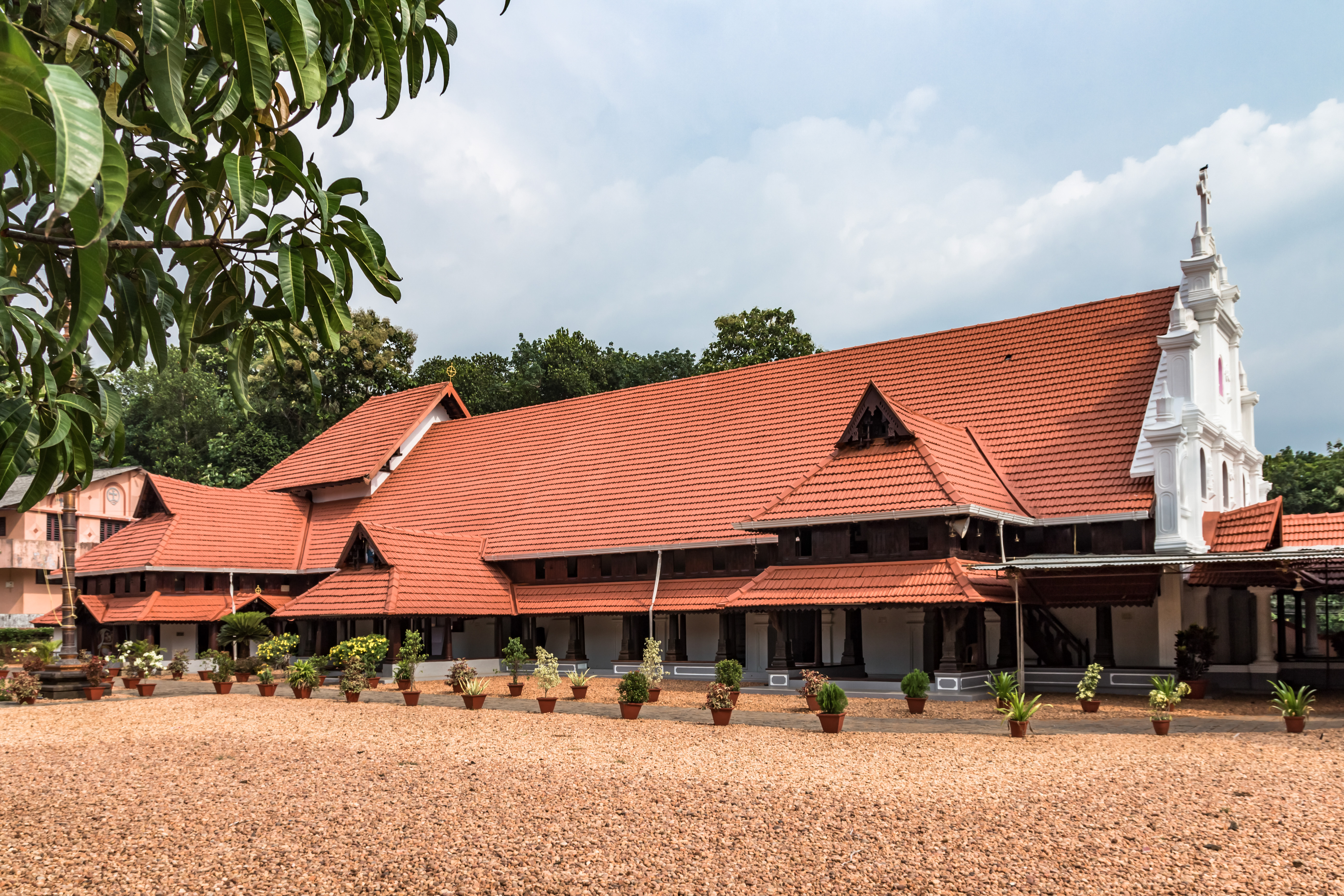
Kallooppara Martha Mariam Suriyanipally

- Kallooppara St Mary's Syrian Orthodox Church – The Kallooppara Syrian Church was established in 1339 by the Aaruveedan families and the Edappally Swaroopam of Thekkumkur for the Syrian Christians of Kallooppara who attended the Niranam St Mary's Syrian Church.

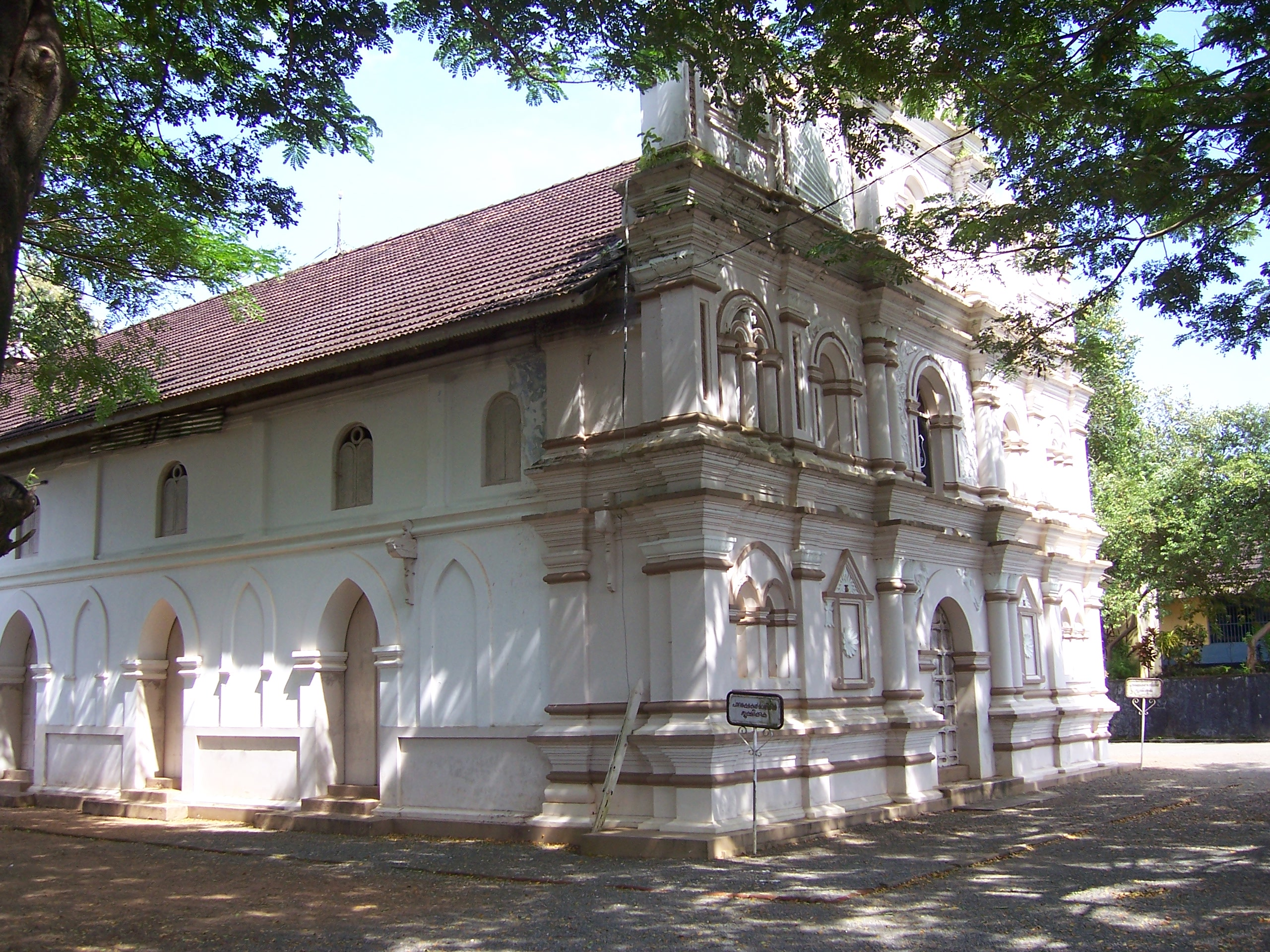
Maramon Marthoma Suriyanipally

- Maramon Mar Thoma Syrian Church – The Maramon Mar Thoma Church was established in 1440 by the Malieakal, Ramacham and Kulathackal Syrian Christian families who formerly worshiped in the Niranam Syrian Church.
- Omallur St Thomas Orthodox Syrian Valiyapally – Omallur Valiyapally was established in 1573 by the Koyikkal Thampuran and Pandalam dynasty for the Syrian Christians of Omallur who were parishioners of the Thumpamon Syrian Church.

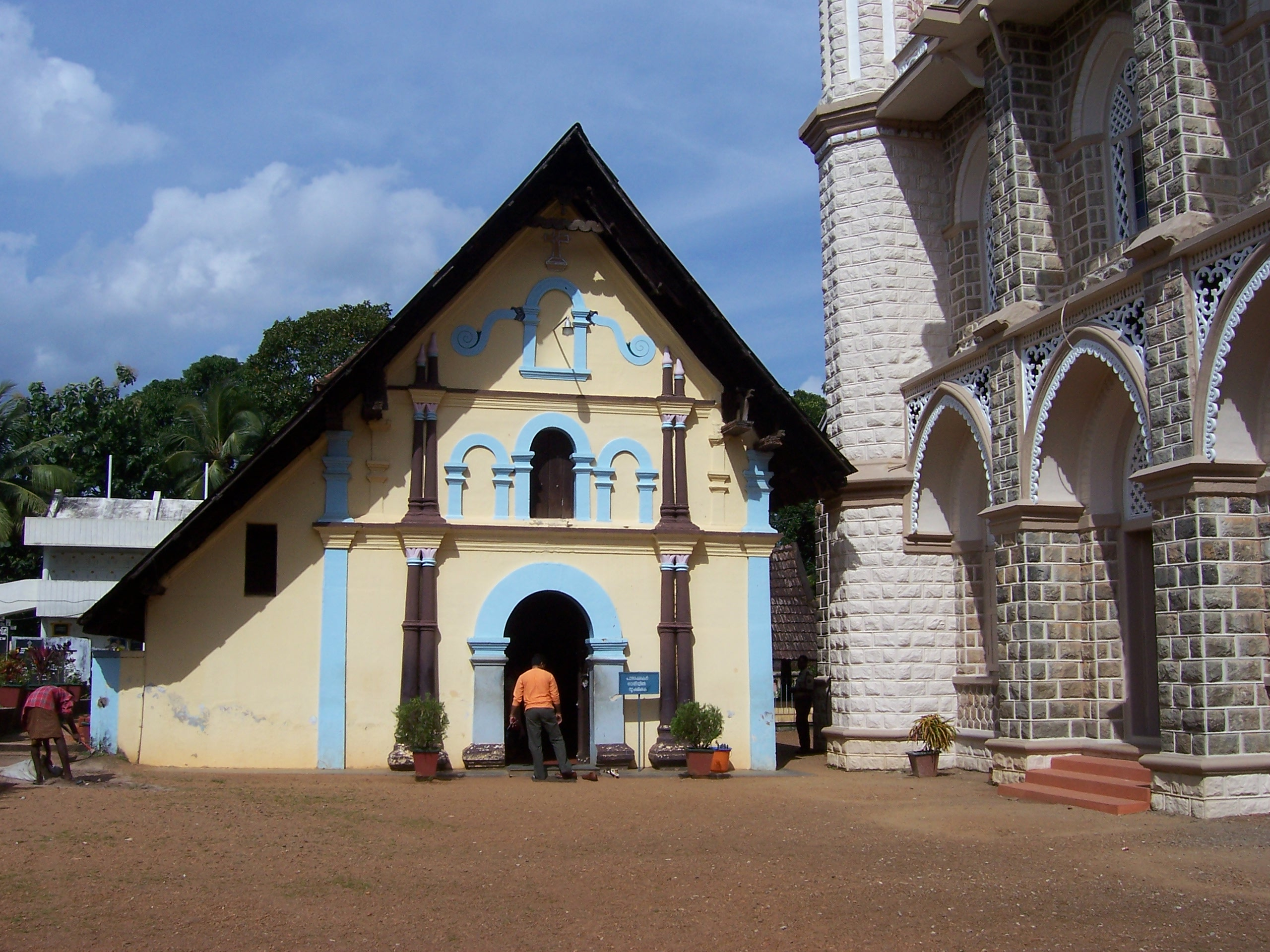
Kozhencherry Mar Thoma Sleeha Suriyanipally

- Kozhenchery St Thomas Mar Thoma Syrian Church – Certain ancient Christian families who resided on the banks of river Pampa have recorded their origins and this evidence indicates that the early Christian settlers around Kozhencherry worshiped in the churches at Maramon and Chengannur. According to these records, the earliest church at Kozhencherry was constructed in 1599, according to the Malayalam Era (M.E. 775).

== Kollam district ==
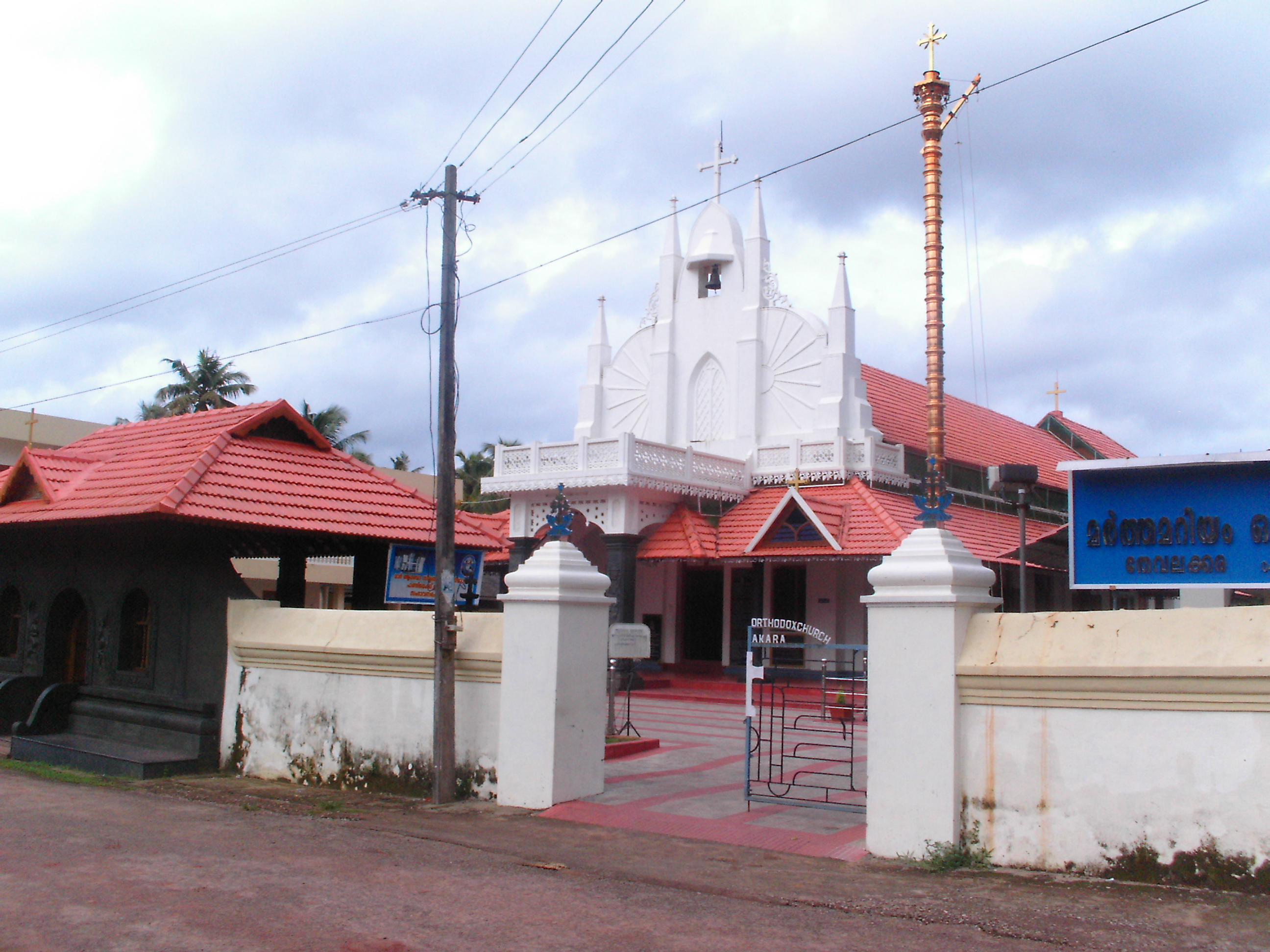
Thevalakkara Martha Mariam Suriyanipally

- Thevalakkara Martha Mariam Orthodox Syrian Church – Thomas the Apostle established a church in Kollam in 54 AD. The church was lost to sea erosion in the 4th century. It was rebuilt in the 4th century in Thevelakkara, near Kollam. Later Mar Abo and Mar Aphroth from Nineveh in Iraq travelled to Kollam and rebuilt the church again at Thevelakkara for the Syrian Christian community in 825. Thevalakkara had also received the Tharissaykal, Syrian Christians of Thiruvithamcode who had migrated to Kerala. According to tradition many Tamil Brahmins, Vellalars and Chettiars were converted by St Thomas the apostle in the Coromandel coast near Mylapore, these converts from the Coromandel coast later flocked towards the Syrian Christian strongholds in Kerala like Nilakkal(Chayal) and Kollam.

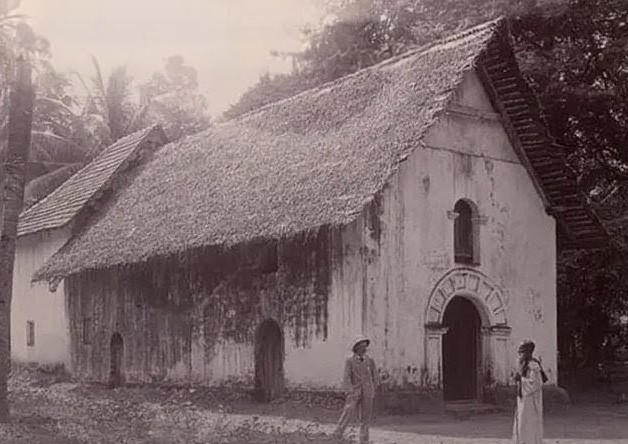
Kollam Mar Sabor Mar Aphroth Kadeesha Suriyanipally

- Kollam Kadeesha Orthodox Syrian Church – The Kollam Kadeesha Syrian Church also known as Tharisappally/Tharisappalli Church was established in 823 AD by the Persian Saints Mar Sapor and Mar Aphroth. The Tharisappally Quilon Syrian Copper Plates were issued for this church. Many Syrian Christians from Thiruvithamcode, known as Tharissaykal had migrated to Kollam. The St Thomas converts from mylapore in the coromandel coast also migrated to Syrian Christian strongholds in Kerala like Kollam and Nilakkal.

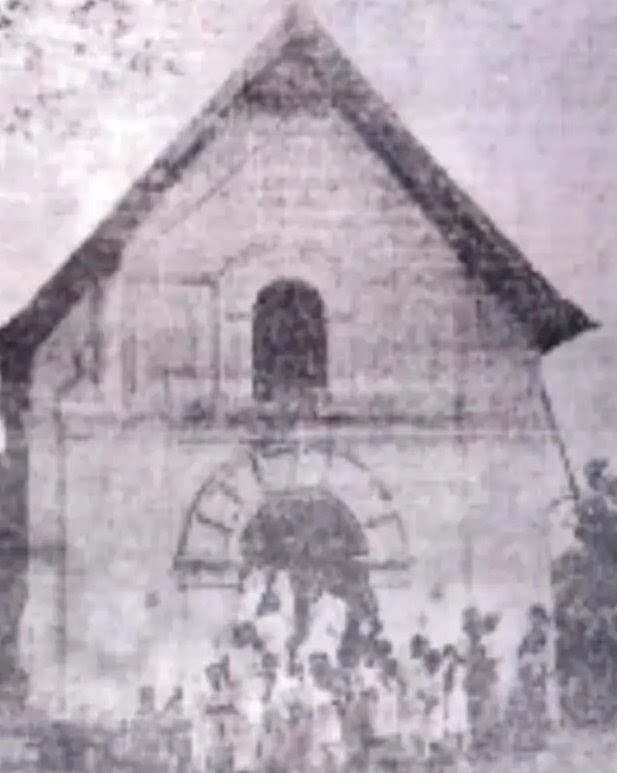
St. Mary's Orthodox Syrian Church, Kallada

- St. Mary's Orthodox Syrian Church, Kallada – The Kallada Church was established in the 9th century by Persian traders Mar Sabor and Mar Proth for the Syrian Christians of Kallada who attended the Thevalakkara Syrian Church. Later in the 12th century many Syrian Christians migrated to Kallada from Kollam and Kadampanad. The tomb of Mar Anthrayos Bava (Kallada Valyappooppan) who arrived in 1678 is in the Kallada Syrian Church. The first Church in Kallada was destroyed by internecine feud between the Karthas of east Kallada and west Kallada and a matriarch of Thulassery Manapurathu Syrian family recovered the cross of the destroyed Church from the river and prevailed on Avani Rajni (Queen of west Kallada) to allot some land for building a new Church. She was won over by handsome gifts of precious stones by the members of Thulassery Manapurathu Tharavad. The Kallada St Mary's ValiyaPalli also known as Thulassery Manapurathu Marthamariyam Church was established by the descendants of the West Asian migration to Kollam in 9th century AD.

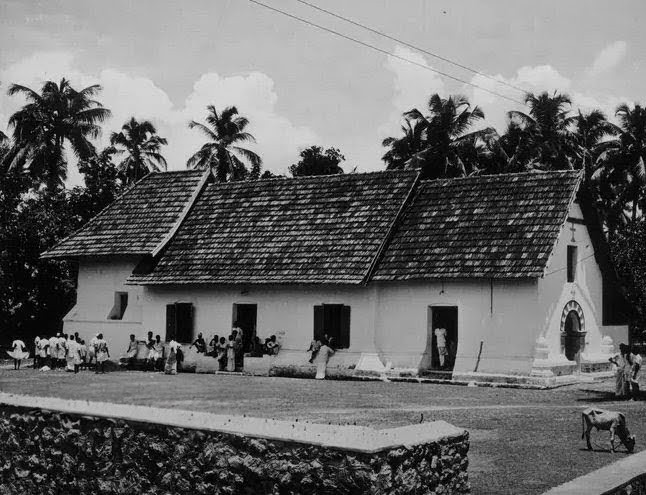
Kundara Mar Thoma Sleeha Suriyanipally

- Kundara St Thomas Orthodox Syrian Valiyapally – The St. Thomas Valiyapally in Kundara was established in 835 AD by Mar Sabor and Mar Aphroth and the Eliyedath Rajah of Kottarakkara for the Syrian Christians of Kundara who formerly attended the Kollam Kadeesha Syrian Church and the Thevalakkara church.

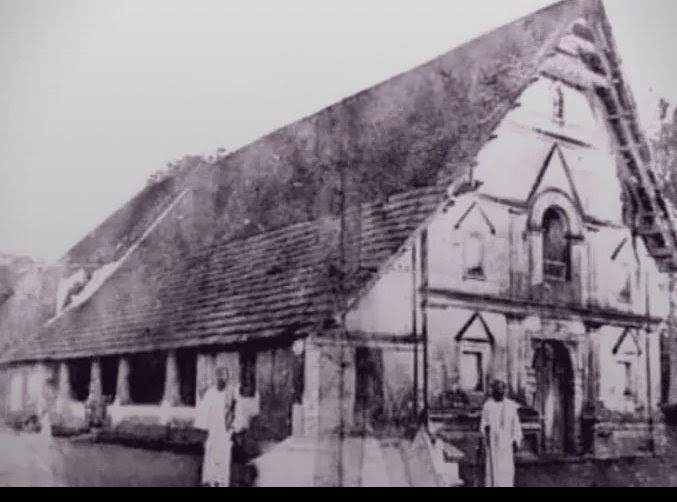
Kottarakkara Marthoma Suriyanipally

- Kottarakkara Marthoma Syrian Church – The Kottarakara Old Syrian Church was built in the 13th century by the ruler of the Elayedath Swaroopam, (a branch of the Venad Kingdom) for the Nasranis of Kottarakara who had to rely on the Kundara Syrian Church and for the Nasrani merchants who were invited to Kottarakara from Thekkumkur by the Elayedath Rajah.

== Sources ==
- Karukaparambil, George (2005). Marganitha Kynanaitha: Knanaya Pearl. Deepika Book House.
- Menon, A. Sreedhara (1962). Kerala District Gazetteers: Trichur, Kerala, Volume 7. Superintendent of Govt. Presses.
- Malekandathil, Pius (2020). "Angamali and the St. Thomas Christians: An Historical Overview". NSC Network.
- Whitehouse, Richard (1873). Lingerings of Light in a Dark Land: Being Researches Into the Past History and Present Condition of the Syrian Church of Malabar. Kessinger Publishing. ISBN 116492317X.
