= The Amazing Race Australia 7 =

Season of television series

- Season 7
- Presented by: Beau Ryan
- No. of teams: 11
- Winners: Alli Simpson & Angie Simpson; Darren McMullen & Tristan Dougan; Emma Watkins & Hayley Watkins
- No. of legs: 12
- Distance traveled: 10,000 km (6,200 mi)
- No. of episodes: 12

Release
- Original network: Network 10
- Original release: 4 October – 9 November 2023

Additional information
- Filming dates: 8 June – 2 July 2023

Series chronology
- ← Previous; Season 6 Next → Celebrity Edition 2

The Amazing Race Australia 7, also known as The Amazing Race Australia: Celebrity Edition, is the seventh season of The Amazing Race Australia, an Australian reality competition show based on the American series The Amazing Race and the fourth instalment of Network 10's iteration of the show. Hosted by Beau Ryan, it featured eleven teams of two, each with a pre-existing relationship and including at least one celebrity contestant, in a race across Asia to win the grand prize of A$100,000 for the winners' chosen charity.

This season focused on Asia, with three countries visited and over 10,000 kilometres (6,200 mi) travelled over twelve legs. Starting in Delhi, racers travelled through India, Malaysia and Cambodia before finishing in Kuala Lumpur. New elements introduced in this season include an international finish line. The season premiered on 4 October 2023 with the finale airing on 9 November 2023.

In a worldwide Amazing Race first, three teams won the race: Daughter and mum Alli & Angie Simpson, uncle and nephew Darren McMullen & Tristan Dougan and sisters Emma & Haley Watkins all won the race after agreeing to step on the Finish Line mat together to split the grand prize for each team's charity. In this split victory, Emma & Hayley Watkins and Alli & Angie Simpson became the first all-female teams to win The Amazing Race Australia.

== Production ==
=== Development and filming ===
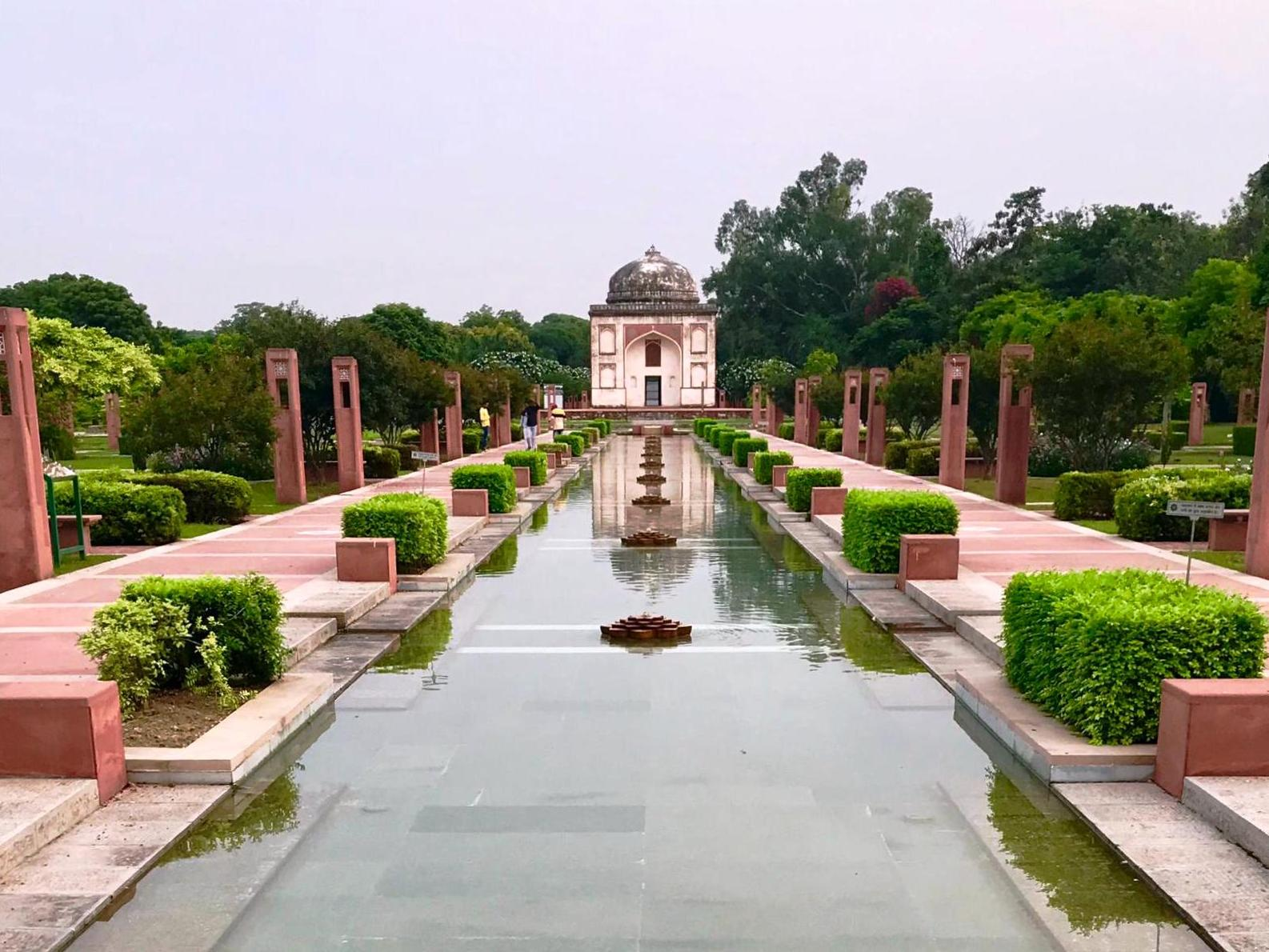
The Amazing Race Australia: Celebrity Edition began at Sunder Nursery in Delhi, India.

During the airing of the previous season, Beau Ryan stated in an interview that he believed that there would eventually be a celebrity season. On 28 April 2023, Network 10 announced that The Amazing Race Australia was renewed and that a new season would be airing in late 2023. Two days later, the network announced that the season would feature celebrity contestants.

Filming for the Celebrity Edition began on 8 June 2023 in Delhi, India with the cast announced on the subsequent day. The fifth season was initially set to visit India; however, plans were cancelled due to the COVID-19 pandemic. The show filmed in Agra on 9 June. This season included a first-time visit to Malaysia with racers spotted in Penang, Malaysia on 17 June. Filming wrapped in early July in Kuala Lumpur.

=== Casting ===
Former AFL player Warwick Capper was rumoured to have been set to compete with his son Indiana; however, he dropped out due to a low booking fee.

== Cast ==
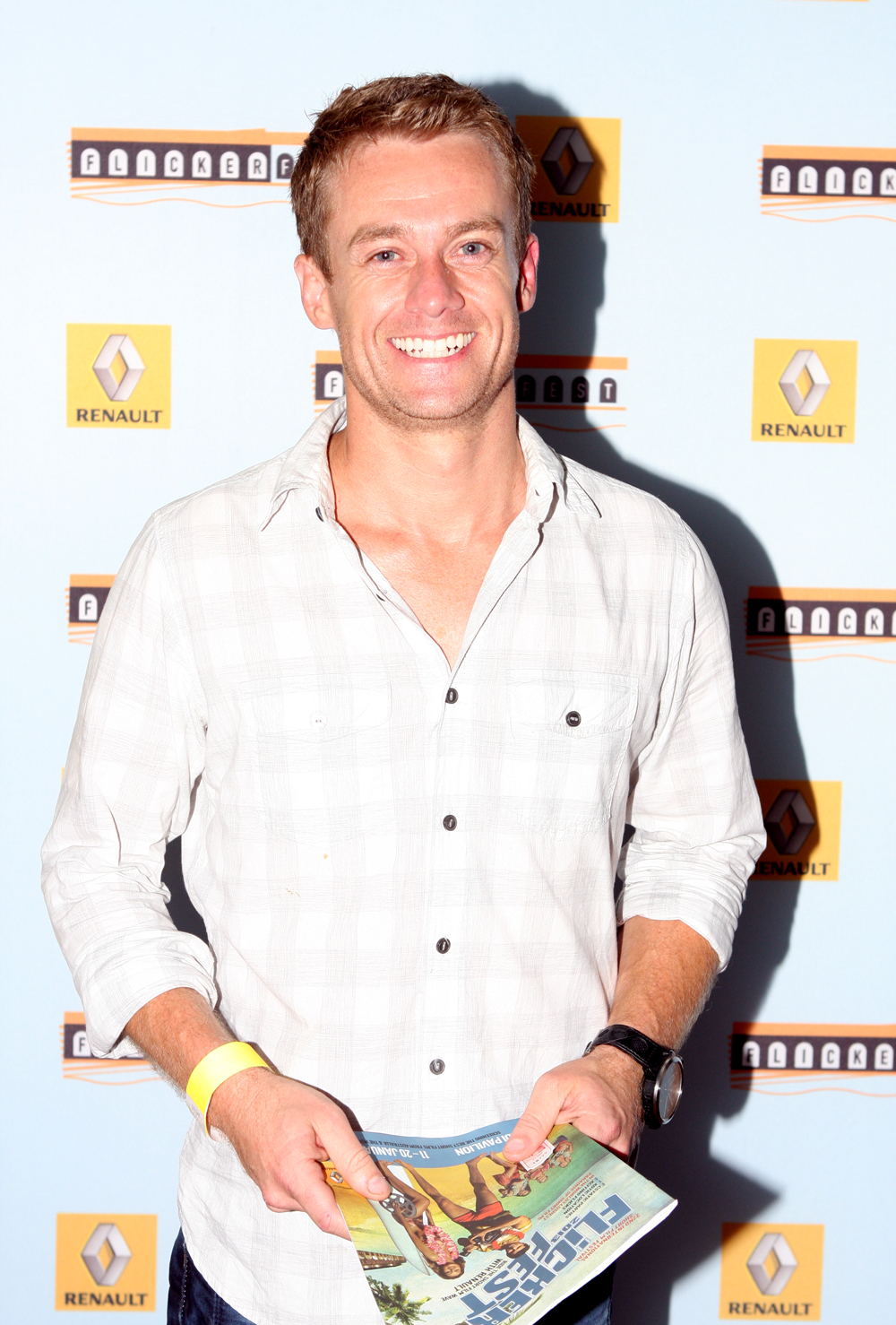
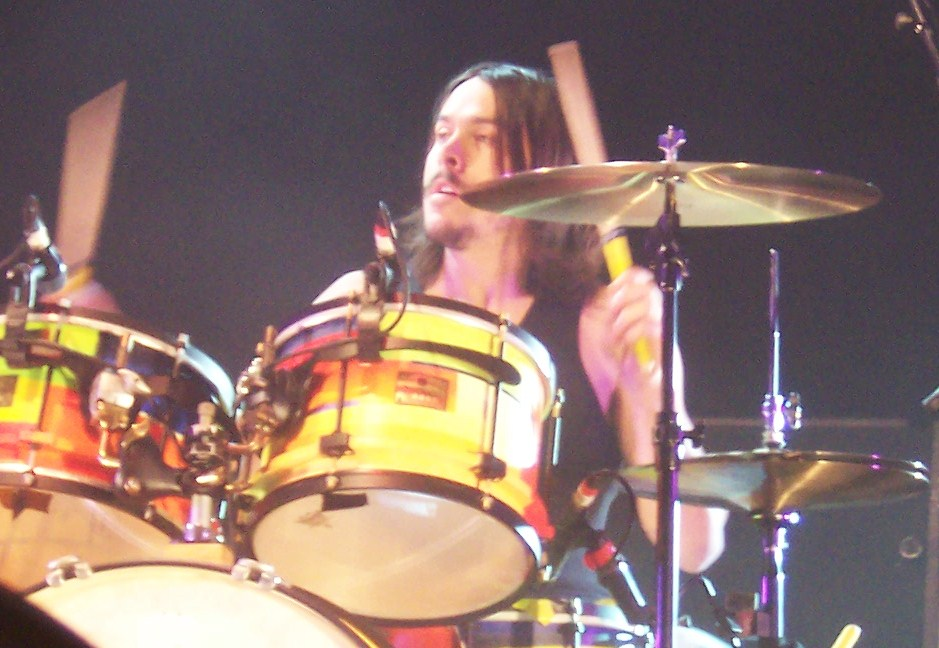
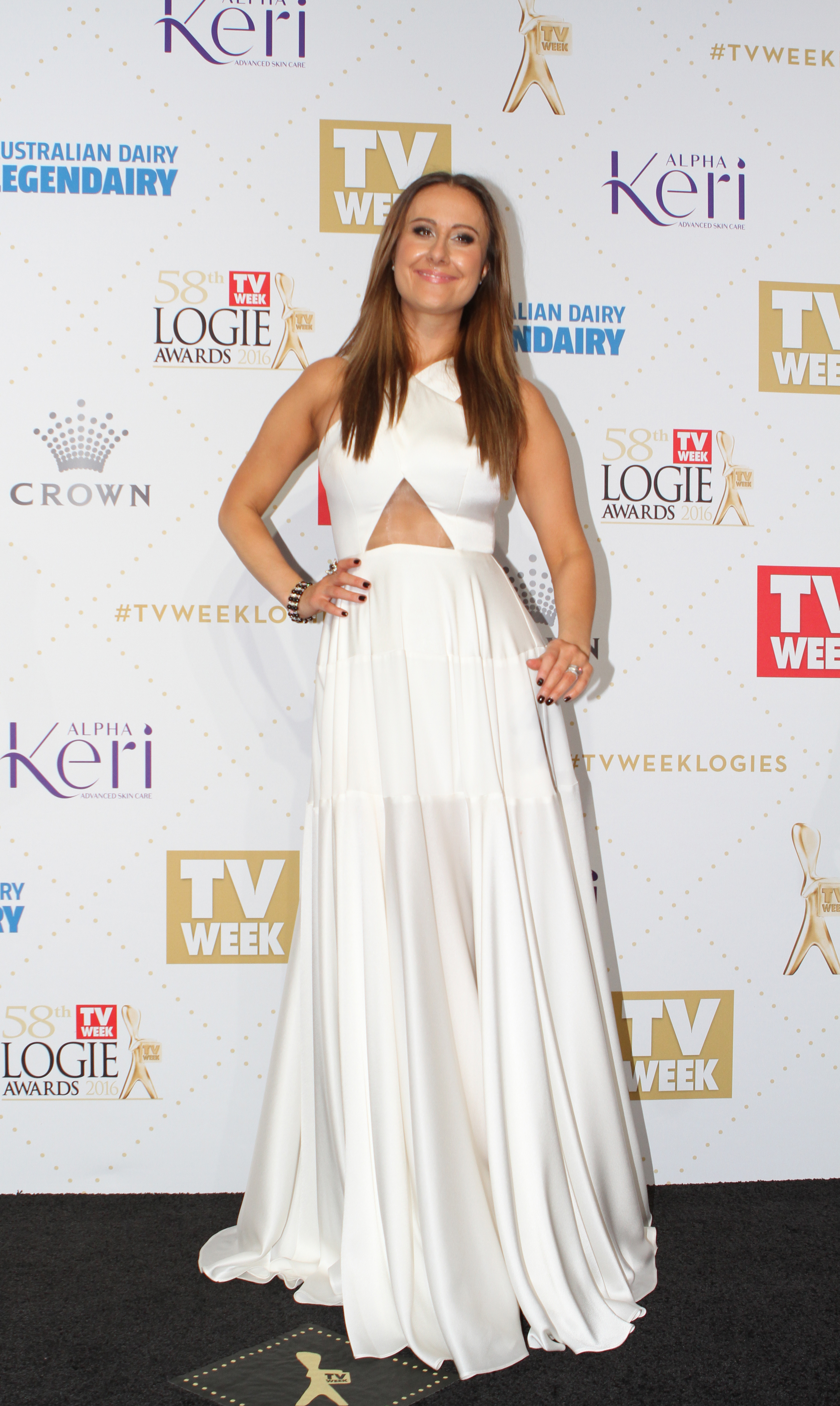
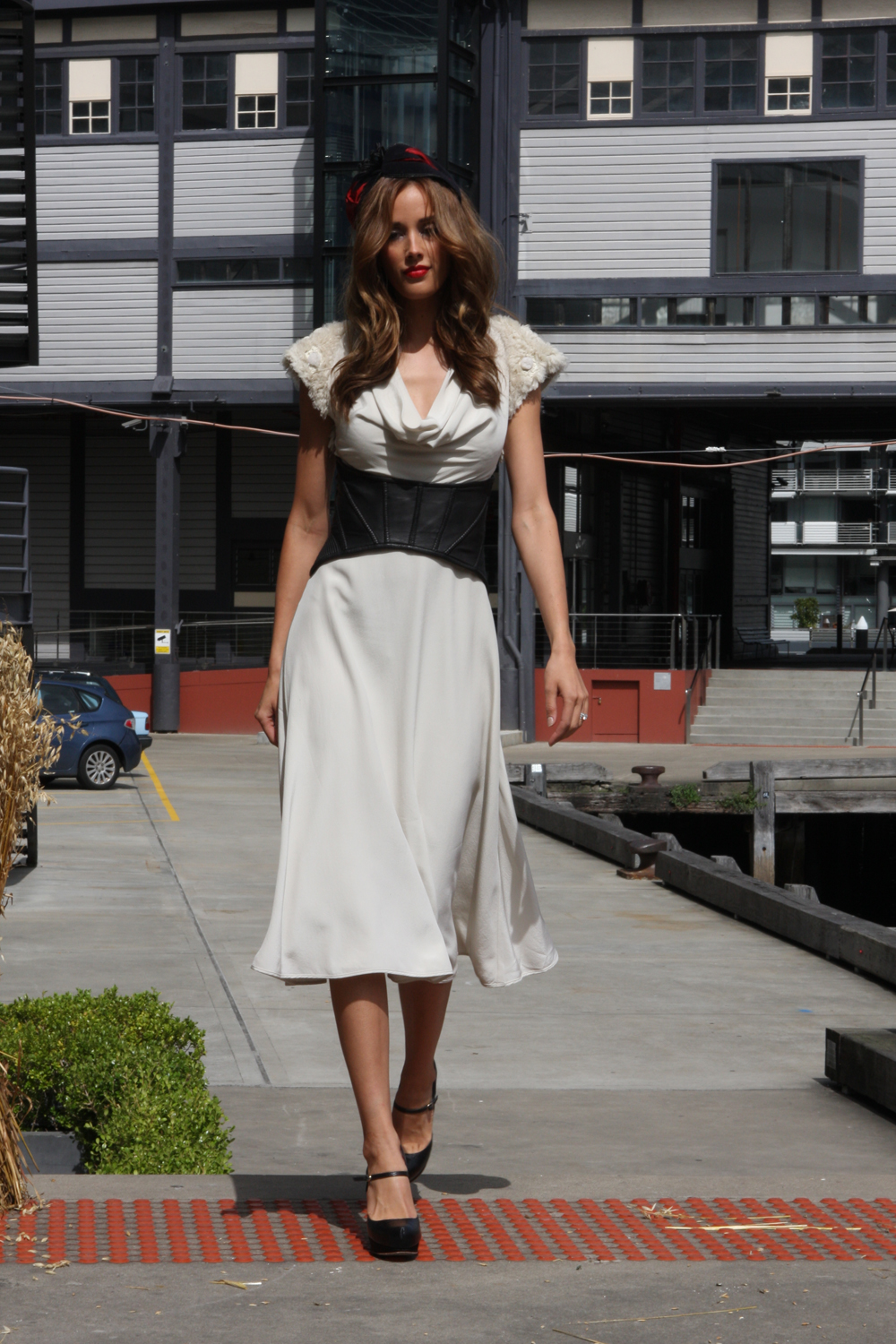
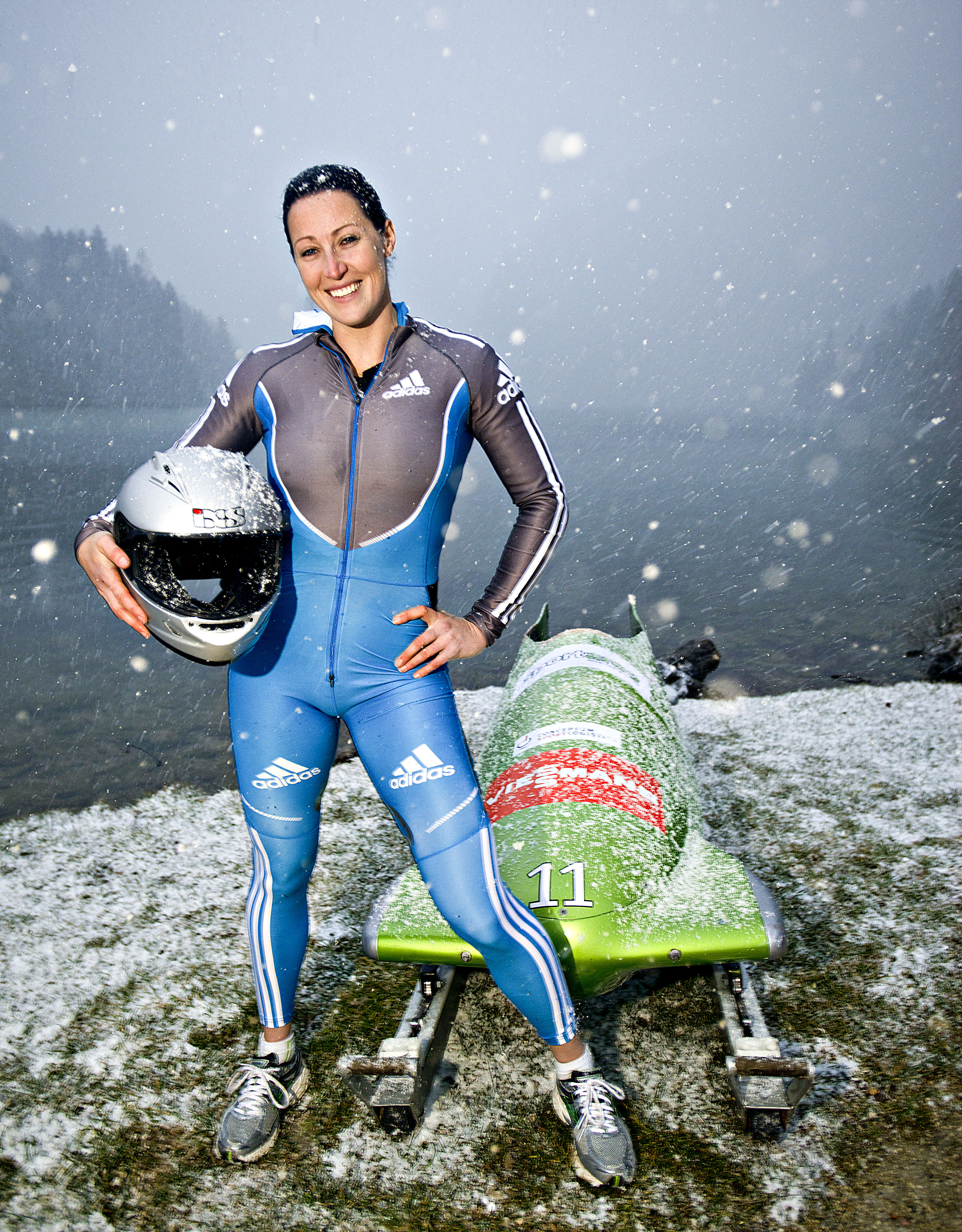
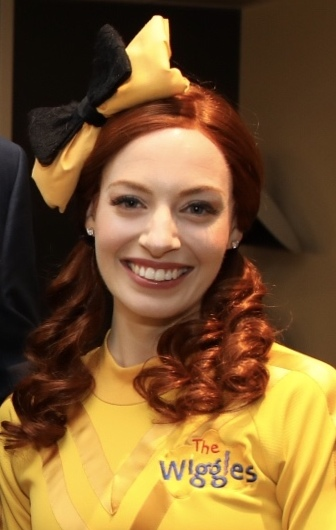
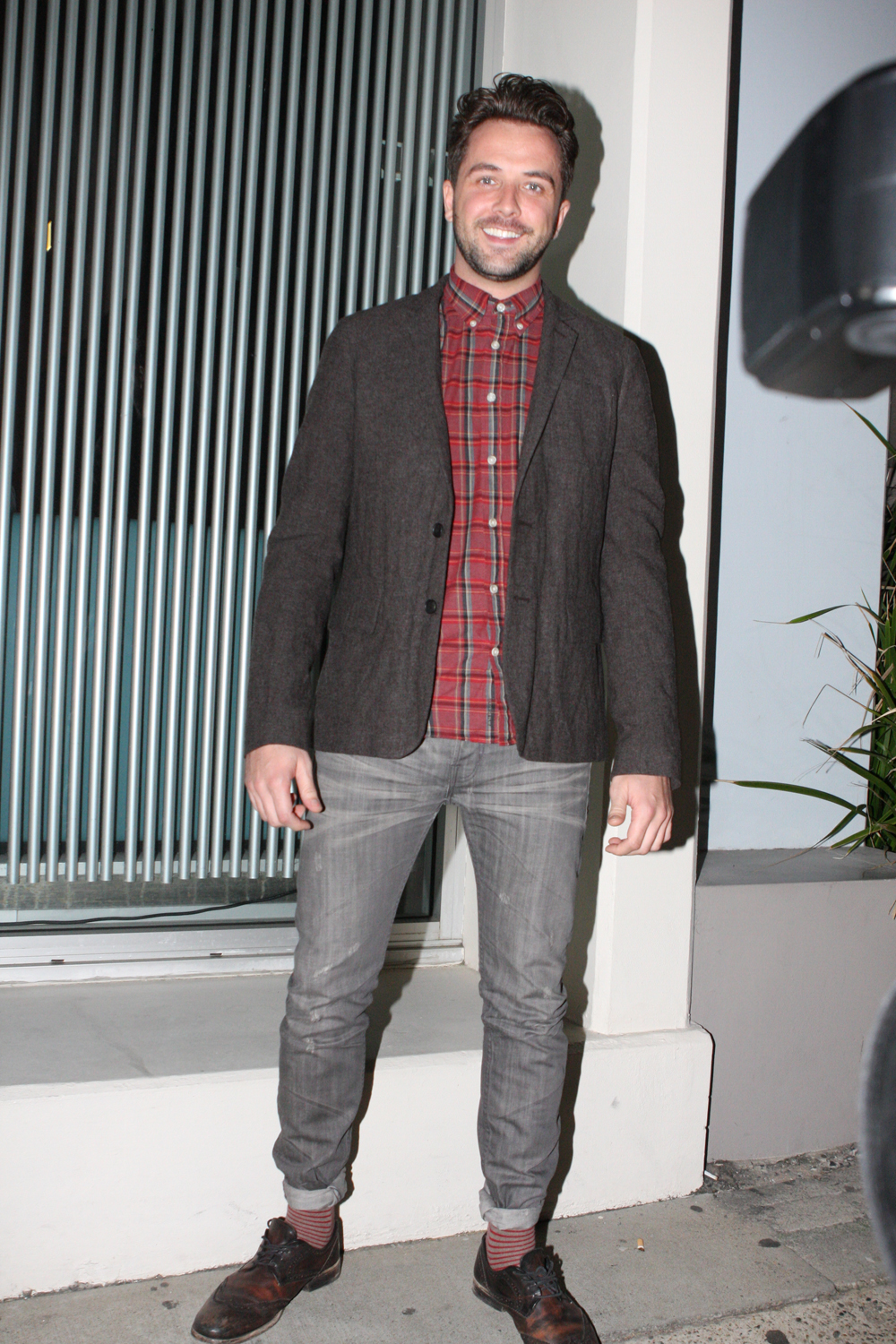
From left to right: Grant Denyer, Ben Gillies, Jackie Gillies, Rebecca Judd, Jana Pittman, Emma Watkins and Darren McMullen

The cast consisted of celebrities and their relatives and friends.

Contestants	Notability	Age	Relationship	Charity	Status
Dane Simpson	Comedian	40	Son & dad	Dharriwaa Elders Group Incorporated	Eliminated 1st (in Delhi, India)
Bow Simpson	—N/a	69	Son & dad	Dharriwaa Elders Group Incorporated	Eliminated 1st (in Delhi, India)
Grant Denyer	Television presenter	45	Husband & wife	Lifeline Central West	Eliminated 2nd (in Agra, India)
Cheryl "Chezzi" Denyer	—N/a	43	Husband & wife	Lifeline Central West	Eliminated 2nd (in Agra, India)
Peter Rowsthorn	Comedian & actor	60	Dad & daughter	All Stars for Autism	Eliminated 3rd (in Langkawi, Malaysia)
Frankie Rowsthorn	—N/a	20	Dad & daughter	All Stars for Autism	Eliminated 3rd (in Langkawi, Malaysia)
Ben Gillies	Musician	43	Husband & wife	Moira Kelly Creating Hope Foundation	Eliminated 4th (in George Town, Malaysia)
Jackie Gillies	Real Housewife of Melbourne	42	Husband & wife	Moira Kelly Creating Hope Foundation	Eliminated 4th (in George Town, Malaysia)
George Mladenov	Two-Time Australian Survivor contestant	33	Siblings	Bankstown Women's Health Centre	Eliminated 5th (in George Town, Malaysia)
Pam Mladenov	—N/a	24	Siblings	Bankstown Women's Health Centre	Eliminated 5th (in George Town, Malaysia)
Rebecca "Bec" Judd	Model, presenter & WAG	40	Sisters	Impatient Advocacy - A Nicole Cooper Foundation	Eliminated 6th (in Siem Reap, Cambodia)
Kate Twigley	—N/a	38	Sisters	Impatient Advocacy - A Nicole Cooper Foundation	Eliminated 6th (in Siem Reap, Cambodia)
Jana Pittman	Olympian	40	Mum & son	Royal Hospital for Women	Eliminated 7th (in Siem Reap, Cambodia)
Cornelis "Cor" Rawlinson	—N/a	16	Mum & son	Royal Hospital for Women	Eliminated 7th (in Siem Reap, Cambodia)
Harry Jowsey	Too Hot to Handle 1 contestant	26	Best mates	Beyond Blue	Eliminated 8th (in Siburan, Malaysia)
Teddy Briggs	Love Island Australia 1 contestant	29	Best mates	Beyond Blue	Eliminated 8th (in Siburan, Malaysia)
Alli Simpson	Model, singer & actress	25	Daughter & mum	Dementia Australia	Winners (Note: The final three teams agreed to step on the finish line mat together and split the charity prize. The teams are ordered based on their arrival at the site of the Finish Line, before they agreed to step on the Finish Mat together.) (in Kuala Lumpur, Malaysia)
Angie Simpson	—N/a	52	Daughter & mum	Dementia Australia	Winners (in Kuala Lumpur, Malaysia)
Emma Watkins	Children's entertainer	33	Sisters	Leonie Jackson Memorial Fund	Winners (in Kuala Lumpur, Malaysia)
Hayley Watkins	—N/a	34	Sisters	Leonie Jackson Memorial Fund	Winners (in Kuala Lumpur, Malaysia)
Darren McMullen	Television presenter	41	Uncle & nephew	Feel the Magic	Winners (in Kuala Lumpur, Malaysia)
Tristan Dougan	—N/a	26	Uncle & nephew	Feel the Magic	Winners (in Kuala Lumpur, Malaysia)

Future appearances

In 2023, Harry Jowsey competed on the thirty-second season of the American version of Dancing with the Stars. Jowsey also competed on the second season of Perfect Match. In 2025, George Mladenov competed on Deal or No Deal. Later in the year, Mladenov competed on Australian Survivor: Australia V The World. In 2026, Jowsey competed on the Hulu show The Mob.

== Results ==
The following teams are listed with their placements in each leg. Placements are listed in finishing order.

- A red placement with a dagger (†) indicates that the team was eliminated.
- An underlined blue placement with a double-dagger (‡) indicates that the team was the last to arrive at a Pit Stop in a non-elimination leg and had to perform a Speed Bump task in the following leg.
- A green ƒ indicates that the team won the Fast Forward.
- A violet + indicates that the teams encountered an Intersection.

Team placement (by leg)
Team	1	2+ (Note: This leg featured an Intersection. The teams were paired up thusly: Jana & Cor and Harry & Teddy, Alli & Angie and Emma & Hayley, Darren & Tristan and Ben & Jackie, Grant & Chezzi and Peter & Frankie, and George & Pam and Bec & Kate.)	3	4	5	6	7	8	9	10	11+ (Note: This leg featured an Intersection. The teams were paired up thusly: Darren & Tristan and Alli & Angie; and Harry & Teddy and Emma & Hayley.)	12
Darren & Tristan	1st	5th	1stƒ	1st	5th	4th	1st	4th	3rd	1st	2nd	1st
Emma & Hayley	3rd	1st	4th	4th	7th	5th	4th	1st	1st	3rd	3rd	1st
Alli & Angie	4th	2nd	6th	6th	1st	2nd	2nd	2nd	4th	4th‡	1st	1st
Harry & Teddy	2nd	3rd	3rd	7th	6th	6th	5th	5th‡	2nd	2nd	4th†	
Jana & Cor	6th	4th	8th	2nd	3rd	1st	3rd	3rd	5th†			
Bec & Kate	10th	8th	5th	3rd	2nd	3rd	6th† (Note: Bec & Kate initially arrived 3rd at the Pit Stop; however, they were issued a one hour penalty for skipping the Roadblock. All of the other teams checked in during this penalty time, dropping Bec & Kate to last.)					
George & Pam	5th	7th	9th‡	8th	4th	7th†						
Ben & Jackie	7th	6th	2nd	5th	8th†							
Peter & Frankie	9th	9th	7th	9th†								
Grant & Chezzi	8th	10th†										
Dane & Bow	11th†											

== Race summary ==
Destinations	Air travel Rail travel Water travel Bus travel Helicopter travel Bicycle travel Gondola travel
Route Markers	Detour Roadblock Fast Forward Speed Bump Intersection Pit Stop

=== Leg 1 (India) ===
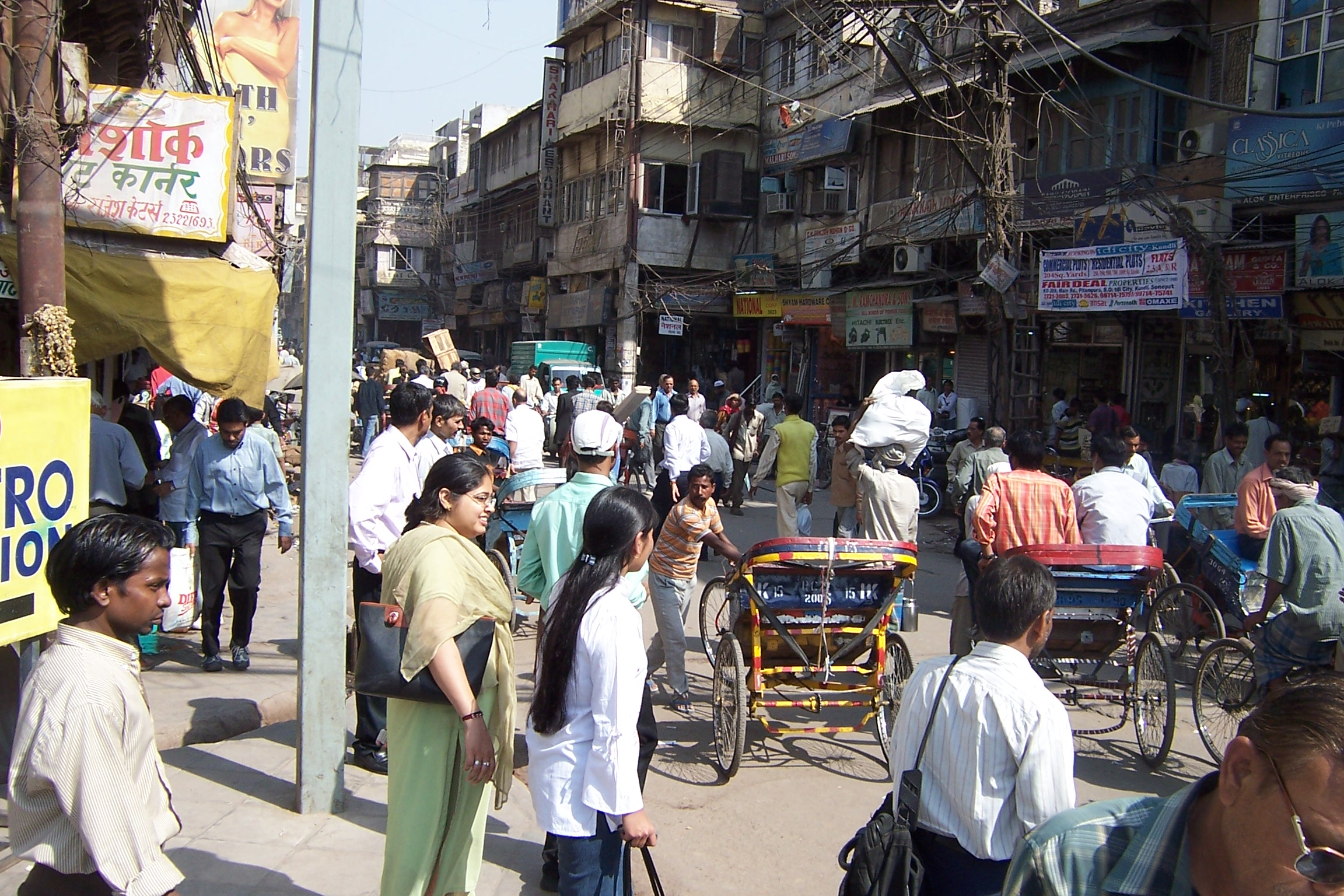
The first Detour of The Amazing Race Australia: Celebrity Edition visited Chandni Chowk in Delhi.

- Episode 1 (4 October 2023)
- Prize: A stay at a hotel suite during the Pit Stop (awarded to Darren & Tristan)
- Eliminated: Dane & Bow

Locations

- Delhi, India (Sunder Nursery) (Starting Line)
- Delhi (Chandni Chowk – Royal Palace Hotel)
- Delhi (Chandni Chowk – Aslam Chicken or Kinari Bazar)
- Delhi (PVR Priya Vasant) (Unaired)
- Delhi (Defence Colony Club)
- Delhi (Qutub Minar)

Episode summary

- Teams set off from Sunder Nursery in Delhi and had to travel by auto rickshaw to the Royal Palace Hotel in order to find their next clue.
- This season's first Detour was a choice between Chicken Dish or Wedding Wish. In Chicken Dish, teams had to purchase five ingredients for a butter chicken sauce and deliver them to Aslam Chicken in order to receive their next clue. In Wedding Wish, teams had to memorise the outfits for a Hindu wedding on two mannequins and purchase the clothing items. Teams then had to don the outfits and have a photograph taken before receiving their next clue.
- Teams had to travel to the Defence Colony Club and learn a Hindi phrase from children in a pool – "Please help me. I need to get to Qutub Minar." – before receiving their next clue instructing them to use the phrase in order to get there and find the Pit Stop.

Additional note

- In an unaired Roadblock, one team member had to prepare 26 paan betel leaves filled with different ingredients and then consume one set on fire before receiving their next clue.

=== Leg 2 (India) ===
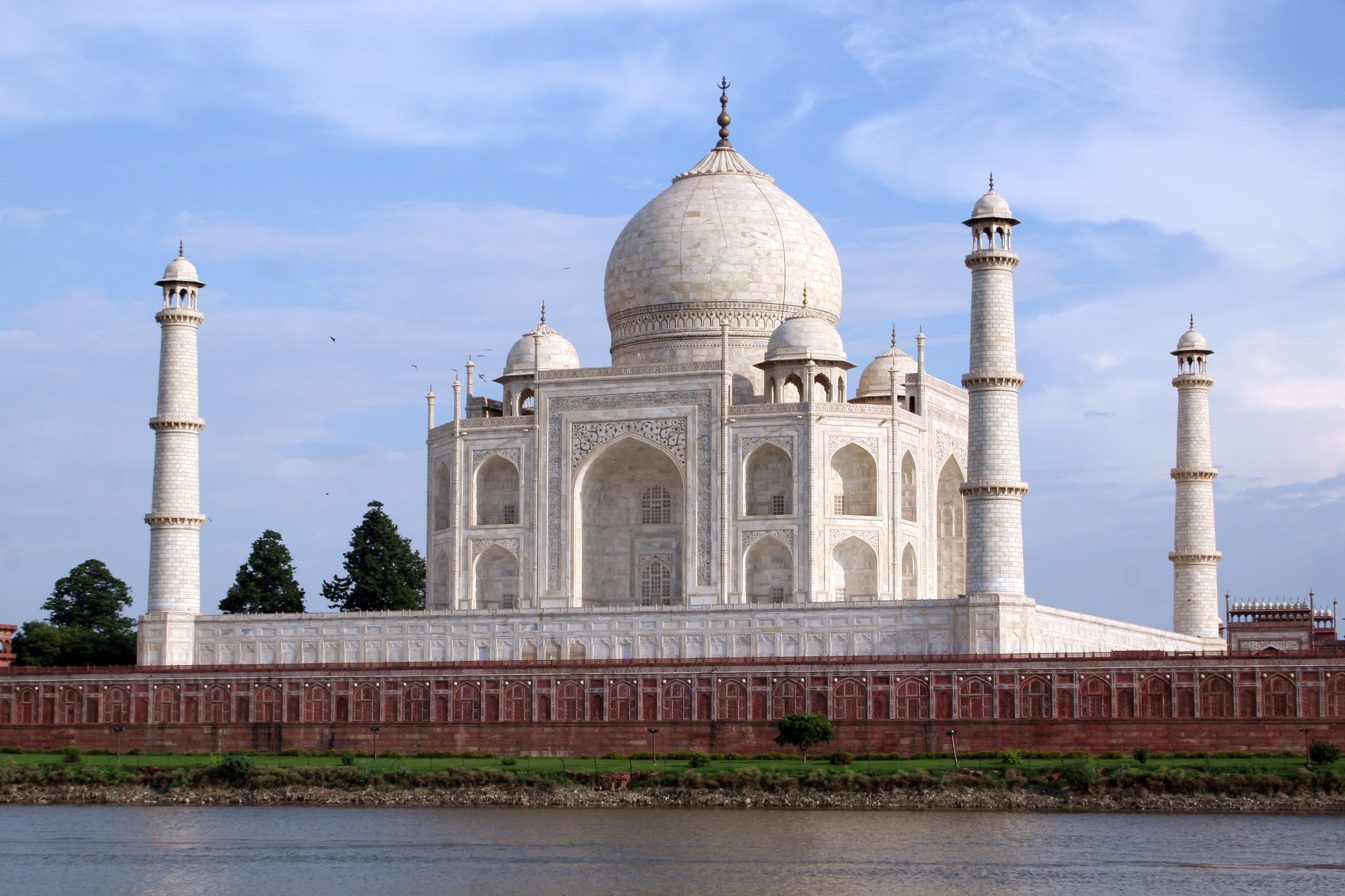
The second leg in India concluded at Mehtab Bagh across from the Taj Mahal in Agra.

- Episode 2 (5 October 2023)
- Eliminated: Grant & Chezzi

Locations

- Delhi → Agra (Inter State Bus Terminal)
- Agra (Ruchi Chaiwalla Tea Stall)
- Agra (Blue Flower School or Yamuna River – Hathi Ghat)
- Agra (Dr. Bhimrao Ambedkar University)
- Agra (Mehtab Bagh)

Episode summary

- During the Pit Stop, teams travelled by bus to Agra. Once there, teams had to search the bus station for their next clue, which instructed them to travel by auto rickshaw to Ruchi Chaiwalla Tea Stall, deliver a Masala chai order to a business, receive a business card and exchange the card for their next clue.
- This leg's Detour was a choice between Make It Stick or Make It Slick. In Make It Stick, teams had to make 64 fuel bricks out of cow dung and hay and then stick them to a wall in order to receive their next clue. In Make It Slick, teams had to wash a bundle of dirty laundry, slap out the suds on the banks of the Yamuna River and hang it out to dry in order to receive their next clue.
- After the Detour, teams travelled to Dr. Bhimrao Ambedkar University and encountered an Intersection, which required two teams to mutually join together to complete the following task. The teams were paired up thusly: Jana & Cor and Harry & Teddy, Alli & Angie and Emma & Hayley, Darren & Tristan and Ben & Jackie, Grant & Chezzi and Peter & Frankie, and George & Pam and Bec & Kate. After pairing up, teams had to perform a Bollywood dance in order to receive their next clue. After this task, teams were no longer joined.
- Teams had to check in at the Pit Stop: Mehtab Bagh, overlooking the Taj Mahal.

Additional note

- Grant lost consciousness after the Intersection task. After Grant regained consciousness, Beau met him and Chezzi out on the racecourse to inform them of their elimination.

=== Leg 3 (India) ===
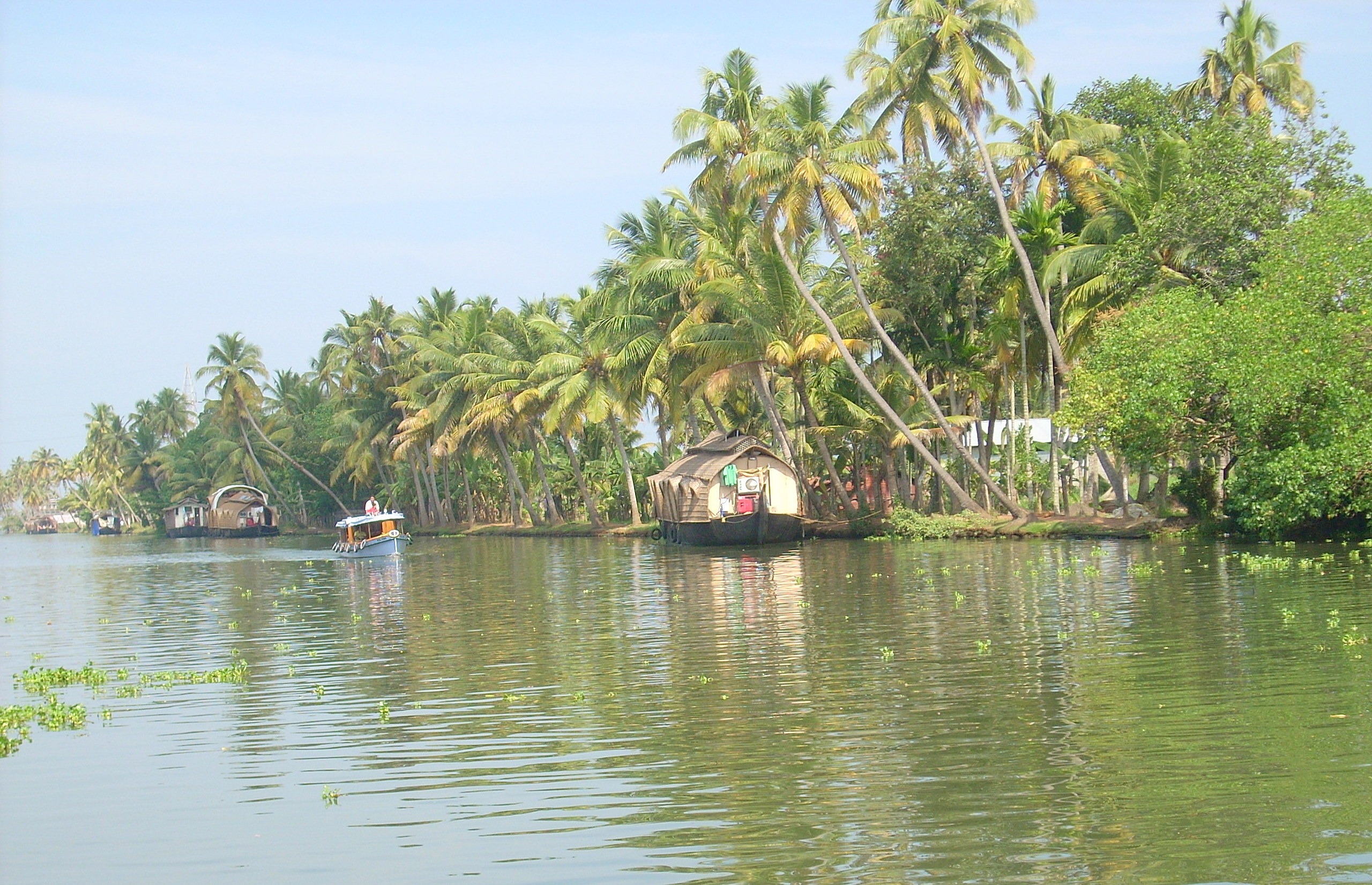
Teams travelled through the waterways of Kerala during the third leg.

- Episode 3 (11 October 2023)
- Prize: A stay at a hotel suite during the Pit Stop (awarded to Darren & Tristan)

Locations

- Agra → Delhi
- Delhi → Kochi
- Kochi (West Coast Canal)
- Kochi (Marine Drive – Musical Walkway Bridge)
- Kochi (Ernakulam Thirumala Devaswom or Maharaja's College Stadium)
- Kochi (Parakkat Jewels)
- Kochi (Raja Driving School)
- Kainakary (Gopi Sundar House)
- Kainakary South (Meenappally Kayal – Kettuvallam)

Episode summary

- During the Pit Stop, teams travelled by bus and plane to Kochi. Once there, teams had to travel by taxi to the Musical Walkway Bridge in order to find their next clue.
- This leg's Detour was a choice between Stripe It or Strike It. In Stripe It, teams had to paint a tiger face on a Puli Kali dancer's belly in order to receive their next clue. In Strike It, teams had to play gillidanda, a game similar to cricket, and score 100 points in order to receive their next clue.
- For this season's only Fast Forward, one team had to travel to Parakkat Jewels, where both team members had to get a nose piercing. Darren & Tristan won the Fast Forward.
- In this season's first aired Roadblock, one team member had drive a manual transmission auto rickshaw through a Regional Transport Office driving school course without hitting any obstacles in order to receive their next clue.
- After the Roadblock, teams had to travel by taxi and shikara boat to the Gopi Sundar House. There, teams had to eat through 30 Changalikodan (a local variety of banana) until they found a blue one in order to receive their next clue directing them to the Pit Stop: a houseboat on Meenappally Kayal.

Additional note

- This was a non-elimination leg.

=== Leg 4 (India → Malaysia) ===
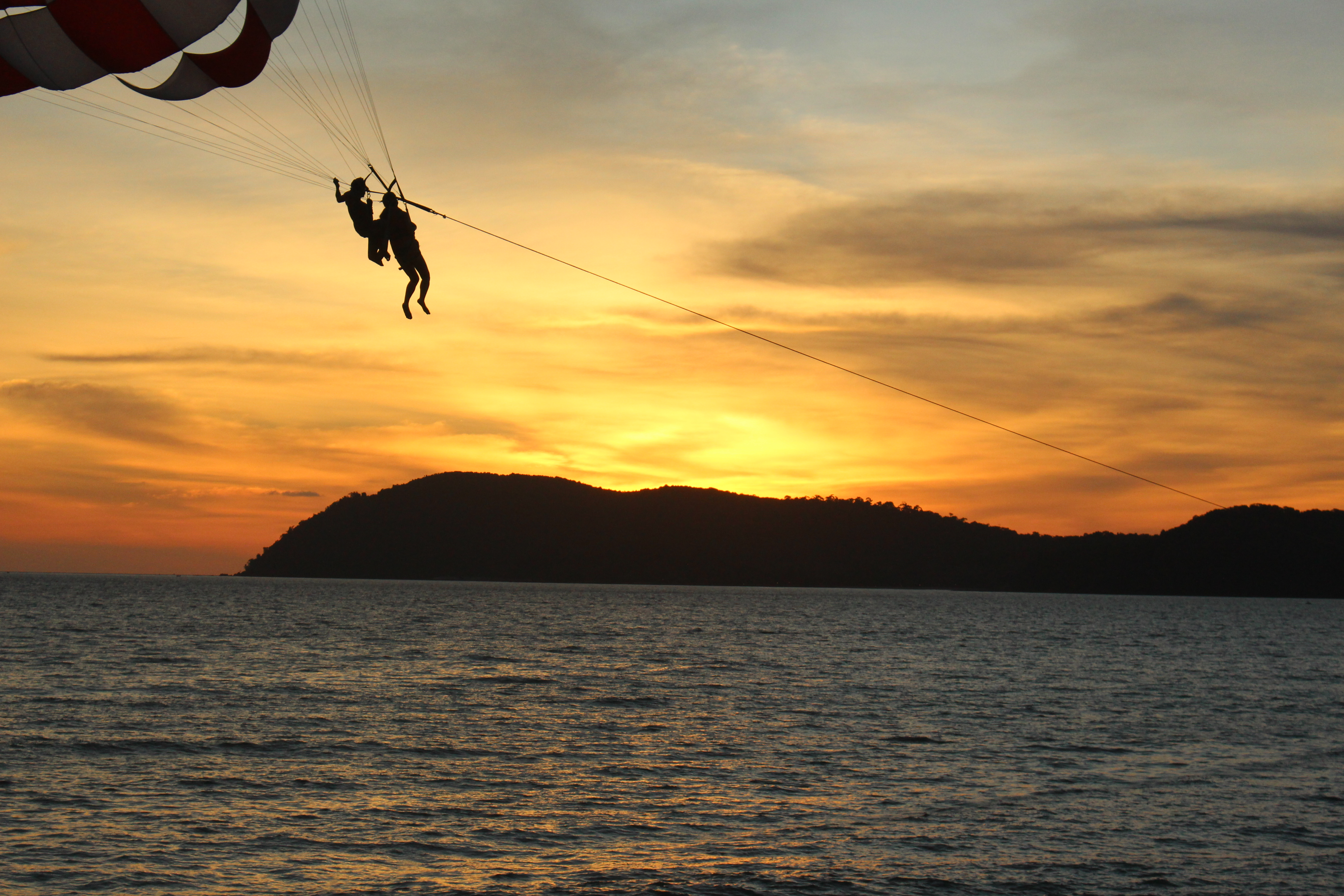
One Detour option in Langkawi had teams parasailing.

- Episode 4 (12 October 2023)
- Eliminated: Peter & Frankie

Locations

- Kochi → Langkawi, Malaysia (Langkawi International Airport)
- Langkawi (Telaga Harbour)
- Langkawi (Datai Bay or Pulau Rebak Besar)
- Langkawi (Gua Pinang)
- Langkawi (Fruit Farm)
- Langkawi (Tanjung Rhu Beach)

Episode summary

- During the Pit Stop, teams flew to Langkawi, Malaysia. Teams departed from the airport in the order that they finished the previous leg and had to drive to Telaga Harbour in order to find their next clue.
- For their Speed Bump, George & Pam had to clean up a section of beach and fill two Hessian sacks with trash before they could continue racing.
- This leg's Detour was a choice between Eagle Eye or Mai Tai. In Eagle Eye, teams had to drive a personal watercraft to Datai Bay, parasail above the bay and spot a piece of eagle artwork. Teams then had to choose a trinket at a floating shop that matched the artwork in order to receive their next clue. In Mai Tai, teams had to drive a personal watercraft to Pulau Rebak Besar and use a standup paddleboard to deliver a tray of two cocktails to a pair of holiday-makers on a boat in order to receive their next clue.
- After the Detour, team had to travel by boat to Gua Pinang and search inside the cave for their next clue.
- In this leg's Roadblock, one team member had to replicate a fruit basket in order to receive their next clue directing them to the Pit Stop: Tanjung Rhu Beach.

Additional note

- Although the last team to arrive at the Pit Stop was eliminated, there was no rest period at the end of the leg and all remaining teams were instead instructed to continue racing.

=== Leg 5 (Malaysia) ===
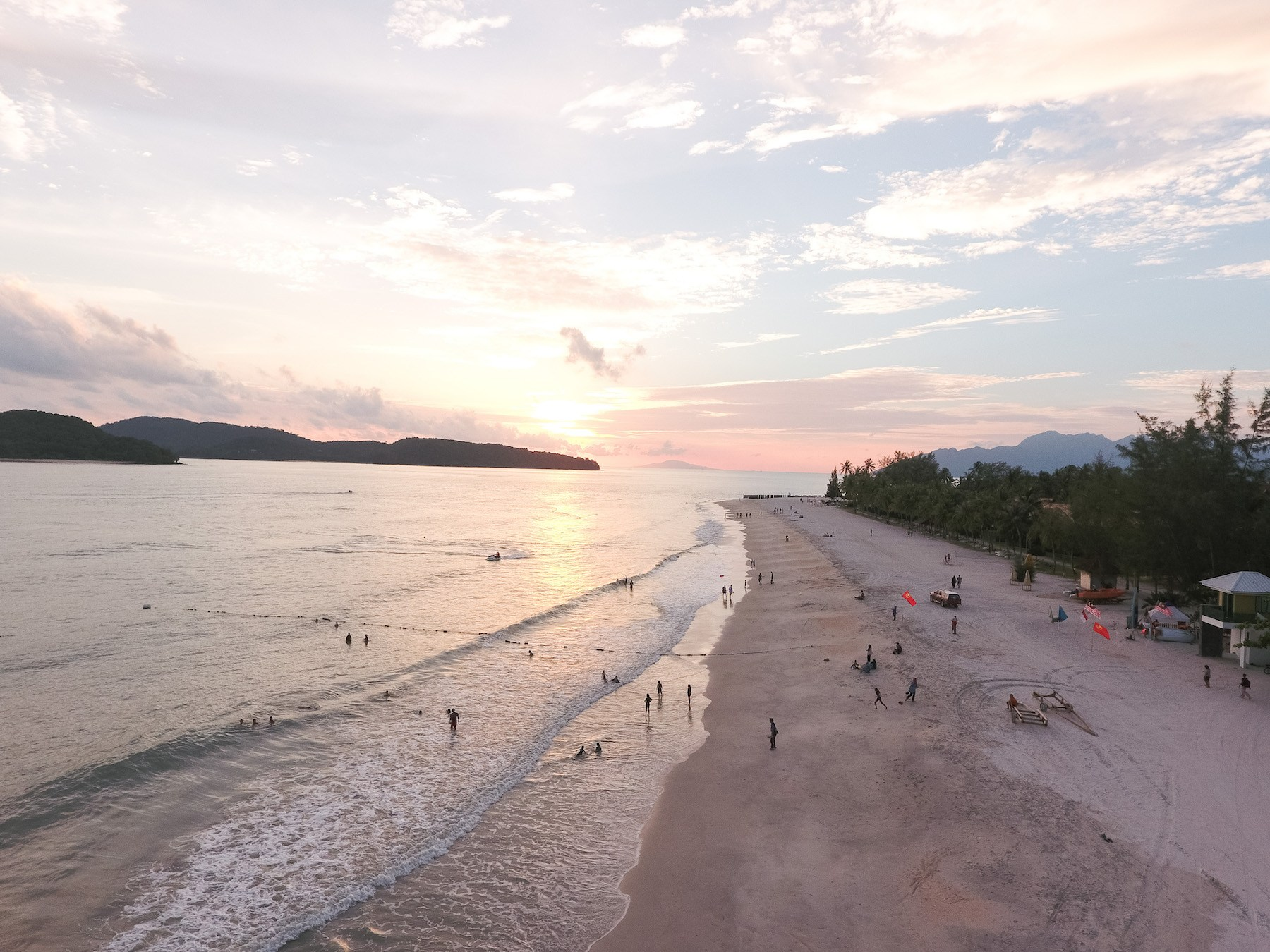
Before flying to Penang, teams camped out on Cenang Beach.

- Episode 5 (18 October 2023)
- Prize: A stay at a hotel suite during the Pit Stop (awarded to Alli & Angie)
- Eliminated: Ben & Jackie

Locations

- Langkawi (Crab Farm Langkawi)
- Langkawi (Cenang Beach)
- Langkawi → George Town, Penang (Penang International Airport)
- George Town (The Dutchie Penang or Hin Bus Depot)
- George Town (Carnarvon Street)
- George Town (Pinang Peranakan Mansion – Chung Keng Quee Temple)

Episode summary

- At the start of this leg, teams had to drive to Crab Farm Langkawi and catch five fully-grown mud crabs in order to receive their next clue. Teams then had to drive to Cenang Beach and sell the five crabs that they caught until they earned RM100 (approximately A$32), which they had to exchange for their next clue. Teams were then instructed to fly to George Town, Penang; however, they had to spend the night on the beach in a tent before flying out the next day. Teams departed from the airport in the order that they arrived at the campsite before finding their next clue.
- This leg's Detour was a choice between Piles of Tiles or Burn Your Boat. In Piles of Tiles, teams had to sort through a pile of mahjong tiles and prepare a complete game with 144 tiles in order to receive their next clue. In Burn Your Boat, teams had to fold joss paper in order to form five paper boats. Teams then had to burn the boats in order to receive their next clue.
- After the Detour, teams had to purchase five bachang on Carnarvon Street and deliver them to Beau at the Pit Stop: the Chung Keng Quee Temple on the grounds of the Pinang Peranakan Mansion.

=== Leg 6 (Malaysia) ===
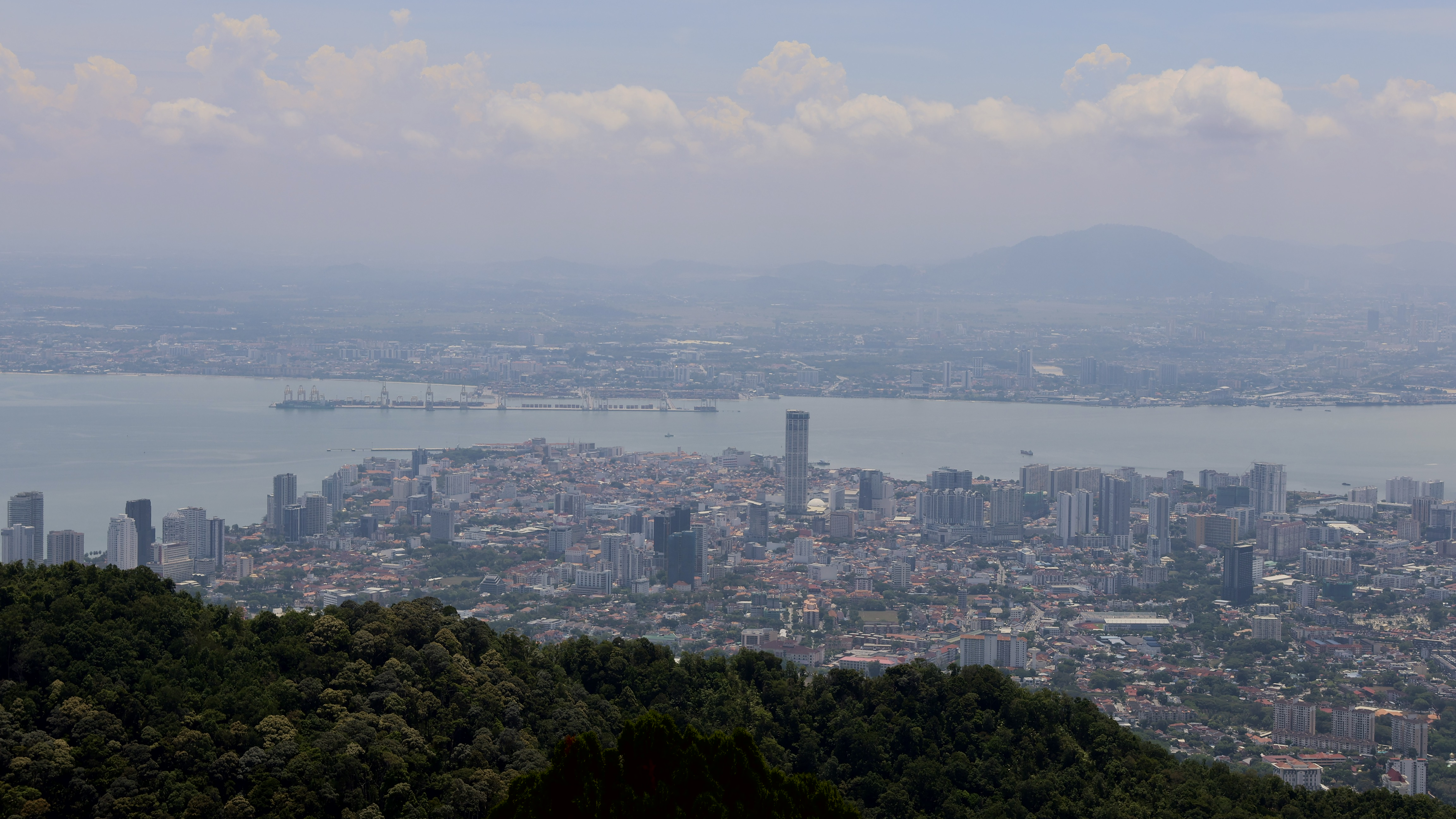
Atop Penang Hill overlooking the city of George Town, teams found the sixth Pit Stop.

- Episode 6 (19 October 2023)
- Prize: A stay at a hotel suite during the Pit Stop (awarded to Jana & Cor)
- Eliminated: George & Pam

Locations

- George Town (St. Giles Wembley)
- George Town (Central Fire Station)
- George Town (Moh Teng Pheow Nyonya Koay or Sup Hameed)
- George Town (Hong Kong Shoe Store & Kimberley Boutique Hotel)
- George Town (Hean Boo Thean Kuan Yin)
- George Town (Penang Hill – Curtis Crest Treetop Walk)

Episode summary

- At the start of this leg, teams had to travel by trishaw to the Central Fire Station in order to find their next clue.
- This leg's Detour was a choice between Treats or Eats. In Treats, teams had to replicate a kuih dessert platter in order to receive their next clue. In Eats, teams had to eat a bowl of sup torpedo, a soup with bull tongue and bull penis, in order to receive their next clue.
- In this leg's Roadblock, one team member had to construct a pair of shoes at the store where Jimmy Choo apprenticed in order to receive their next clue.
- After the Roadblock, teams had to travel by trishaw to Hean Boo Thean Kuan Yin, search through thousands of lanterns for one with an English word and whisper the word to the temple keeper in order to receive their next clue, which directed them to the Pit Stop: the Curtis Crest Treetop Walk on Penang Hill.

=== Leg 7 (Malaysia → Cambodia) ===
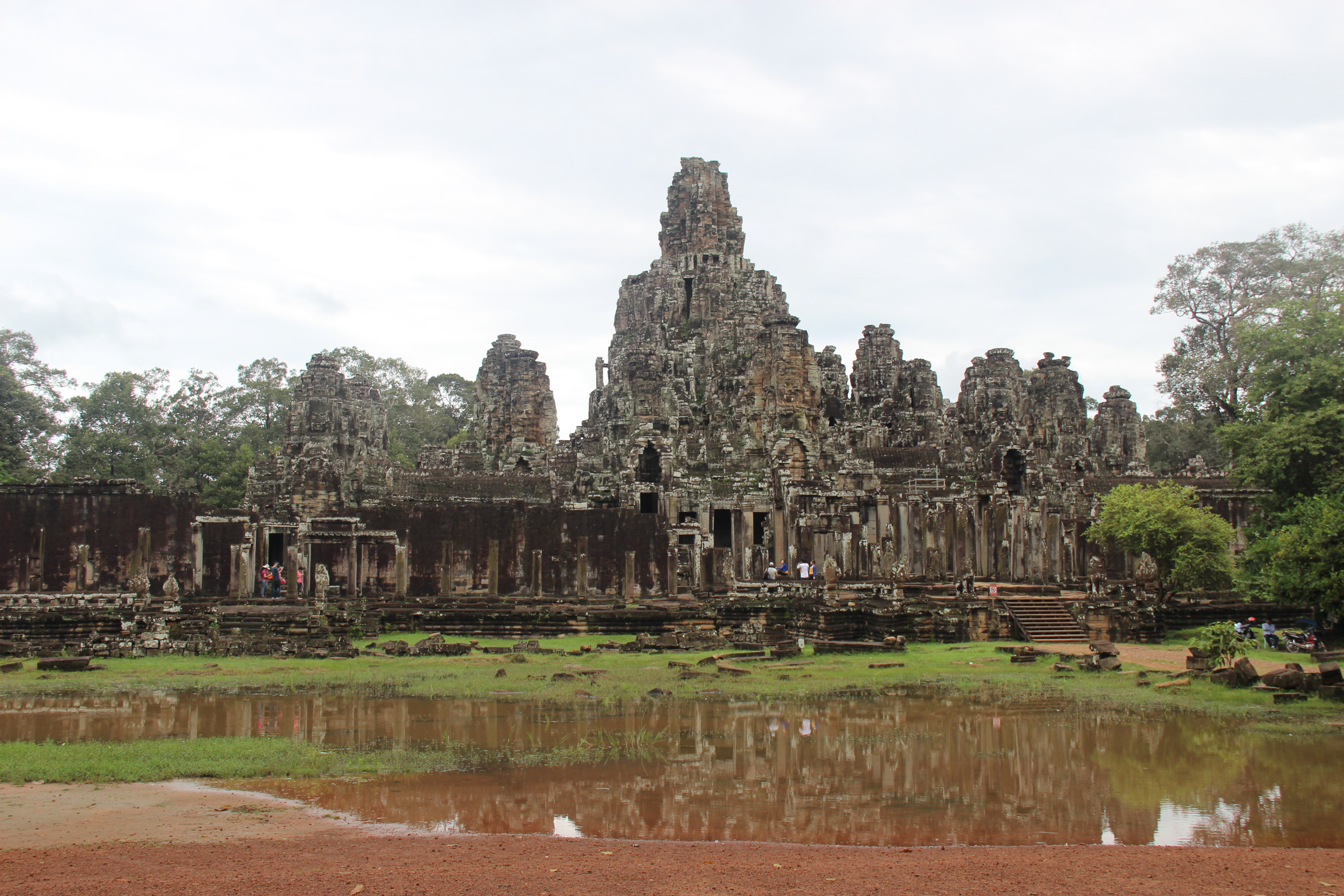
Teams had to learn bokator at Bayon Temple during the Detour.

- Episode 7 (25 October 2023)
- Eliminated: Bec & Kate

Locations

- George Town → Siem Reap, Cambodia (Siem Reap International Airport)
- Siem Reap (Chum Theany Angkor Souvenir Shop)
- Siem Reap (Angkor Wat)
- Siem Reap (Preah Ang Kmao Pagoda or Bayon Temple)
- Siem Reap (Old Market) (Unaired)
- Siem Reap (Asana Old Wooden House)
- Siem Reap (Wat Damnak)

Episode summary

- During the Pit Stop, teams flew to Siem Reap, Cambodia. Teams departed from the airport in the order that they finished the previous leg and had to travel to the Chum Theany Angkor Souvenir Shop in order to find their next clue. Teams then had to travel to Angkor Wat, collect an offering and give it to the one monk who had their next clue.
- This leg's Detour was a choice between Protect Your House or Protect Your Empire. In Protect Your House, teams had to memorise a spirit house, travel to another pagoda and recreate the spirit house in order to receive their next clue. In Protect Your Empire, teams had to perform a sequence of four bokator moves in order to receive their next clue.
- After the Detour, teams had to travel to the Asana Old Wooden House in order to receive their next clue.
- In this leg's Roadblock, one team member had to fry three tarantulas and then eat an assortment of fried spiders and insects in order to receive their next clue, which instructed them to travel on foot to the Pit Stop: Wat Damnak.

Additional note

- In an unaired segment, teams had to travel to the Old Market, purchase local produce and deliver them to the Asana Old Wooden House.
- Bec & Kate did not attempt the Roadblock as Bec suffered from arachnophobia.

=== Leg 8 (Cambodia) ===
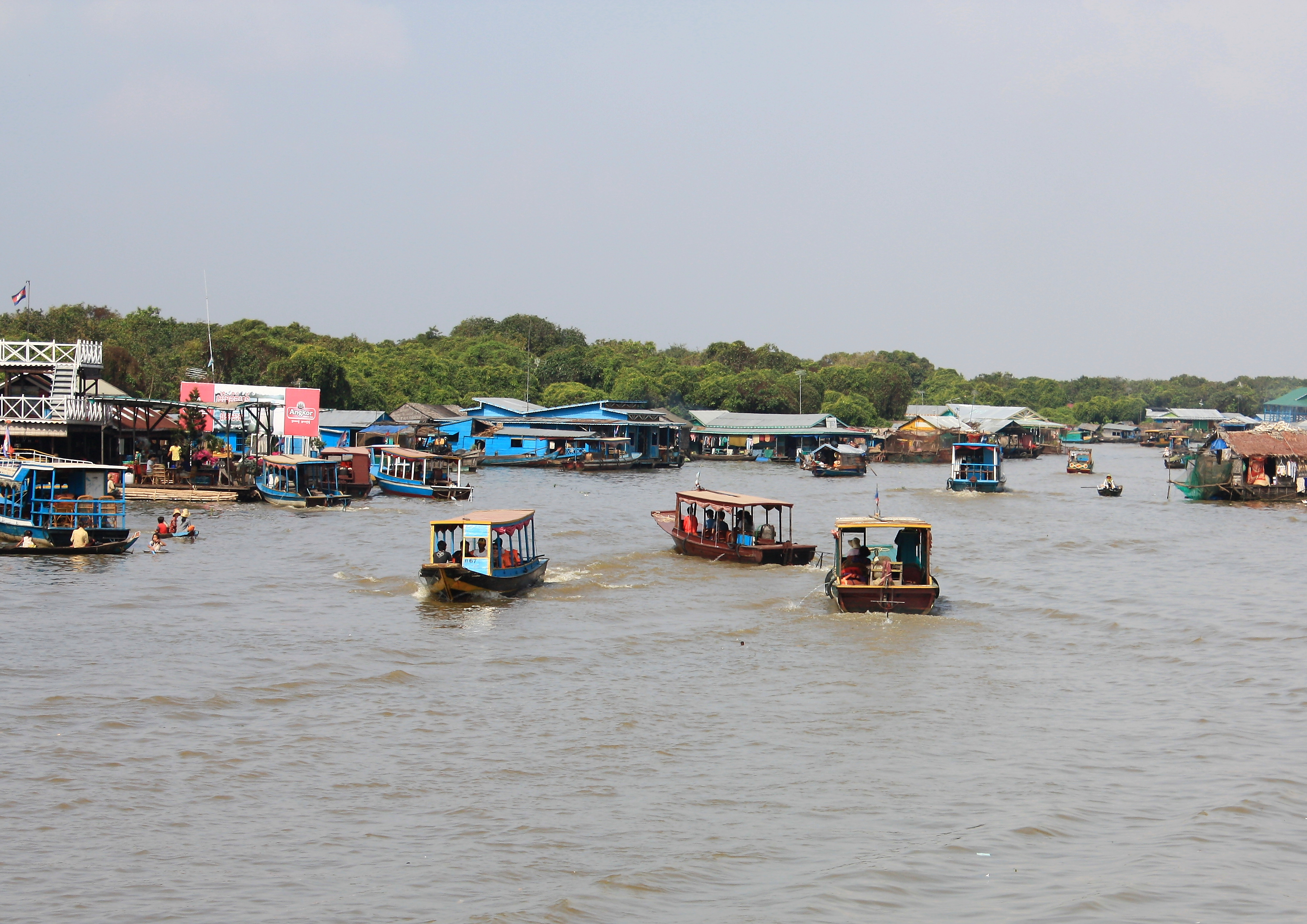
The eighth leg was set in the waters of Tonlé Sap.

- Episode 8 (26 October 2023)
- Prize: A stay at a hotel suite during the Pit Stop (awarded to Emma & Hayley)

Locations

- Siem Reap (Angkor Century Resort and Spa)
- Siem Reap (Ponloeu Angkor Bookstore)
- Tonlé Sap (Chong Khneas – Floating Primary School)
- Tonlé Sap (Fishing Port or Floating Garden)
- Siem Reap (Rice Farm)

Episode summary

- At the start of this leg, teams had to purchase school supplies at the Ponloeu Angkor Bookstore and then deliver them to the floating primary school on Tonlé Sap in order to receive their next clue. Teams then had to sing "Old MacDonald Had a Farm" in Khmer in order to receive their next clue.
- This leg's Detour was a choice between Fish or Farm. In Fish, teams had to row a boat along a series of fishing traps and collect enough shrimp in order to fill a cup and receive their next clue. In Farm, teams had to plant a garden bed and label the plants in order to receive their next clue.
- In this leg's Roadblock, one team member had to use a large stick to separate Jasmine rice from its rice hulls and then sift enough rice until they could fill a cup in order to receive their next clue, which directed them to the nearby Pit Stop.

Additional note

- This was a non-elimination leg.

=== Leg 9 (Cambodia) ===
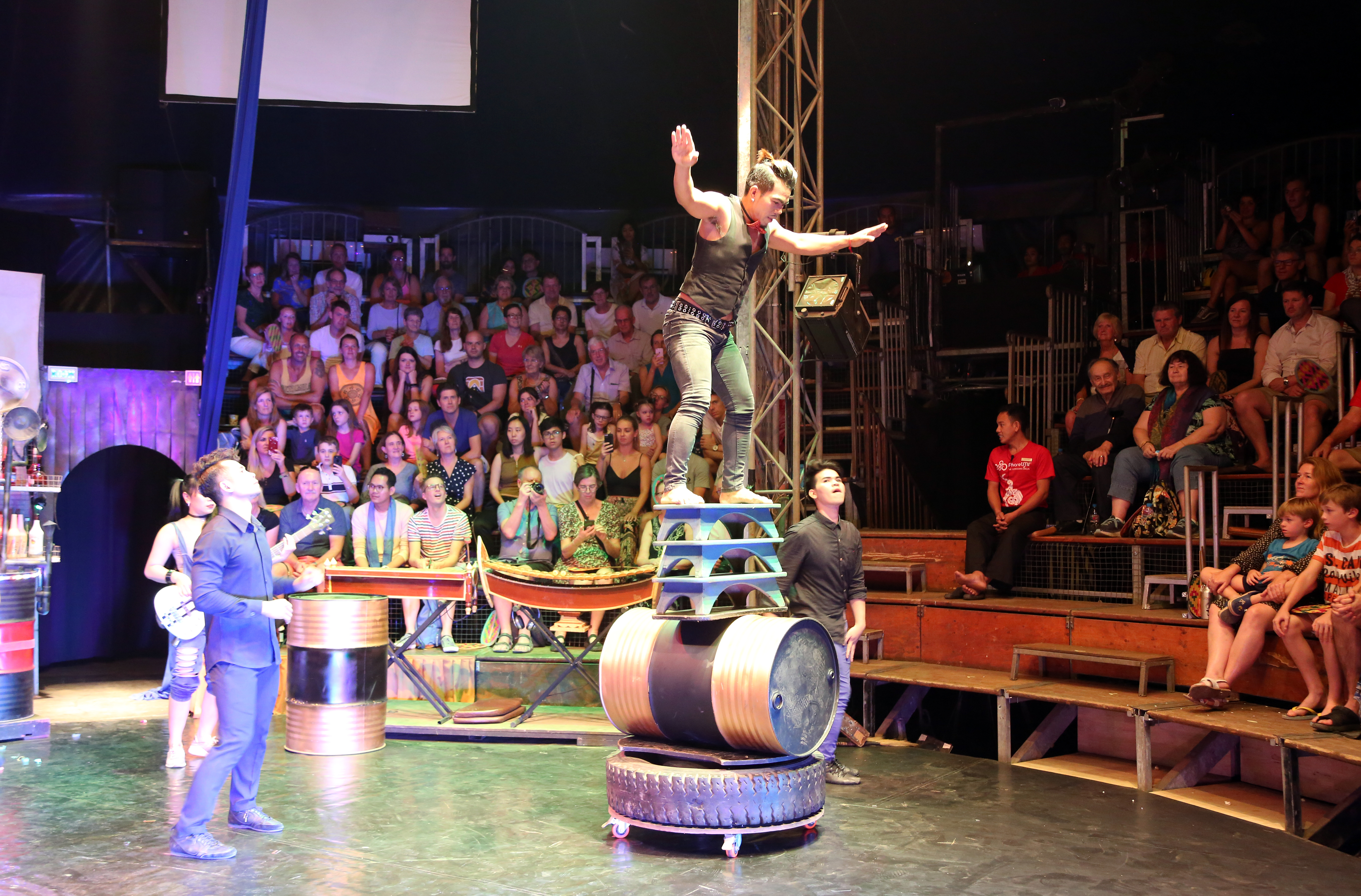
The Detour in Siem Reap had teams perform at Phare Circus.

- Episode 9 (1 November 2023)
- Prize: A stay at a hotel suite during the Pit Stop (awarded to Emma & Hayley)
- Eliminated: Jana & Cor

Locations

- Siem Reap (Sivutha Boulevard)
- Siem Reap (Royal Independence Gardens)
- Siem Reap (Phare Circus)
- Siem Reap (Cambodian People's Party Building)
- Siem Reap (Phalla Furniture Shop)
- Siem Reap (Lotus Silk Farm)
- Siem Reap (Chamkar House)

Episode summary

- At the start of this leg, teams had to travel on foot to the Royal Independence Gardens in order to find their next clue.
- This leg's Detour was a choice between Stop the Wobbles or Start the Giggles. In Stop the Wobbles, both team member had to stand on an acrobat cylinder for one minute in order to receive their next clue. In Start the Giggles, teams had to perform a slapstick comedy routine in order to receive their next clue.
- After the Detour, teams had to load a bicycle with 40 brooms, and then one team member had to pedal the broom-laden bicycle to Phalla Furniture Shop in order to receive their next clue.
- For their Speed Bump, Harry & Teddy had to each deliver 40 more brooms by hand to the furniture shop before they could continue racing.
- After the broom delivery, teams had to travel to Chong Srok Lotus Pond, where they had to harvest 50 lotus flowers and then craft a six-metre (20 ft) thread of lotus silk at the Lotus Silk Farm in order to receive their next clue, which instructed them to travel on foot to the Pit Stop: Chamkar House.

Additional notes

- In an unaired Roadblock, one team member had to make a broom using dried palm leaf sheets in order to receive their next clue.
- This leg was The Amazing Race Australia's 100th overall leg.

=== Leg 10 (Cambodia → Malaysia) ===
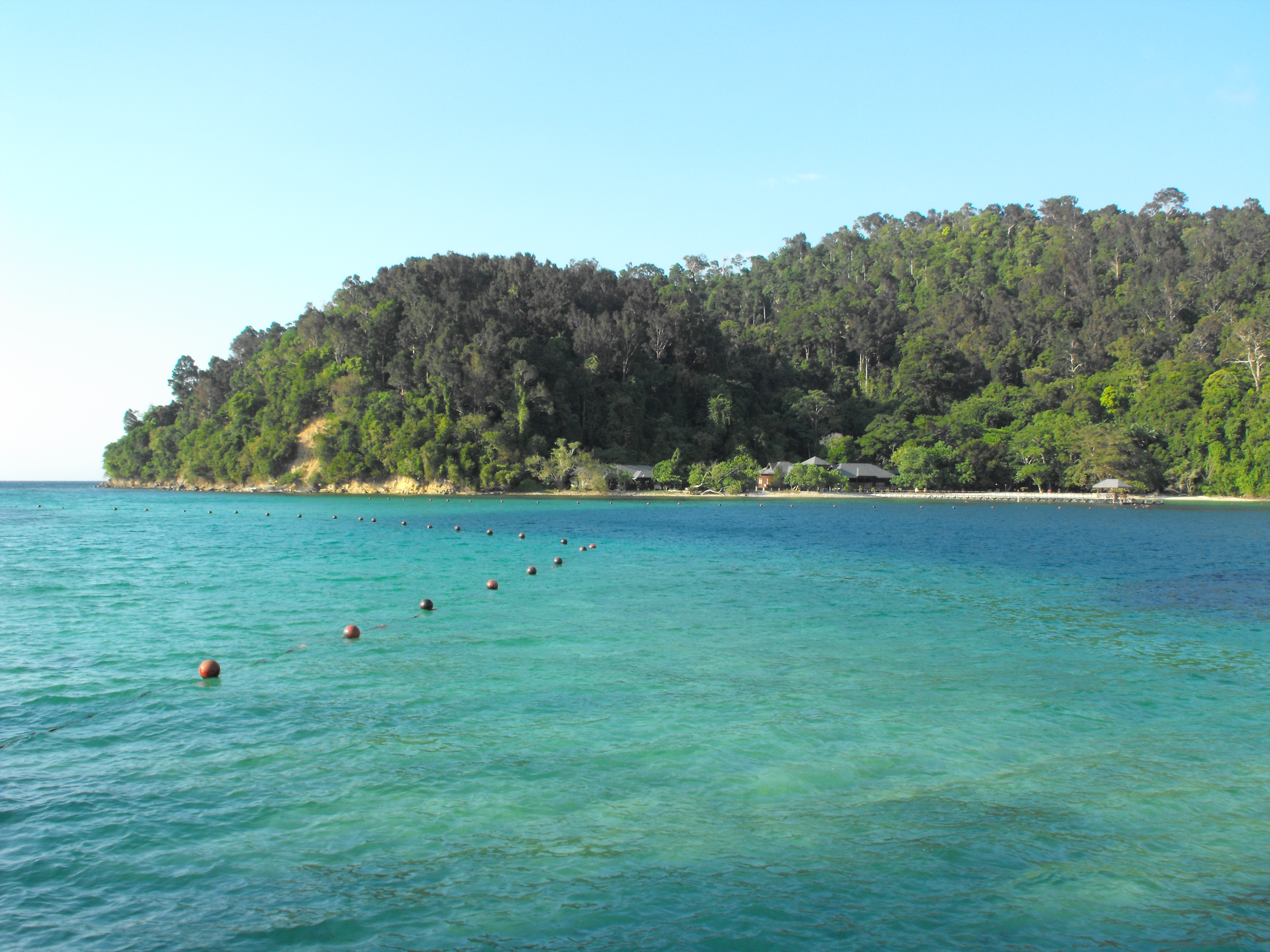
Teams visited Gaya Island during their first leg in Borneo.

- Episode 10 (2 November 2023)

Locations

- Siem Reap → Kota Kinabalu, Malaysia (Kota Kinabalu International Airport)
- Kota Kinabalu (Kota Kinabalu Fish Market)
- Tunku Abdul Rahman National Park (Gaya Island Resort Marine Centre)
- Tunku Abdul Rahman National Park (Padang Point)
- Tunku Abdul Rahman National Park (Sapi Island)

Episode summary

- During the Pit Stop, teams flew to Kota Kinabalu, Malaysia. Teams departed from the airport in the order that they finished the previous leg and were directed to travel to the Kota Kinabalu Fish Market. There, teams had to clean and gut six fish in order to receive their next clue. Teams then had to travel by Bajau boat to the Gaya Island Resort Marine Centre for their next clue.
- This season's final Detour was a choice between Save the Mangroves or Save the Reef. In Save the Mangroves, teams had to kayak into a mangrove forest, collect 36 mangrove seeds and then plant them in a nursery in order to receive their next clue. In Save the Reef, teams had to collect dead coral, glue on living coral nubbins and then place the coral on the ocean floor in order to receive their next clue.
- In this leg's Roadblock, one team member had to memorise nine masks on a jungle trek and then place images of the masks in the correct order on a board in order to receive their next clue.
- After the Roadblock, teams had to get a coconut from the shallows and then deliver it by kayak to Beau at the Pit Stop: Sapi Island.

Additional note

- This was a non-elimination leg.

=== Leg 11 (Malaysia) ===
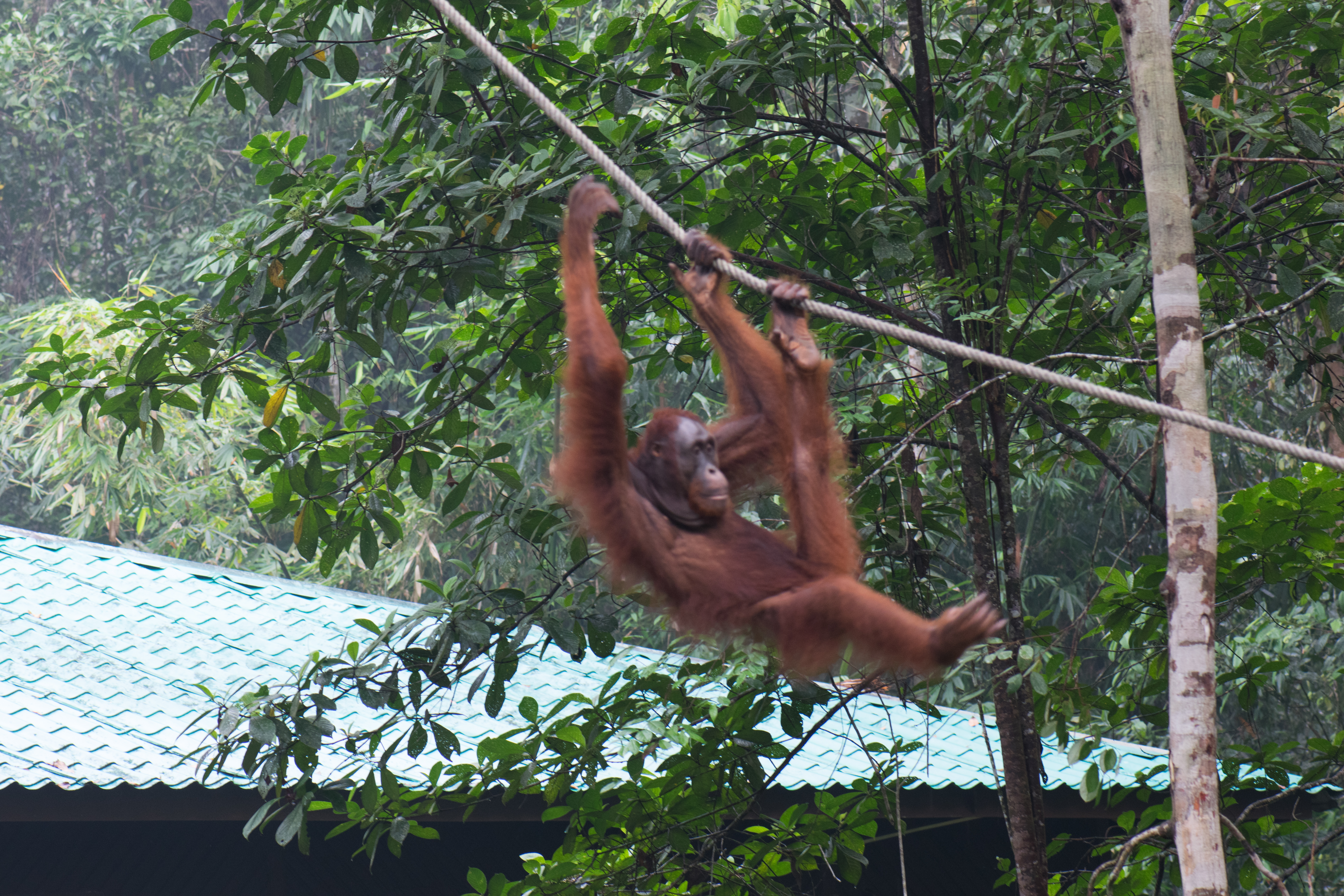
The Intersection in Sarawak had teams feed orangutans.

- Episode 11 (8 November 2023)
- Eliminated: Harry & Teddy

Locations

- Kota Kinabalu → Kuching (Kuching International Airport)
- Kuching (Petanak Central Market)
- Siburan (Semenggoh Wildlife Centre)
- Siburan (Kampung Danu)
- Siburan (Sarawak Kanan River)

Episode summary

- During the Pit Stop, teams flew to Kuching. Teams departed from the airport in the order that they finished the previous leg. Teams had to drive to a fruit market, purchase a list of fruit and then deliver the fruit to the Semenggoh Wildlife Centre in order to find their next clue.
- Teams encountered a second Intersection and were paired up thusly: Darren & Tristan and Alli & Angie; and Harry & Teddy and Emma & Hayley. After pairing up, one team had to prepare the fruit for the orangutans, while the other team called them down. Teams also had to memorise information about the orangutans said by the guides. After the orangutans were fed, teams received their next clue. Teams then had to arrange a board with the years of birth, favourite fruits and fun facts about the orangutans in order to receive their next clue. After this task, teams were no longer joined.
- For their Speed Bump, Alli & Angie had to create a climbing rope for the orangutans. They had to use a slingshot to launch a line over a branch, secure a thicker rope and pull the rope over the branch before they could continue racing.
- After the Intersection, teams had to drive to Kampung Danu, build a bamboo raft and then travel six kilometres (3.7 mi) down the river in order to find their next clue.
- In this season's final Roadblock, one team member had to use blowgun and hit three pieces of fruit with darts in order to receive their next clue, which directed them to the nearby Pit Stop.

=== Leg 12 (Malaysia) ===
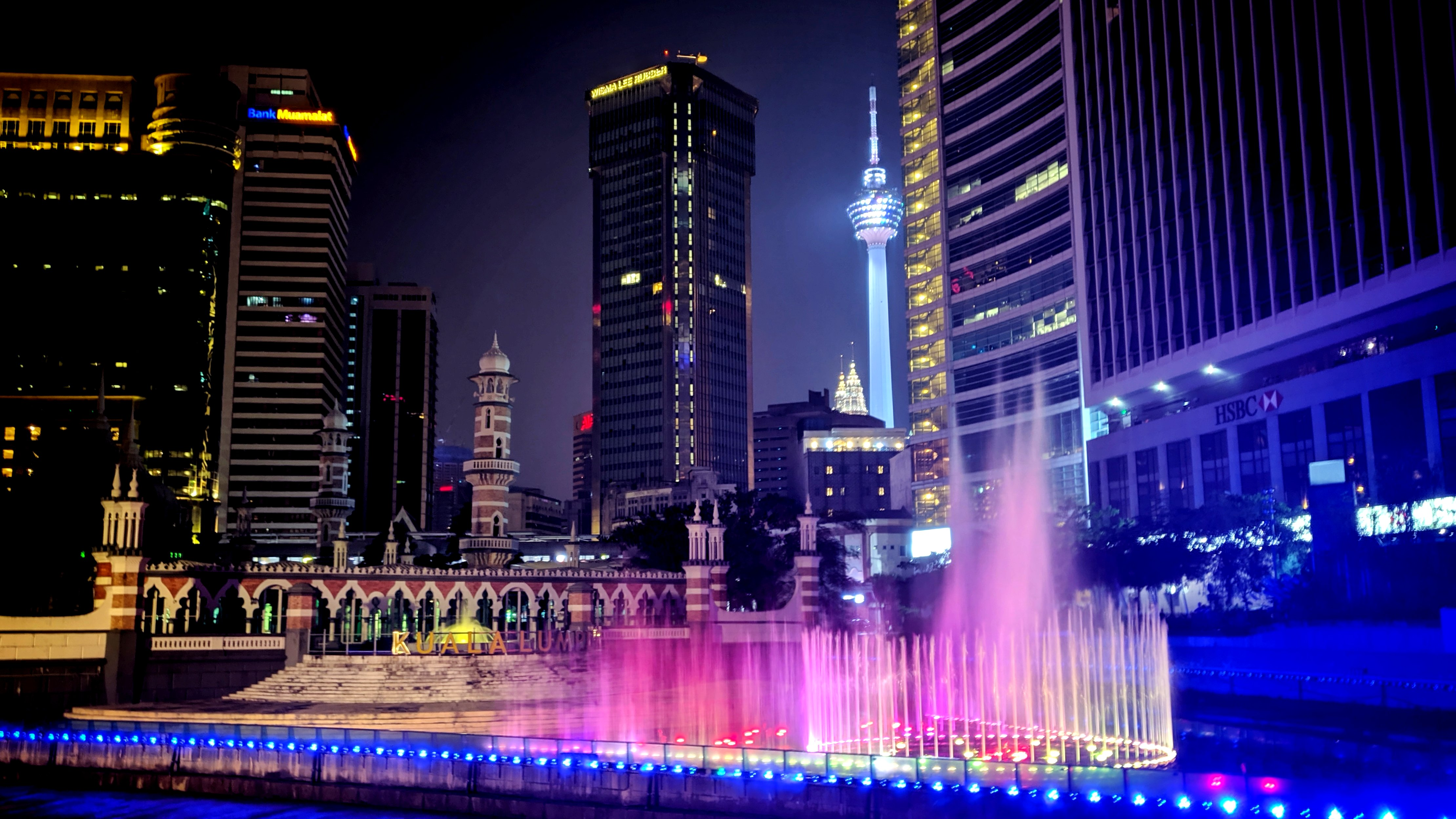
Teams finished the final leg of The Amazing Race Australia: Celebrity Edition at The River of Life by Masjid Jamek in Kuala Lumpur.

- Episode 12 (9 November 2023)
- Prizes: A$100,000 for the team's chosen charity (prize split among Alli & Angie, Darren & Tristan and Emma & Haley)
- Winners: Darren & Tristan, Emma & Haley and Alli & Angie

Locations

- Kuching → Kuala Lumpur
- Kuala Lumpur (Saloma Link)
- Subang Jaya (Fangs by DEKÕRI Premium Café)
- Kuala Lumpur (BookXcess RexKL (in Malay))
- Kuala Lumpur (Masjid Jamek Pedestrian Bridge)
- Kuala Lumpur (Menara TA One)
- Kuala Lumpur (The River of Life Lookout)

Episode summary

- During the Pit Stop, teams flew to Kuala Lumpur and began the final leg simultaneously at the Saloma Link. Teams had to travel by taxi to Fangs by DEKÕRI Premium Café. With a Burmese python on their neck, one team member had to recreate a dessert described to them by their partner in order to receive their next clue.
- Teams were instructed to travel by taxi to BookXcess RexKL, find a treasure map in the travel section and then align the map to a matching bookcase in order to find their next clue inside a copy of Around the World in Eighty Days. Teams then had to travel to the Masjid Jamek pedestrian bridge and perform a hip hop routine with the Nasty Boys in order to receive their next clue, which directed them to Menara TA One. There, teams had to arrange ten discs with images from previous legs in chronological order in order to receive their final clue, which instructed them to travel by train to the finish line: The River of Life Lookout.

Leg	Image
1	Chandni Chowk
2	Taj Mahal
3	West Coast Canal
4	Gua Pinang
5	Chung Keng Quee Temple
6	Kimberley Boutique Hotel
7	Angkor Wat
8	Rice field
9	Chamkar House
10	Kota Kinabalu boat jetty

Additional notes

- Miss Universe Malaysia 2022 Lesley Cheam Wei Yeng appeared as the finish line greeter for this leg.
- Darren & Tristan were the first to arrive but waited for the next two teams. The final three teams then chose to step onto the finish line mat simultaneously and equally split the prize, which went to the teams' selected charities.

== Reception ==
=== Ratings ===
Rating data is from OzTAM and represents the viewership from the 5 largest Australian metropolitan centres (Sydney, Melbourne, Brisbane, Perth and Adelaide).

Week	Episode	Air date	Timeslot	Overnight ratings		Consolidated ratings	Total ratings		Source
Week	Episode	Air date	Timeslot	Viewers	Rank	Viewers	Viewers	Rank	Source
1	1	4 October 2023	Wednesday 7:30 pm	486,000	8	104,000	909,000	7	
1	2	5 October 2023	Thursday 7:30 pm	429,000	10	112,000	857,000	8	
2	3	11 October 2023	Wednesday 7:30 pm	332,000	14	112,000	692,000	13	
2	4	12 October 2023	Thursday 7:30 pm	347,000	12	117,000	734,000	10	
3	5	18 October 2023	Wednesday 7:30 pm	353,000	12	93,000	702,000	12	
3	6	19 October 2023	Thursday 7:30 pm	355,000	12	92,000	717,000	9	
4	7	25 October 2023	Wednesday 7:30 pm	325,000	14	79,000	635,000	12	
4	8	26 October 2023	Thursday 7:30 pm	383,000	12	69,000	695,000	11	
5	9	1 November 2023	Wednesday 7:30 pm	328,000	14	89,000	661,000	13	
5	10	2 November 2023	Thursday 7:30 pm	353,000	11	93,000	704,000	10	
6	11	8 November 2023	Wednesday 7:30 pm	447,000	11	102,000	836,000	7	
6	12 (Note: The final episode was coded into two programs – "Grand Finale" and "The Finish Line". Because of this, two separate sets of ratings were produced.)	9 November 2023	Thursday 7:30 pm	404,000	10	84,000	763,000	9	
6	12	9 November 2023	Thursday 7:30 pm	465,000	8	65,000	833,000	7	
