= Kainakary =

- village
- Punchiri boat jetty
- Interactive map of Kainakary
- Coordinates: 9°28′0″N 76°23′0″E
- Country: India
- State: Kerala
- District: Alappuzha

Languages
  - Official: Malayalam, English
- Time zone: UTC+5:30 (IST)
- PIN: 688501
- Telephone code: 0477272
- Vehicle registration: KL-04, KL-66
- Nearest city: Alappuzha/Aleppey
- Literacy: 97.7%
- Nearest National Highway: NH-47 or NH-66[Salem-Kanyakumari]
- Nearest State Highway: SH-11 [Alappuzha- Changanacherry Road]

Kainakary is a village in Kuttanad Taluk in Alappuzha District of the Indian state of Kerala.

== History ==
Kainakary was part of the Chembakassery Dynasty.

== Geography ==
Five rivers originating from the Western Ghats, including the sacred Pamba River, drain into the Vembanad lake in the tip of Kainakary. Once a communist bastion, its literacy rate is notably better than many of its counterparts. The village is close to more than five lakes, which are vast in area. Kainakary is a shooting location for movie/TV soaps/music videos, etc. The village itself has numerous small water bodies, rivers, canals and ponds. People dwell near to canals and river banks mainly. Being part of Kuttanad, vast paddy lands make up the major part of the village. These paddy lands are below sea water level. So the rice cultivation in this area is unique and well appreciated. Floods are another major calamity that can be seen in Kainakary's history. Floods in Kuttanad are expected during every heavy monsoon season in Kerala. And Kainakary is one of the worst affected during these floods. Native people are well accustomed to these hard times, the floods leading to the destroying of crops, damages to houses and buildings. Kainakary is known for its Snake boat race rowers.

== Economy ==
The major income source of native people is from agriculture and fishing, while income from tourism is increasing. Inland water tourism using small boats, home stays, and resorts is showing tremendous presence in the past few years. Some adjacent, non-major incomes include vegetable gardens, fresh water clam farming, fish ponds, and duck farming during off-crop seasons. There is a practice of working one rice crop during monsoons and fish farming during summer in the same paddy fields around the year.

== Land reclamation ==
Path-breaking kayal land reclamation projects (agricultural land reclaimed from the Vembanad lake bed), Venad Kayal and Madathil Kayal, are located in the village. This accomplishment opened up a new era for agricultural improvements. This reclamation project was carried out by Pallithanam Mathai Luka of Kainady Village in Kuttanadu. It enabled other large scale reclamation projects in the Vembanadu lake area, making Kuttanadu the rice-bowl of Kerala.

== Population ==
According to the 2011 State Census, the population of Kainakary was 23,696 living in 5689 households. The total area is governed as two separate villages namely Kainakary North and Kainakary South.

== Places in and around Kainakary ==
Many localities collectively come under Kainakary.

- Thottuvatala
- Pallathuruthy
- Thomayiram
- Pazhupadam
- Irumpanam
- Somathuram
- Arunootampadam
- Kuppappuram
- Kuttamangalam
- Chennamkary
- Meenapalli
- Venattukad

== Transport ==
The village is 6 km from Alleppey Town and 20 km from Changanassery Town by road. The nearest rail stations are Alleppey (ALLP) and Changanassery (CGY). The nearest international airports are Kochi (COK) - 82 km and Trivandrum (TRV) - 150 km. Ferry services are available to Alappuzha (30 min), Kollam (8 Hrs), Changanacherry (3 Hrs) and Kumarakom (3 Hrs). Road Transportation is not accessible on the eastern side of the village. The inner areas of the village, where roads are still not available is connected through State Water Transport Department (SWTD) Boats. These boats run on regular intervals and costs very less to commute. The starting point for theses services are from Alappuzha Town, and Nedumudy Boat Jetty. Few boats are available through Kainakary from Kottayam, Kodimatha Boat Jetty. Since back water tourism has penetrated into the area, now travelers could hire small boats named 'Shikkara' from various end points of roads. These boats are costly and are billed based on number of hours of usage mostly.

== Accommodation ==
For travelling tourists and visitors, home stays and budget to premium resorts are available spreading the village.

== Snake boat race ==
Kainakary is the home village for the most celebrated team in Kerala's Snake Boat Race history, the United Boat Club (UBC).

== Tourism - Major Attractions ==
- Chavara Bhavan - Birth place of Saint Chavara Kuriakose Elias
- Vattakkayal House Boat Jetty - A newly built boat jetty stretching into Vattakayal Lake.
