= Chennamkary =

- village
- Interactive map of Chennamkary
- Coordinates: 9°28′0″N 76°23′0″E
- Country: India
- State: Kerala
- District: Alappuzha

Languages
  - Official: Malayalam, English
- Time zone: UTC+5:30 (IST)
- PIN: 688501
- Telephone code: 0477272
- Vehicle registration: KL-04, KL-66
- Nearest city: Alappuzha/Aleppey
- Literacy: 97.7%
- Nearest National Highway: NH-47 or NH-66[Salem-Kanyakumari]
- Nearest State Highway: SH-11 [Alappuzha- Changanacherry Road]

Chennamkary is a village in Kuttanad Taluk in Alappuzha District of Kerala state, India.

== Geography ==
Chennamkary is located 12 km east of the district headquarters Alappuzha, 4 km from Champakkulam, 141 km from the state capital Thiruvananthapuram, and is surrounded by Veliyanad Taluk towards the east, Ambalappuzha Taluk and Alappuzha Taluk towards the west, and Aryad Taluk towards the north.

Alappuzha, Changanassery, Thiruvalla, Kottayam are nearby cities.

== Economy ==
The major income is still from agriculture and fishing despite tourism. Chennamkary is also a major spot of movie/TV soap/music video shootings due to its beautiful landscape view. Saint Kuriakose Elias Chavara, one of the founding fathers and the first superior general of C.M.I., was baptized at St. Joseph's Syro-Malabar Catholic Church, Chennamkary Which is also The first Catholic Church in Asia dedicated to Saint Joseph.

== Places around Chennamkary ==
- Thottuvatala
- Pallathuruthy
- Thomayiram
- Pazhupadam
- Irumpanam
- Somathuram
- Arunootampadam
- Kuppappuram
- Kuttamangalam
- Kainakary
- Chathurthiakary
