= Bijiyashanti Tongbram =

Indian entrepreneur (born 1993)

- Born: 1993 (age 32–33); Thanga Tongbram, Bishnupur district, Manipur, India
- Other names: Bijayashanti
- Education: graduate (Botany honours ); GP Women's College; Imphal
- Occupation: entrepreneur
- Known for: First India women to make lotus silk from lotus stems.
- Parent(s): Joykumar Tongbram; Sanahal Tongbram

Bijiyashanti Tongbram (born 1993) is an Indian female entrepreneur from Manipur. She uses lotus silk to make small mufflers and stalls. Her efforts have attracted the attention of many people, including Prime Minister Narendra Modi of India and Chief Minister of Manipur N. Biren Singh. She also continues to research the medicinal properties of lotuses. After gaining some knowledge in an industrial training programme, she successfully invented fragrant lotus tea. In 2018, advice from a family friend changed her life amidst her struggle to build her business. A friend of her father informed her about how Myanmar farmers make yarn for weaving from lotus stems that bloom in the lakes.

== Early life ==
She was born in 1993 in Thanga Tongbram village in Bishnupur district of Manipur state in northeastern India. Her father Jai Kumar Tongbram is a field assistant in the fisheries department of Manipur's district and her mother is Chanahal Tongbram. Bijia graduated with honors in Botany from GP Women's College, Imphal in 2014.

== Journey ==
After graduating in 2014, Bijiashanti's initial plan was to establish agritourism in her area. However, due to lack of resources, her plans did not reach the height. Nevertheless, her experiments on the medicinal properties of the lotus continued. Later, in May 2019, with the help of a handful of women in her local area, she started spinning yarn from lotus stems and weaving neckties and mufflers. She subsequently set up an enterprise called Sanajing Sana Thambal, which has 10 women, including herself. Their firm was recently selected for Start-Up Manipur.
