= St. Joseph's Church, Chennamkary =

St. Joseph's Syro-Malabar Catholic Church (Chennamkary)
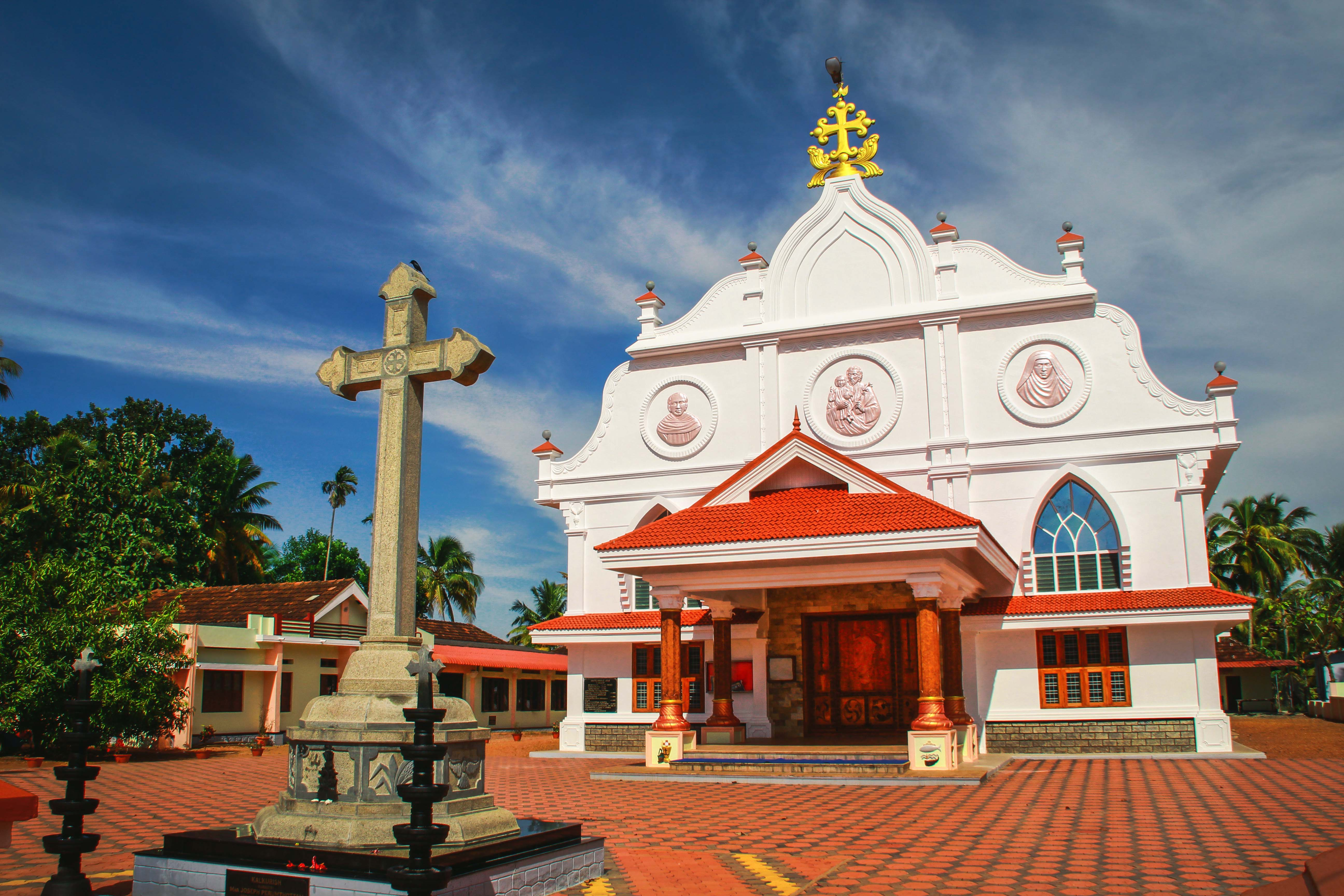

Religion
- Affiliation: Syro-Malabar Catholic Church
- District: Alappuzha District
- Leadership: Vicar: Fr. James Athikkalam, Arch Bishop: Mar Joseph Perumthottam, Archdiocese: Syro-Malabar Catholic Archeparchy of Changanacherry
- Year consecrated: AD 977

Location
- Location: Chennamkary, Alappuzha, Kerala, India
- Country: India
- Interactive map of St. Joseph's Syro-Malabar Catholic Church (Chennamkary)
- Coordinates: 9°27′22″N 76°23′54″E

Chennamkary St.Joseph's Syro-Malabar Catholic Church is a Catholic church in Kerala. It belongs to the Syro-Malabar Church under the Archeparchy of Changanacherry. It is the first church in Asia dedicated to Saint Joseph

== History ==
St. Thomas the Apostle landed in lush green Kerala which is lying between the Arabian Sea and the Western Ghats on the extreme end of India in 52 A.D. St. Thomas founded a Christian community which extended throughout Kerala by baptizing many people. It is popularly believed that as the community grew up, 7 churches namely, Maliankara, Palayoor, Paravoor (Kottakayal), Kokamangalam, Niranam, Chayal (Nilackal), Kollam and a half completed church at Thiruvankodu which were called ‘ezharapallika’l, were founded. Of these, Niranam situated close to the sea was very prominent. Christians from Niranam and Kuravilangadu and its neighbourhood immigrated to the present Kuttanadu which was abounded with kandal forests in those days-later this area was converted into fertile paddy fields-. Most of the immigrant Christians settled in Kalloorkadu area. They had to depend on the distant Niranam church for worship. As it had been extremely difficult to travel to Niranam, the faithful of Kalloorkadu erected a church in the locality in 427 A.D. Some 550 years passed by. In the meantime more and more Christians had immigrated to different parts of Kuttanadu. The Christians who had been living in scattered settlements in and around Chennamkary found it extremely hard to depend on Kalloorkadu church for worship. Therefore, the elders of 11 powerful families of Chennamkary, Nedumudi and Kainakari areas met and decided to erect a church in Chennamkary. After getting the required sanction from political and church authorities, a church was erected in Chennamkary with the united effort of the faithful on 1 August 977 A.D. Though it is not known for certain what materials were used for the construction of the church, it is generally believed that it was built with palm leaf and bamboo. Later in 1201, the main portion of the church was renovated with stone and lime mortar. The wings in the south and north were built in 1300. Later the southern wing was pulled apart to construct the cemetery. Prior to the construction of the cemetery, the dead were buried in different parts of the church yard. The ‘mondalam’(roof) was constructed in 1601. Chennamkary had been included in the list of churches under the jurisdiction of Varapuzha Diocese published in 1786 which is entered in the History of Indian Church written by Rev.Fr. Xavier Koodapuzha. No other document about the history of Chennamkary church between 1800 and the famous Coonan cross Oath of 1653 is available.

== St. Kuriakose Elias Chavara And Darsanathirunnal ==
St. Kuriakose Elias Chavara who is the pride of Kerala was born in Chennamkari parish in 1805 and was baptized at Chennamkari church. The granite baptismal font which witnessed the sacred rite still adorns the church. St. Kuriakose Elias Chavara was ordained in 1829. Through the efforts of Rev.Fr. kuriakose Elias, the first ... (Darsana samuham) dedicated to St. Joseph in India and Asia was founded in Chennamkari in 1836 vide the decree of Pope Gregory XVI which was sent through H.E. Mar Sauriar, the Bishop of Varapuzha Diocese. Those who assumed the Presidency of the Darsana samuham each year became the prasudenthi. The Sunday following 14 September (the thirunnal of the Veneration of the Cross), the Darsanathirunnal of St. Joseph is celebrated. The Darsanathirunnal has been conducted by prasudenthis without lapse except during the construction period of the present church building. As more unity and co-operation was required for the construction of the church building, the Darsanathirunnal had been conducted commonly by the parishners during the construction of the church.

== The New Church ==
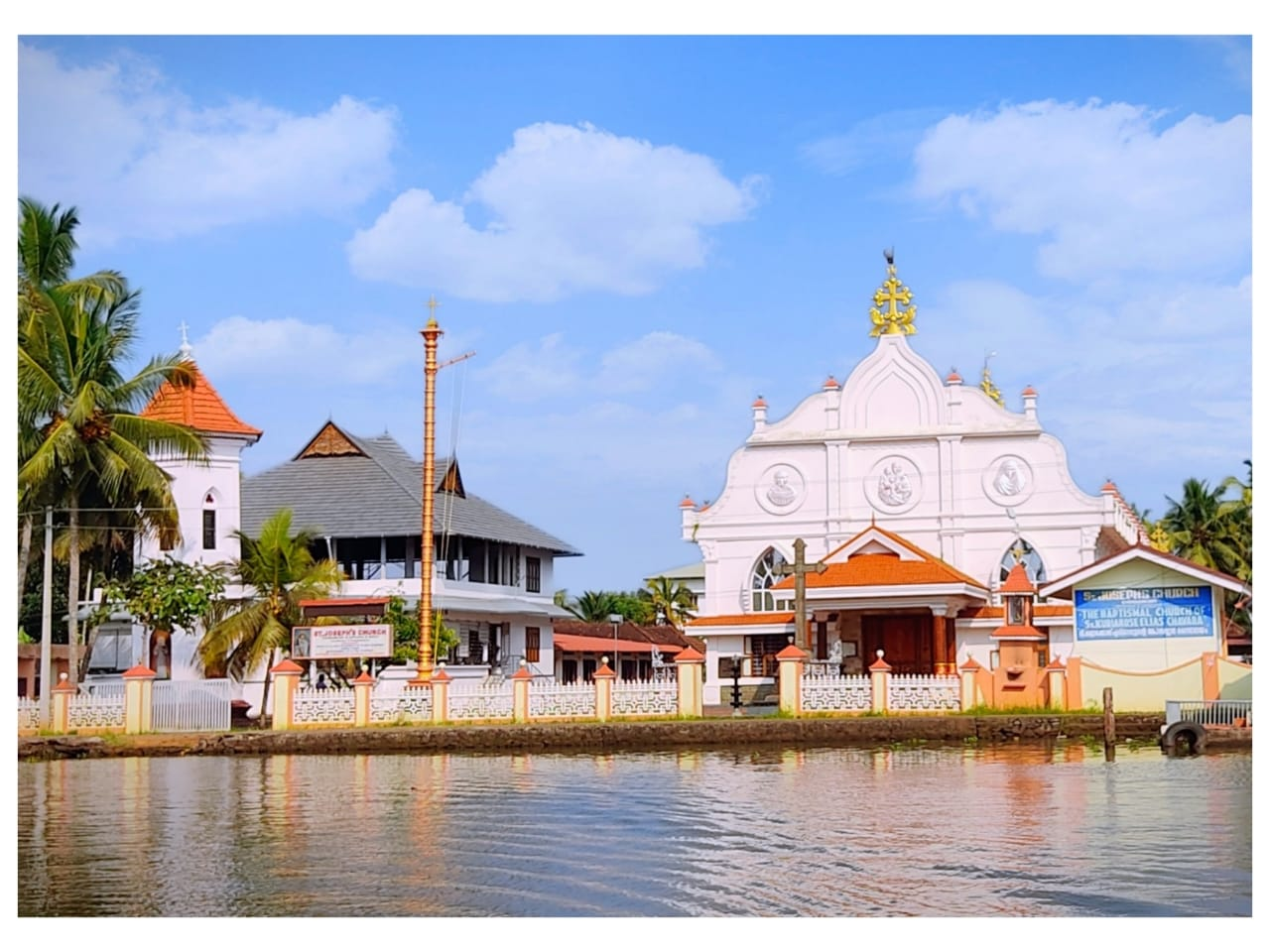

Though the ancient church was majestic, it began to show the signs of aging. Therefore, it was decided to pull apart the church and to build a new church during the tenure of Rev.Fr. Joseph Thumbayil. Rev. Fr. Thomas Kizhakkedath who succeeded Fr. Thumbayil established a fund for the renovation of the church. Under the leadership of his successor, Rev. Fr. Thomas Peelianickal and the convener, the old church was pulled apart. The construction of the new church began in 1994. The newly constructed church was consecrated on 21 December 1997 by H.E. Mar Joseph Powathil. Rev.Fr. Thomas Alumparampil who succeeded Fr. Peelianickal paid off the debts incurred due to the construction of the church and started a fund for the erection of a kodimaram(flag pole).A chapel was erected in the cemetery during his tenure.

The manimalika at Chennamkari church is as reputed and ancient as Chennamkari church. Though the building had developed a slant, it enjoys a pride place in the heart of the parishners. The two storeyed vicarage was renovated under the leadership of Rev.Fr. Xavier Vettuthiruthel and the trustees in 1975.A new kodimaram (flag pole) much more beautiful but ancient looking similar to the former beautiful and famous kodimaram was erected under the leadership of the then vicar Rev.Fr. Joseph Poovathusseril and the convener in 2005.

== Church At Glance ==
- Parish : Chennamkary
- Forane : Champakulam
- Diocese : Changanacherry
- Patron : Saint Joseph
- First Church : AD 977
- Priests : 1
- Vicar : Fr. James Athikkalam
- Catholic Families : 387
- Phone : 0477-2724237

== Institutions under the Parish ==
- CML
- Yuvadeephity - KCYM
- St. Vincent De Paul Society
- Kuttanadu Vikasana Samithy
- Mathrujyothis
- Pithruvedi
- St. Franciscan Organization
- Deva Matha High School
- Adoration Convent (SABS)
