= Sunye Lake =

Lake in Myanmar

- Location within Myanmar
- Location: Mandalay Region
- Coordinates: 21°40′N 96°13′E
- Type: reservoir
- Basin countries: Myanmar

Sunye Lake (Burmese: စွန်ရဲကန်; also spelt Sont Ye Lake), also known as Sunye In (Burmese: စွန်ရဲအင်း), is a Myanmar freshwater natural lake located near Kyaukse and Sintgaing, the large inland body of standing water measures approximately 4 square miles (10 km^{2}) and is known as "little Inle".

The Shan Yoma Mountain Ranges are situated to the east of the Lake. Sunye Lake is a tourist destination and famous for its blossoming lotus flowers in the rainy season and migratory birds in the winter. The lake is designated as protected wetlands for conservation and to regulate development. Sunye Lake is also a major source of lotus stems used in the production of lotus silk. Three major varieties of lotus are grown on the lake, namely padonma kya, blue lotus (ကြာပုတီး, lit. 'lotus bead'), and red lotus.

Sunye Lake has existed for generations and has a history repair and maintenance by ancient kings.
