= Kainakary North =

- village
- Location in Kerala, India Kainakary North (India)
- Coordinates: 9.5040200°N 76.382360°E
- Country: India
- State: Kerala
- District: Alappuzha

Population (2011)
  - Total: 8,292

Languages
  - Official: Malayalam, English
- Time zone: UTC+5:30 (IST)

Kainakary North is a village in Alappuzha district in the Indian state of Kerala.

== Demographics ==
As of 2011 India census, Kainakary North had a population of 8292 with 4081 males and 4211 females.
