= Lotus silk =

Type of textile

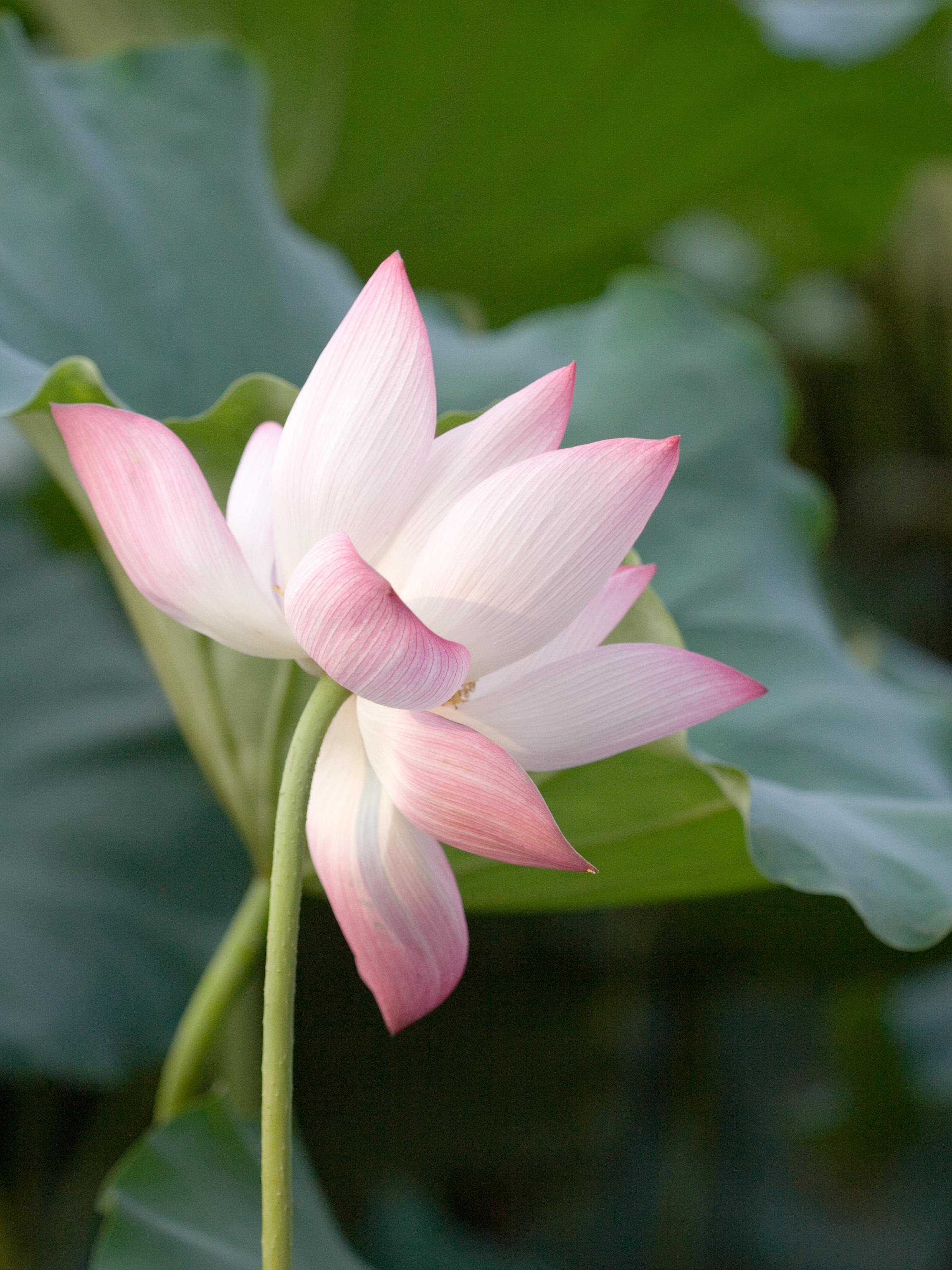
The flower and stem of the species (Nelumbo nucifera) used in lotus silk.

Lotus silk (Burmese: ပိုးကြာချည် or Burmese: ကြာချည်, lit. 'lotus thread') is a type of textile produced using delicate lotus stem fibers. The fabric first originated in Myanmar (Burma) and is now largely produced in Siem Reap, Cambodia. Some small cottage workshops start experimenting in Vietnam and India as well. Due to the complexity and labor-intensive nature of weaving lotus fibers, lotus silk is considered one of the most expensive fabrics in the world. Lotus silk uses fibres from a specific variety of lotus called padonma kya (ပဒုမ္မာကြာ), which produces large, fragrant pink flowers.

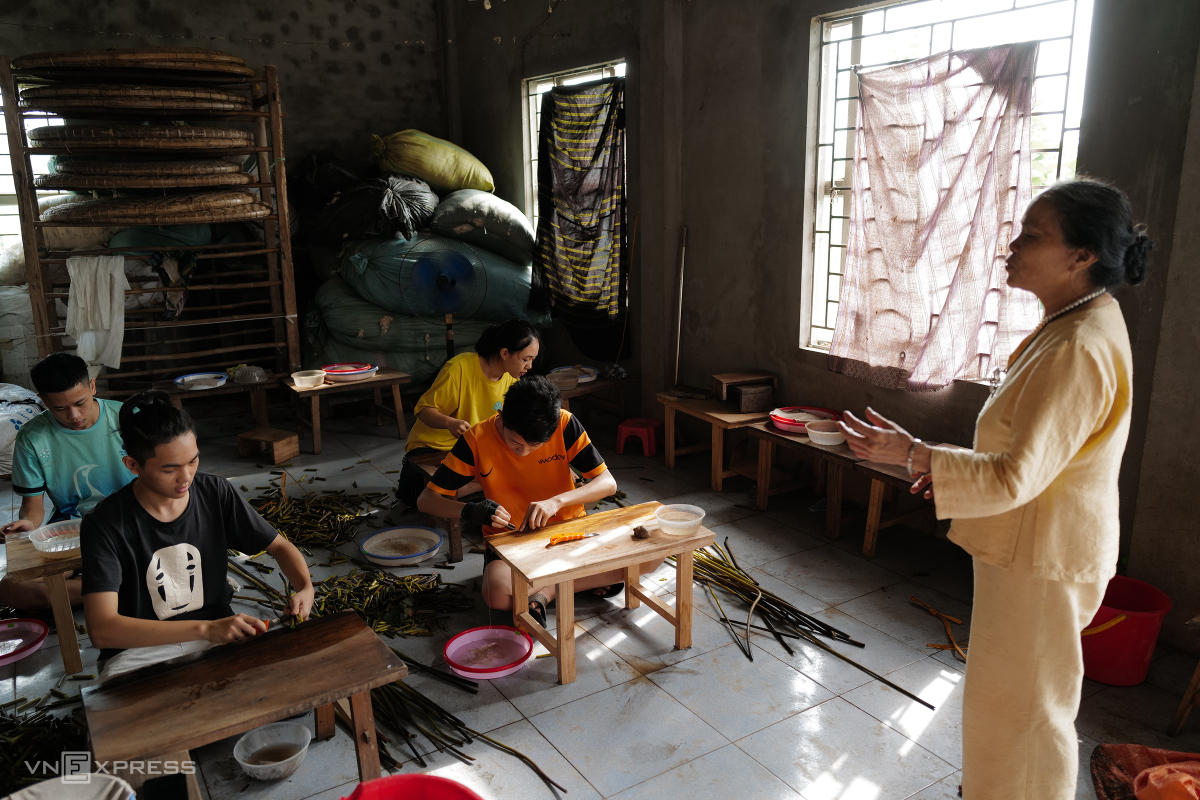
Vietnamese artisans teach how to make lotus silk.

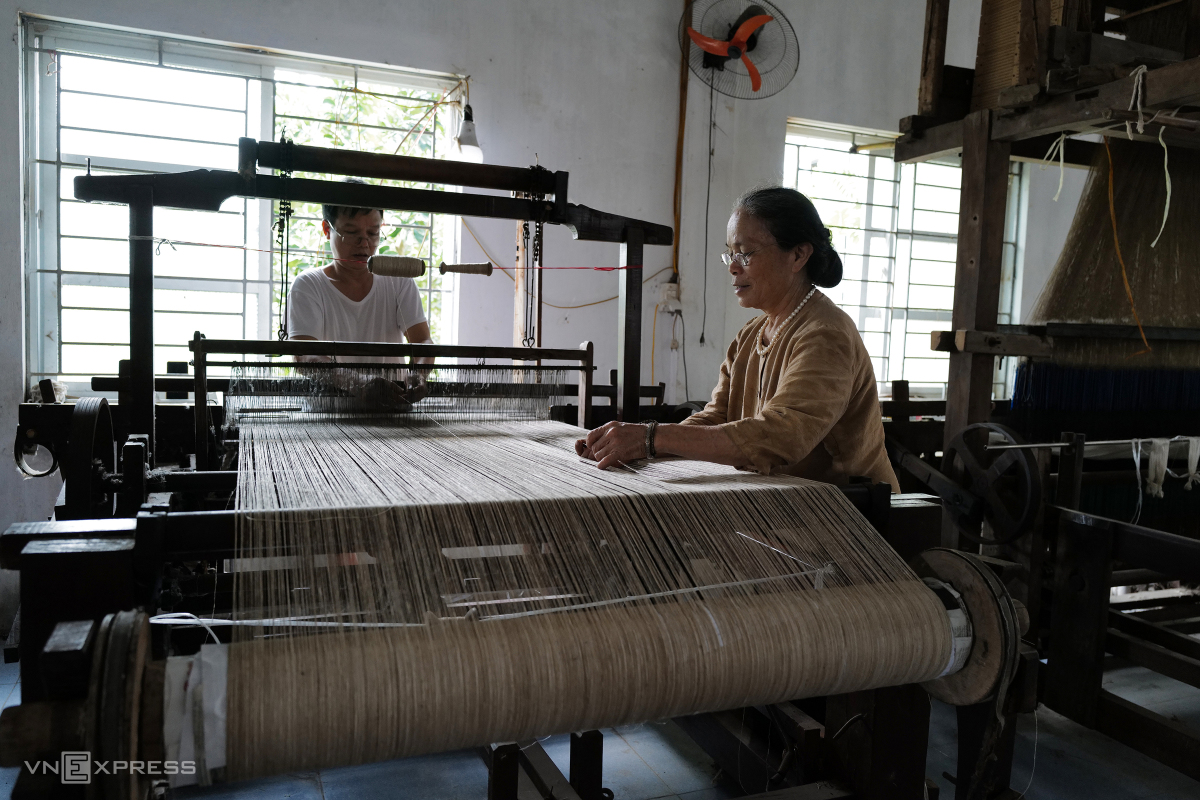
Vietnamese artisans use looms to weave lotus silk.

== Lotus sources ==
In Myanmar, lotus stems are sourced from lakes throughout Myanmar, including Shan State's Inle Lake, Sunye Lake in Mandalay Region's Sintkaing Township; Inma Lake in Bago Region's Thegon Township; Wetthe and Salin Natural Lakes in Magway Region's Salin Township; and Kandaunggyi Lake in Sagaing Region's Taze Township.

In Cambodia, most of lotus stems are collected from the edge of the Tonle Sap lake in Siem Reap.

In Vietnam, lotus stems are sourced from the large lakes of Hanoi.

== History ==
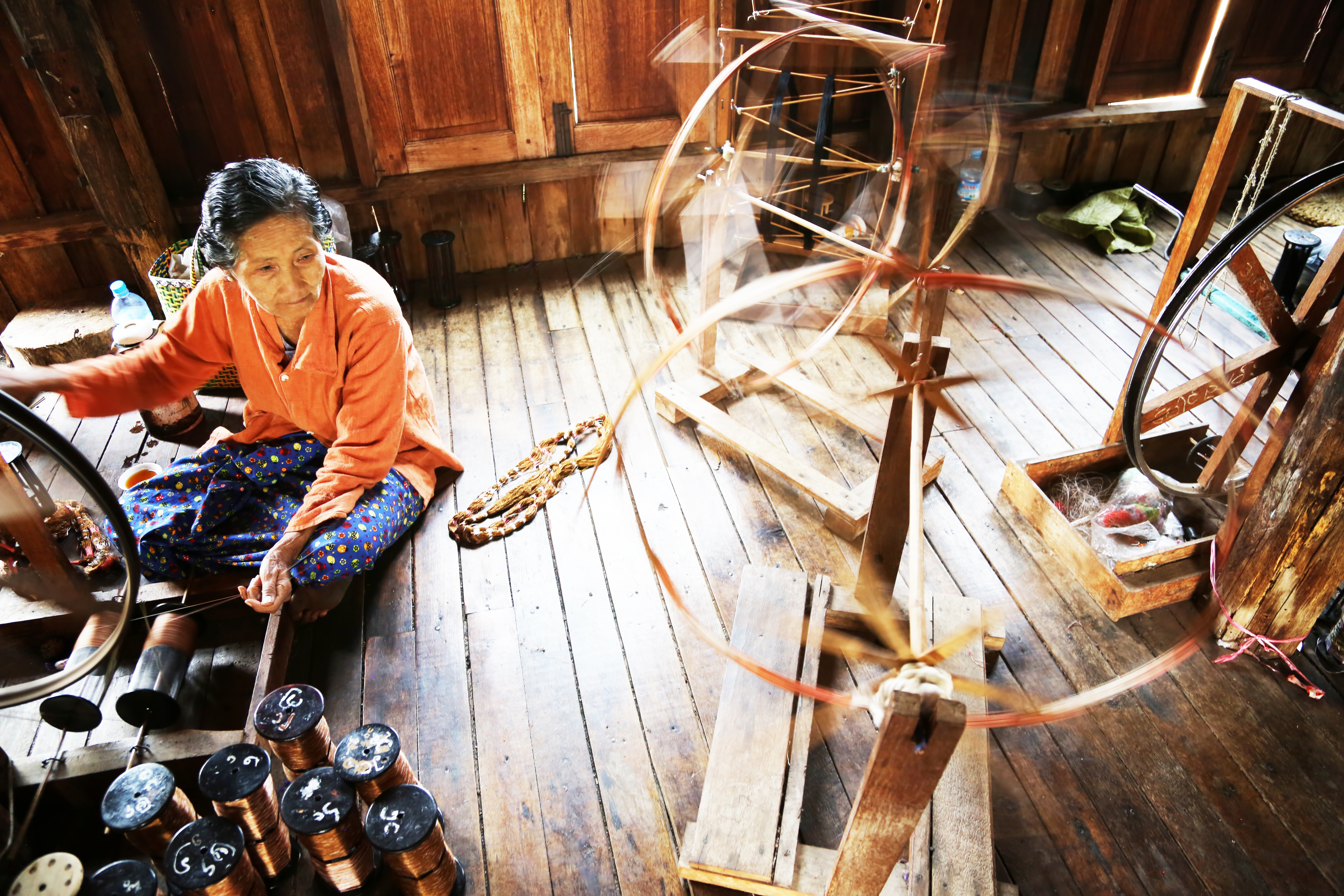
A weaver in Inle Lake spools lotus silk threads.

Lotus silk weaving originated in Inle Lake in Myanmar's Shan State. Lotus weaving was invented by an ethnic Intha woman named Sa Oo in the village of Kyaingkhan in the early 1900s. She first wove a Buddhist monastic robe using lotus fibers, called kya thingan (ကြာသင်္ကန်း), as an offering to the abbot of a local monastery, and offered similar monastic robes to the principal Buddha images at Phaung Taw Oo Pagoda. The tradition of robe-weaving has a long history in Myanmar; during the Tazaungdaing festival, robe-weaving competitions are held throughout major Burmese pagodas.

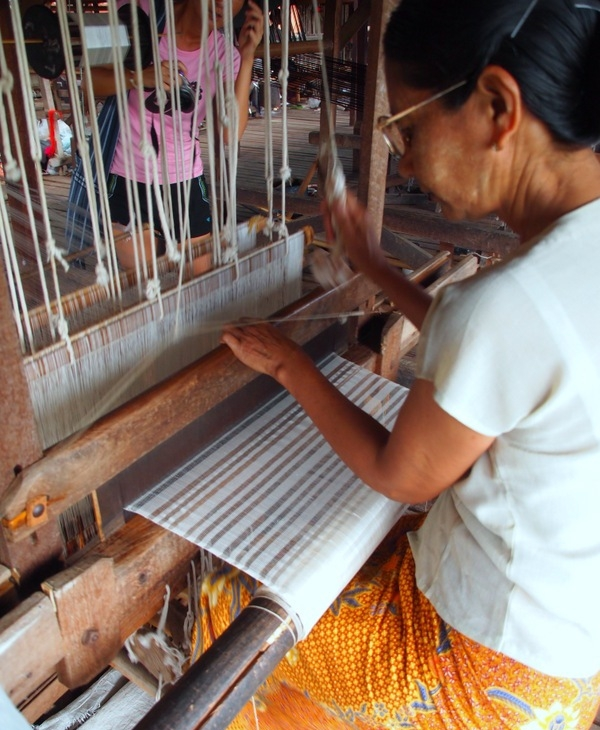
A Burmese weaver uses a handloom to weave lotus silk.

The weaving practice went extinct after her death, and was subsequently revived by her relatives, Tun Yee and Ohn Kyi, who began a cooperative to modernize and systematize the weaving practice.

In 2017, Phan Thi Thuan, a weaver near Hanoi, introduced the weaving practice to Vietnam. She has successfully researched and made lotus silk. To pull 25 kg of silk thread, she needs 100 tons of lotus stems.

In 2019, Bijiyashanti Tongbram from Manipur, India, began making lotus silk using lotus stems gathered from the Loktak Lake.

== Properties ==
Unlike real silk (a protein fiber), but like most plant fibers, lotus silk is a cellulose fiber. Its composed mostly of cellulose, hemicellulose and lignin and contains higher amounts of lignin and hemicellulose than other common plant fibers. It's hydrophobic, and it reacts to various chemicals similarly to cotton fiber. According to one study, lotus silk density of 1.1848 g/cm3 was lower than cotton, wool and silk, but comparable to acrylic. Two studies found linear density of lotus silk to be 1.55 and 2.2 dtex.

== Uses ==
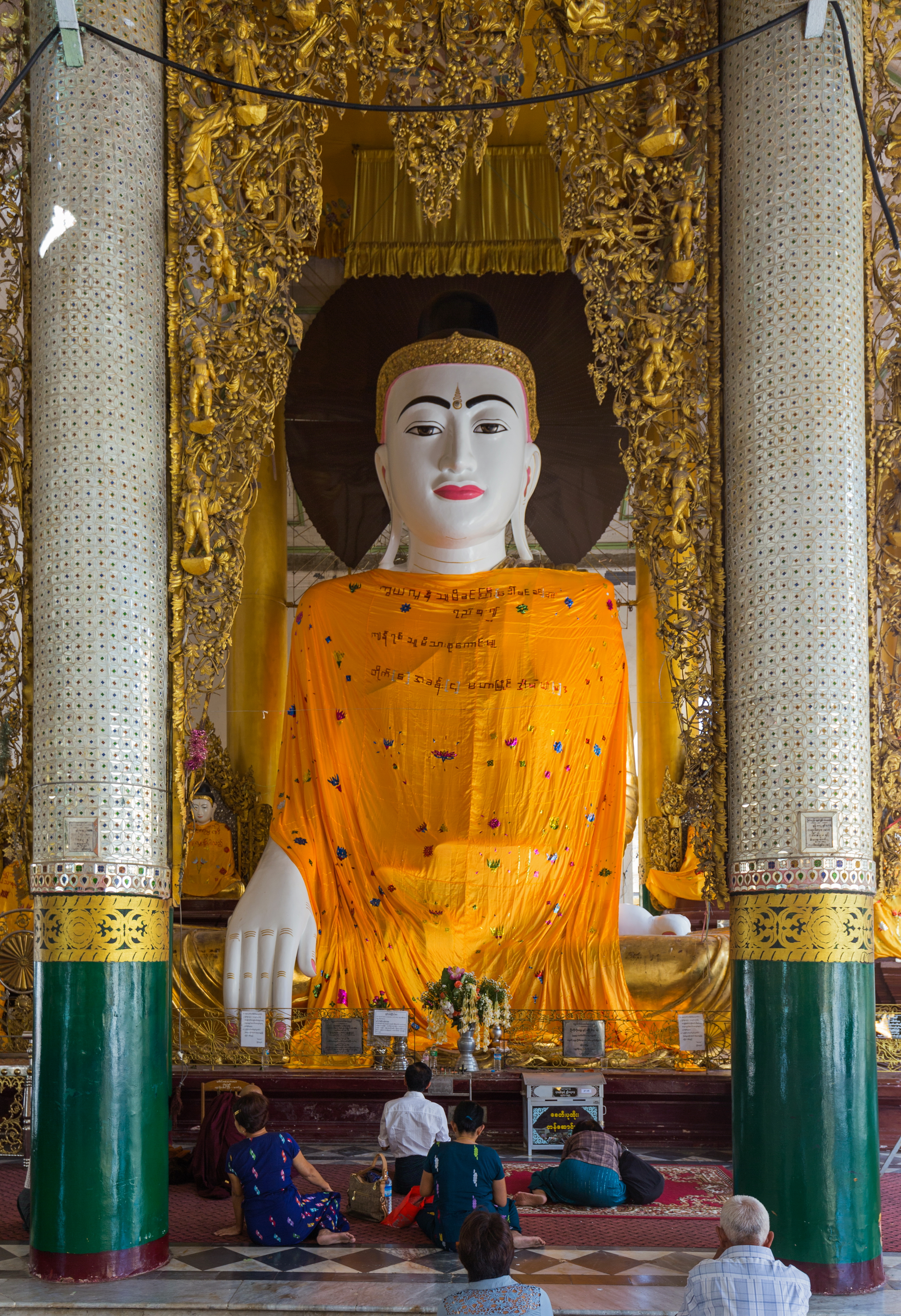
An image of the Buddha at Shwedagon Pagoda is draped with saffron-coloured fabric robes decorated with embroidered lotuses.

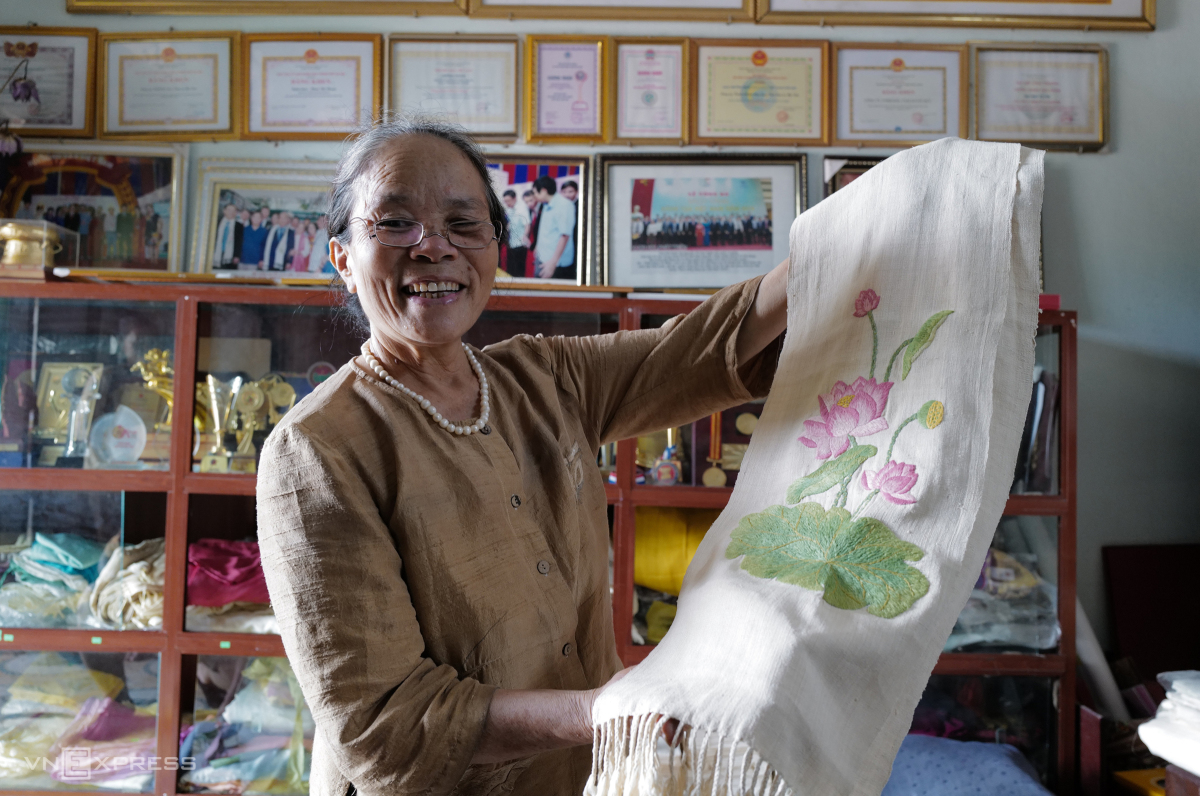
A lotus silk shawl in Vietnam.

Lotus silk was first used to weave monastic robes as an offering to Buddha images or Buddhist monks, but is now also used for a variety of clothing types, including scarves and hats.

Loro Piana, a luxury clothing company, has imported Burmese lotus silk to produce jackets and other clothing products since 2010.

== See also ==
- Burmese clothing
