= Kainakary South =

- village
- Location in Kerala, India Kainakary South (India)
- Coordinates: 9.4892900°N 76.384020°E
- Country: India
- State: Kerala
- District: Alappuzha

Population (2011)
  - Total: 15,405

Languages
  - Official: Malayalam, English
- Time zone: UTC+5:30 (IST)

Kainakary South is a village in Alappuzha district in the Indian state of Kerala.

== Demographics ==
As of the 2011 Indian census, Kainakary South had a population of 15405 with 7364 males and 8041 females.
