= Kuttamangalam =

- village
- Location in Kerala, India Kuttamangalam (India)
- Coordinates: 10°23′0″N 76°8′0″E
- Country: India
- State: Kerala
- District: Thrissur

Population (2011)
  - Total: 17,400

Languages
  - Official: Malayalam, English
- Time zone: UTC+5:30 (IST)

Kuttamangalam is a village in Thrissur district in the Indian state of Kerala.

== Demographics ==
As of 2011 India census, Kuttamangalam had a population of 17400 with 8599 males and 8801 females.
