= Kantheesangal =

Kantheesangal or Qadishangal (Malayalam: കന്ദീശങ്ങൾ, romanized: Kandīśaṅṅaḷ) are two of the many common Malayalam (and its English) renderings of a Syriac term meaning 'the holy ones'.

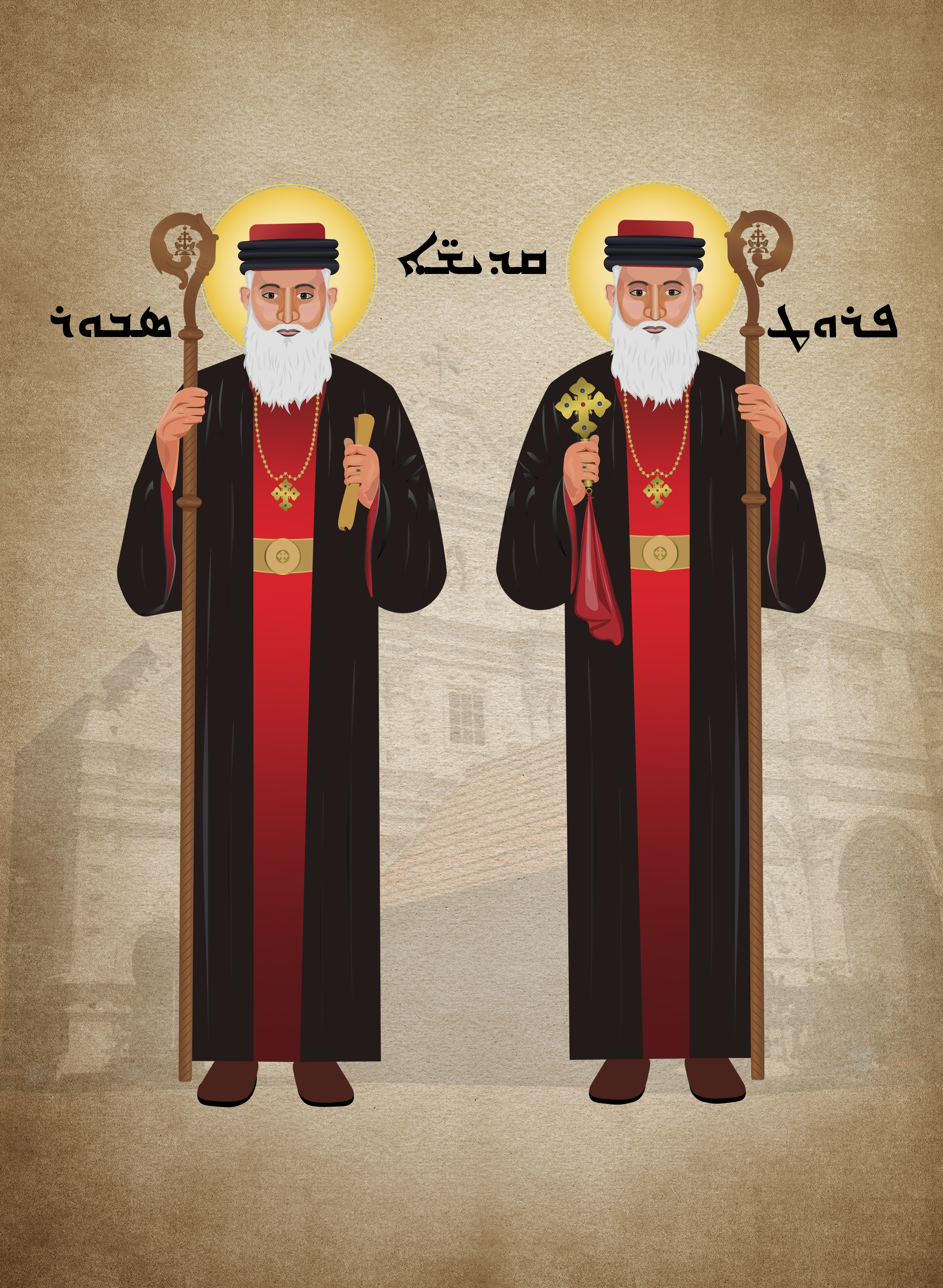
Mar Sabor and Mar Proth, referred to as Kantheesangal in Malayalam

In the Oriental Orthodox churches of Kerala, this term refers to Mar Sabor and Mar Aphroth, while the Catholic Church in Kerala uses the term to refer to Saints Gervasius and his twin brother Protasius.

== Etymology ==
The term comes from Classical Syriac: ܩܲܕܝܼܫܹ̈ܐ, romanized: Qaddīšē, meaning saints with the Malayalam plural suffix Malayalam: -ങ്ങൾ, romanized: -ṅṅaḷ.

== The Kantheesangal and St. Thomas Christians ==
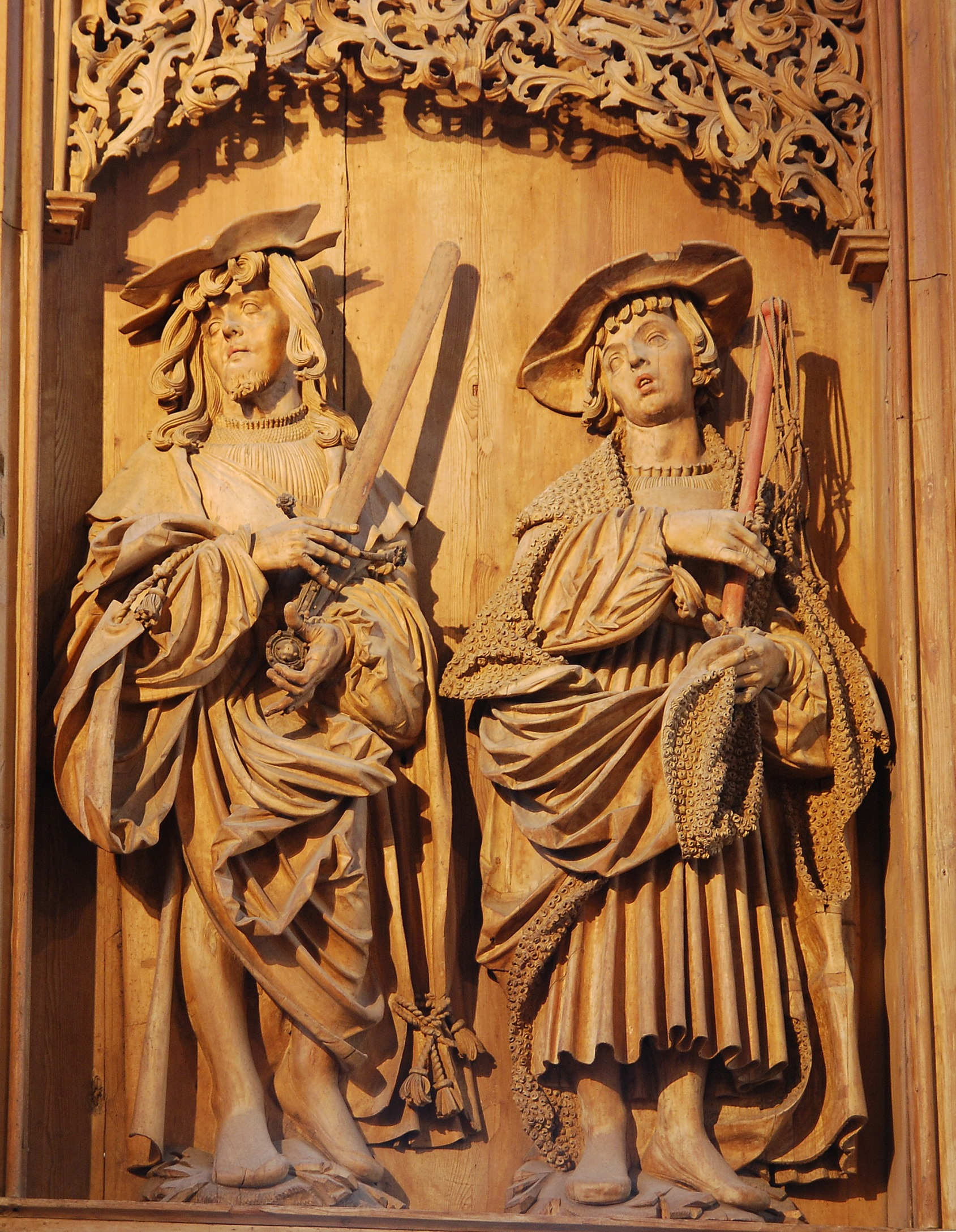
Catholic saints Gervasius and Protasius

Circa AD 825, Persian bishops, Mar Sabor and Mar Aphroth of the Church of the East arrived in Kerala, establishing many churches, many of which were later consecrated after them under the name Kantheesangal. However, after the Synod of Diamper, most of these churches were later reconsecrated, either to all saints or to the Catholic twin saints Gervasius and Protasius, as Sabor and Proth were not considered saints of the Catholic Church.

== Churches dedicated to the Kantheesangal in Kerala ==
=== The Catholic Church ===
==== Syro Malabar Catholic Church ====
===== Ecclesiastical province of Ernakulam-Angamaly =====
- Major Archeparchy of Ernakulam-Angamaly

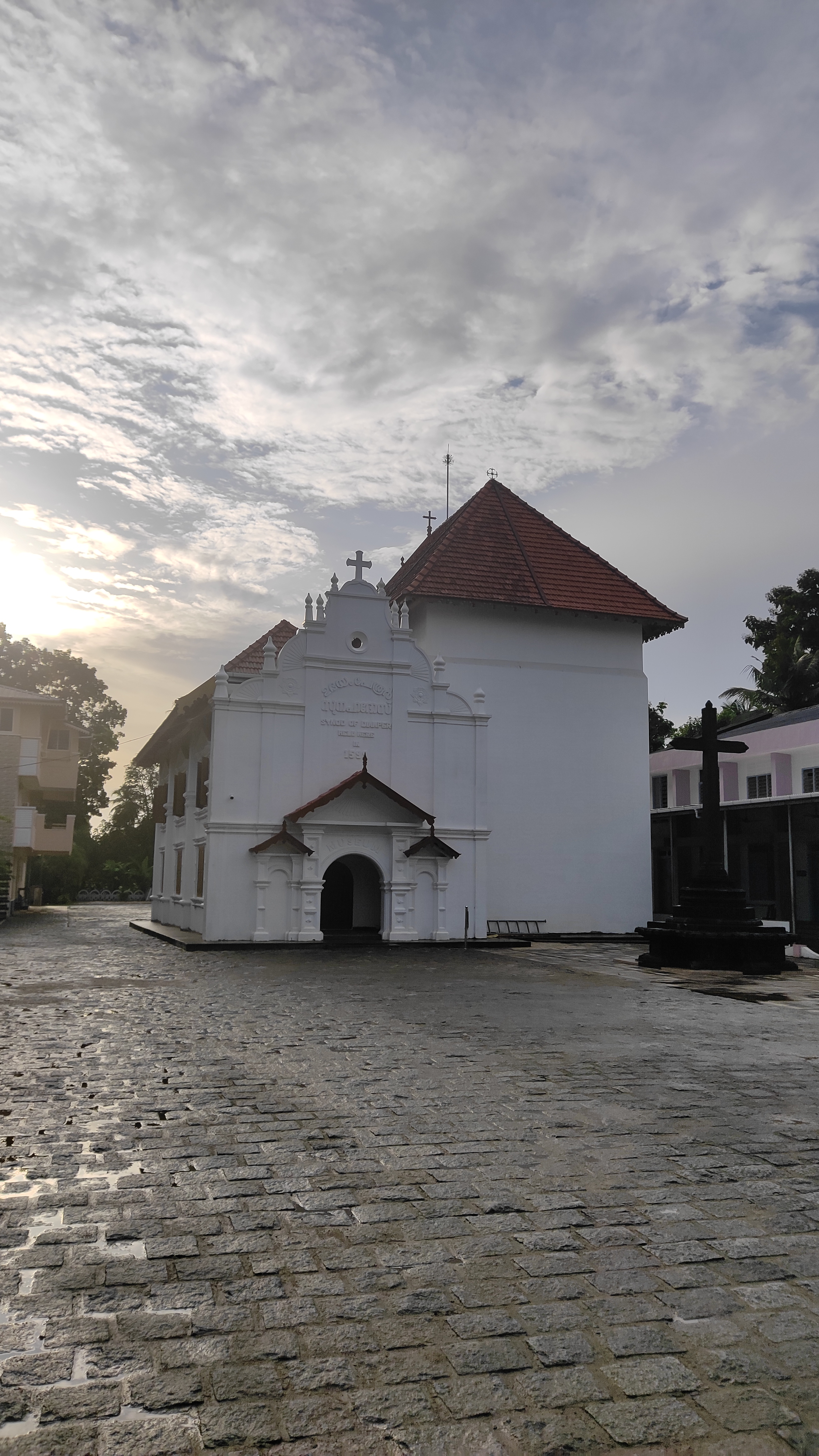
Saints Gervasius and Protasius Synod Syro Malabar Catholic Church, Udayamperur

  - Saints Gervasius and Protasius Synod Church, Udayamperoor
  - Saints Gervasius and Protasius Church, Akaparambu

===== Ecclesiastical province of Changanassery =====
- Eparchy of Palai
  - Saints Gervasius and Protasius Forane Church, Kothanallur

=== The Oriental Orthodox Churches ===
==== Malankara Jacobite Syrian Orthodox Church ====
- Diocese of Angamaly

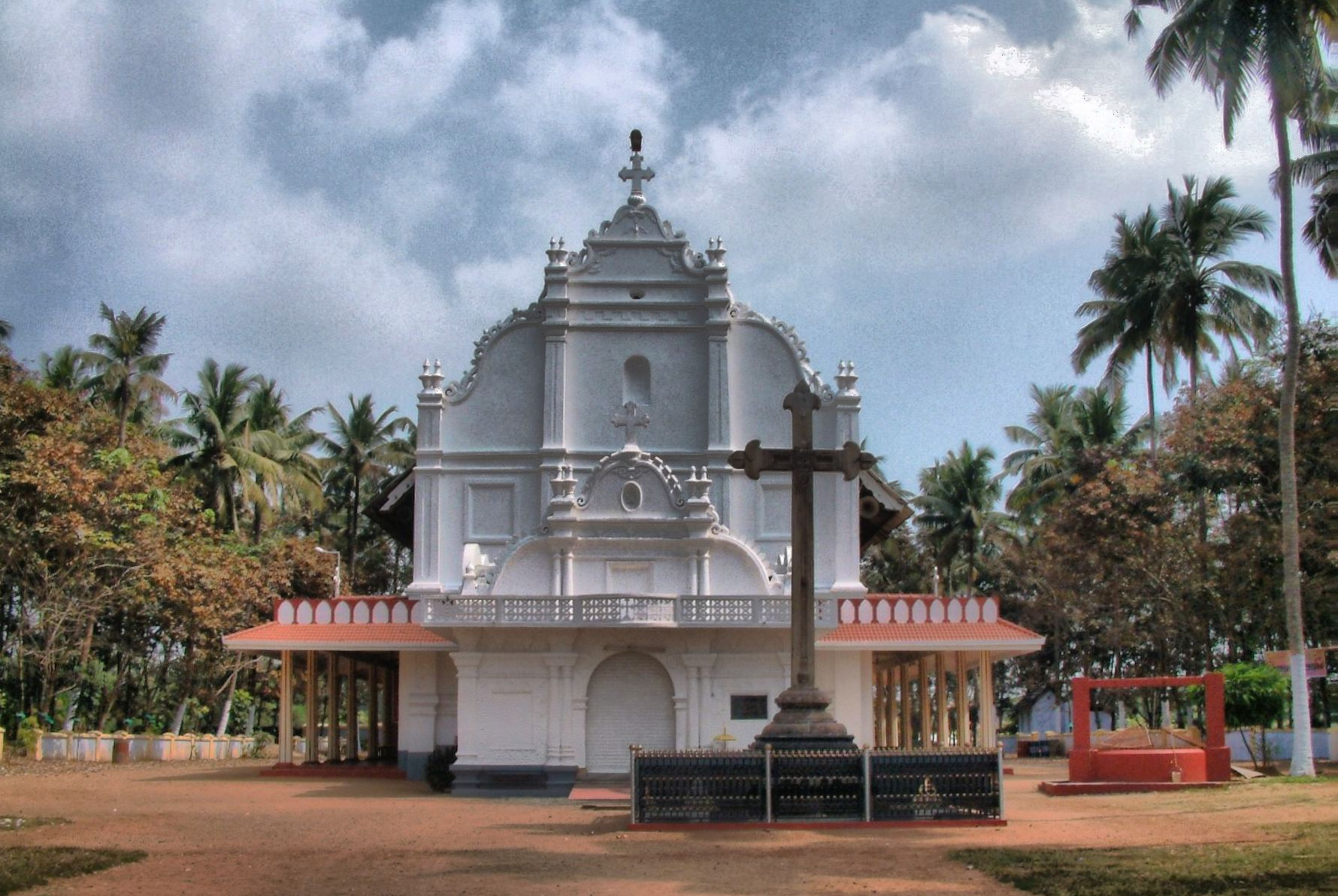
Mar Sabor and Mar Afroth Jacobite Syrian Church, Akaparambu

  - Mar Sabor and Mar Afroth Church, Akaparambu

== See also ==
- Gervasius and Protasius
- Mar Sabor and Mar Proth
