= Udayamperoor Old Church =

Gervasis and Protasis Church
- Gervasis and Protasis Synodal Church, Udayamperoor
- Malayalam: ഉദയംപേരൂർ പള്ളി, romanized: Udayampērūṟ Paḷḷi
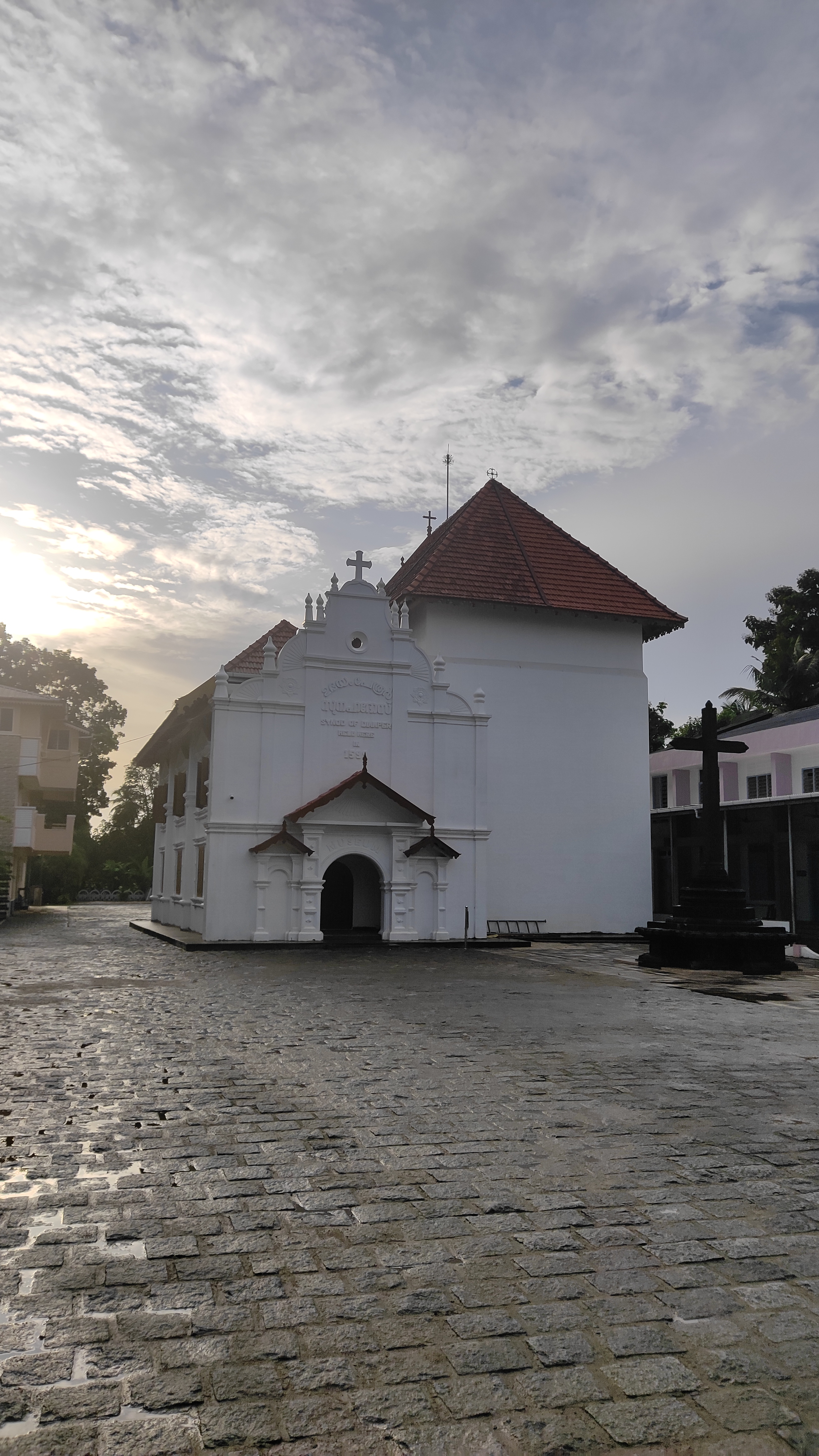
- Udayamperoor Old Church (right) and the adjacent Synodal Museum (left)
- Location: Udayamperoor, Kerala
- Country: India
- Denomination: Syro-Malabar Catholic Church
- Previous denomination: Church of the East
- Website: synodofdiamper.com

History
- Former name(s): All Saints' Church; Sabor and Aphroth Church; Marth Mariam Church
- Dedication: Gervasius and Protasius
- Earlier dedication: Marth Mariam; Sabor and Proth (pre-1599)

Administration
- Archdiocese: Ernakulam-Angamaly

Clergy
- Archbishop: Raphael Thattil
- Vicar: Sebastian Urakkadan

Gervasis and Prothasis Church, popularly called the Udayamperoor Old Church or the Udayamperoor Synodal Church, is a Syro-Malabar church located in Udayamperoor, Kerala, India. This is one of the prominent church buildings of Saint Thomas Christians and was the venue of the Udayamperoor Synod, held under Alexis Menezes in 1599. It is a parish church under the Ernakulam-Angamaly Archeparchy of the Syro-Malabar Church. Adjacent to the old church, there is a museum, and a newer church building also operates within the church premises.

== History ==
=== Early history ===
==== Origin ====
The old church in Udayamperoor is traditionally dated to the 6th century and is believed to have been established in 510 AD. Church historian Bernard Thoma states that it was founded by the then Villarvattom king. Subsequent history of the church is largely obscure. According to Saint Thomas Christian tradition, Sabor and Aphroth, two 9th century Persian East Syriac bishops, rebuilt the church along with multiple other churches across Malabar coast. Local tradition says that when the town of Kodungallur was destroyed due to civil unrest, Sabor and Aproth, who were residing there, moved to Udayamperoor. For this reason, the 17th century Portuguese accounts such as the 'Jornada of Menezes' call it a former episcopal see.

==== Association with the Villarvattom dynasty ====
By the 15th century, Udayamperoor definitely housed the headquarters of the Villarvattom (Villāṟvaṭṭam) (Portuguese: Beliarte) dynasty. Villarvattom is known for its association with the Saint Thomas Christian community, with traditions saying that it was indeed a Christian dynasty. Thoma of Villarvattom, the last king to reign in the dynasty, is said to have died in 1502 and entombed in the Udayamperoor Church. A tombstone inscription documenting his death is preserved among many such funeral epitaphs in the Synodal Church. However, in the Travancore Archaeological Series, Ayyar has questioned the 16th century dating and instead provides 1701 as the accurate year in the inscription.

Tōmmā-rājāvu of Villarvatțam who was risiding at Chēnōnnalam died on the 9th (day), of the 2nd (month) of (the year) 1701.

— Ayyar 1927, p. 68

==== Under the Southists ====
By the end of the 16th century, Udayamperoor church became one of the strongholds of the Southists (Knanaya Christians) and was one among their five chief churches (others being Kaduthuruthy (Kaṭutturutti), Kottayam (Kōṭṭayam), Thodupuzha (Toṭupuḻa) and Kallishery (Kalliśśēri)). They migrated to Udayamperoor after the fall of Kodungallur (Koṭungallūṟ) to the Sāmutiri King in 1521. Northists (Non-Knanaya Saint Thomas Christians) and Southists did not intermarry and often clashed over parish administration. The church came under the exclusive control of the Southists with the support of the Portuguese. Therefore the Northists were forced to shift to the new parish which they had established in a nearby village called Kandanad (Kaṅṭanāṭŭ). Francisco Roz documents the bitter rivalry between the Southists and Northists that often erupted as disputes between the two parishes. These disputes eventually spread to other churches which were under collective ownership such as Kaduthuruthy, Thodupuzha and Kottayam. This also forced the Southists to increasingly align themselves with the Portuguese who were in conflict with the larger Saint Thomas Christian community.

=== Synod of Udayamperoor ===
In 1599, Udayamperoor church became the venue for the Synod convened by Alexis Menezes, the Portuguese colonial Archbishop of Goa. The synod was originally expected to take place in Angamaly, the archdiocesan headquarters. However Menezes disliked Angamaly as it was a stronghold of Giwargis of Cross, the Saint Thomas Christian archdeacon, and as its ruler (Alaṅṅāṭṭŭ Kaimaḷ) was not in good terms with the Portuguese. Hence, the venue was shifted to Udayamperoor where the large Southist population was friendly with the Portuguese missionaries. Menezes was also supported by the King of Cochin who was in good terms with the Portuguese. The synod was convened following the death of Metropolitan Abraham and was intended to terminate their hierarchical relationship with the Chaldean Catholic Patriarchate and to bring them under the Portuguese Padroado rule.

The Synod was held in June 1599 under presidency of Alexis de Menezes, as the culmination of their latinization efforts among the local Saint Thomas Christians. The Synod was attended by 153 priests and 671 representatives from 168 locations. Most of these were pro-Portuguese, and more than 100 of the priests who participated were ordained by Menezes himself. In preparation to the synod, he performed mass priestly ordinations in Udayamperoor, despite the strong protests of the archdeacon. The synod was held inside and around the church. Multiple priests celebrated Holy Qurbana on each side of the stone cross located in front of the church during the synod. It was this Synod that removed Sabor and Aproth as the parish saints of the church and rededicated it in the name of 'All Saints'. After the synod, a large part of the ancient documents preserved in the church, including the East Syriac liturgical texts, were destroyed under the leadership of Menezes.

==== Coonan Cross Oath and schism ====
Udayamperoor Church was one of the few parishes that stood with the Portuguese when Archdeacon Thoma was proclaimed Metropolitan following the Coonan Cross Oath against Portuguese hegemony. After this incident, the pope sent Giuseppe Maria Sebastiani, a Carmelite priest, as Apostolic Vicar to Malabar in order to resolve the division, and the majority of the Saint Thomas Christians joined him. Since then the Udayamperoor church came under the Vicariate of Malabar.

=== Later history ===
==== Tipu's arsonage and Tharakan's reconstruction ====
During the Malabar military campaign of the Mysore ruler Tipu Sultan, the church was attacked and the roof was torn down. The remains of the market near the church were piled inside the church and burned, the facade of the church was demolished and cannons were installed there. This church building, which was on the verge of destruction, was rebuilt at the initiative of Thachil Mathu Tharakan.

==== Financial despair ====
The continuous disputes between the two factions also hindered the progress of the church. Church property was being encroached upon due to mishandling and the church was in financial despair. The church fell into a heavy financial debt and to resolve this, 12,000 chakram was borrowed from the Angamaly Church in exchange for its Portuguese era church bell. This bell is now preserved in Angamaly.

In 1887, the pope permanently separated the Syro-Malabar Christians from the latin hierarchy and the Udayamperoor church was included in the Apostolic vicariate of Kottayam. Due to financial difficulties, the church could not pay the one-fourth share of income to the vicariate. For this reason, Charles Lavigne, the then Vicar apostolic, seized the golden chalice that was in the church and took it with him. It was returned to the church after Wladyslav Zalesky's order at the request of an assembly held at Kuravilangad.

==== Southists vacating the Church ====
Gradually, conflicts between the Northists and Southists residing in Udayamperoor widened and the latter, who were relatively few in number, migrated from here to other places, such as Thodupuzha, Piravom, Kaduthuruthy and Vadavukode, over time.

In 1896, the church was included in the newly established Vicariate of Ernakulam. With the establishment of a separate vicariate for the Knanaya Catholics in 1911 and the Udayamperoor church continuing within the Vicariate of Ernakulam, most of the Knanaya completely severed their ties with the Udayamperoor church. The few remaining Knanaya families in Udayamperoor were added to Karippadam parish, which was part of the Knanaya vicariate.

== Architecture ==
The Udayamperoor Church is built in a blend of Portuguese and Kerala styles, which is common to most of the old churches in Kerala. According to tradition, this church was built by the Villarvattom kings. Archaeological findings of the foundation prove that this church was built before the Portuguese. However, the main attractions of the church, such as the façade and pulpit, date back to the Portuguese period. The foundation of the church is made of large laterite stones. The walls of the church are more than 130 centimeters in thickness. Unlike many other ancient churches, this church did not have raredos in its sanctuary. However, when the church was renovated in 2023, this was also added.

According to the chronicles of the church, it was severely damaged during Tipu Sultan's military raid to Malabar in the 18th century. Tipu's army piled the roof of the church and the remains of the destroyed market inside the church and set it on fire. In addition, the Mysore army demolished the facade of the church at the same level as the wall, filled it with earth, and installed cannons there. Archaeological studies conducted on the church revealed traces of ash, but the absence of burnt tiles suggests that the roof was thatched at the time. After this incident, the church, which had been in ruins, was rebuilt under the leadership of Thachil Mathu Tharakan, a wealthy Christian entrepreneur. He rebuilt the roof of the church and since the church lacked a sacristy, he built a sacristy here by dismantling one that existed in the seminary chapel near the Kaduthuruthy Thazhath church. He installed a strong roof laid with clay tiles. Later, during a festival held at the church, the sacristy was damaged by fireworks and was later repaired. In 1929, during excavations conducted at the church by parish vicar Yawsep Puthuva, an old foundation made of stone was discovered inside the church beneath the existing foundation. This makes it clear that when Mathu Tharakan rebuilt the church in the 18th century, it was built on a larger scale.

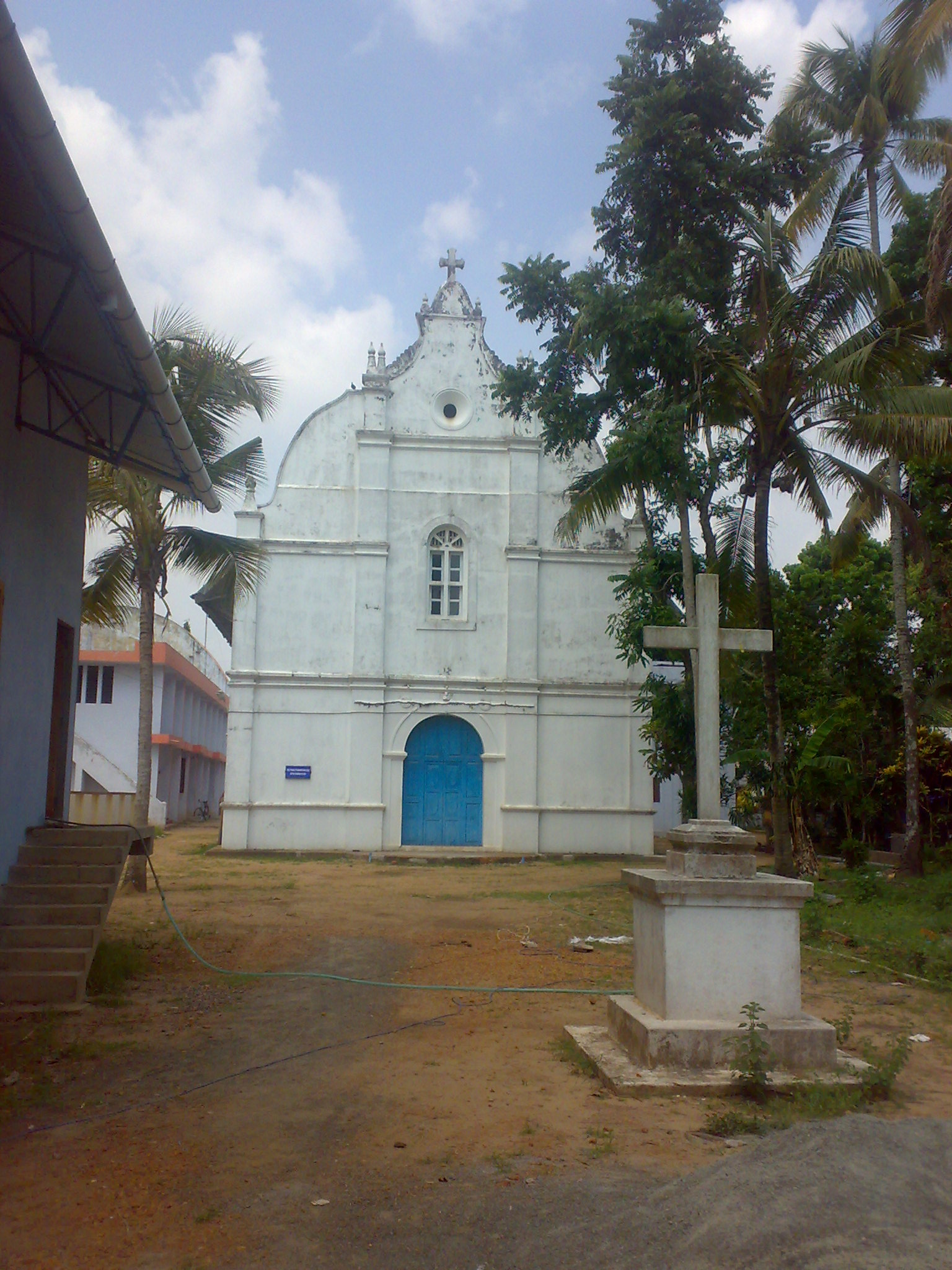
Old church before 2023 renovation

The wall on the east side of the church and the cemetery on the north side were built with stones excavated from the premises of the church in 1914. In 1906, the roof of this church was renovated and the old small tiles and wooden planks were replaced and the currently existing tiles were installed. In 1932, an additional door was built by drilling into the eastern side of the southern wall of the church. The waterway on the west side of the church had already fallen into disuse and the new way to the church was on the eastern side at the road side. This not only facilitated people's access inside the church, but also allowed more natural light to enter. In 1929, the floor of the sanctuary (Madbaha) and the eastern end of the nave were paved with bricks (terracota tiles). It was during this time that the gateway was built on the eastern side outside the church. In 1932, the floor of the sacristy was also paved with terracota tiles and railing was installed in front of the sanctuary.

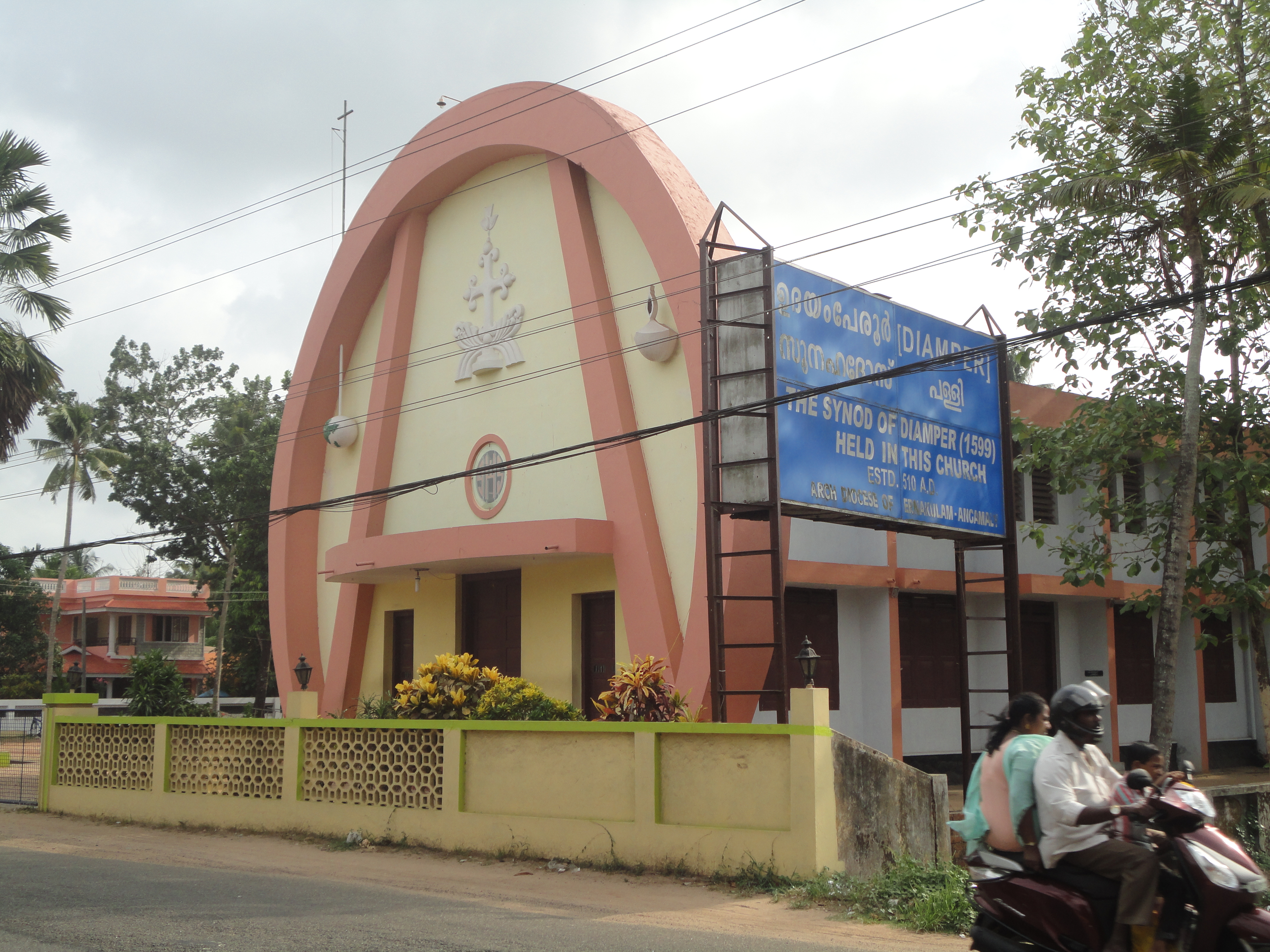
Udayamperoor new church

Until a new church was built on the site in 1983, the parish's worship services were held entirely in the old church. Following the consecration of the new church, the old church was declared a museum. In 2016, an annex was built adjacent to the old church with a façade on the eastern side facing the road. The old church and the annex houses the Synod of Diamper museum. In 2023, the old church underwent extensive refurbishment and beautification. Portuguese-style raredos were added to the sanctuary and better illumination system was installed. The roof was renovated and the annex was rebuilt.

The church also houses many historical artefacts including a golden chalice with bells, liturgical vestments and numerous statues and sculptures. These were moved to a safe location during Tipu's war and was later brought back. It is said that many documents were lost during this transfer.

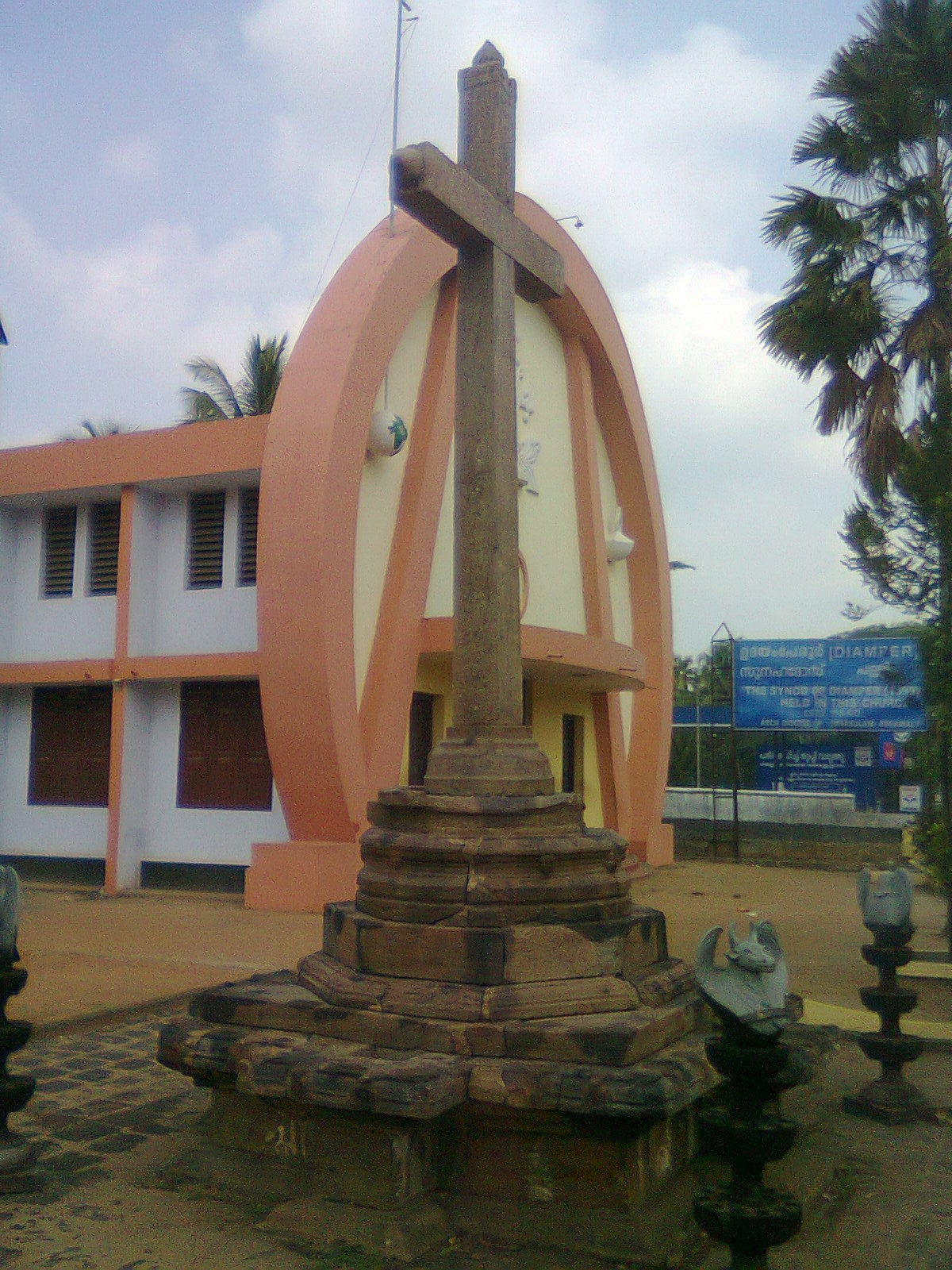
Open air granite cross of the Udayamperoor old church

== Dedication ==
Udayamperoor old church is dedicated to Gervasis and Protasis, the twin Italian saints whom the Portuguese missionaries introduced in Malabar inorder to replace Sabor and Aphroth, the local saints of the Saint Thomas Christians whom the Portuguese accused of Nestorianism.

In earlier documents, the dedication of the church is variable. In Malayalam documents that were published immediately after the Synod of Udayamperoor, the Church is called 'Maṟtha Maṟiam Paḷḷi' (Saint Mary's Church). Meanwhile, in most Portuguese accounts the church is said to be named after 'All Saints'. However in the book Jornada of Alexis Menezes published in 1606, the church in Udayamperoor is said to be dedicated to Marxabro and Marprodh (Sabor and Aphroth). The synod in its session IX decree 25 says that all the churches in Malabar dedicated to Sabor and Aphroth should be rededicated to 'All Saints'.

In later documents, the church appears either as 'All Saints church' or 'Gervasis and Protasis church'. Writers such as Raulin, Anquetil du Perron, and Paulinus have used the latter name for the church in their lists of Saint Thomas Christian churches. Meanwhile church documents and the calendars published by the Archeparchy of Ernakulam-Angamaly consistently list the church as 'All Saints' church up until 1951, when the name 'Sts. Gervasis and Protasis' officially replaced the title 'All Saints'.

The dedication to Gervasis and Protasis had already become popular among the churches in Malabar in early-17th century. The change brought forward by Alexis Menezes in the dedication of the Syro-Malabar churches named after Sabor and Aphroth to 'All Saints' failed to gain popularity. It was quickly replaced by Gervasis and Protasis inorder to resemble Sabor and Aphroth. However in the church of Udayamperoor this second rededication was implemented only by the 20th century.
