= Villarvattom =

Putative Christian dynasty in India

Villarvattom was the putative Christian dynasty in Kerala. It ostensibly existed until the middle of 15th century AD. Thoma of Villarvattom was apparently one of its last kings.

Saint Thomas Christians (also known as Syriac Christians) is a prosperous and politically powerful religious community in Kerala. They claim high-caste status by claiming to be descendants of Brahmans (Namboothiris) that converted to Christianity in 52 AD.

== Narratives ==
The oldest known record discussing Villarvattom is from 1606, when Antonio de Gouvea (who personally did not visit Kerala) wrote that in return for favors provided to other rulers, Syriac Christians were allowed to elect a king of their own, independent from the rulers of the region these Christians resided in. As the last king of the dynasty had no issue, his kingdom was inherited first by the king of Diamper and later passed on to the Cochin Royal Family. These claims were repeated by Claudius Buchanan, Charles Swanston, and Hermann Gundert, followed by L. K. Ananthakrishna Iyer , thus becoming reputable. T. K. Joseph of Travancore dated this dynasty back to the time of Thomas of Cana.

M.O. Joseph Nedumkantam recorded the legend that the last king of the dynasty, named Thomas, adopted a local prince Rama Varma who converted to Christianity, taking the name Immanuel, and married Thomas's daughter Mariam (also called Kripavathy). Immanuel's uncle was a ruler of Cochin and took offense to this union and eventually conquered Villarvattom. The Prince was either exiled or had to flee to Ceylon. Sorely grieved at this, Mariam died shortly alterwards. And with her death the ancient kingdom ceased to exist. C.V. Cherian records the founding of the dynasty by Thomas of Cana, and then repeats the legend of Immanuel, citing an inscription that dates the death of the last king by 1450 AD.

Robert Eric Frykenberg suggests that Villarvattom survived until the appearance of the Portuguese explorers in 1498. P.A.S. Mohammed, George Vargheese, Joseph Cheeran, and Velayudhan Panickassery provide similar narratives.

Knanaya traditions provide other narratives as well. They detail how the first King of Villarvattom was, Baliartes, called King of the Christians of St Thomas, who reigned in Malabar. They reference a certain Villarvatiom Pana which detailed how the Kingdom extended from the coastal islands of Chennamangalam, Maliankara and others to Udayamperoor. Originally the capital of the Kingdom was at Mahadeverpattanam in the island of Chennamangalam and later it was shifted to Udayamperoor. The Udayamperoor church, according to tradition, was built by the Raja of Villiarvation in A.D, 510. One of the inscriptions in the church mentions one Raja Mathulla (A. D. 900) and another speaks about one Raja Thoma. Traditions hold that Pope John XXIl addressed himself in 1330 to one of the successors of this Raja Thoma. Similarly it is claimed that in 1439 Pope Eugenius IV sent envoys to one King Thomas with a letter which commenced as follows;

"To my most beloved son in Christ, Thomas, the lustrious Emperor of the Indians, health and apostolic benediction. There often has reached us a constant rumour that your serenity and all who are subjects of your kingdom are true Christians."

It is widely believed that the sceptre of the Villiarvattom kings, a red rod tipped with silver having three small bells at the upper end, was presented by local Christians of Cochin to Vasco da Gama during his arrival to Kerala.

== Sources ==
- Sreekumar, P.K.; Eldhose, A.Y. (2024-05-03). "Text and Tradition: The Dynasty of Villarvattom among Syrian Christians in Kerala, India". South Asia: Journal of South Asian Studies. 47 (3): 634–655. doi:10.1080/00856401.2024.2350890. ISSN 0085-6401.
