= Kottakkavu Mar Thoma Syro-Malabar Church, North Paravur =

St.Thomas Kottakkavu Forane Church & Pilgrim Centre
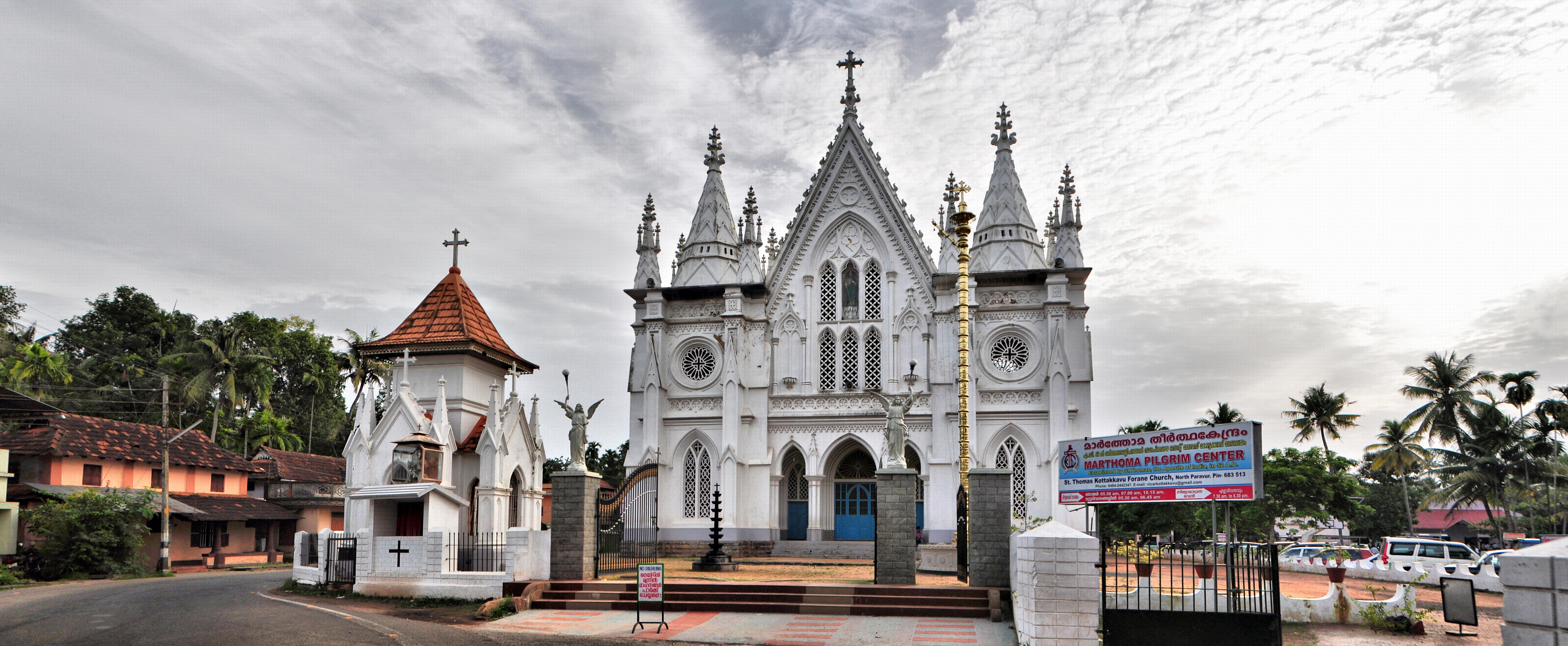
- Kottakkavu Forane Church & Pilgrim Centre, North Paravur
- St.Thomas Kottakkavu Forane Church & Pilgrim Centre
- Location: North Paravur
- Country: India
- Denomination: Syro-Malabar Church

History
- Former name(s): Kottakkavu Kandīshāppally (Sts. Sabor and Aproth Church) - until Synod of Diamper; Saints Gervasius and Protasius Church
- Founded: 52
- Founder: St. Thomas the Apostle
- Dedication: St. Thomas

Architecture
- Functional status: Active

Administration
- District: Ernakulam
- Diocese: Syro-Malabar Catholic Major Archeparchy of Ernakulam-Angamaly

Clergy
- Archbishop: Mar Raphael Thattil (വലിയ മെത്രാപ്പോലീത്താ)
- Bishop: Mar Bosco Puthoor(Apostolic Administrator)
- Vicar: Jose പുതിയേടത്ത്

Kottakkavu Mar Thoma Syro-Malabar Pilgrim Church is a Syro-Malabar church located in North Paravur. According to Saint Thomas Christian tradition, the church was established in 52 AD by St. Thomas (Mar Thoma shleeha), one of the twelve apostles of Jesus Christ. It is one of the first churches in India and is called an Apostolic Church credited to the Apostolate of St. Thomas who preached and also started the conversion of people to Syriac Christianity here. It is one of the Ezharappallikal (seven and Ara ( Ara In malayalam Royal) churches - Total 8 Churches) that he established in India; the other Seven churches were established at Kodungalloor, Kokkamangalam, Palayoor, Kollam, Niranam, Thiruvithamcode and Nilackal.

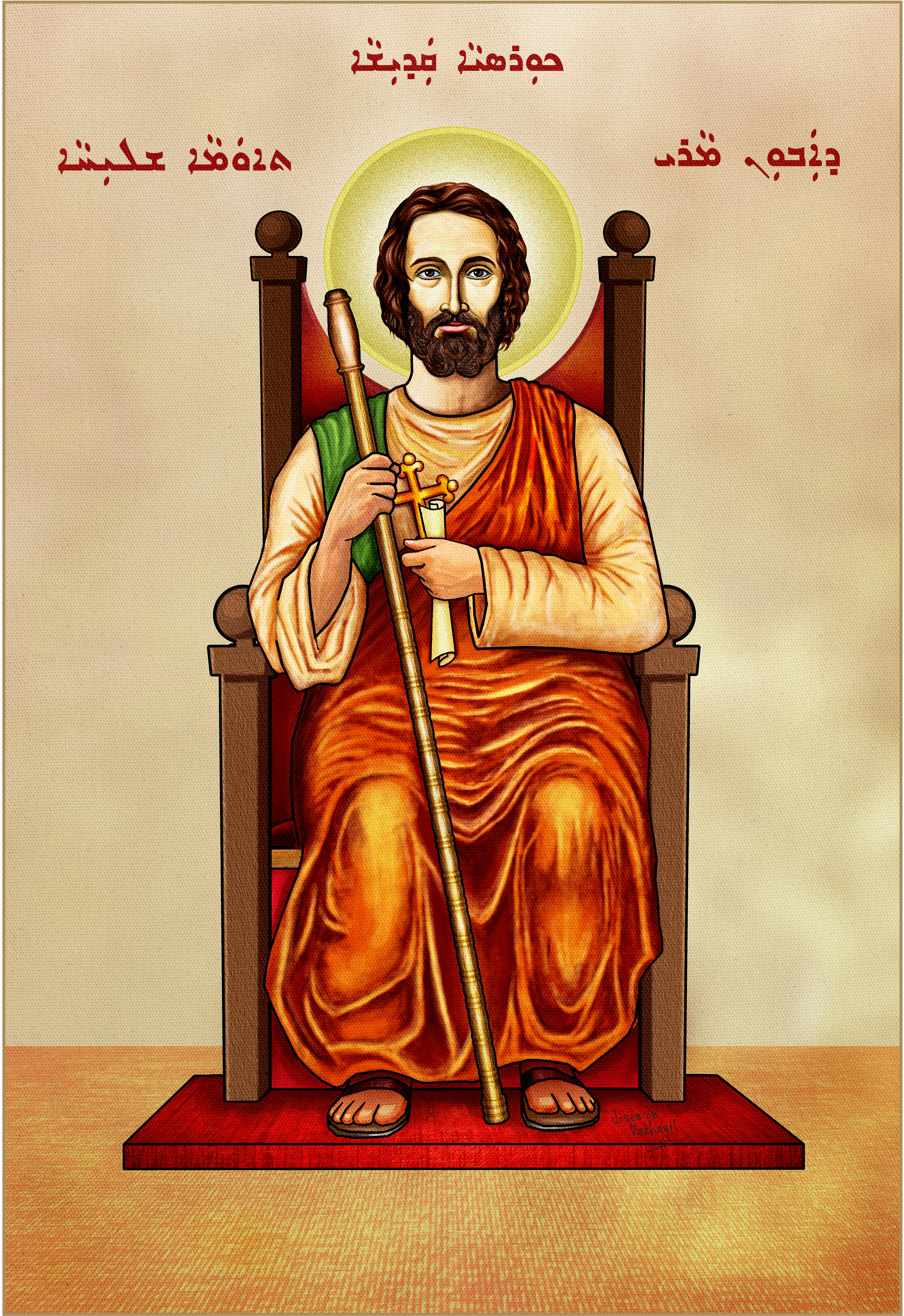
Saint Thomas the Apostle

== History ==
Ramban Pattu

The Saint reached Kottakkayal

Where he taught the Holy Way

There within a span of a year

One thousand seven hundred

And another seventy of them

Were christened by baptism

=== Mar Sabor and Mar Proth ===
Mar Sabor and Mar Proth came from Persia to Malankara in the 9th century. They built and presided over a number of churches in Malankara operating in accordance with Saint Thomas Christians. The second church of Kottakkavu was rebuilt at this time. After their death they were remembered as saints and their name was given to this church. Kottakkavu Sliva, a Persian cross engraved on granite stone by Mar Sabor and Mar Proth, is preserved in the chapel in front of the church.

MS Vatican Syriac N. iv., dated A.D. 1556, and has the following colophon in folio 278:

"By the help of our Lord we have finished this book of the Prophets; it was written on a Monday, the 18th of February, in the year 1556 of the birth of our Lord. I, priest Jacob, the disciple of Mar Jacob, and from the village of Puraur, have written this book in the holy Church of Mar Shapur and Mar Iapot [Piruz]. May the holy name of God be praised for ever. Amen!"

=== Old church ===
The existing old church, the third church, was built in 1308. The ruined old church was again reconstructed in the 21st century.

== Gallery ==
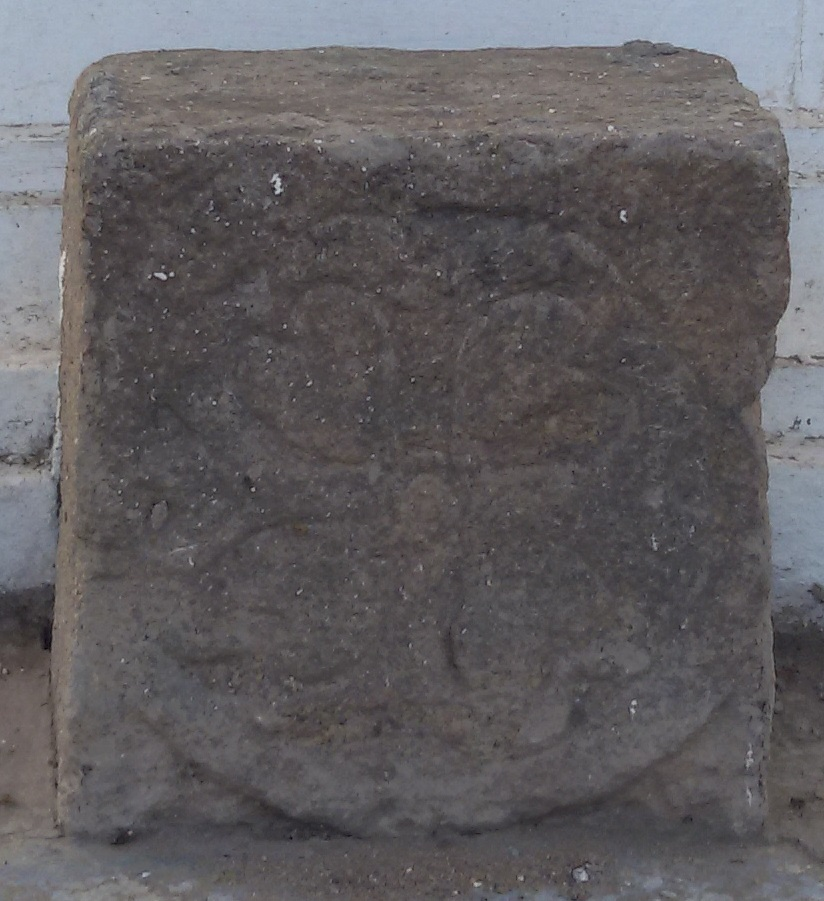
Kottakkavu Slīva, a Persian cross founded by Mar Sabor and Mar Proth, is preserved at Kottakkavu Mar Thoma Syro-Malabar Pilgrim Center

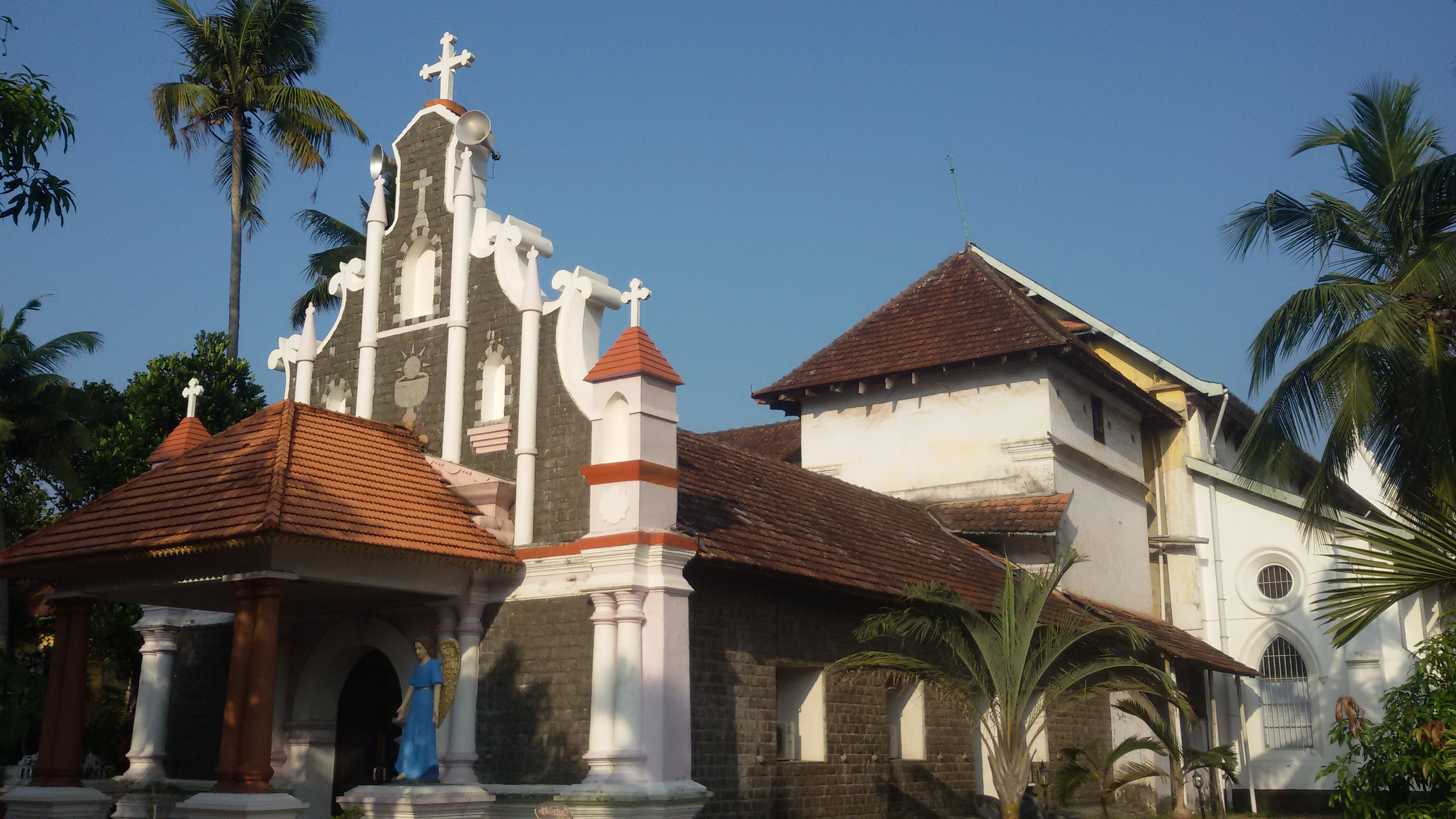
Kottakkavu Old Church

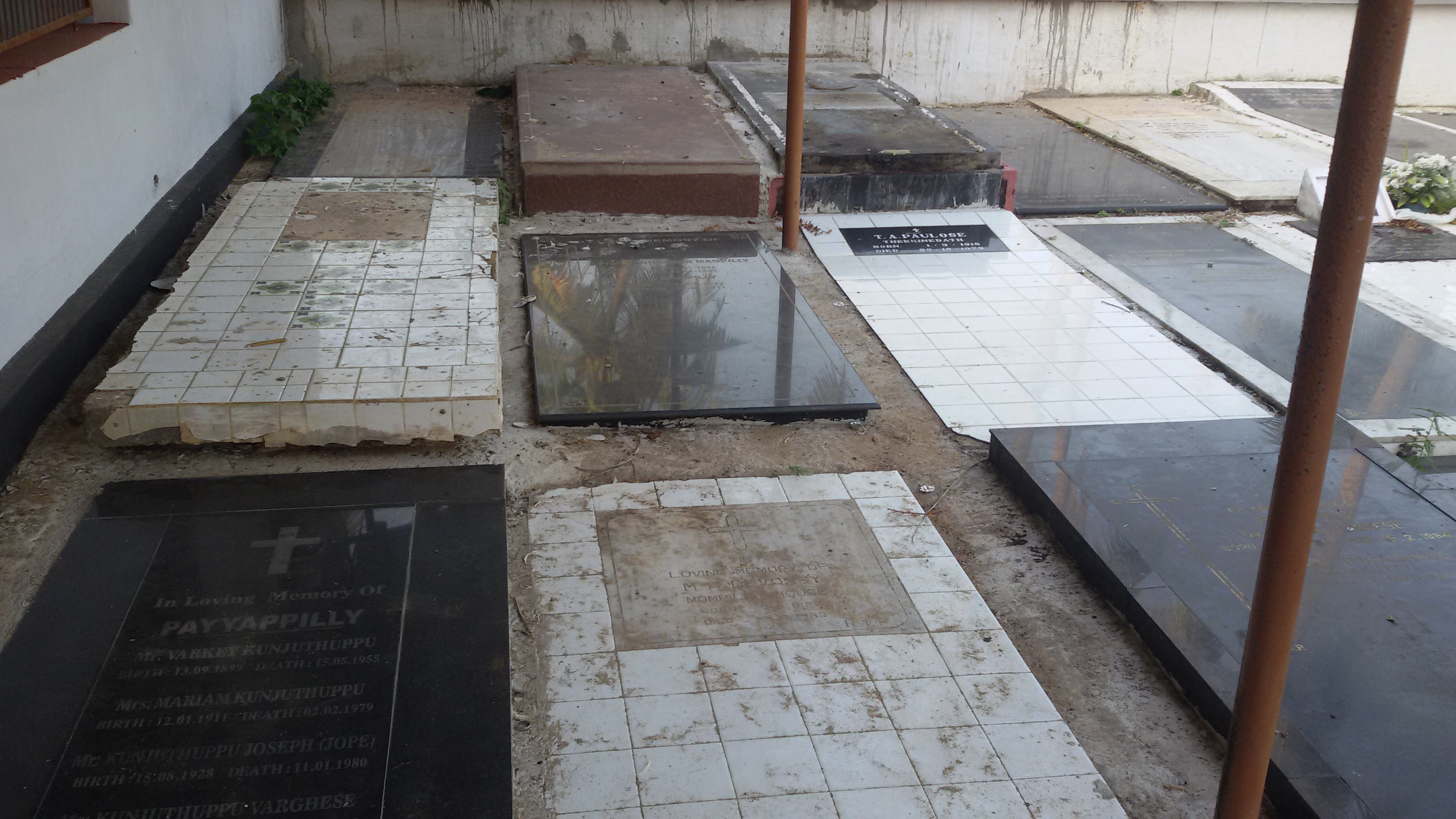
Cemetery of Kottakkavu Syro-Malabar Church

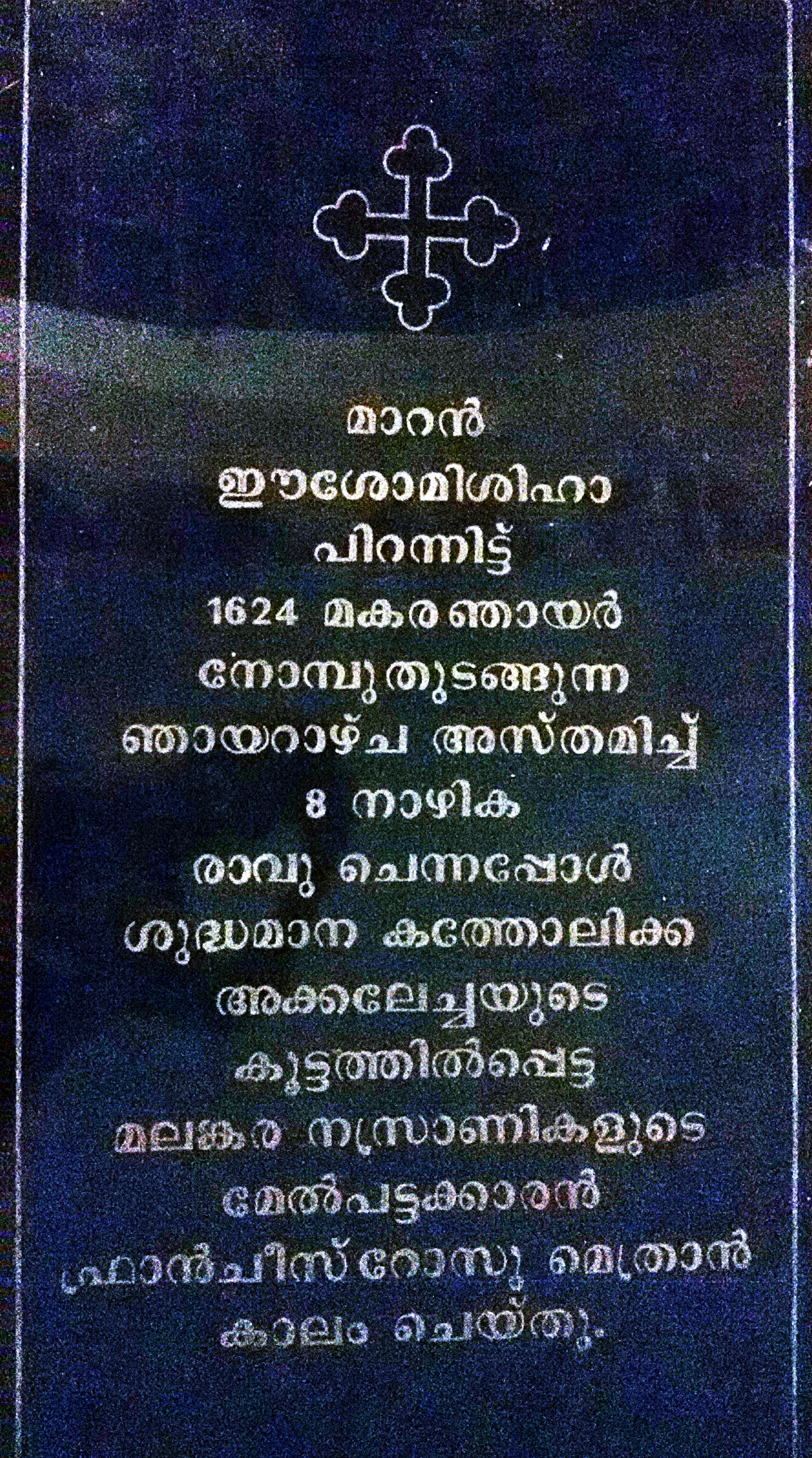
Tomb of Francis Roz, Metropolitan of Kodungalloor Archeparchy, inside Kottakkavu Old Church

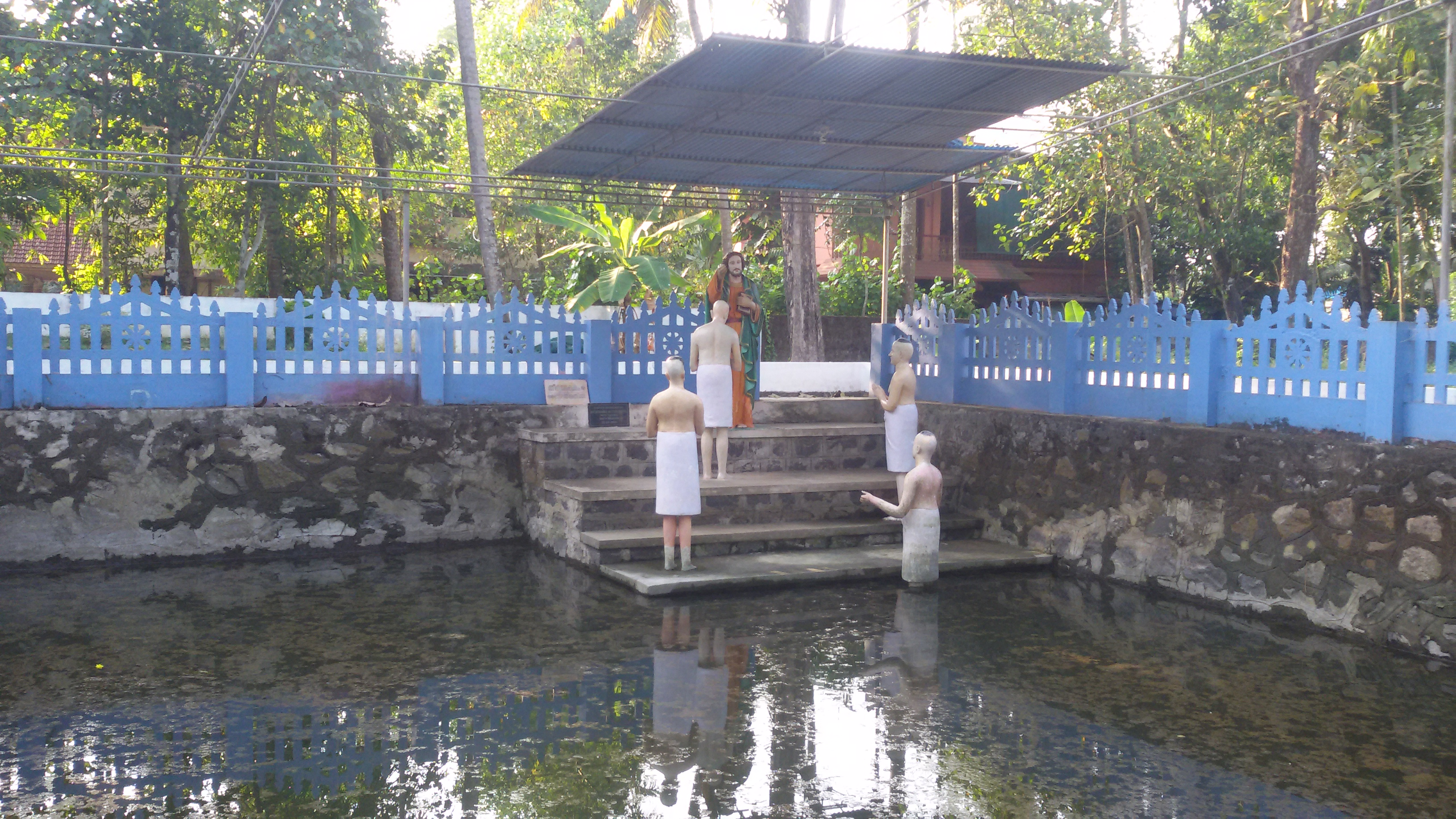
Kottakkavu Pond where St. Thomas baptized Jews

== Bibliography ==
- Menon, A. Sreedhara (1962). Kerala District Gazetteers: Trichur, Kerala, Volume 7. Superintendent of Govt. Presses.
- Rao, T. A. Gopinatha (1910). "Parur Inscription". Travancore Archaeological Series. I: 300–302.
