= San Gervasio =

San Gervasio may refer to:

- Italian and Spanish for Saint Gervasius
- San Gervasio (Capriate San Gervasio), a subdivision of Capriate San Gervasio, Italy
- Capriate San Gervasio, in the province of Bergamo, Italy
- Palazzo San Gervasio, in the province of Potenza, Italy
- San Gervasio Bresciano, in the province of Brescia, Italy
- San Gervasio (Maya site), an archaeological site of the Maya civilization, located on the island of Cozumel, Mexico
