= Mar Sabor and Mar Proth =

9th-century Syriac Christian bishops

Saints Mor Sabor and Mor Afroth Qandisangal
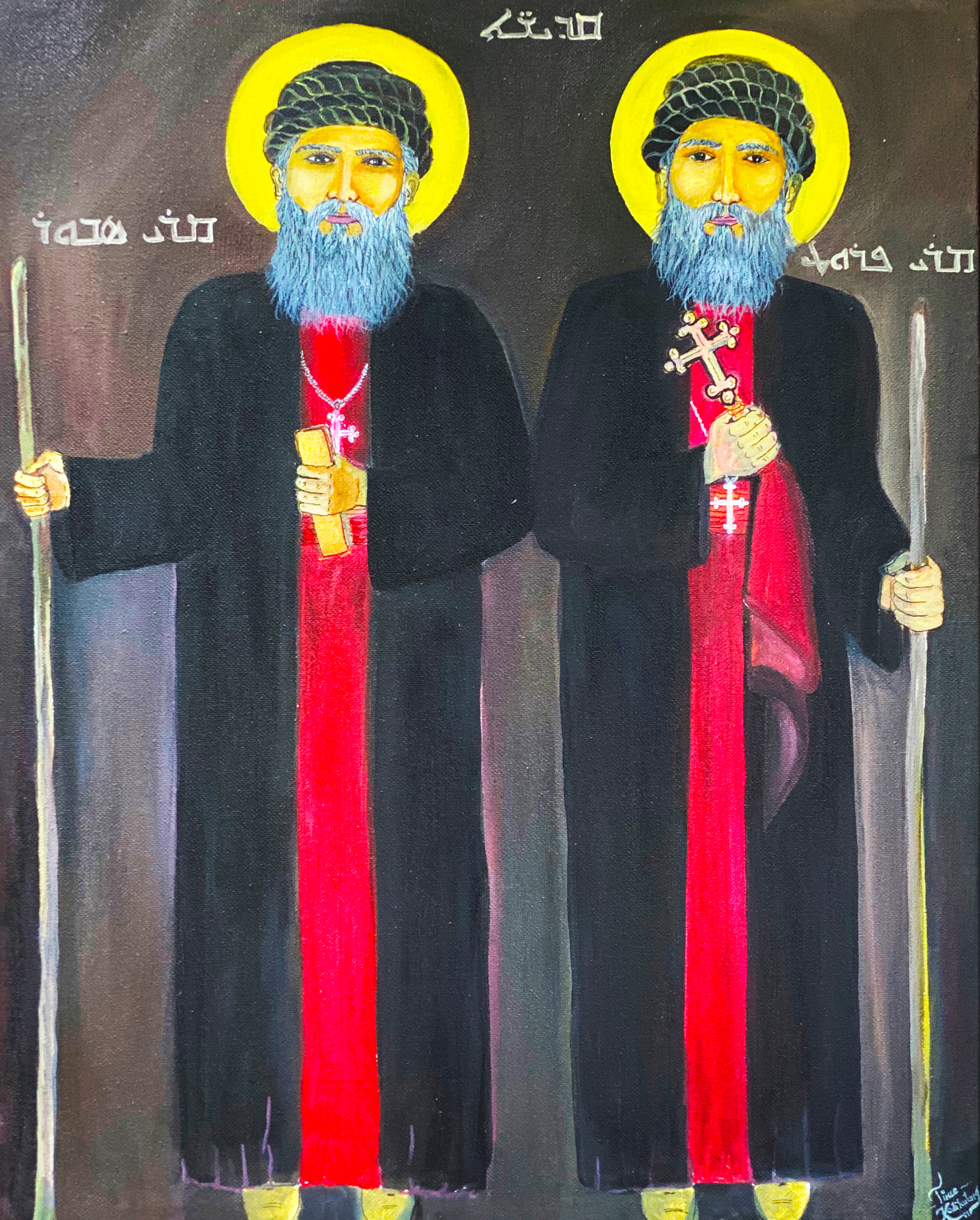
- Venerated in: Syriac Orthodox Church; Malankara Orthodox Church; Syro-Malabar Church
- Feast: April 29
- Influenced: Saint Thomas Christians

Mar Sabor and Mar Afroth, according to Syrian Christians of Kerala, were two bishops from the Church of the East (often described in local memory as “Syrian bishops”) who are believed to have arrived around 825 AD along with a group of Christian settlers from Persia. Together, they established ecclesiastical institutions in several regions. Revered for their devoutness, they were posthumously recognized as saints by the local ecclesiastical body. The mission is said to have received permission from the then king of Kerala to build a church in Kollam.

That the historicity of this mission cannot be verified does not dispute the epigraphical evidence that Christians were on the Malabar Coast in 9th century AD. Kollam Syrian copper plates, a 9th-century royal grant from Kerala, mentions that certain Maruvan Sapir Iso built a church at Kollam with the blessing of the then Emperor of Kerala. It is likely that Mar Sapir had a companion named Mar Proth. A stone cross, one of the five Persian Crosses, with Sassanid Pahlavi inscription recovered also mentions certain "Afras the Syrian" as "the son of Chaharabukht".

Mor Sabor and Mor afroth, as bishops from the Church of the East, played a significant role in consolidating the East Syriac tradition among the Saint Thomas Christians of Kerala in the 9th century.The Quilon Copper Plate Grants (849 AD) issued to them by Chera ruler Ayyanadikal Thiruvadikal secured land, trade rights, and privileges for the Christian community, enabling it to flourish as a distinct socio-religious body in Kerala. Through their liturgical, institutional, and communal contributions, Mor Sabor and Mor afroth helped establish the foundations of Syriac Christianity in India, a legacy that continues in the Malankara Church

The two bishops are said to have died in Kerala and have been considered as saints by the Syro-Malabar Church, Jacobite Syriac Orthodox Church and Malankara Orthodox Syrian Church.

== Veneration ==
Sabor and Aproth were highly venerated in India among the Saint Thomas Christian community. A number of churches including Kottakkavu, Udayamperur, Kayamkulam, Kollam and Kothanallur, were dedicated to these saints.

MS Vatican Syriac N. iv., which is dated to 1556 and written in the Kottakkavu Church, has the following colophon in folio 278:

"By the help of our Lord we have finished this book of the Prophets; it was written on a Monday, the 18th of February, in the year 1556 of the birth of our Lord. I, priest Jacob, the disciple of Mar Jacob, and from the village of Puraur, have written this book in the holy Church of Mar Shapur and Mar Iapot [Aprot]. May the holy name of God be praised for ever. Amen!"

== Variations of the names ==
Mar is a Syriac term meaning '(My)Lord' usually prefixed for Saints and Bishops in the Syriac tradition.

- Mar Sapir (T. K. Joseph) - Sabor
- Mar Prot (Land) - Prodh (T. K. Joseph and Gouva)/Proth - Firous (La Croz) - Aphrottu (Burnell)/Aphroth - Ambrose (Swanston)

== Major studies ==
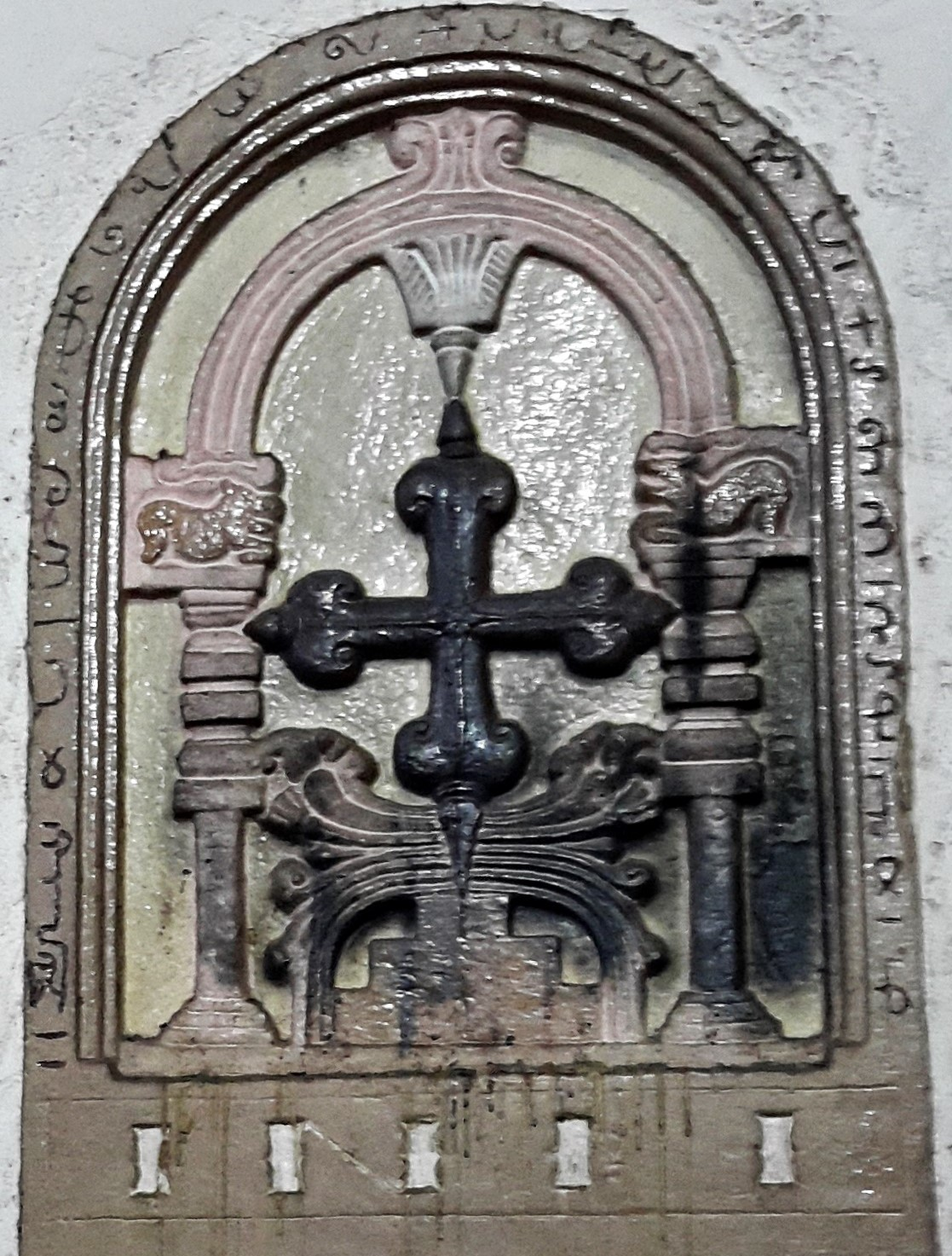
The Persian cross founded by Sabor and Proth at Kadamattom Church

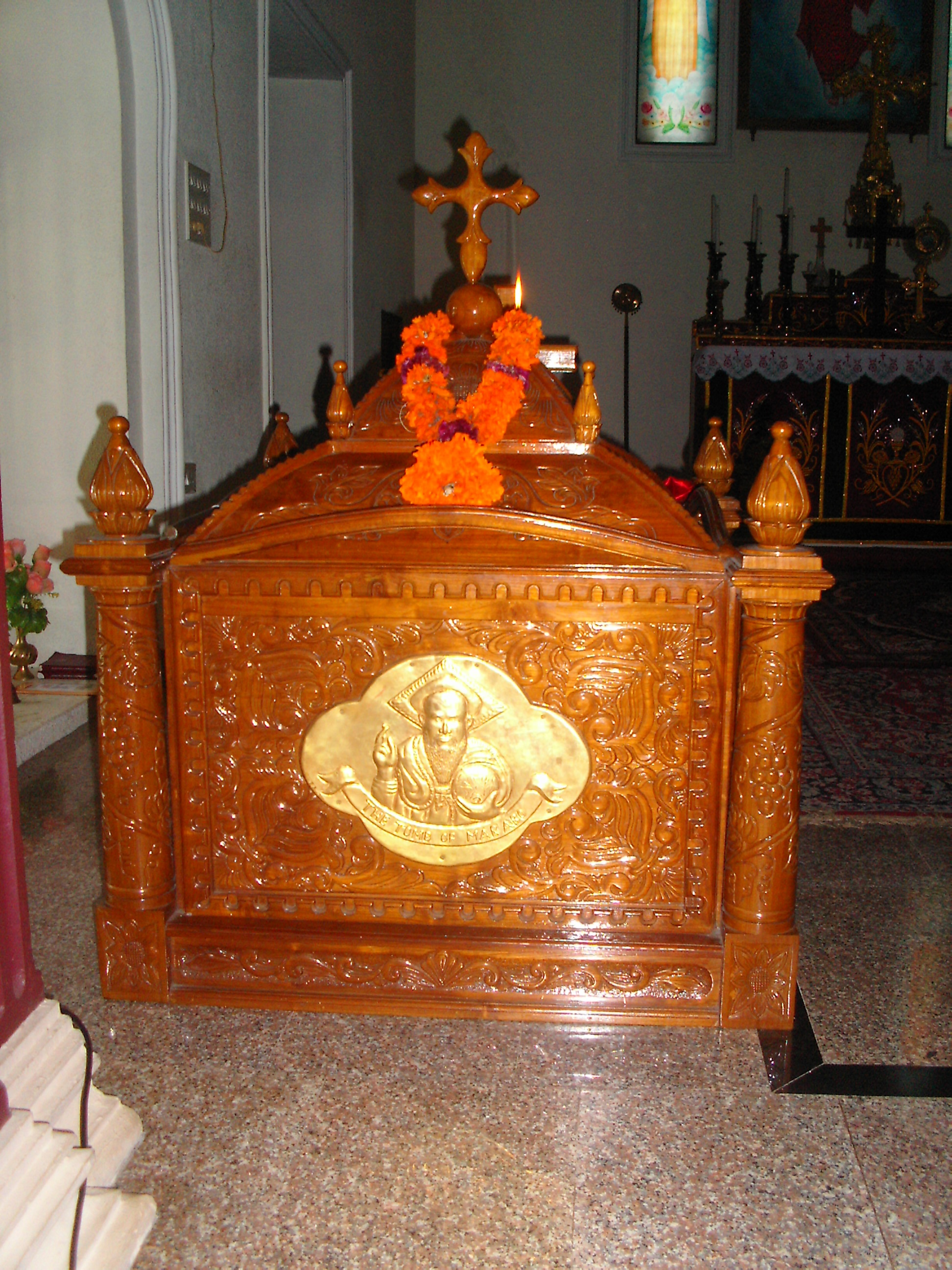
Tomb of Mar Abo (often identified as Mar Sabor among some Puthenkoor denominations) at Marthamariam church, Thevalakkara

=== Recent ===
- The Kollam Plates in the World of the Ninth Century Indian Ocean. Delhi: Primus Books (upcoming).
- M. R. Raghava Varier and K. Veluthat, 2013. Tarissāppaḷḷippaṭṭayam, Trivandrum: National Book Stall
- C. G. Cereti, 'The Pahlavi Signatures on the Quilon Copper Plates', in Exegisti Monument (Wiesbaden: Harrasowitz, 2009).
- C. G. Cereti, L. M. Olivieri, and J. Vazhuthanapally, 'The Problem of the Saint Thomas Crosses and Related Questions', East and West 52:1/ 4 (2002).
- M. G. S. Narayanan, Cultural Symbiosis in Kerala (Trivandrum: Kerala Historical Society, 1972).
- W. Baum and R. Senoner (eds. and trans.), Indien und Europa im Mittelalter: Die Eingliederung des Kontinents in das europäische Bewußtsein bis ins 15. Jahrhundert (Klagenfurt: Kitab, 2000).

=== Others ===
- Travancore Archaeological Series, Volume II, no. 9 (I and II).
- C. P . T. Winckworth, 'A New Interpretation of the Pahlavi Cross Inscriptions', Kerala Society Papers, no. 3.
- Land, 'Brief History of the Syrians of Malabar'. Anedocta Syriaca, I.
- Joseph, T. K., 'Mar Sapir and Mar Prodh', Indian Antiquary, 1928, III.
- A. Mingana, “The Early Spread of Christianity in India”, Bulletin of John Ryland's Library 10:2 (1926).
- W. Logan, Malabar Manual, (ed. P. Cherian (2000).
- A. C. Burnell, Indian Antiquary, III.
- Gundert, Madras Journal of Literature and Science, XIII, I.
- Rev. J. Monteiro D'Aguir, 'The Magna Carta of St. Thomas Christians', Kerala Society Papers, no. 4.

== Synod of Diamper ==
When they arrived on the Malabar Coast, the Portuguese noted at least 78 extant church communities closely interwoven with the local community in different parts of Kerala. Quilon, Angamaly, Kaduthuruthy and Cranganore (now known as Kodungallur) had the largest population of Saint Thomas Christians in Kerala. Giovanni Empoli, who came to Quilon in 1503, estimated that there were more than three thousand St. Thomas Christians in Quilon alone.

After 1561, Thomas Christians were branded heretics by the Goa Inquisition. The infamous Synod of Diamper (1599) anathematized all Christians of India who did not submit to Rome. The synod even branded Mar Sabor and Mar Prot as "Nestorian heretics" at the instance of the Portuguese.

== Notes ==
1. "Mar" (Syriac: "lord") is an episcopal title used in the Malabar churches and in West Asia, while "Sapor" (Syriac: Shapur) and "Prodh" (Syriac: Firuz) are alternative names used in the Sasanian Empire in the 4-5th centuries AD. A Christian grant made by the Kollam ruler dating to about 824 AD bears the name "Maruvan Sapir Iso", which is believed to be an amalgamation of "Mar Sapor" and "Mar Prodh" or simply the Syriac name Sabrisho, popular in the Church of the East.
