= Udayamperoor =

Udayamperoor Udayamperoor
- Town
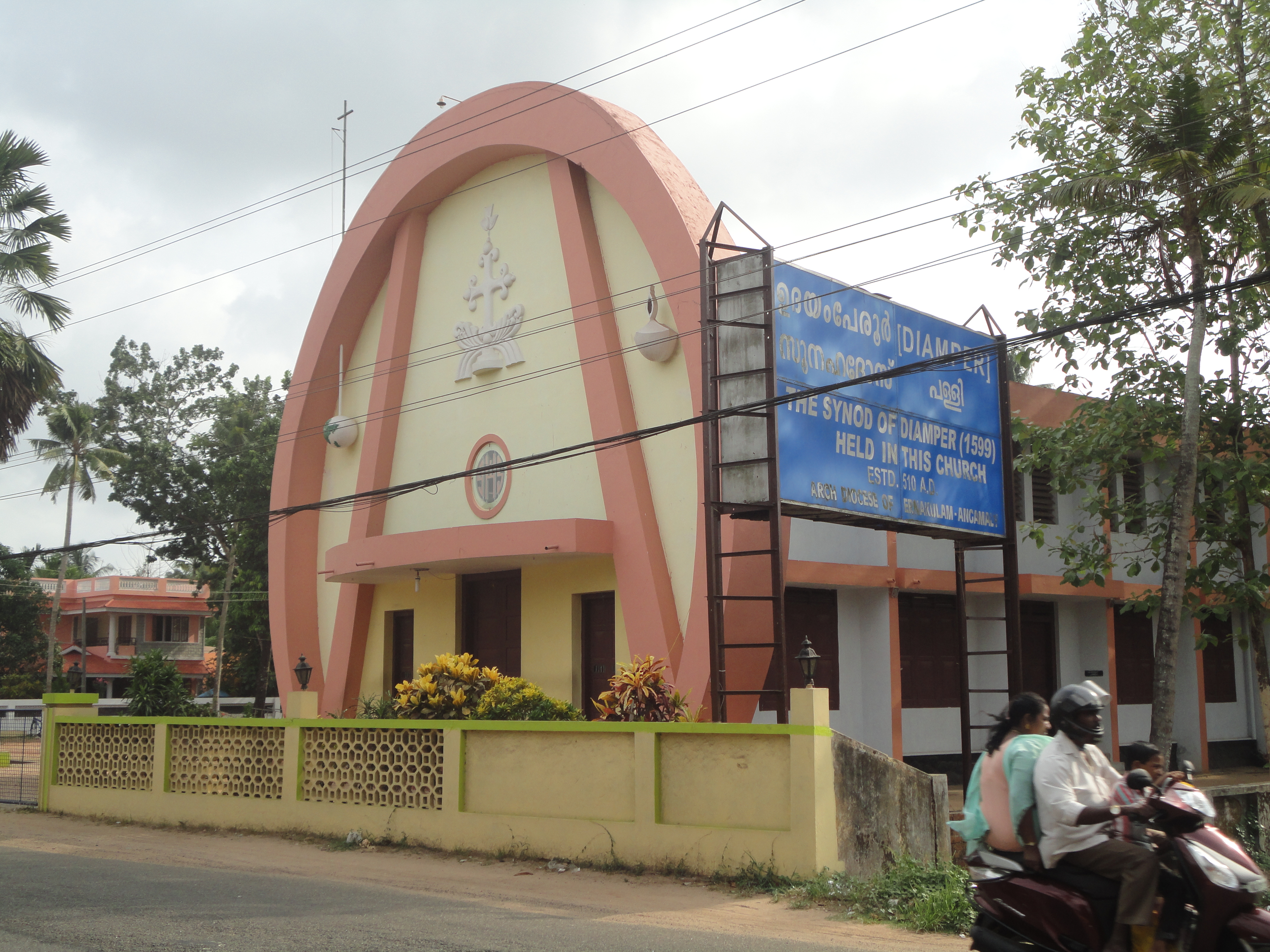
- Interactive map of Udayamperoor
- Postal code: 682307

Udayamperoor is a town situated in Ernakulam district, Kerala, in India. It is among the islands located in the Kochi Lake, also known as Vembanad Lake.

== Geography ==
It is located at 9°54′50″N 76°21′48″E.

== See also ==
- Synod of Diamper
- Thoma of Villarvattom
