= Sabrisho =

Sabrisho or Sabrishoʿ may refer to:

- Sabrisho I, patriarch of the Church of the East (596–604)
- Sabrisho II, patriarch of the Church of the East (831–835)
- Sabrisho III, patriarch of the Church of the East (1064–1072)
- Sabrisho IV, patriarch of the Church of the East (1222–1224)
- Sabrisho V, patriarch of the Church of the East (1226–1256)
