= Thoma of Villarvattom =

Feudal monarch of Villarvattom

Raja Thoma of Villarvattom (Thomas in English) was the name of the feudal monarch of Villarvattom, a vassal fiefdom of the Kingdom of Cochin.

Throughout the history of the Villarvattom dynasty, there were multiple kings who took the regnal name Thoma. The last king of the dynasty also called Thoma, adopted a local prince, Rama Varma, who converted to Christianity, taking the name Immanuel, and married Thoma's daughter Mariam (also called Kripavathy). Immanuel's uncle was a ruler of Cochin and took offense to this union and eventually conquered Villarvattom. The prince was either exiled or had to flee to Ceylon. Sorely grieved at this, Mariam died shortly afterwards. And with her death, the ancient kingdom ceased to exist. C.V. Cherian, cites an inscription that dates the death of Thoma to 1450 AD.

== See also ==
- Pakalomattam family
- Villarvattom
