= Gervasius and Protasius =

Christian saints and martyrs

Saints Gervasius and Protasius
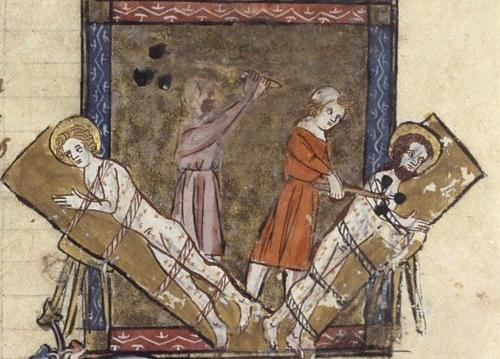
- "The martyrdom of Saints Gervase and Protase," from a 14th-century manuscript.

Martyrs
- Born: Milan
- Died: 2nd century AD; Milan
- Venerated in: Roman Catholic Church; Eastern Orthodox Church
- Major shrine: Basilica Sant'Ambrogio, Milan, Italy
- Feast: 19 June (Catholic Church); 14 October (Eastern Orthodox Church)
- Attributes: the scourge, the club and the sword
- Patronage: Milan; Breisach; haymakers; invoked for the discovery of thieves

Gervasius and Protasius (also Gervase and Protase, Gervasis and Prothasis and in French Gervais and Protais) are venerated as Christian martyrs, probably of the 2nd century. They are the patron saints of Milan and of haymakers and are invoked for the discovery of thieves. Their feast day in the Latin Rite of the Catholic Church is 19 June, the day marking the translation of their relics. In the Eastern Orthodox Church and in the Eastern Rites of the Catholic Church, their feast takes place on 14 October (O.S.)/24 October (N.S.), the traditional day of their death. In Christian iconography their emblems are the scourge, the club and the sword.

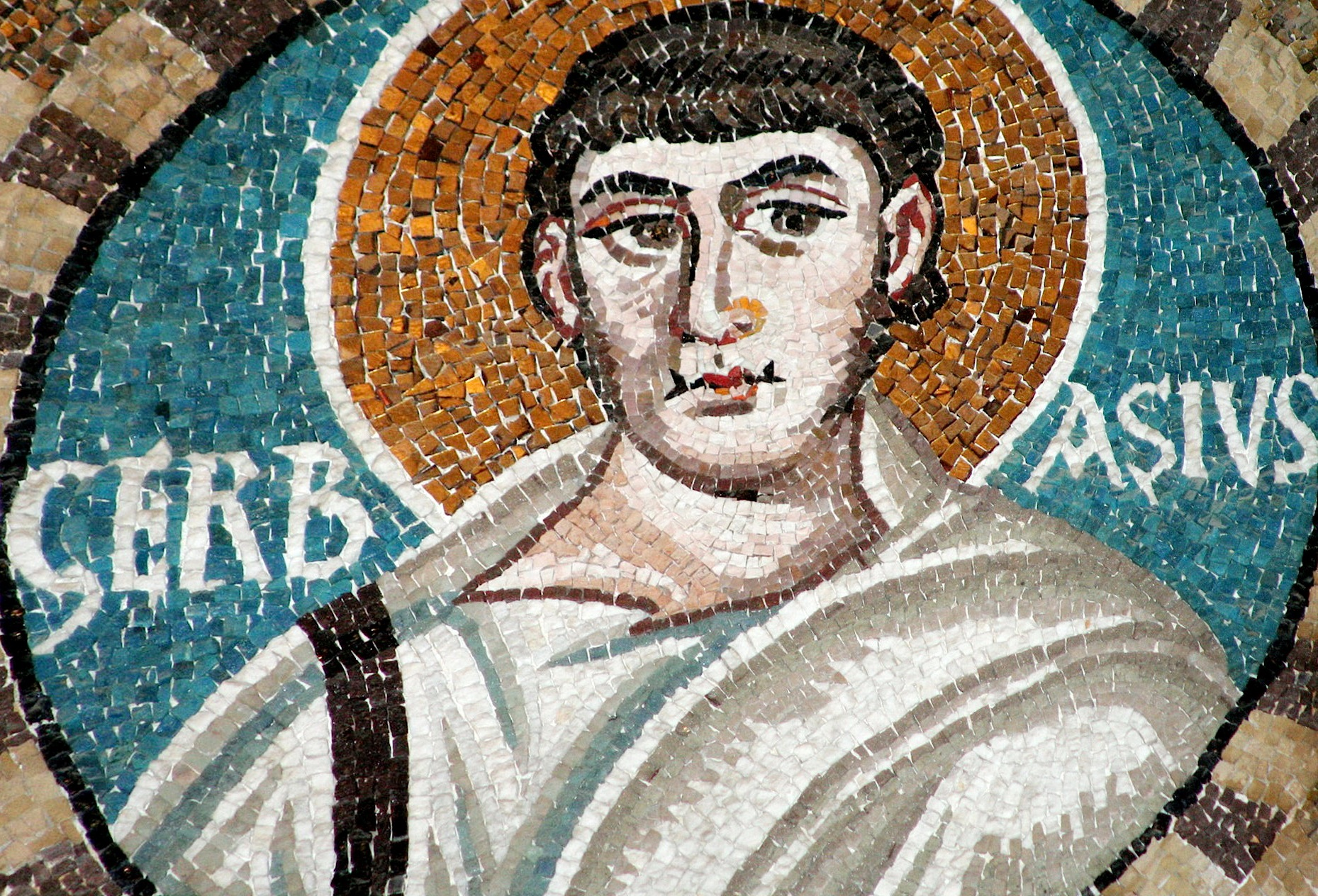
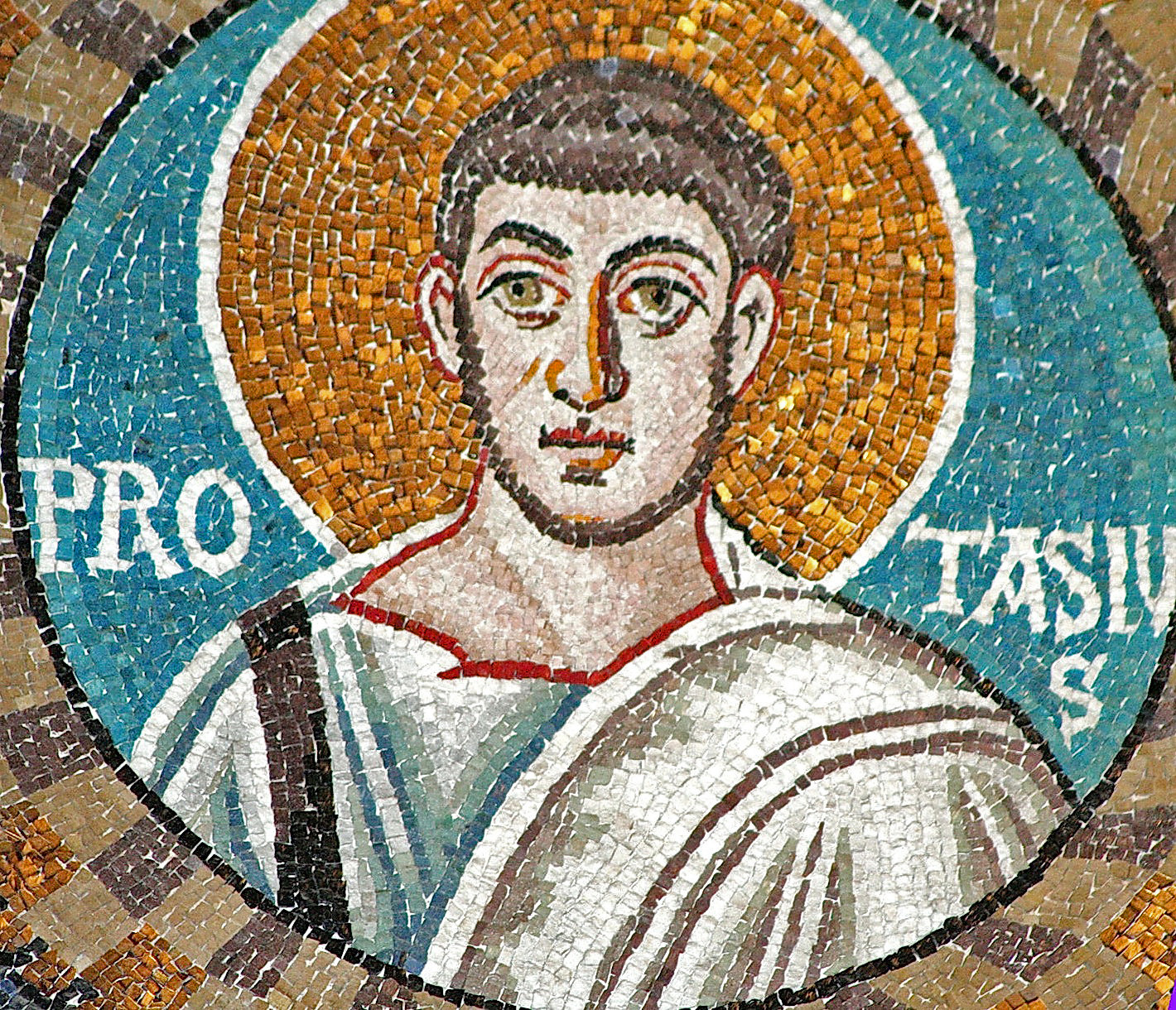
Gervasius and Protasius, details of the mosaics in the Basilica of San Vitale, Ravenna, 6th century

== Martyrdom ==
The acta may have been expanded from a letter (Epistle liii) to the bishops of Italy, falsely ascribed to Ambrose. They are written in a very simple style; it has not been possible to establish the date of their composition. According to these, Gervasius and Protasius were the twin sons of martyrs. Their father, Vitalis of Milan, a man of consular dignity, suffered martyrdom at Ravenna, possibly under Nero. Their mother, Valeria, died for her faith in Milan. Gervasius and Protasius were imprisoned, and visited in prison by Nazarius.

The sons are said to have had large hands and had been scourged and then beheaded, during the reign of the Emperor Nero, under the presidency of Anubinus or Astasius, and while Caius was Bishop of Milan. Some authors place the martyrdom under the Emperor Diocletian, but others object to this time because it is not clear how, in that case, the place of burial, and even the names, could be forgotten by the time of Ambrose, as is stated. It probably occurred during the reign of Emperor Marcus Aurelius (161–180).

== Ambrose and Gervasius and Protasius ==
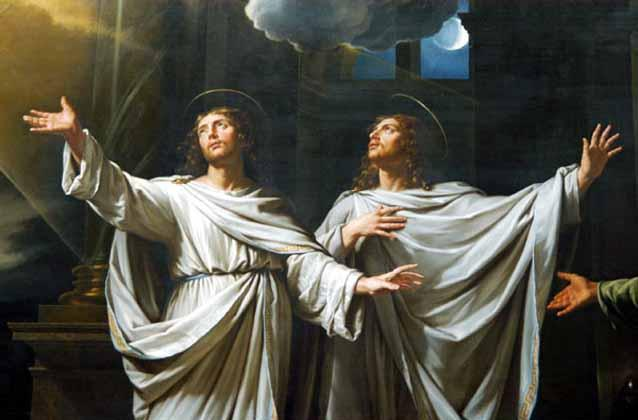
Gervasius and Protasius, by Philippe de Champaigne

Ambrose, in 386, had built a magnificent basilica at Milan, now called the Basilica Sant'Ambrogio. Asked by the people to consecrate it in the same solemn manner as was done in Rome, he promised to do so if he could obtain the necessary relics. In a dream, he was shown the place where such relics could be found. He ordered excavations to be made outside the city, in the cemetery Church of Saints Nabor and Felix, who were at the time the primary patrons of Milan, and there found the relics of Saints Gervasius and Protasius. In a letter, Ambrose wrote: "I found the fitting signs, and on bringing in some on whom hands were to be laid, the power of the holy martyrs became so manifest, that even whilst I was still silent, one was seized and thrown prostrate at the holy burial-place. We found two men of marvelous stature, such as those of ancient days. All the bones were perfect, and there was much blood."

Ambrose had their relics removed to the Basilica of Fausta (now the Church of Saints Vitalis and Agricola), and on the next day into the basilica, accompanied in the texts by many miracles, emblematic of divine favor in the context of the great struggle then taking place between Ambrose and the Arian Empress Justina. Of the vision, the subsequent discovery of the relics and the accompanying miracles, Ambrose wrote to his sister Marcellina.

Augustine, not yet baptized, claims to have witnessed these events and relates them in his "Confessions" (IX, vii), and in "De Civitate Dei" (XXII, viii) as well as in his "Sermon 286 in natal. Ss. Mm. Gerv. et Prot.". They are also alleged by Paulinus in his life of Ambrose. The latter died in 397 and by his own wish was buried in his basilica by the side of these martyrs. It has been suggested that the Brescia Casket was made for or used to hold the relics.

== Veneration ==
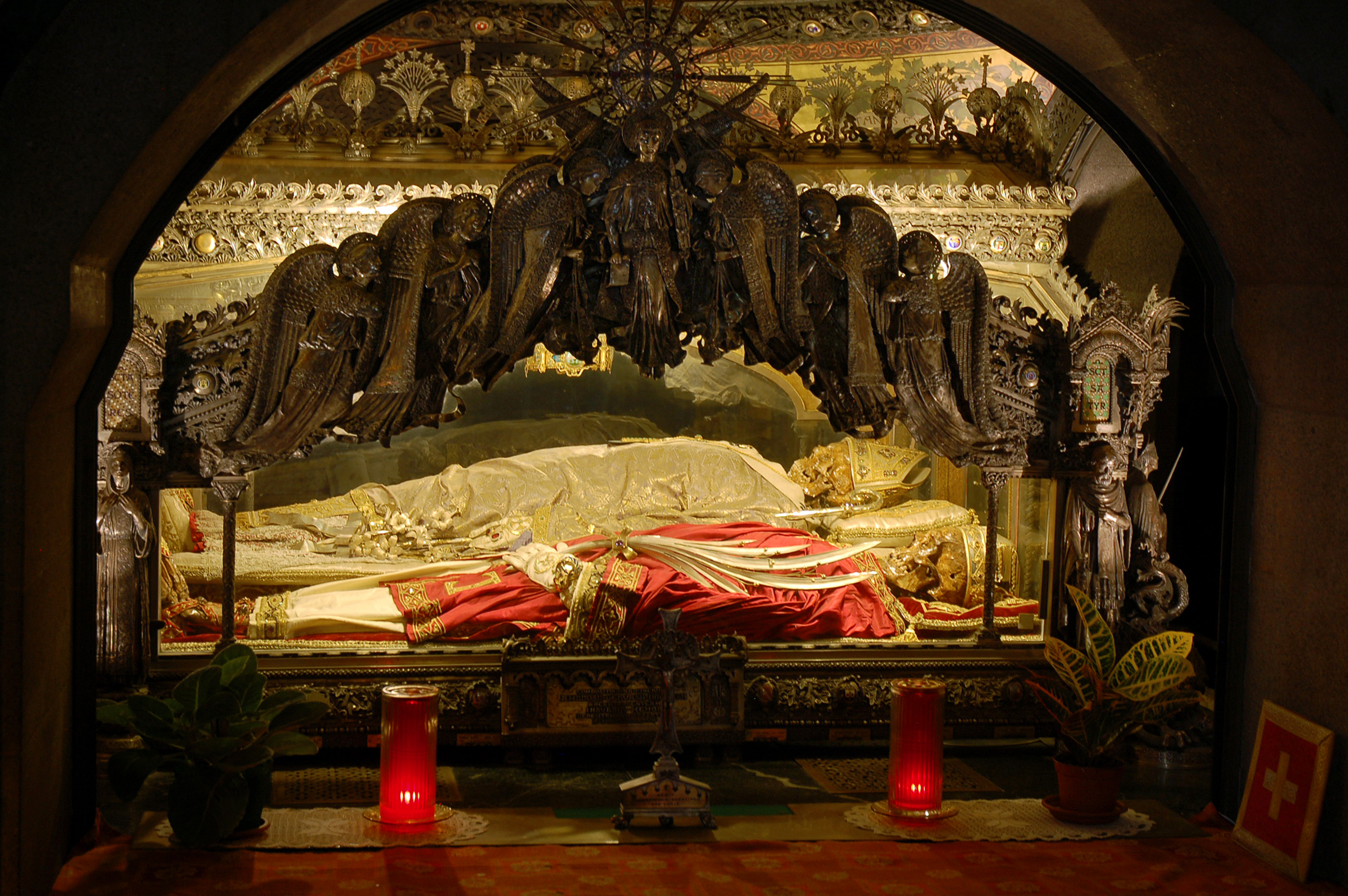
The crypt in Sant'Ambrogio basilica. Embossed silver urn, displaying the skeletons of Saints Ambrose, Gervase, and Protase.

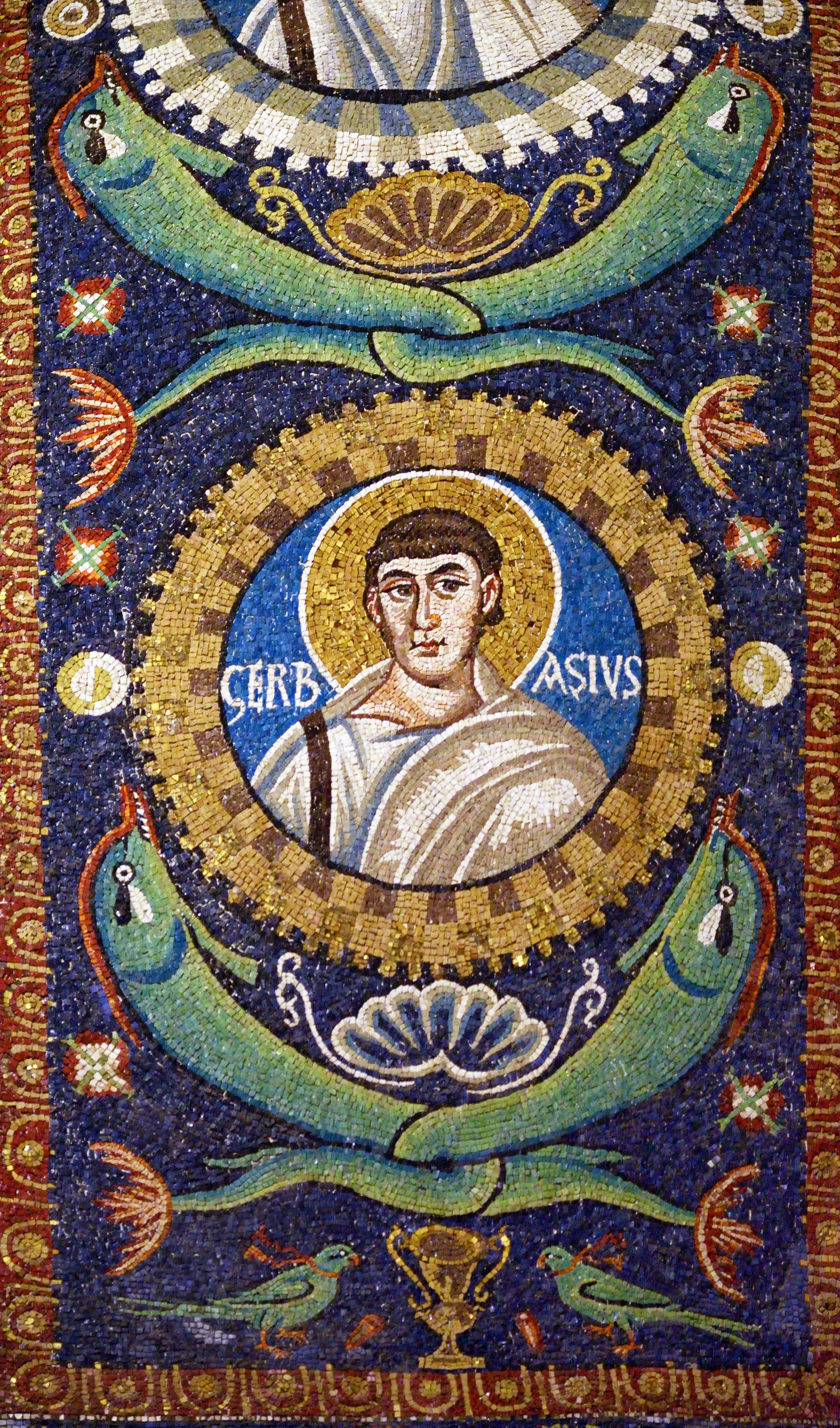
Martyr Gervasius. Mosaic in the Basilica of San Vitale, Ravenna

J. Rendel Harris, in "The Dioscuri in the Christian Legends" (London, 1903), addressed the subject of twin saints in Christian legend, who seem to be connected with the Dioscuri, whose cult was tenacious, surmised from an oration decrying their veneration by Dio Chrysostom ("Orations" 61.11). The historicity of Gervasius and Protasius was defended in the "Analecta Bollandist." (1904), XXIII, 427.

Immediately after the discovery of the relics by Ambrose, the cult of Saints Gervasius and Protasius was spread in Italy, churches were built in their honour at Pavia, Nola and other places. In Gaul (modern-day France), Around the year 400 churches were dedicated to them, at Mans, Rouen and Soissons. At the Louvre in Paris, there is now a famous picture of the saints by Lesueur (d. 1655), which was formerly in their church, Saint-Gervais-Saint-Protais in Paris. According to the "Liber Pontificalis," Pope Innocent I (402–417) dedicated a church to them in Rome. Later, the name of Vitalis, their father, was added to the title of this church (Basilica of San Vitale). Very early on, their names were inserted into the Litany of the Saints.

In 835, Angilbert II, Bishop of Milan, placed the relics of the three saints in a porphyry sarcophagus, where they were found in January 1864.

A tradition claims that, after the destruction of Milan by Frederick Barbarossa, his chancellor, Rainald of Dassel, had taken the relics from Milan and deposited them at Breisach in Germany, whence some came to Soissons. The claim is rejected by Milan.

Nevertheless, they were venerated by farmers in Germany and a German saying amongst harvesters was: "Wenn's regnet auf Gervasius / es vierzig Tage regnen muss" ("When it rains on St Gervasius' Day / forty days of rain will follow"). Thus, as with the cults of Saint Swithun, Saint Medard, the Seven Sleepers, and Saint Godelieve, that of Sts Gervasius and Protasius was connected with the weather.

A famous series of tapestries of the "Life of Gervasius and Protasius," donated to the Cathedral of Antwerp in 1509, is displayed in the cathedral's choir.

== Veneration of the Saints in Kerala ==
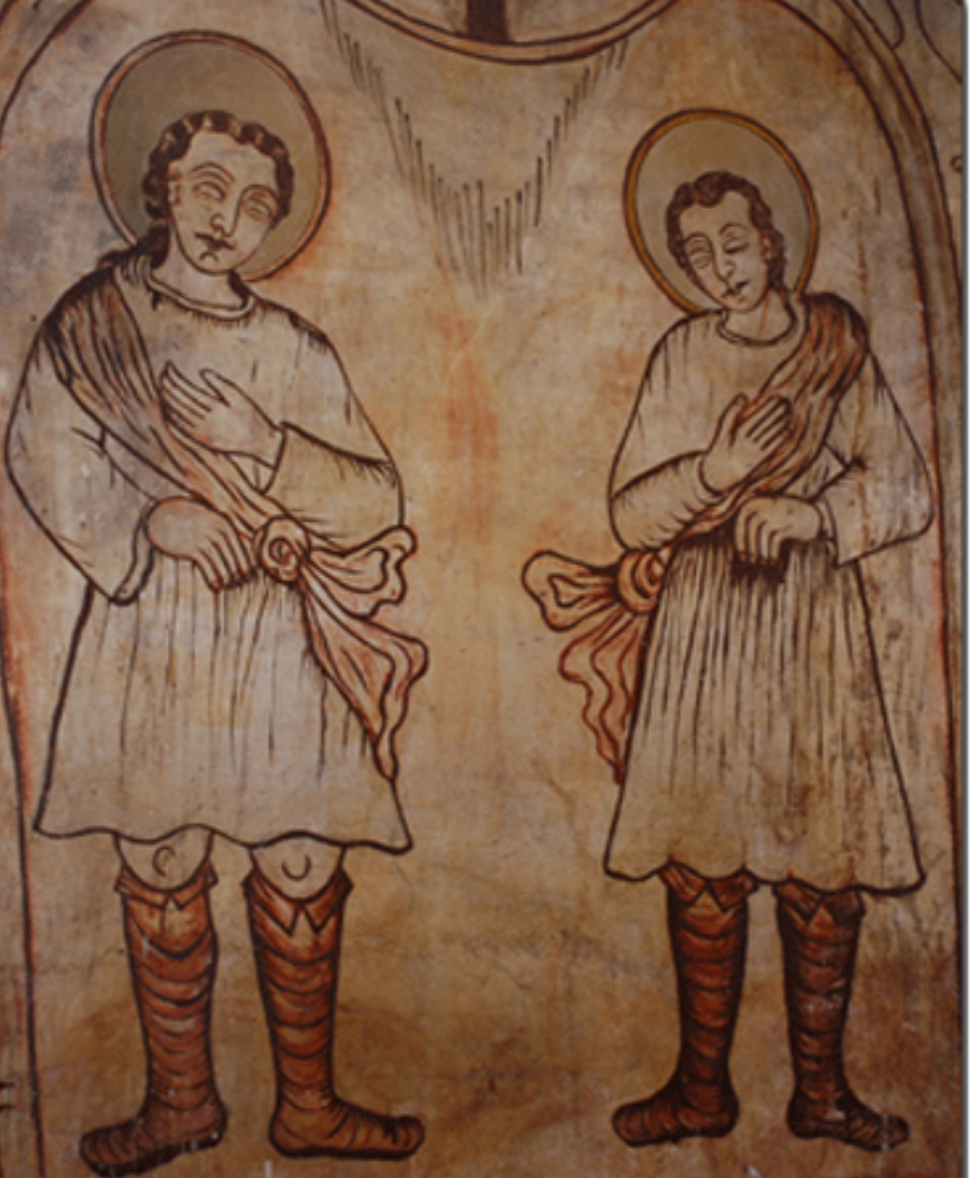
Kollam Kadeesha Syrian Church

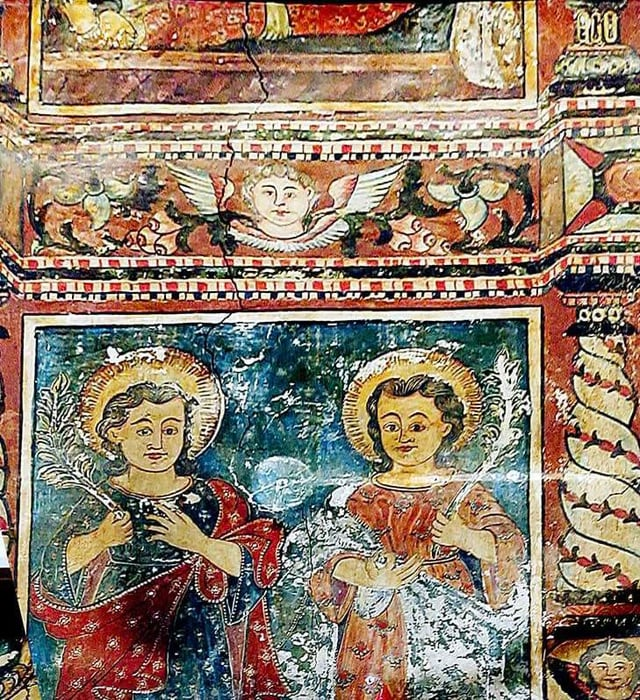
Mar Sabor and Mar Proth Jacobite Cathedral, Akaparamb

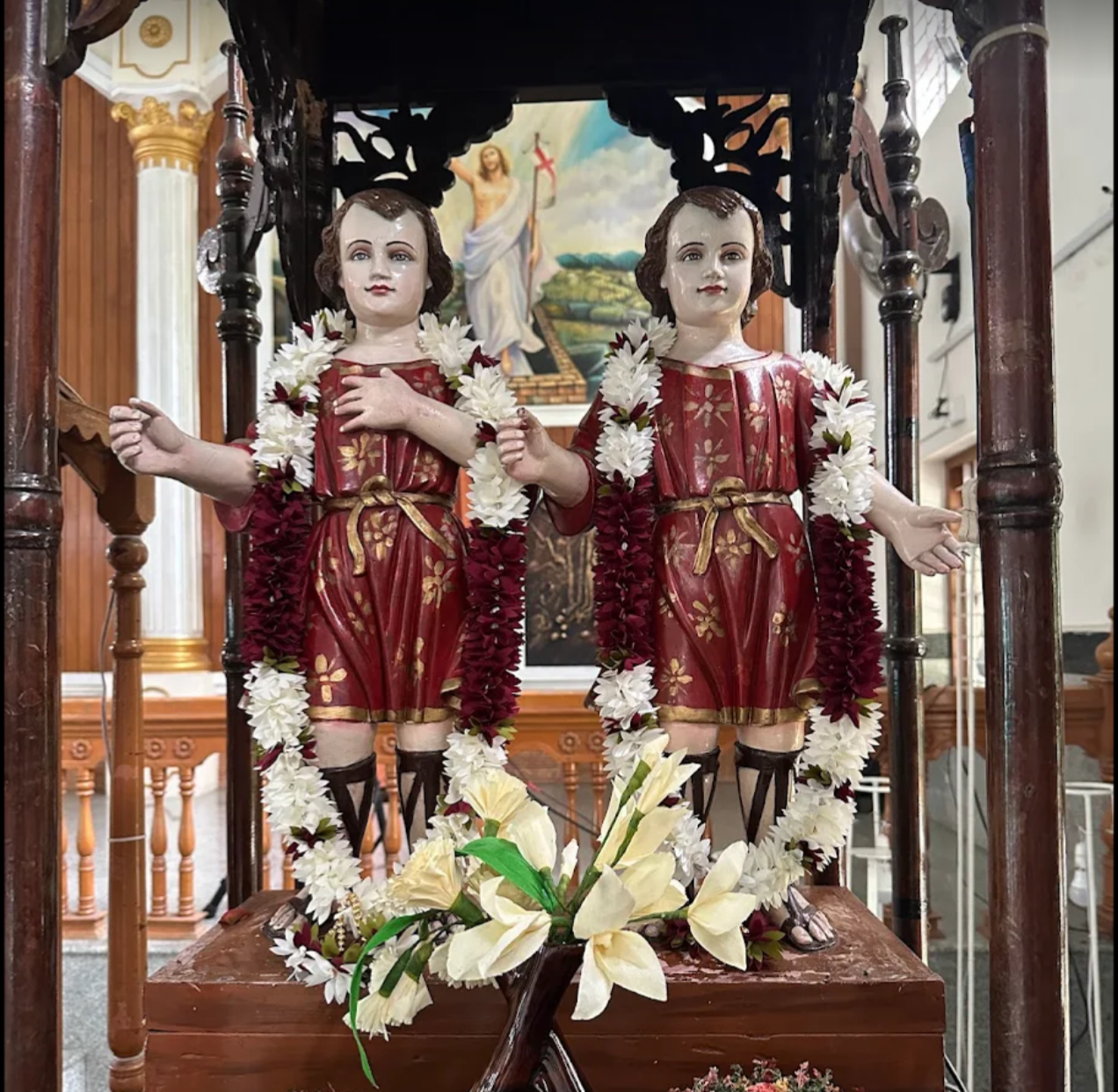
Ss Gervasius and Protasius church Akaparambu

The Syrian Catholics of Kerala refer to these saints as 'Kandeeshangal'.

In ancient times, the Mar Thoma Christians used this name to refer to Mar Sabor and Mar Proth, who came to Kerala from Persia in the ninth century. Even today, it remains unclear which church they belonged to.

According to the decisions of the Synod of Diamper (Udayamperoor Sunnahados), a decree was issued to change the names of churches dedicated to Persian bishops and instead name them after these Roman saints.

There is a belief that childless couples will be blessed with twins through the intercession of these saints, and many believers bear witness to this today.

In Indian Orthodox and Jacobite churches, there are instances where people mistake the imagery of these Roman saints for Mar Sabor and Mar Proth and venerate them as such.

== See also ==
- Kantheesangal
- St-Gervais-et-St-Protais Church
- San Gervasio (disambiguation)
- San Trovaso
