= Waterways transport in Kerala =

Waterways have always been an important mode of transport in Kerala. The total length of navigable route in Kerala was 1,900 kilometres and the navigable rivers constitute about 54 per cent of the waterways. The 41 West-flowing rivers together with the backwaters are an integrated part of the inland navigation system in Kerala. In Kerala water transportation through these channels are mainly small distant passenger services, informal country boats, freight transportation to PSU's such as Fertilisers and Chemicals Travancore, Kochi etc.

The State's inland waterways pass through highly populated regions. The majority of those inhabiting the region adjoining water ways were engaged in traditional industries such as coir, cashew, brick-making and fishing. Modernization of the inland waterways can have significant impact on these population. Till early 20 th century waterways was major transportation mode in Travancore–Cochin region. Development of railways and bridges on roads reduced their significance. The yet to complete discontinuous West Coast Canal (WCC) . is major project conceived to revive waterways and shift significant transportation through waterways.

Also along with the Thiruvananthapuram–Kasargode Semi High Speed Rail Corridor and National Highway 66 Kanyakumari to Mumbai (Trivandrum - Kasaragod stretch in Kerala) WCC will complete a network of multimodal north south corridor across Kerala.

In pre-independence era especially transportation across Kerala was mainly through boats. Road networks in state were quite insufficient. However, later when roadways and railways started to develop the importance of waterways started to diminish. In later part of 20th century the past glory of waterways had in 18th and 19th century depleted rapidly. However, in 21st century there started to get a renewed emphasis on waterways of state. In 2005 the then President of India Shri. A. P. J. Abdul Kalam presented a 10-point development agenda aimed at making the State an economic powerhouse by 2015.In this he mentioned strongly about the potential of water ways of Kerala.

== Major Waterways of Kerala ==
Almost all the major water way systems in Kerala are part of the West Coast canal system (WCC). This canal system is a mix of backwaters, river streams and man-made canal systems. Few significant navigable stretch in this grand system (some of which are in dilapidated situation currently) are as follows,

- National Waterway 3 - Kollam to Kozhikkode - 375 km - comprising West Coast canal, Champakkara Canal and, Udyogamandal Canal, Ashtamudi Lake, Kayamkulam Kayal, Vembanad Lake and distributaries of Periyar (river).
- Thiruvananthapuram–Shoranur canal - comprising Bharathappuzha river system, Kollam Canal, Kadinamkulam Kayal etc.
- Conolly Canal - nearly 200 km, Kodungallur to Vatakara through Kozhikode.
- Alappuzha-Sherthala (AS Canal) - 22 km from Vada Canal in Alappuzha to Vembanad lake near Cherthala.
- National Waterway 8 - Alappuzha-Changanassery Canal - 28 km.
- National Waterway 9 - Alappuzha-Kottayam-Athirampuzha Canal - 38 km. This waterways can improve navigation prospectus of cargo to Kottayam Port. It also uses Meenachil River system and Vembanad. It connects Mannanam and Kainikkara, the birthplace of St.Kuriakose Elias Chavara.
- National Waterway 59 - Kottayam-Vaikom Canal - 28 km. It commence near Kodimatha in Kottayam town and passes through Meenachil River via Illikkal, Thiruvaataa, Pulikkuttisseri to enter Vembanad Lake near Cheepungal then it reaches Vaikom through Thanneermukkom Bund.
- AVM Canal (National Waterway 13) - 11 km from Colachel in Tamil Nadu to Pozhiyoor in Trivandrum.
- Manjaly Canal - a 17 km water way connecting Angamaly with Periyar River.

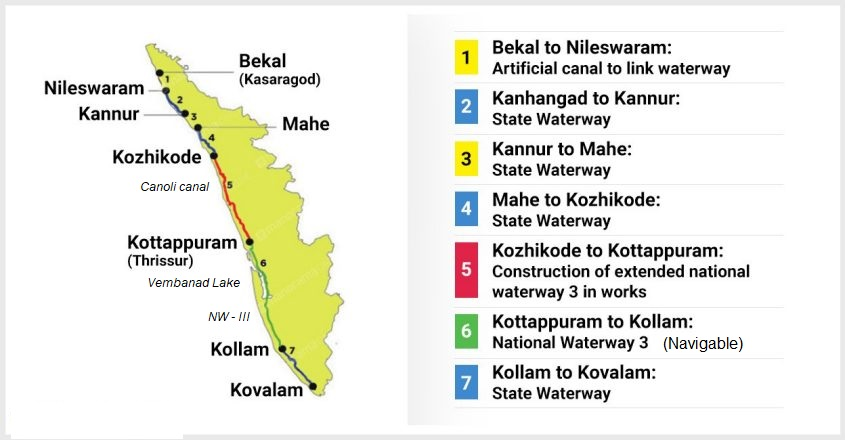
The water ways of Kerala

=== West Coast Canal System (WCC). ===
WCC is the arterial inland waterway of the State, which is being developed to the standard of a National Waterway. This is a ₹2,300-crore rupees project that is intended to make the entire 633 km long water ways along Kerala coast from Kovalam (Thiruvananthapuram district) to Bekal (Kasaragod district) fully navigable and connect the three major international airports of Kerala such as Trivandrum International Airport, Cochin International Airport and Kannur International Airport through waterways by May 2020. The project was handled by Kerala Waterways and Infrastructures Ltd., the Special Purpose Vehicle (SPV) set up on Oct 2017 for the timely development of inland waterways. The Government of Kerala and Cochin International Airport have stakes in it. The SPV is entrusted with duties such as cross structure construction, dredging, widening and cleaning the waterways. Their first project was rejuvenation of the 18 km Akkulam - Kovalam stretch of Parvathi Puthannaar in Trivandrum awarded to them in May 2018. The National Transportation Planning and Research Centre, in its techno-economic feasibility study, said 16.6 per cent of the total goods traffic by road could be diverted to the inland water transport system once WCC is completed. The various stretches of WCC from South to North of Kerala are as follows,

- Kovalam - Aakkulam - Parvathi Puthannaar (Trivandrum) portion
- TS Canal (Vallakkadavu - Kadinamkulam lake - Anchuthengu lake - Varkala Tunnel - Edava Nadayara Kaayal - Paravur Kayal - Kollam Canal - National Waterway 3 stretches till Ponnani excluding Ponnani -Shoranur stretch)
- National Waterway 3 - Kollam to Kozhikode 375 km.
- Canoli Canal
- Vatakara - Mahé Canal - 17.4 km stretch passing through Thiruvallur, Maniyoor, Villiyapilly, Purameri, and Ayancherry in the Kuttiyadi constituency; Edacherry in the Nadapuram constituency; and Eramala and Azhiyoor in the Vadakara constituency. This is also part of Vision Vadakara 2025.
- Mahé - Valapattanam Canal - 51 km (of which 26 km runs through the existing water bodies and the rest 25 km needs an artificial cut).- this was a missing link in the backwater system running parallel Northern Kerala Coast and a hence, major obstacle to the inland navigation potential of the region. This stretch needs man made canals on three stretches so as to link Mahé River system with Valapattanam River system through Anjarakkandy river, Kuyyalipuzha and Dharmadom river. The upstream stretch of Anjarakkandy river from the canal till Mattanur will be made navigable to connect WCC with Kannur International Airport. The alignment of this canal is as follows,
  - Begins as an artificial cut beginning at Mahé River near Peringathur and ending at Kuyyalipuzha near Ponniam through Palathayi, Elankode, Kannamvally and Mokery for a distance of 9.2 km.
  - Then it continues down stream through Kuyyalipuzha till near Thalassery suburbs.
  - From Kuyyalipuzha a man-made channel of 0.85 km is made for canal to enter into Dharmadom river which is a distributary of Anjarakkandy river.
  - In Anjarakkandy river system the canal travels till end of Dharmadam Island and then another man-made artificial cut begins near Mamakunnu which travels 15 km long through Kadachira, Chala, Varam and Chelora and meet Valapattanam River.
  - Thereafter the canal goes downstream up till Valapattanam town through the river.
  - There are local protests against the Mahé - Valapattanam artificial waterway.
- Valapattanam- Neeleeswaram waterway - 50 km
  - This is longest natural waterway in Malabar region.
  - It travels from Valapattanam to Pazhayangadi for a distance of 13 km by taking down stream of Valapattanam River till Azhikkal estuary and then upstream on Kuppam River till Pazhayangadi.
  - At Pazhayangadi it enters into Sulthan Thodu or Sulthan Canal a 4 km man made canal till Madayi. Sulthan Canal was completed by Arakkal kingdom in 1766 during the Mysorean invasion of Malabar by Sultanate of Mysore.
  - From Madayi the waterway enters into Perumba River system and exit into Valiyaparamba-Kavvayi Backwaters at Kavvayi.
  - Then it pass through Ayitti (Thrikaripur), Padanna of Kannur - Kasaragod district.
- Neeleeswaram - Bekal, Kasaragod waterway - 24 km (completing the 140 km long Payyoli - Bekal reach of WCC).
  - This reach involves a 6.5 km artificial waterway between Chittari River and Neeleshwaram River. There are lot of local protest against this project.

=== Canals and Waterways of Alappuzha ===
Alappuzha is called the Venice of the East. No other town in Kerala must have relied on waterways and canals as much as Alappuzha does. The water way system in Alappuzha developed because of architect of the city Raja Kesavadas in 18th century. The major canals and waterways in Alappuzha town and adjoining areas are,

- AS Canal or Alappuzha Cherthala Canal
- Vada canal
- Link Canal
- Commercial Canal
- Kottaram Thodu
- Kappirithode

=== Ferry ===
Water transportation also exists as numerous small ferry (kadathu in local dialect) at various parts of the state mainly on rivers. This facilitate to cross from one shore to other where bridges are absent. It is cost effective and can be established even at higher reaches of river which are normally not having formal navigation facilities.

There are also big ferries that facilitate even vehicles to cross the channel. Some important ones in state are,

- Azhikode - Munambam Jangar Ferry
- Fort Kochi - Vypin RoRo Jangar Ferry
- Vaikom - Thavanakadavu Ferry.
- Kannankadu Ferry, Munroe Island.
- Perumon Jangar, Munroe Island.
- Manjapetty Ferry across Periyar (river).
- Chaliyam - Beypore ferry
- Azhikkal - Matool ferry.

=== Boating in Dam ===
There are also boat services in many reservoirs in Kerala. These boat services are primarily operated for tourism purposes. There are also few places such as Amboori, Neyyar Dam where there is country boat ferry services through reservoir to connect tribal hamlets. Major reservoir boating facilities are,

- Thenmala Dam
- Thekkady
- Kakkayam Dam
- Mattupetty Dam
- Idukki Dam
- Bhoothathankettu
- Sengulam Dam
- Malampuzha Dam
- Neyyar Dam
- Kallarkutti Dam
- Adavi Eco Tourism etc.

== Significance ==
- Trivandrum International Airport is the only airport in country that is linked with water ways, i.e. TS Canal.
- SmartCity, Kochi and Technopark Kollam are two IT Parks of Kerala that has waterway linkage.
- The Varkala Tunnel in Kerala is the longest and only tunnel in a waterway in India.
- Kollam KSWTD Terminal - Alappuzha boat journey is the longest passenger boat service in South India.
- Kochi Water Metro is the first water metro system in India and the first integrated water transport system of this size in Asia.
- Kettuvallam of Alappuzha, various Vallam kali held in state adds distinct cultural significance and tourism value for waterways in Kerala. It has also became premise for many works in Malayalam literature, Cinema of India etc.
- India's first Solar powered ferry Aditya operates between Vaikom and Thavanakadavu.

== Traffic ==
=== Kerala State Water Transport Department ===
The SWTD - State Water Transport Department transports about 150 lakhs of passengers per annum using wooden/steel and fibre Glass Passenger Boats. Approximately 40,000 people use their service every day. It operates vehicle carrier (Two-wheeler) boats in ferry services. The operating distance per day is 700 km approximately.

- The State Water Transport Department of Kerala (SWTD), has passenger boat services in following districts,
  - Kollam (Ashtamudi Lake)
  - Alappuzha (Kayamkulam Lake, Vembanad Lake)
  - Kottayam (Vembanad Lake)
  - Ernakulam (Vembanad lake, Champakara Canal and Udyogmandal Canal )
  - Kannur (Valapattanam River)
  - Kasaragod (Valiyaparamba backwaters)
- They have water taxi service in Alappuzha.
- There is also water ambulance services operated by SWTD.

=== Kochi Water Metro ===
It is first of its kind in India. Intended to integrate with Kochi Metro and serve under Unified Metropolitan Transportation Authority of Kochi city.

=== Freight Traffic ===
Fertilisers and Chemicals Travancore runs barges through Champakkara Canal in Kochi to transport materials between Ambalamedu and Kochi Port. There is also container movement between Kottayam Inland Port and International Container Transshipment Terminal, Kochi.

=== Tourism ===
Numerous Tourist Boats and Kettuvallam (Houseboats) of Kerala are found near Kollam, Alappuzha, Kumarakom, Kochi and Valiyaparamba in North Malabar. Alumkadavu near Karunagappalli is a major center of luxury house boat manufacturing in Kerala. There are boat services done in many reservoirs in Kerala for tourists.

Kerala Shipping and Inland Navigation Corporation has a mini cruise ship named Nefereti which conduct tourist service from Kerala backwaters to open seas at Kochi.

== Major Accidents ==
- 1924 Pallana Boat Accident in Alappuzha, Mahakavi Kumaran Asan and 23 others got killed.
- 1980 Kannamaali Accident in Ernakulam, 29 people got killed.
- 1983 Vallarpadam Accident, 18 got killed.
- 1990 Peppara Dam Accident, 7 got killed.
- 1991 Punnamada Accident, three lost life.
- 1994 Vellayikkode boat accident, Kozhikkode, six got killed.
- 1997 Aluva Accident, 4 killed
- 2002 Kumarakom boat disaster, 29 got killed.
- 2007 Thattekad boat disaster, 18 got killed.
- 2009 Thekkady boat disaster, 45 got killed.
- 2023 Tanur boat disaster, 22 got killed

== See also ==
- Department of Coastal Shipping and Inland Navigation (Kerala)
- Kerala Shipping and Inland Navigation Corporation
- Kerala State Water Transport Department
- Kottayam Port
- Kochi Water Metro
