= AVM Canal =

Water link in India

The Anantha-Victoria-Marthandam Canal a.k.a. A.V.M. Canal was conceived as a 'water link' between Thiruvananthapuram and Kanyakumari in July 1860 during the reign of Uthradam Thirunal Marthanda Varma Maharaja of Travancore state. Today it is the National Waterway 13 of India.

== History ==
The A.V.M. Canal was conceived as a 'water link' between Thiruvananthapuram and Kanyakumari in July 1860 during the reign of Uthram Thirunal Marthanda Varma Maharaja of Travancore state.. Parts of it were completed, but the project was by and large abandoned, and with the advent of faster road transport, consigned to oblivion. Along with the Thiruvananthapuram–Shoranur canal which now forms the spine of the modern waterway project in Kerala, the AVM canal network would have formed a formidable water route linking the northern parts of Kerala to Kanyakumari paving way for a continuous waterway along west coast from Kasaragod to Kanyakumari.

The canal was named after Lord Ananthapadmanabha - the tutelary deity - Queen Victoria and Marthanda Varma, the AVM Canal was literally a 'golden' project, its inauguration having been performed with a golden spade. But the spade also was lost.

The AVM canal was meant to link Kovalam with Nagercoil in phase one. ''In phase two, the canal was to be extended to Kanyakumari. In fact, work was started in different places, but the canal was never completed. The reach between Colachel and Poovar was reportedly completed by 1867 and a shorter reach linking Thiruvananthapuram and Thiruvallam was finished a few years later.

The Anantha Victoria Marthandam Canal was formed to connect the extreme south of then Thiruvithamkoor princely state with its northern parts and trade centers such as Alappuzha and Kollam. The canal passed through coastal villages numbering more than 20, including, Pozhiyoor, Marthandanthurai, Thengapattanam, Colachel, and Mandaikadu, they all depended upon this for most of their needs, including agriculture and navigation, but today the purpose is no longer served due to expansion of road ways.

Former Chief Minister J Jayalalithaa was in favour of the revival. A project also was drawn up. But it went in limbo.

The National Waterways Act, 2016 declared AVM canal as the National Waterways 13 of India.

== Potential ==
The completion of Vizhinjam International Seaport and Enayam International Seaport will make this canal as an inland waterway facilitating connection between both ports. This waterway will also help connect tourist spots of Poovar, Kovalam, Varkala and, Kanyakumari by mode of water transport. It will also help connect the Neyyar river system with Kuzhithurai river system and hence irrigation.

== See also ==
- TS Canal
- Waterways transport in Kerala
