= Marthandanthurai =

Neighbourhood in Kanyakumari district, Tamil Nadu, India

- Village
- Location in India
- Coordinates: 8°17′15″N 77°6′18″E
- Country: India
- District: Kanyakumari

Government
  - Body: Kollemcode town panchayat

Languages
  - Official: Tamil; English; Malayalam
- Time zone: UTC+5:30 (IST)
- Postal code: 629160
- Vehicle registration: TN 75
- Civic agency: Kollemcode town panchayat
- Website: www.marthandanthurai.com

Marthandanthurai is a coastal village on the shore of the Arabian Sea in Kanyakumari district, Tamil Nadu, India, near the border with Kerala and Tamil Nadu. The village is part of the Kollemcode panchayat. It belongs to the Roman Catholic Archdiocese of Trivandrum from 1967. Prior to joining with the Trivandrum Latin Archdiocese, this village was a part of the Roman Catholic Diocese of Cochin. The village is known for its beauty and versatility. It is a pilgrimage centre of Our Lady of Lourdu and is dedicated to the patronage of Our Lady of Dolours. The historical AVM Canal flows through this village. Its golden sand beach is the attraction of this tourist village. Being the part of Kollemcode Town Panchayat, this is the prime centre of trade and transportation for the neighboring villages. The 70% of people live in Marthandanthurai speak Malayalam as their major spoken language and the remainder speak a mixture of Tamil and Malayalam. In short, it can be said that people have their own colloquial way of talking and language. This language slang has big difference among neighbor regions and villages. Marthandanthurai the name sometimes referred as "Land of Marthanda Varma" because the king who did a lot of favors to this village. The villages of Vallavilai and Neerody are located near the village Marthandanthurai. This Village is located nearly 70 km from Kanyakumari and 30 km from Trivandrum.

== History ==
The history of this village lays back with the history of His Highness Marthanda Varma Maharaja, the then Ruler of Travancore. There are a lot of myths regarding its origin.

== Festivals ==
- Feast of Our Lady of Dolours, on 15 September
- Feast of Our Lady of Lourdes, on 11 February
- Feast of Saint Joseph, on 19 March/ 1 May
- Feast of St. Mother Teresa, on 05 September

== Village parts ==
- Soosai Puram Colony
- Vyakula Madha Colony
- Lourdhu Madha Colony
- Kovil Vilagam
- School Vilagam
- Mother Teresa Junction
- Changuvilagam
- Medavilagm
- Simon's Nagar
- St. Andrew's Street
- St.Kochu Theresia Street
- John Bonal Nager

== Anantha Victoria Marthandan Canal ==
The A.V.M. Canal was conceived as a 'water link' between Thiruvananthapuram and Kanyakumari in July 1860 during the reign of Uthradam Thirunal Marthanda Varma Maharaja of Travancore state.. Parts of it were completed, but the project was by and large abandoned, and with the advent of faster road transport, consigned to oblivion. Along with the Thiruvananthapuram–Shoranur canal which now forms the spine of the modern waterway project in Kerala, the AVM canal network would have formed a formidable water route linking the northern parts of Kerala to Kanyakumari paving way for a continuous waterway along west coast from Kasaragod to Kanyakumari.

The canal was named after Lord Ananthapadmanabha - the tutelary deity - Queen Victoria and Marthanda Varma, the AVM Canal was literally a 'golden' project, its inauguration having been performed with a golden spade. But the spade also was lost.

The AVM canal was meant to link Kovalam with Nagercoil in phase one. ''In phase two, the canal was to be extended to Kanyakumari. In fact, work was started in different places, but the canal was never completed. The reach between Colachel and Poovar was reportedly completed by 1867 and a shorter reach linking Thiruvananthapuram and Thiruvallam was finished a few years later.

The Anantha Victoria Marthandam Canal was formed to connect the extreme south of then Thiruvithamkoor princely state with its northern parts and trade centers such as Alappuzha and Kollam. The canal passed through coastal villages numbering more than 20, including, Pozhiyoor, Marthandanthurai, Thengapattanam, Colachel, and Mandaikadu, they all depended upon this for most of their needs, including agriculture and navigation, but today the purpose is no longer served due to expansion of road ways.

Former Chief Minister J Jayalalithaa was in favour of the revival. A project also was drawn up. But it went in limbo.

The National Waterways Act, 2016 declared AVM canal as the National Waterways 13 of India

== Schools ==
- St. Aloysius H.S.S. which started its Lower Primary section in 1800. It has Tamil, English and Malayalam mediums.
- Govt Primary School Marthandanthurai. It has Tamil and Malayalam mediums and it is located in vallavilai ( Near SMAC football ground) because of old land issues ).
- John Bonal Matriculation School, run by the Charity Sisters of St. Anne, started in 2000.

== Notable people ==
- Archbishop Maria Callist Soosa Pakiam
