= Varkala Tunnel =

Water tunnel system in Trivandrum, India

Varkala Tunnel, Trivandrum
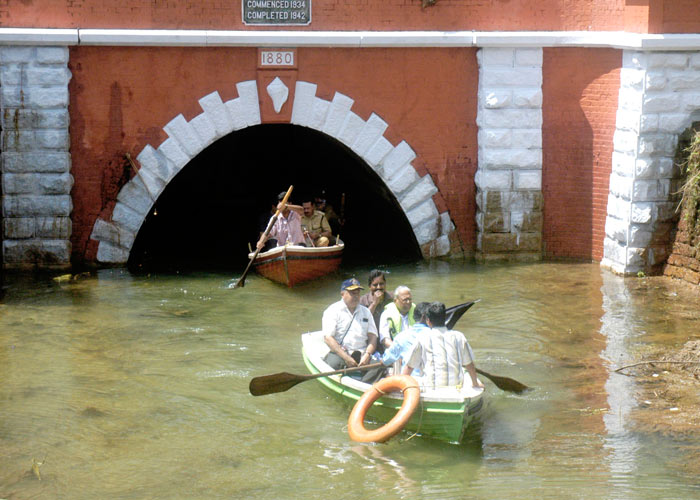
- Former Chief minister VS Achudhananthan visiting Varkala Tunnel in 2006
- Interactive map of Varkala Tunnel, Trivandrum

Overview
- Location: Varkala, Trivandrum, Kerala
- Status: Closed 2007; 19 years ago
- Route: Trivandrum–Kollam
- Start: 8.7365°N 76.730°E
- End: 8.7167°N 76.721°E

Operation
- Work began: 1867; 159 years ago
- Constructed: Kingdom of Travancore
- Opened: 1877; 149 years ago
- Owner: Government of Kerala
- Operator: Kerala Inland Waterways and Infrastructure Limited
- Traffic: National Waterway 3
- Toll: No

Technical
- Length: 1,069.848 m (0.664773 mi)
- No. of lanes: 2
- Operating speed: 25 km/h (16 mph)
- Tunnel clearance: 10 metres (33 ft)
- Width: 10

== History ==
The Varkala Tunnel is a 19th-century canal tunnel system in Varkala, Trivandrum, Kerala, India. Constructed between 1867 and 1877 under the Kingdom of Travancore, it connected southern and northern waterways and supported inland trade. The tunnel was built under Dewan Sir T. Madhava Rao, with Chief Engineer Walthew Clarence Barton overseeing construction.

The twin tunnels, at Sivagiri (722 m) and Chilakkoor (350 m), enabled the transport of goods such as coir, rice, and cashew for nearly a century. By the mid-20th century, the rise of roads and railways led to disuse, and the tunnel was officially closed in 2007 due to siltation and encroachments.

== Technical specifications ==
- Length: 1,069.848 metres (0.664 mi)
- Width: 10 metres (33 ft)
- Height/Clearance: 10 metres (33 ft)
- Number of lanes: 2
- Operating speed: 25 km/h (16 mph)
- Traffic: Part of National Waterway 3

== Modern revival ==
The tunnel is part of the West Coast Canal (WCC) Project, managed by Kerala Waterways and Infrastructure Limited (KWIL). Restoration work includes dredging, structural reinforcement, and preparation for safe navigation. The project aims to integrate the tunnel into heritage tourism and eco-friendly inland waterway transport.

=== Key milestones ===
- 2017 – KWIL incorporated for WCC project
- 2020 – Initial dredging and de-silting at Varkala
- 2023 – Structural certification of the tunnels by Konkan Railway Corporation
- 2025 – Scheduled commissioning of Akkulam–Chettuva stretch, including Varkala Tunnel

Social rehabilitation under the Punargeham scheme has relocated over 400 families with financial packages exceeding ₹240 crore.

== Tourism and cultural significance ==
The tunnel’s reopening will feature electric vessels offering zero-emission rides and light-and-sound shows narrating local history and heritage. The project is part of the Varkala Destination Development Master Plan, which aims to diversify tourism in the region beyond beaches, including canal cruises, walkways, and hospitality investments.

== See also ==
- Waterways transport in Kerala
- TS Canal
- AVM Canal
- Kollam Canal
