= National Waterway 3 =

National waterway of India

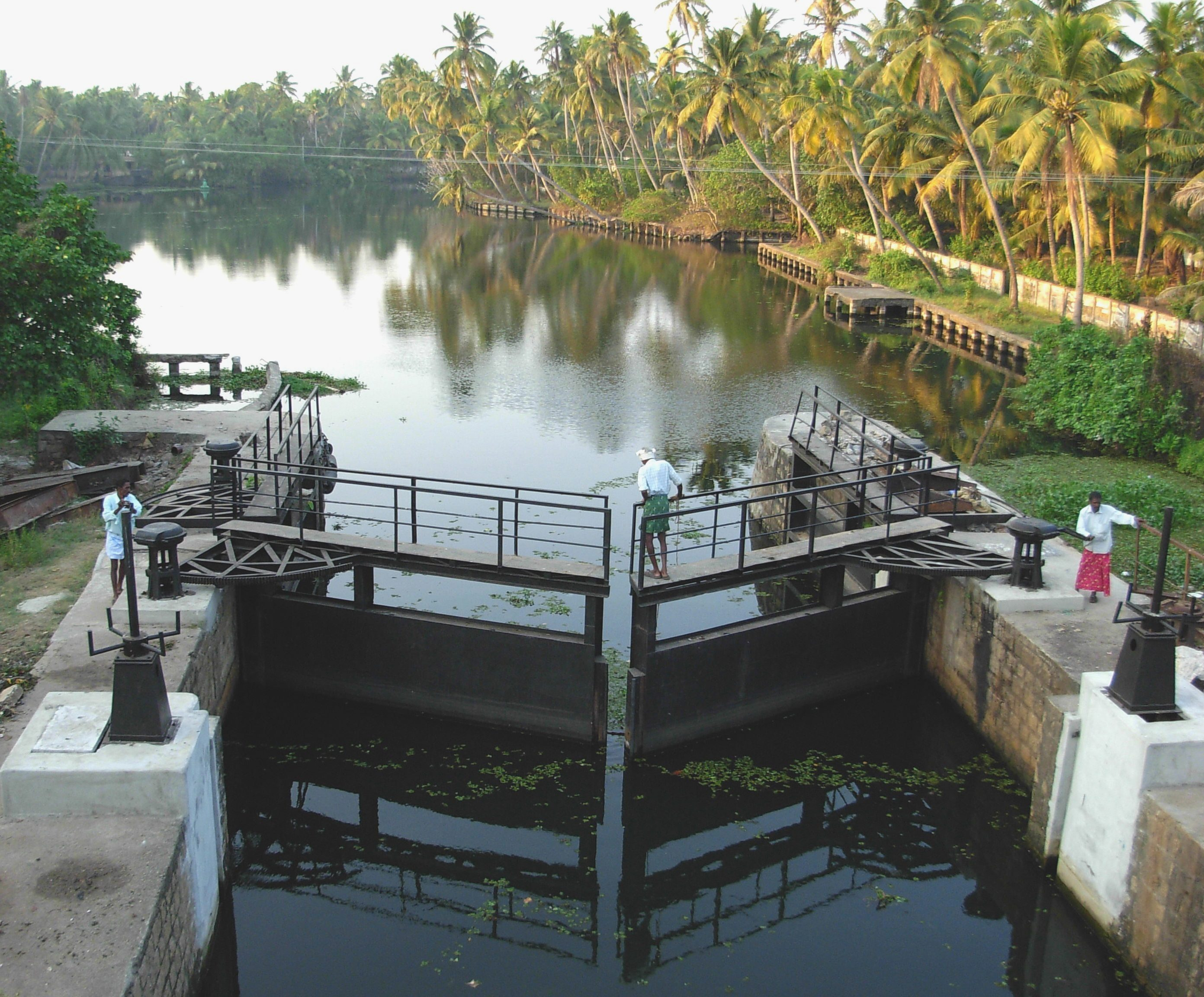

Details
- Location: Kerala, India
- Opened: February 1993; 33 years ago
- Length: 205 km
- North end: Kottapuram (extended to Kozhikode as per National Waterways Act, 2016)
- South end: Kollam
- No. of terminals: 9
- Owner: Inland Waterways Authority of India
- Operator: Central Inland Water Transport Corporation

The West Coast Canal or National Waterway No 3 is a 205 km (127 mi) long inland navigational route located in Kerala, India, which runs from Kollam to Kottapuram. It was declared a National Waterway in 1993. In addition to the main stretch, Champakara and Udyogamandal canals are navigable and connect the industrial centers of Kochi to Kochi port Inland Waterways Authority of India (IWAI) under the Ministry of Shipping is coordinating the task for developing, monitoring and administering national waterways. It is the first National Waterway in the country with 24-hour navigation facilities along the entire stretch. It has been extended to Kozhikode by the National Waterways Act, 2016. The National Waterway 3 mainly passes through the previous Thiruvananthapuram–Shoranur canal.

== History ==
Waterways have always been an important mode of transport in Kerala. The total length of navigable route in Kerala was 1,900 km (1,200 mi) and the navigable rivers constitute about 54 per cent of the waterways. The 41 West-flowing rivers together with the backwaters are an integrated part of the inland navigation system in Kerala. The State's inland waterways pass through highly populated regions - the West Coast Canal, for instance. The majority of those inhabiting the region were engaged in traditional industries such as coir, cashew, brick-making and fishing. Any attempt to develop the inland waterways will favorably impact the well-being of these people.

On the main West Coast Canal between Kollam and Kottapuram, the Kochi Edapallikota (120 km) stretch was opened for cargo movement during November 1994 consequent to improvement works carried out by IWAI. Capital dredging for widening and deepening of canal between Kochi and Kollam was started in first phase during 1997–98. In Kochi – Kottapuram stretch, capital dredging was started in 2nd phase during September 2002. Work in Kochi–Allapuzha sector was completed and in Kochi–Kottapuram sector (30 km (19 mi)) dredging was completed except 4.83 km (3.00 mi). But in the remaining reaches, it got delayed due to various problems such as disposal of dredged material, fishing nets, local issues leading to contractual problems etc. Out of the entire length of 205 km of the waterway, the total shoal length has been estimated as 87.16 km (54.16 mi) out of which 59.75 km (37.13 mi) has so far been dredged and 24.49 km (15.22 mi) remains to be dredged. The total quantity which was to be dredged for deepening the entire shoal length was worked out as 4,033,000 m3 out of which 2,398,000 m3 has been dredged and 1,635,000 m3 remains to be dredged. Project for providing and maintaining 24 hrs navigational aids by way of buoys and lights had been completed during 2007-08 and now the entire waterway has the facility for 24 hrs navigation which was maintained during 2008–09.

== Course ==
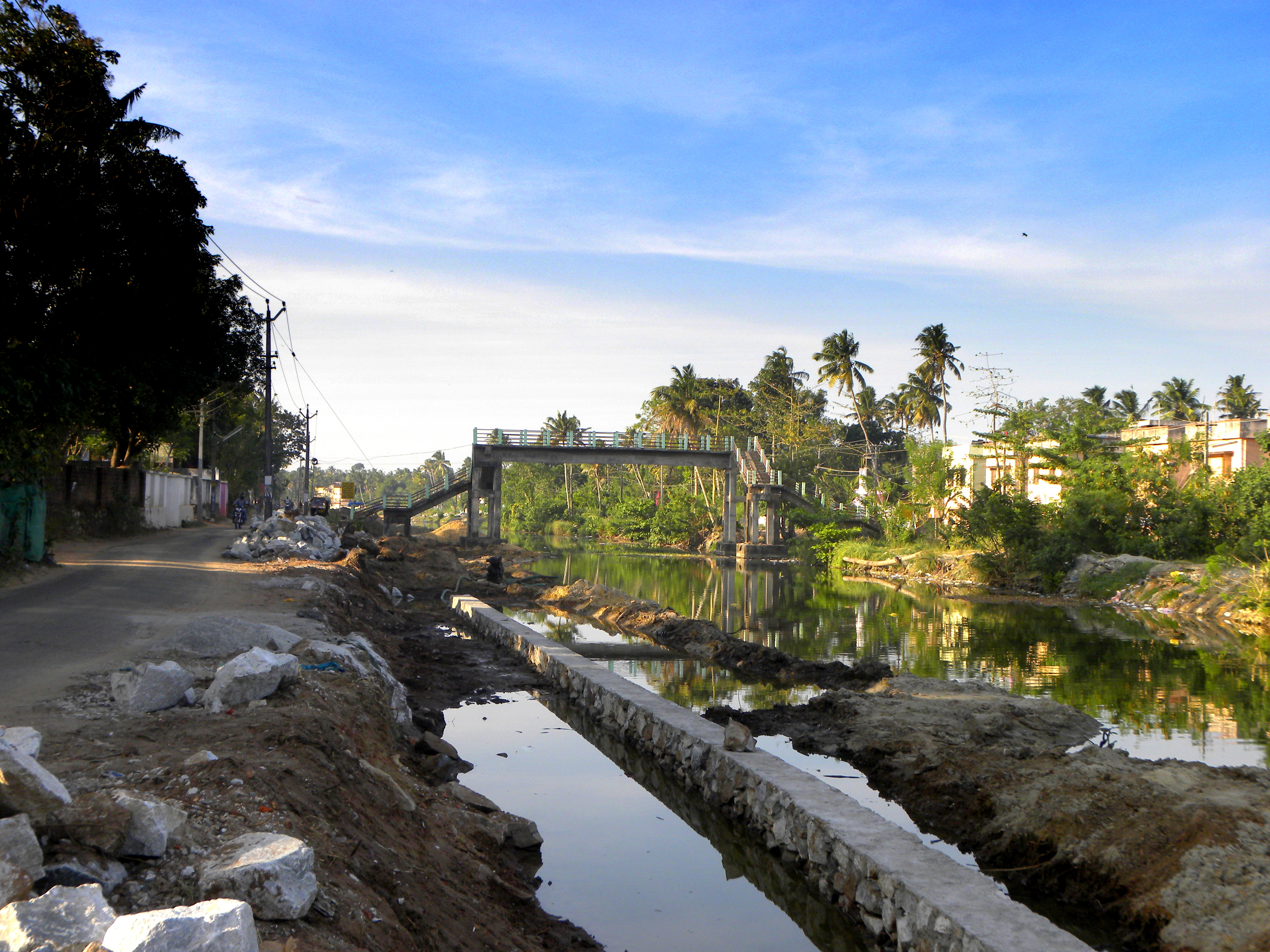
Kollam Canal(part of NW-3) at Eravipuram

Kerala's backwaters offer incomparable beauty and unique experience which have contributed to its inclusion in the list of 50 must-see places in the world. Kerala back waters include the Kuttanad region, called the rice bowl of Kerala, where paddy cultivation done on fields which are below sea level, lake Vembanad the largest stretch of backwaters in Kerala, lake Ashtamudi and lake Kayamkulam. The palm-fringed, tranquil backwaters which house hundreds of River Cruise between Kochi to Alleppey, also known as Venice of the East is popular among tourists. M.V.Vrinda-an exclusive river cruiser with 8 tastefully appointed luxury cabins takes tourists from Kochi along the main waterway on lake Vembanad, Kerala's largest backwater stretch to Alleppey tourists are taken in smaller country boats on rice excursion, tour of traditional Kerala family residence Water bodies in the city, such as the Kochi, Perandoor and Thevara canals, were being used for navigation till some decades ago. One can reach here from Thripunithura to Kochi in around 20 minutes through the waterways, when the road route takes anywhere up to 90 minutes during peak hours.

West coast canal (Kottapuram - Kollam)	168 km (104 mi)
Udyogmandal canal (Kochi Pathalam bridge)	23 km (14 mi)
Champakara canal (Kochi - Ambalamugal)	14 km (8.7 mi)
Total	205 km (127 mi)

== Traffic ==
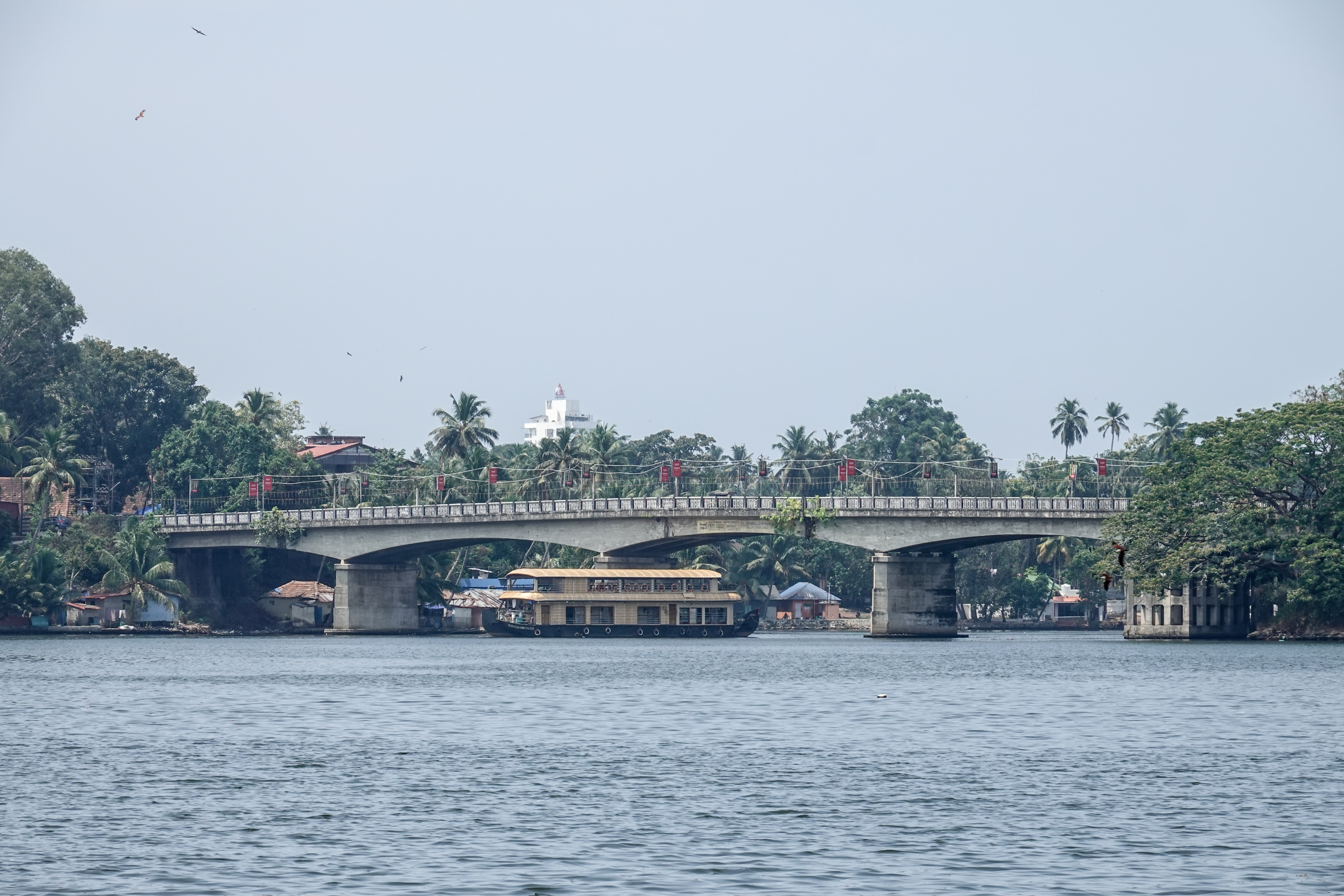
Houseboat on NW3, Ashtamudi Lake, east to west under Thevally Bridge, Kollam

A sizeable quantity of chemicals and fertilizer imports of public sector FACT (raw materials) were being transported through the Udyogamandal canal by barges.

There is a passenger ferry operated by Kerala State Water Transport Department from Vyttila Mobility Hub to Kakkanad stretch of Udhyogamandal Canal from 2013. There are active plans to extend this to Pallikara near Veega land to increase ridership and connectivity. There also passenger boat service operated along the water way from boat jetties at Kollam, Alappuzha, Fort Kochi, Ernakulam etc.

There is daily boat service from Kollam to Alappuzha through this waterway. It is the longest commercial service that is in operation through this waterway at present. The boat service is managed by SWTD Kerala and it takes eight hours to complete the journey.

There is also a high speed air-conditioned daily boat service between Vaikom and Ernakulam through water way. It is called VEGA 120 and the same is also operated by, Kerala.

In addition to this there is also boat and ferry services between Thavanakadavu near Cherthala to Vaikom Jetty across Vembanad. Boat services between Kollam and Sambranikodi near Anchalumoodu, Kollam and Pezhumthuruthu near Munroe Island, Alappuzha and Kottayam, Alappuzha and Kainakary, Ernakulam Jetty and Fort Kochi, Fort Kochi and Vypin, Ernakulam – Mulavukad, Varappuzha – Chittoor, etc.

== Development ==
As an alternative mode of transport, waterways help in dealing with Air pollution and Road Accidents. To divert a share of goods and passenger traffic to the waterway, agencies in the field are toying with the idea of linking the Cochin International Airport and the Kochi port, which are 17.2-km apart. This will be a first of its kind endeavor in the country. A few water bodies on the route will have to be widened and dredged for the project to materialize. Another proposal is to connect navigable canals in Kochi with the waterway.

== Terminals ==
Terminals at seven locations namely Kottapuram, Aluva, Maradu, Vaikom, Thaneermukam (Chertala), Trikkunnapuzha and Kayamkulam have already been constructed. Under PDO/PDC mechanism, the PDO was entrusted the work of formulating a project for operation and maintenance of these terminals as a PPP project. The PDO had made a field visit and collected relevant data and they were in the process of formulating the project. Construction of 8th terminal at Kollam by CPWD was also in progress. For providing facilities for mechanical handling at these terminals, 8 mobile cranes and 8 fork lifts were procured and provided at each terminal.

=== Facilities at terminals on NW 3 ===
Sl No	Terminal location	Area acquired (in hectare)	Length & type of jetty	Storage facilities
1	Kottapuram	0.5823	30 m (RCC Jetty)	200-square metre covered godown and 400-square metre open storage
2	Aluva	1.331	30 m (RCC Jetty)	200-square metre covered godown and 400-square metre open storage
3	Maradu	2.0268	30 m (RCC Jetty)	200-square metre covered godown and 400-square metre open storage
4	Vaikom	0.5184	30 m (RCC Jetty)	200-square metre covered godown and 400-square metre open storage
5	Thannermukkom	0.917	30 m (RCC Jetty)	200-square metre covered godown and 400-square metre open storage
6	Alappuzha	2.2277^{*}	-	-
7	Thrikunnappuzha	0.5057	30 m (RCC Jetty)	200-square metre covered godown and 400-square metre open storage
8	Kayamkulam	1.6304	30 m (RCC Jetty)	200-square metre covered godown and 400-square metre open storage
9	Kollam(Quilon)^{**}	1.6208	30 m (RCC Jetty)	200-square metre covered godown and 400-square metre open storage
10	CEPZ	1.2234		-^{***}
11	Chavra	0.8061		-^{***}
12	Bolgatty	0.8000	Ro-Ro/Lo-Lo service	Container terminal
13	Willingdon Island	0.5000	Ro-Ro/Lo-Lo service	Container terminal

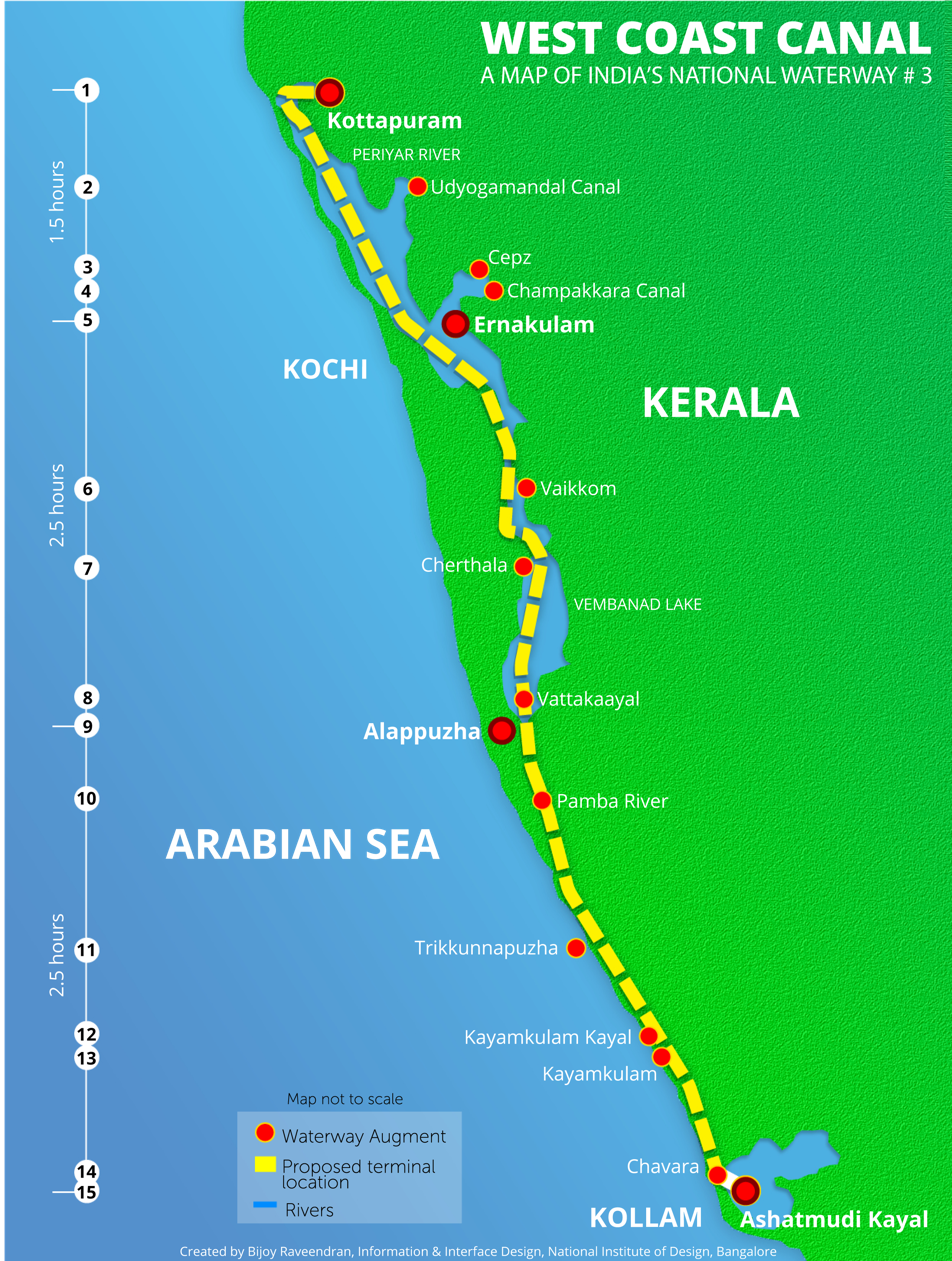
A schematic of India's national waterway #3

^{*} Land is yet to be handed over by State Govt, will be constructed once the State Govt hand over the land
^{**} Under Construction
^{***}Planned to consider after the utilization of the terminals already constructed

== Cost ==
With respect to freight rates, waterways are always cheaper than roadways and cheaper than most of the base classes in railways.

== Challenges and potential ==
Many of Kerala's export-based industries that use Kochi port to route their shipments can grow considerably if they tap the potential of the State's inland water transport system. Kochi port is connected to Kerala's hinterland through inland waterways which run virtually parallel to the Arabian Sea and link major trading centres. Future potentiality of business improves with improvements in external and internal factors. International Container Trans-shipment Terminal (ICTT) at Vallarpadam at Cochin Coast is one of such external factor which will create lot of future potential for IWAI in Kerala. The expectations from ICTT are to attract more international cargo movement through India and to reduce the freight cost of India's international trade. IWAI has already taken steps to utilize such opportunity. Two special terminals, which support the interchange of containers by LO-LO (Lift On, Lift Off) and RO-RO (Roll On, Roll Off) barges, are constructed on NW3, near Kochi port. Traffic will, in all likelihood, come to a halt in Kochi when hundreds of container-laden lorries take to the city roads and highways when the Vallarpadam container transhipment terminal becomes functional. Presuming that a container will be loaded and another one unloaded every minute, 2,880 lorries will pass through Kochi's highways daily. It is proposed to be given to transport the containers in vessels passing through the National Waterway III," he said. A number of industrial plants on the banks of Udyogamandal Canal, where the public sector FACT and Travancore Cochin Chemicals (TCC) are located. Though waterways are the cheapest, safest and most eco-friendly mode of transport, many of the navigable canals in Kochi are now being used to dump waste from households, shops and markets. Many houses and businesses have encroached on these canals, narrowing them. Bridges such as the one at Kaloor are low-level, hampering the safe passage of boats. This calls for concerted efforts by agencies such as the Inland Waterways Authority of India, the KSINC and the Irrigation and Fisheries departments.

Future development The studies called for extension of NW-3 from Kottapuram to Hosdurg in Kasargodu and from Kollam to Kovalam. Linkages to Velloor via Muvattupuzha river for 25 km and from Muhamma to the eastern bank of Vembanadu lake to Kumarakom and Nattakom also have been suggested. From Alapuzha, it is suggested to Nedumudy, Pulinkunnu, Chambakulam, Edathua and Parumala. The National Bank for Agriculture and Rural Development had approved a proposal for the development of the canal in the Mahe-Vatakara stretch. The IND engineers said that the Mahe-Vatakara canal was being developed with facilities required for national waterway standards. The canal would have a bottom width of 32 metres, they added. The Valapattanam-Mahe stretch is the missing link and a major obstacle to the inland navigation potential of the region. IND engineers said here that the survey for an estimated 58-km stretch was to finalise the alignment of the canal.

== Photo gallery ==
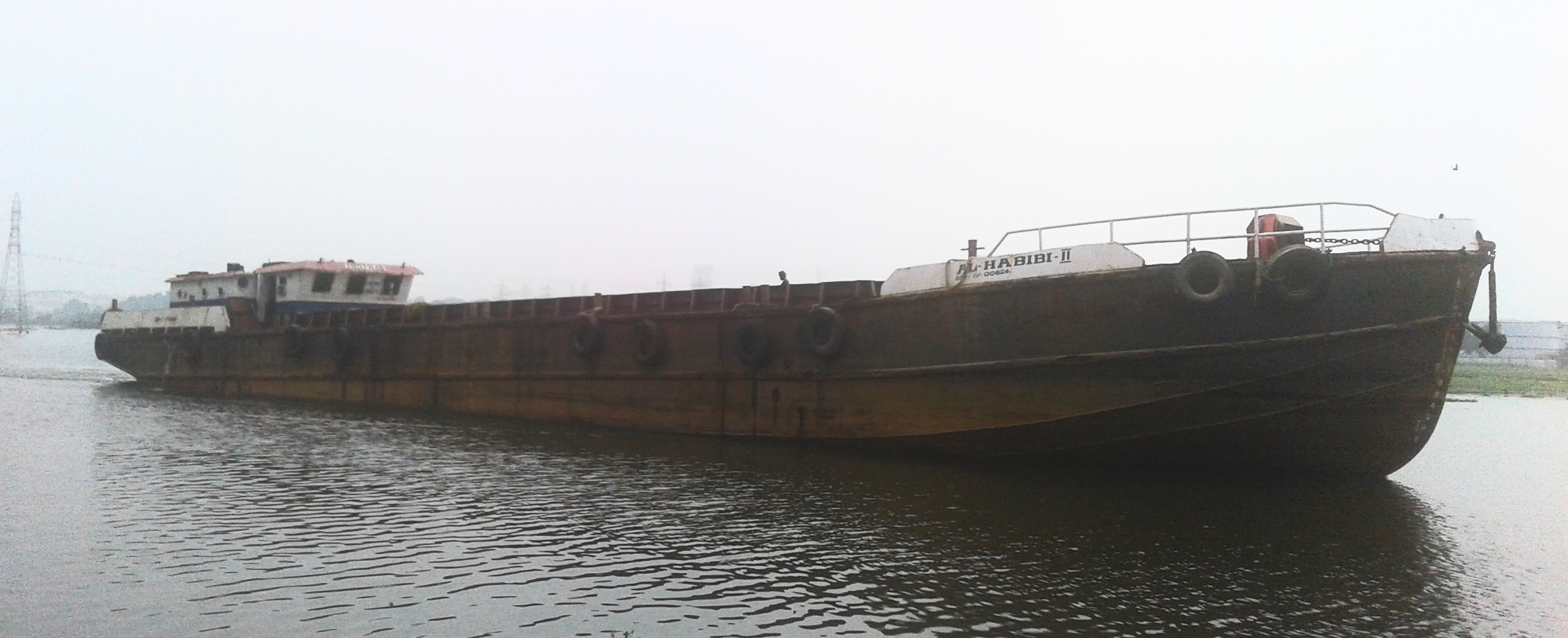
A barge in NW 3

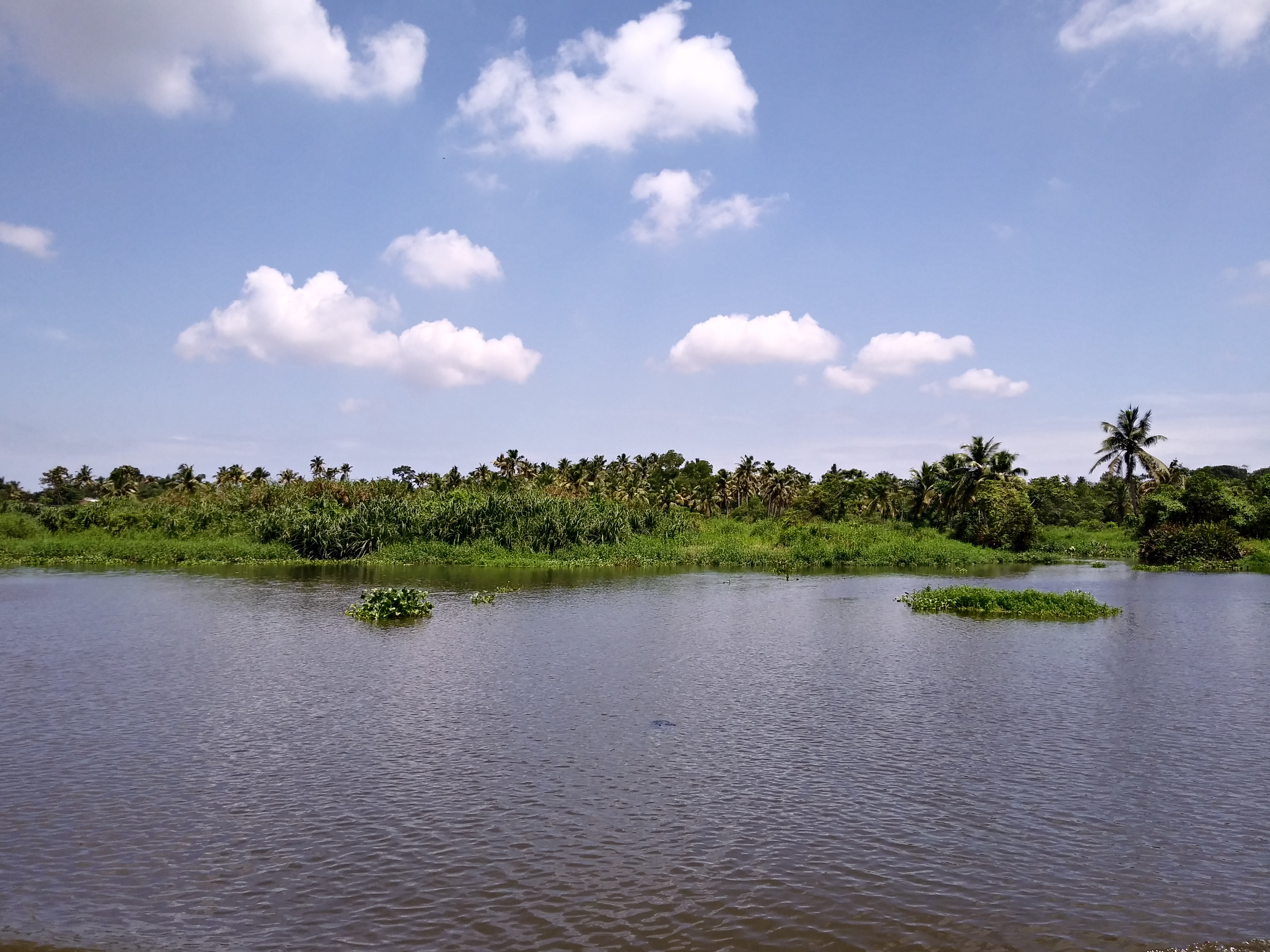
View from NW 3

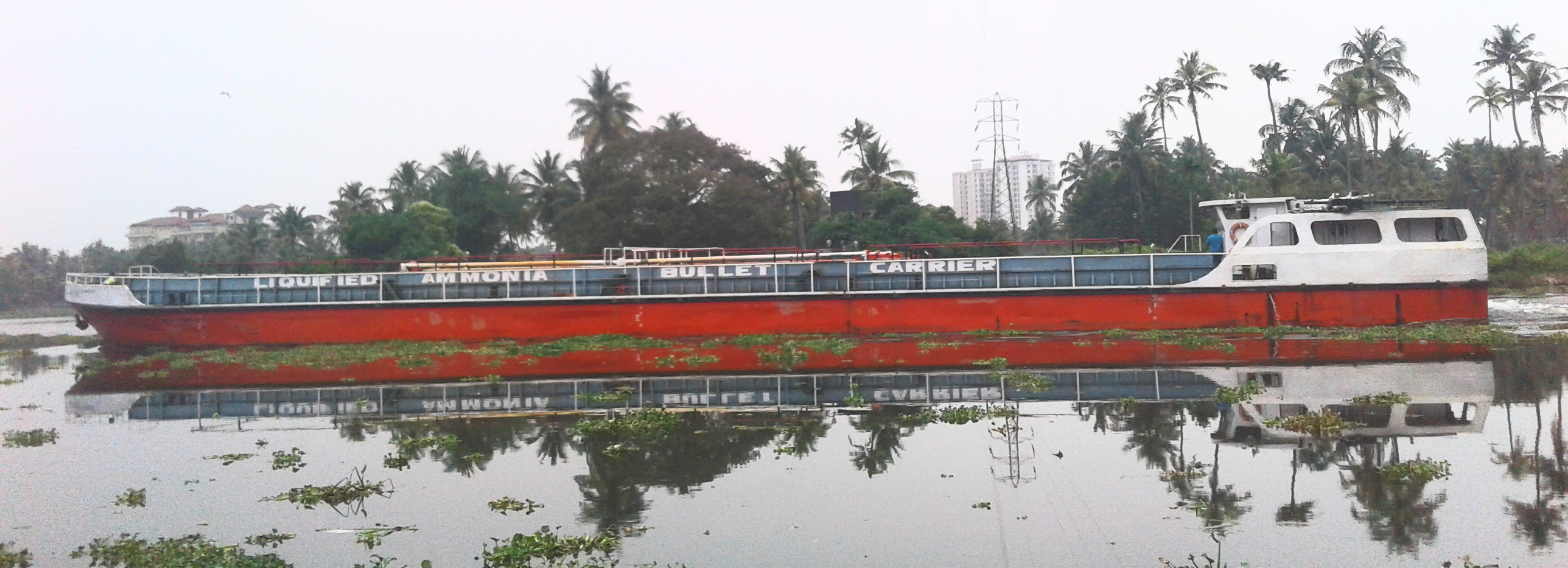
Liquified ammonia barge in NW 3

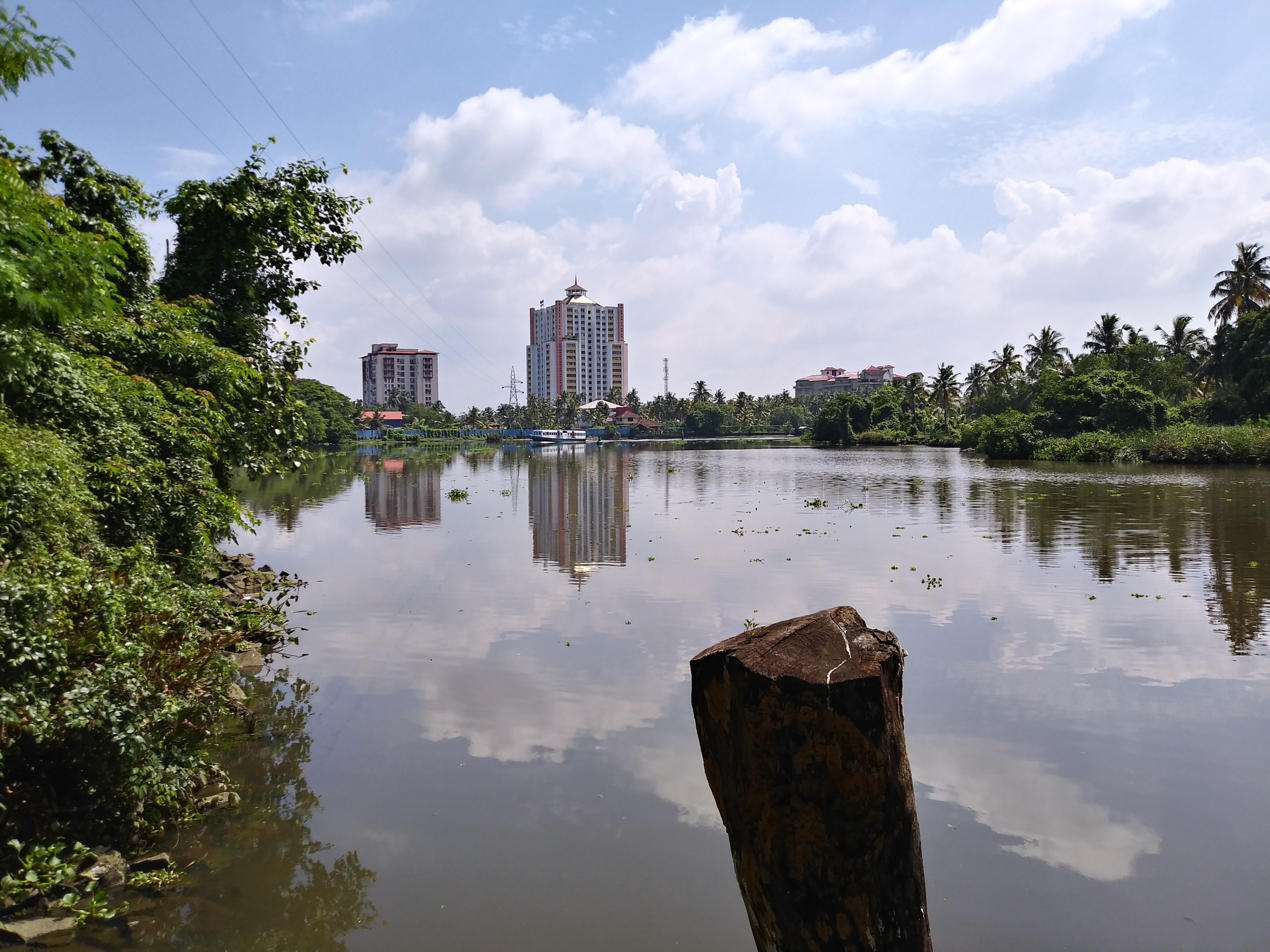
View of NW 3 from Vyttila

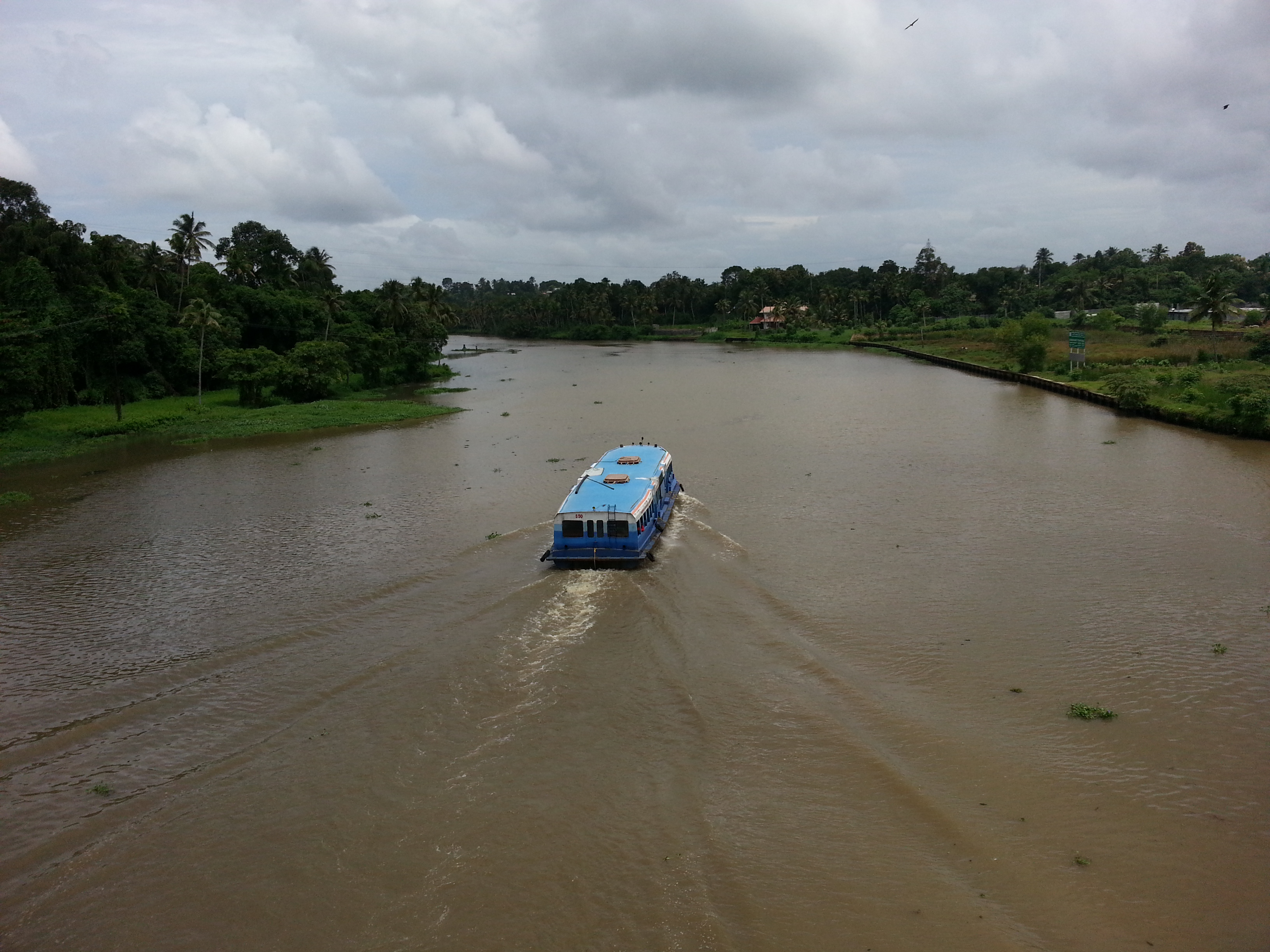
Public transport in NW 3

== See also ==
- Inland Waterways Authority of India
- Waterways transport in Kerala
- Thiruvananthapuram–Shoranur canal
- Conolly Canal
- Varkala Tunnel
