= Manjaly =

Coordinates: 10.1666°N 76.2166°E

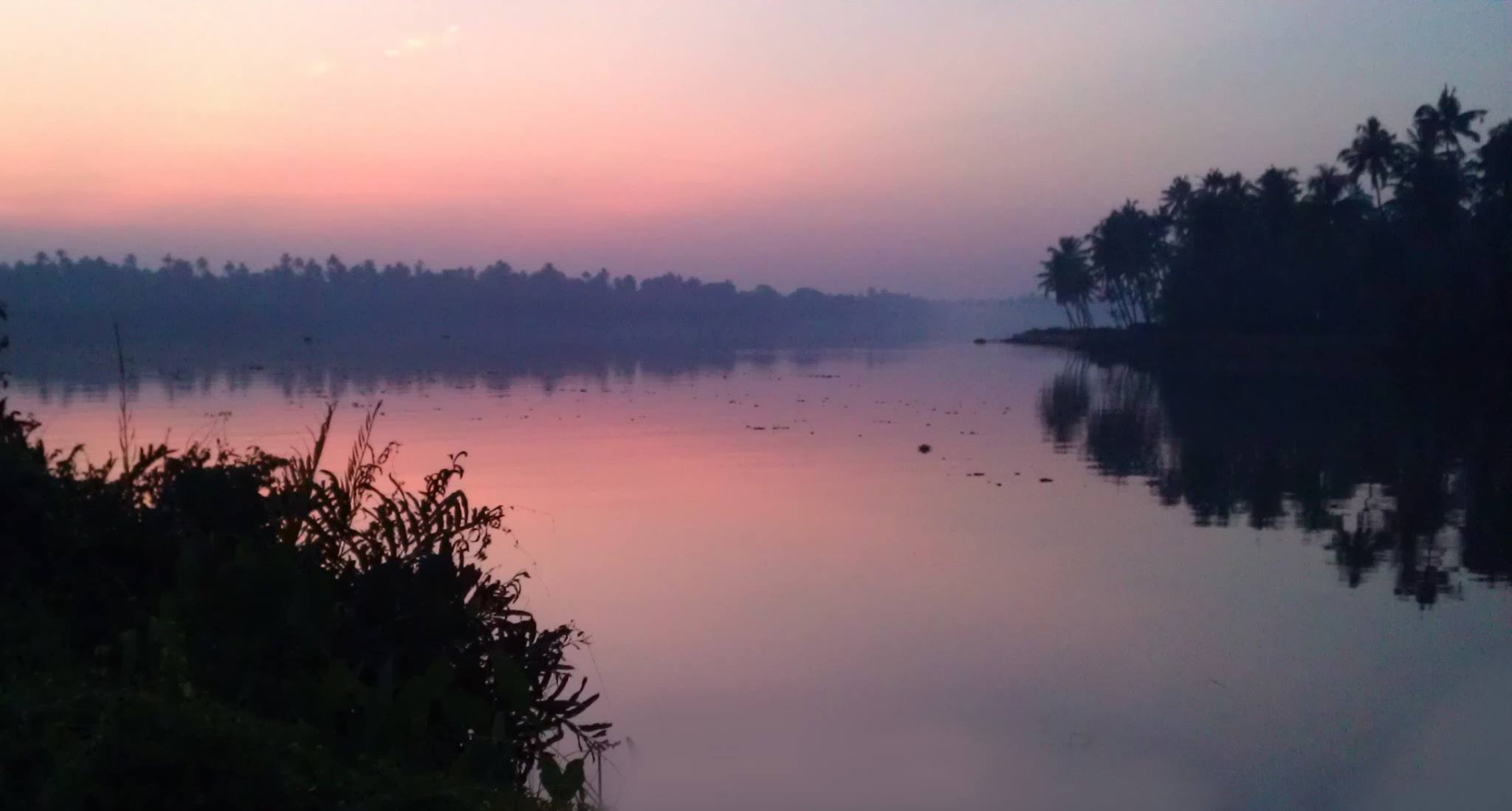
Manjaly

Manjali is a small town in Ernakulam district, Kerala, India situated near North Paravur.

The Manjaly is also famous for Halva and Biryani. Manjali is very close to the confluence point of Chalakudy River with Periyar River.

== Manjaly Canal ==
The Manjaly canal or river which is part of the National Waterways syatem and is a stream that flows from Angamaly to Manjali parallel to Chalakudy Puzha. This was a prominent waterways in past and it was formed after a floods in 16th century which changed course of the Chalakudy River.

== See also ==
- Chendamangalam
- Kadamakkudy Islands
