= Thiruvananthapuram–Shoranur canal =

Canal in India

The Thiruvananthapuram - Shoranur canal is a historic canal in India, from Trivandrum to Shoranur (Palakkad district). It was one of the most arterial transportation mode in erstwhile Travancore princely state. Most of the trade, commerce and freight traffic in Travancore used to happen through this canal. The canal used to pass through rice bowl of the state, Kuttanad, centre of Coir trade i.e. Alappuzha, centre of Cashew business, Kollam, Changanassery market, strategic Thevally, Kayamkulam, Varkala etc. and used to connect Thiruvithamkoor with Cochin State and Malabar.

== History ==
The T S canal was commissioned in stages under the three erstwhile states of Travancore, Cochin and Madras between the 18th and 19th century. The portion between Channankara and Thiruvananthapuram was first done to effect through-traffic from Varkala to Thiruvananthapuram. Then, Paravur canal was constructed to link the backwaters of Paravur Lake and Edava Kayal. Quilon canal came next, connecting Paravur Lake and Ashtamudi Kayal. Thus, the waterway route in this region was completed by 1880 to have through movement of goods and passenger traffic between the southern parts of Travancore parts of the state.

== Course ==
The total route length of TS Canal is almost 420 km. However at present this entire stretch is not completely navigable.

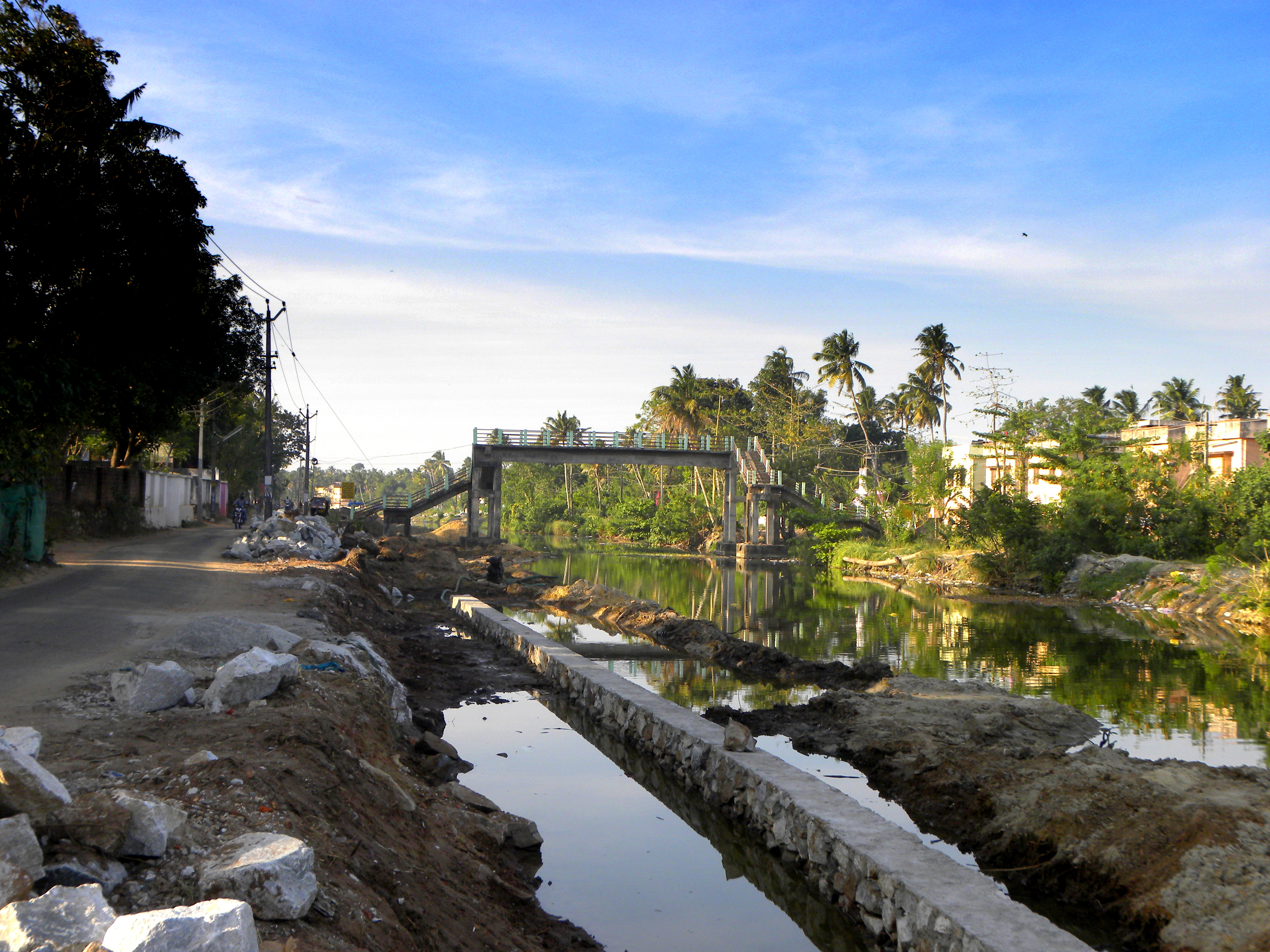
Quilon Canal, part of National Waterway 3

- Kovalam - Kollam reach - 79 km comprising,
  - Kovalam to Vallakkadavu 11 km
  - Vallakkadavu to Akkulam 7.5 km through TRV
  - Akkulam lake to Kadinamkulam lake is 11.5 km
  - Kadinamkulam lake to Kozhithottam lake 15.2 km
  - Kozhithottam lake to Nadayara lake 12.8 km with 1 km Varkala Tunnel.
  - Nadayara lake to Paravur lake 8.3 km
  - Paravur lake to Kollam is 12.7-km through Kollam Thodu
- National Waterway 3
  - comprising Kollam - Kottapuram- 205 km and
  - Kodungallur - Ponnani reach of Conolly Canal - 85 km.
- Bharathapuzha from Ponnani to Shoranur - 54 km - this stretch is not at all in a navigable condition at present. There is very little water flow in Bharathappuzha due to 11 reservoirs in its upper basin and vast tracts of its upper basin in Palakkad Gap and beyond are semi-arid. There was also incessant sand mining in the river basin, which destroyed the quality of the river bed for navigation purpose.

== Present status ==
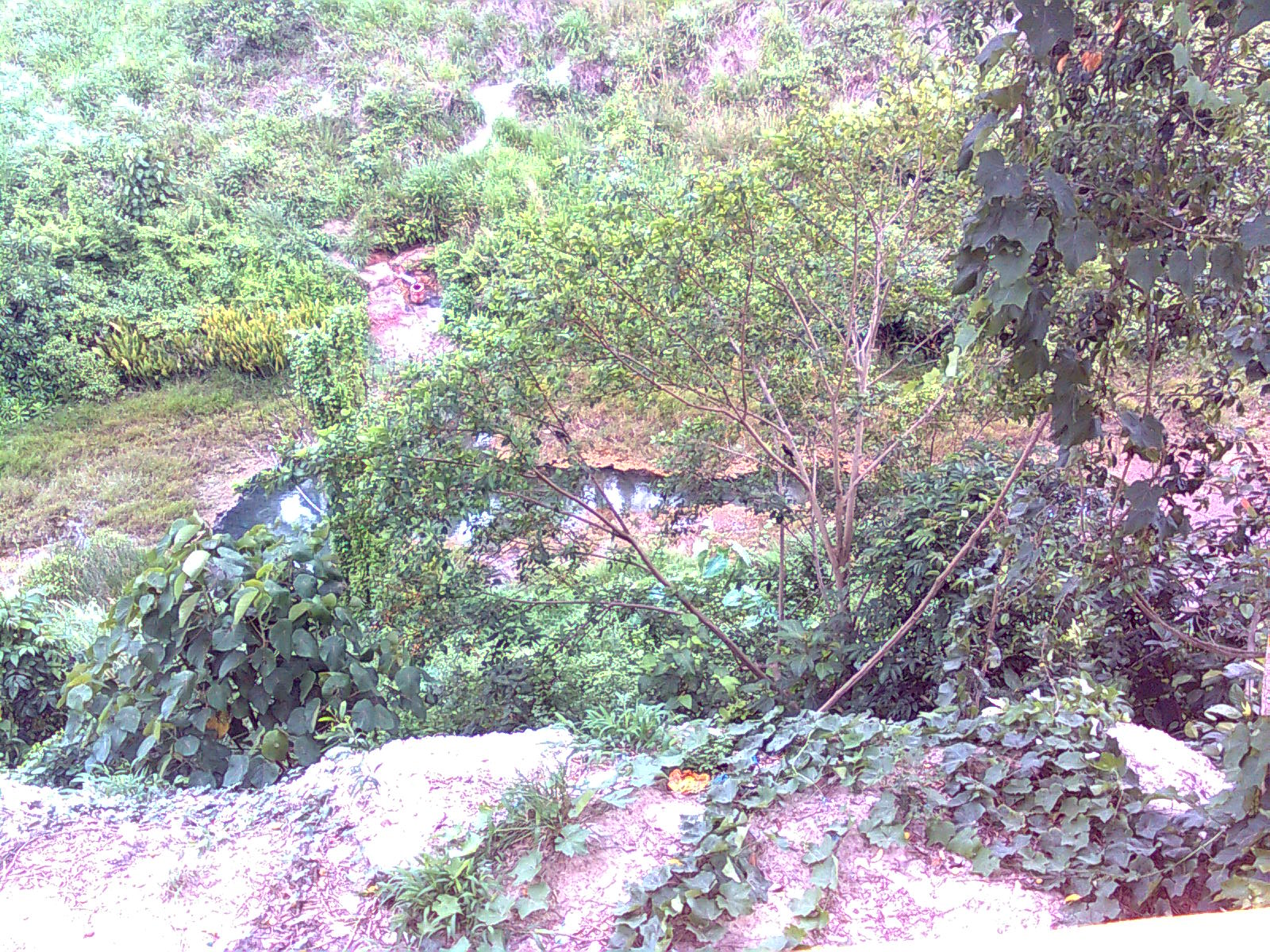
T S canal

Currently the canal is largely unused because of,

- Poor quality of channel due to - siltation, encroachments, dumping of waste and sewage, unscientific constructions, low cross structures and shallow depths have prevented its use for navigation.
- Development of faster alternatives - railway lines and roadways.

Marginal utilisation is there for tourism and passenger transportation in Kollam, Alappuzha, Kottayam and Kochi at present.

In 2005 National Transportation Planning and Research Centre prepared a Rs. 9.2 Crore project to revive the 60.5 km long Kovalam - Kollam stretch of the canal.

There is huge development planned and undertaken on Kollam - Ponnani stretch of the canal as part of development of National Waterway 3 as part of larger 630 km West Coast Canal (WCC) Project between Kovalam and Bekal.

There is also renovation happening on Parvathi Puthanaar reach of canal by KWIL and cleaning of Varkala Tunnel's Chilakkoor passage by Government of Kerala. Now, of the 74.18-km waterway from Kovalam to Kollam, only 27.5 km are navigable and 11.3 km partially navigable.

== See also ==
- Waterways transport in Kerala
- AVM Canal
- Canoli Canal
- Varkala Tunnel
