= Kottayam Port =

Kottayam Port and Container Terminal (KPCT) promoted by KINFRA and key members of The South Indian Chamber of Commerce and Industry, Kottayam, is the first minor port and Inland Container Depot (ICD) using Inland waterways Kerala state, situated in Nattakom, on the banks of Kodoor river in National Waterway 9. This is also India's first port and ICD to use inland waterway with Customs notified area for Exports & Imports. The port integrates multi-mode freight traffic between Kochi Port and a vast hinterland of Kottayam district, Pathanamthitta district and Idukki district. This is a gateway port for Kottayam.

It is connected to Cochin Port by road and by an inland waterway through Vembanadu Lake at a distance of 85 Kilometers. The operation of port is based on multimodal transportation concept. The containers sealed by customs are shipped to stack points at Cochin Port using barge. The port is situated approximately 5 km south of Kottayam town and 1.5 km west of Main Central Road.

== History ==
KPCT is a Company promoted by the key members of The South Indian chamber of Commerce and Industry,(SICCI) Kottayam and KINFRA 49 per cent stake held by the Kinfra and the rest 51 per cent by the industry, NRIs and others. The construction of dry port commenced in 2006 and the port was inaugurated on 17 August 2009 by Minister for Industries, Kerala Government Shri. Elamaram Kareem. The port remained inactive for next four years and the barge at port that was lying idle was rented to Travancore Cements. In January 2013 the port officially received mini port status till then it was called Kottayam Depot or dry dock. In November 2016 after receiving back the rented barge trial run was conducted with it by carrying 6 Trans Asia containers between Kochi port and Kottayam. The port received its first container cargo through barge from Kochi on 9 March 2019. The cargo contained consignments of TJP Rubber Industries and Diamond Flour Mills based at Kottayam.

It is estimated that during the financial year 2018- 19, Kottayam port handled around 1737 TEU ( 20-foot Equivalent Unit) containers and collected a customs duty of ₹12.93 crore. The foreign exchange earned was ₹21 crore.

== Facilities ==
The port has a capacity to handle barges of 10 TEU. The jetty has berthing facility for barges measuring 50×12 m. It has a 40,000 Sqft Warehouse for export, import and hazardous goods and computerised management of freight. It is situated in a land area of 10 acres. The port has a Reach stacker and customs clearance facility.

== See also ==
- Waterways transport in Kerala
