= Alumkadavu =

Coordinates: 9.059°N 76.507°E

Alumkadavu is a village in Karunagapally of the Kollam district in the Indian state of Kerala. The village is located on the backwaters of Ashtamudi Lake. It is known to be an originator for the construction of Kettuvallam, a type of traditional barge in Kerala characterized by thatched covers.
