= Poovar =

Village in Kerala

- Town
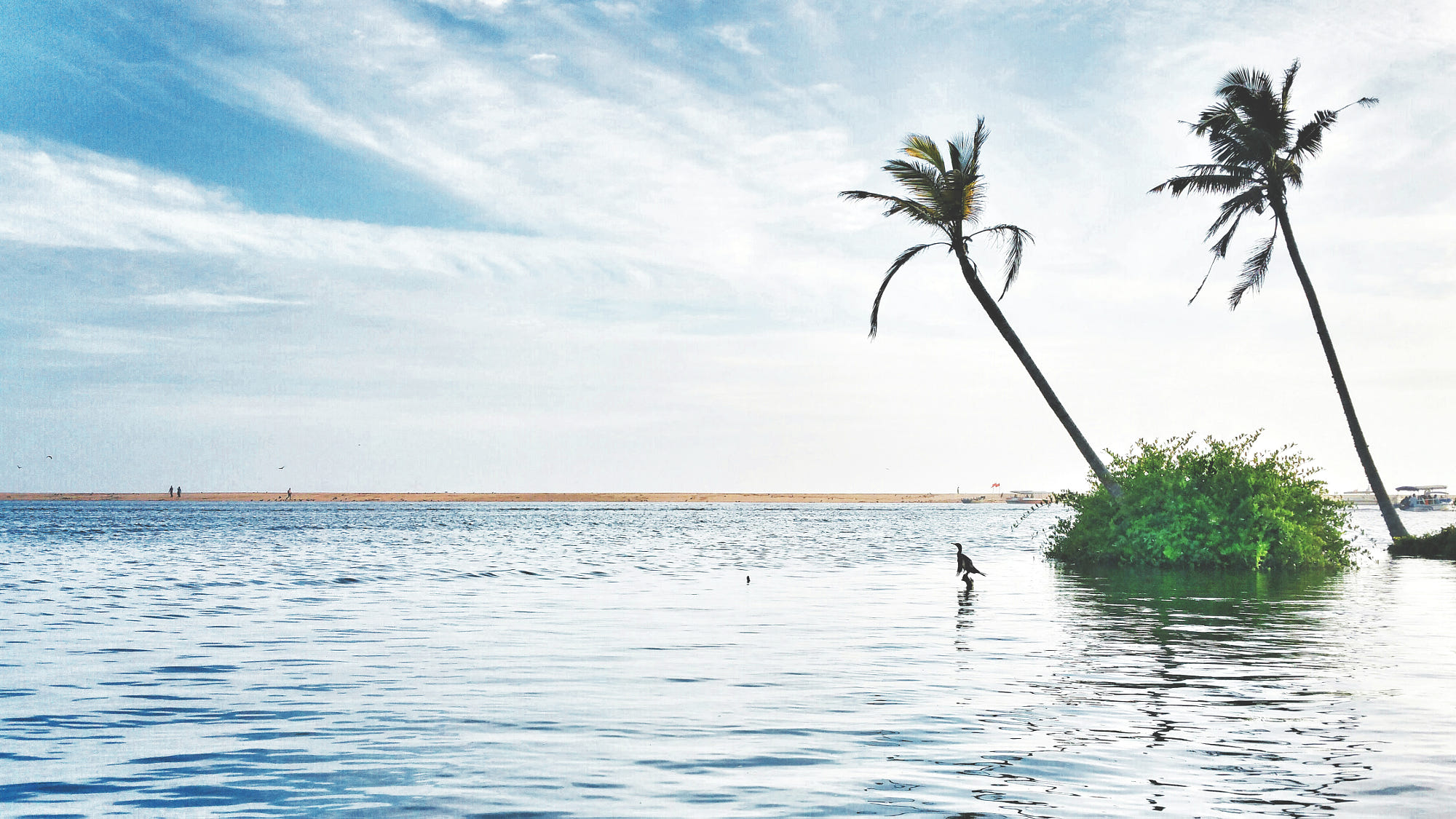
- Poovar beach

- Location in Kerala, India Poovar (India)
- Coordinates: 8°19′3″N 77°4′17″E
- Country: India
- State: Kerala
- District: Thiruvananthapuram

Languages
  - Official: Malayalam, English
- Time zone: UTC+5:30 (IST)
- Vehicle registration: KL-20

Poovar is a tourist town in Neyyattinkara (tehsil) in the Thiruvananthapuram district of Kerala state, South India. This village is almost at the southern tip of Thiruvananthapuram while the next village, Pozhiyoor, marks the end of Kerala.

== Geography ==
Poovar lies very close to Vizhinjam, a natural harbour. The beach of Pozhiyoor, named Pozhikkara is located near Poovar. The 56 km Neyyar River passes through Neyyattinkara Taluk into the Arabian Sea near Poovar.

== History ==
Poovar was a trading centre of timber, sandalwood, ivory and spices. It is believed that ships owned by King Solomon of Israel landed in Ophir, which is identified by some sources as Poovar, The village was one of the ancient Muslim settlements along the western coast of India. The central mosque in Poovar was built by Malik Deenar, an eighth century Muslim preacher. During the reign of the Chola dynasty, Poovar was a major port. The explorer Megasthenes, Roman writer Pliny the Elder and Venetian traveller Marco Polo mention connections with Greece and Rome.

The origin of the name "Poovar" has a story related to Marthanda Varma. Before that it was called Pokkumoosapuram. There were a merchant named Pokku Moosa Maraikkar who lived in Poovar during the 18th century in a house called Kallaraickal Tharavad, which many times gave shelter to Marthanda Varma (1706–58), king of Travancore from his enemies.Pokku Moosa Maraikkar is believed to have migrated from Malabar somewhere around Kozhikode for trade and finally settled in Poovar.He is believed to be in the lineage of Kunjali Maraikkars.Poovar also had trade relations with international markets at this time as well as a well trained army and some ships. At the Battle of Colachel and Battle of Kayamkulam the forces of Kallaraickal assisted the Travancore army against the Dutch East India Company during the Travancore–Dutch War.

During internal riots in Travancore and while escaping from the Ettuveetil Pillamar (Lords of the Eight Houses), the king reached Poovar. It was a spring season and the trees on both sides of the Neyyar were full of flowers. These flowers fell into the river making it more attractive. On seeing this pleasant scenery, Marthanda Varma commented that this was poo-var, a conjunction of the Malayalam words for "flower" and "river".

== Transport ==
Poovar is located approximately 30 kilometers from the state capital, Thiruvananthapuram, and 12 kilometers south of Kovalam.

=== Airconnectivity ===
Poovar is located 26km from Trivandrum International Airport

=== Railway ===
Located 12 Km away from Neyyattinkara railway station and 28 km from Trivandrum central Railway station.

=== Road ===
6 km away from NH 66 and 12 away from state highway.The Kerala State Road Transport Corporation (KSRTC) operates regular public bus services connecting Poovar to Thiruvananthapuram and nearby transit hubs such as Neyyattinkara.

== Trivandrum shipyard Poovar ==
Poovar is a location for Trivandrum Shipyard Poovar Project, where large vessels are constructed and repaired. The shipyard's natural depth of 23 meters makes it ideal for this activity. Its strategic location, 10 nautical miles from the international shipping channel and 10 kilometers from the Vizhinjam International Seaport Thiruvananthapuram, facilitates connectivity and global accessibility.
