= Pozhiyoor =

- Location in Kerala, India Pozhiyoor (India)
- Coordinates: 8.300699756015973°N 77.09296345710754°E
- Country: India
- State: Kerala
- District: Thiruvananthapuram
- Established: From ancient era

Languages
  - Official: Malayalam, English
- Time zone: UTC+5:30 (IST)
- PIN: 695513
- Telephone code: 0471-221
- Vehicle registration: KL-19
- Nearest city: Thiruvananthapuram
- Lok Sabha constituency: Thiruvananthapuram
- Climate: moderate climate (Köppen)

Pozhiyoor is a village in the district of Thiruvananthapuram in the State of Kerala in India. It has gradually grown to a well known tourist destination in India. The major attractions of Poovar tourism area are in Pozhiyoor. Pozhikkara, estuary formed by river Neyyar before it falls into the mighty Arabian Sea is the centre of attraction of tourism circuit in Poovar. Golden Beach, Elephant Rock, Anantha Victoria Marthanda Varma Canal, Pieta are other major attractions in Pozhiyoor Beach area in Thiruvananthapuram. It is at the coastal border of the Indian states of Kerala and Tamil Nadu.

== History ==
The history of Pozhiyoor traces to the ancient ages. Pozhiyoor had an ancient port at the present golden sand beach at Pozhikkara and was a major trading centre on those days, around 1000 BC, period of David and Solomon. Pozhiyoor was an ancient trading centre of timber, sandal wood, ivory, spices and other important goods of that era. It is believed that the ships of Solomon landed in the port and conducted trade with this part of world. Ancient day name of Pozhiyoor was Ophir, which is mentioned in the Bible (1Kings 10:11).

Pozhiyoor and Poovar had witnessed early settlement of Muslims from Arabia. It is believed that the mosque in Poovar was founded by Malik Dinar, an early Muslim preacher came to Kerala for spreading the new faith.

Pozhiyoor was a thriving port in early days during the golden period of Greece and Roman Empire. As new centres like Muzirus and Kozhikode got emerged as the major trading centres, Pozhiyoor lost its glory.

== Administration ==
Nation - India
State - Kerala
District - Thiruvananthapuram
Taluk - Neyyattinkara
Pozhiyoor falls into Kulathoor Grama Panchayat and Karode Panchayat of Parassala Block in Thiruvananthapuram District. Pozhiyoor is divided into Pozhikkara, Parithiyoor, South Kollemcode, Poipallivilakam.

== Location ==
Pozhiyoor is near several other tourist destinations such as Kovalam, Poovar and Padmanabhapuram Palace. It has an estuary which connects with the sea during high tides. The Pozhikkara beach is located in Pozhiyoor, where the Neyyar, Southern Peninsular river joins at the Arabian Sea.

Pozhiyoor is about 36 km from Thiruvananthapuram International Airport and 34 km from Central Railway Station and Bus Station. The nearest railway stations are Neyyattinkara and Parassala. The nearest bus stand is at Poovar just 5 km away.

From Pozhiyoor which mark the end of South Kerala lease the first village, Neerody of Tamil Nadu which is just 2.5 km, by Parssala Kollengode Road.

== Religion ==
The three main religious communities in Pozhiyoor are Christian, Hindu, and Muslim. There are two churches, two mosques (one Juma Masjid other one Town Masjid) and a major Hindu temple with a subdivision. Two major churches, St. Mathew's Church, South Kollemcode and St. Mary Magdalene Church, Paruthiyoor are under the Latin Catholic Archdiocese of Trivandrum / Archdiocese of Trivandrum (Latin Rite). There is an ancient Shiva/Siva temple, Sri Mahadeva Temple Pozhiyoor, which is administered by Travancore Devaswom Board. There is a reference about this temple in Vellayani Sasanam availed from Vellayani Lake, Thiruvananthapuram. A notable Devi temple Kollemcode Thookapura is located 2 km from Pozhiyoor.

== Tourism ==
Pozhiyoor's beach attracts many tourists every year. It is also a natural resourced area with boating facilities and backwater tourism. Isola Di Cocco Beach Resort, Estuary Island, Poovar Island, Over The Hill, Havelia Island Resort...etc. are few of the resorts in and around Pozhiyoor Pozhikkara. Affordable boating services are available from both Poovar & Pozhiyoor. Pozhiyoor is also known to witness bioluminescence. On certain days, the bioluminescence phenomenon can be seen. Pozhiyoor is renowned as one of the top party destinations in Kerala, celebrated for its Christmas and New Year parties, accompanied by lively DJs.

== Sports ==
Pozhiyoor is well known for its sports enthusiasm and spirit, and is popularly known as the 'Football Capital' of Kerala. Pozhiyoor is also known as the Santhosh Trophy Village. Both SMRC (a Trivandrum District Super Division Qualified Soccer Club) and Udhaya made a vital role to encourage and develop football in the region. It also has contributed many football players to national and state teams. In 2017 Santosh Trophy Tournament, Pozhiyoor was the only village to contribute 10 players representing different teams across India. Two players have played in the 2018–19 I-League season. S. Rajesh for Gokulam FC and Britto PM for Mohun Bagan.Football takes center stage as the main sports event in Pozhiyoor, with at least one sports person hailing from every family. Moreover, Pozhiyoor also boasts the development of national-level players in diverse sports such as Badminton, Basketball, and Cricket.

== Anantha Victoria Marthandam Canal ==
The Anantha Victoria Marthandam Canal also known as AVM Canal was formed in July 1860 during the reign of Uthradam Thirunal Marthanda Varma Maharaja of Travancore state. It was a scheme for connecting Thiruvananthapuram with Kanyakumari and thus extending the water communications to the extreme south of the country. All the coastal villages numbering more than 20, including, Pozhiyoor, Marthandamthurai, Thengapagttinam, Colachel, and Mondaicadu, all depended upon this resource for most of their needs, including navigation, but today the purpose is no longer served.

== Major establishments and institutions ==
=== Educational institutions ===
- St. Mathew's High School
- Government Upper Primary School
- St.Mary's LP School
- St. Mathew's English Medium School
- Noorul Huda English Medium School

=== Banks and financial institutions ===
- State Bank of India
- Thiruvananthapuram District Cooperative Bank (Pozhiyoor Branch)
- Muthoot Finance (Pozhiyoor Branch)

=== Government institutions ===
- Government Hospital Pozhiyoor
- Indian Postal Service Pozhiyoor (Pin Code - 695513)
- Police Station Pozhiyoor
- Matsyafed
- Matsya Bhavan
- Rajiv Gandhi Centre for Aquaculture (Govt. of India)
