= Colachel Seaport =

Colachel International Seaport குளச்சல் சர்வதேச துறைமுகம்
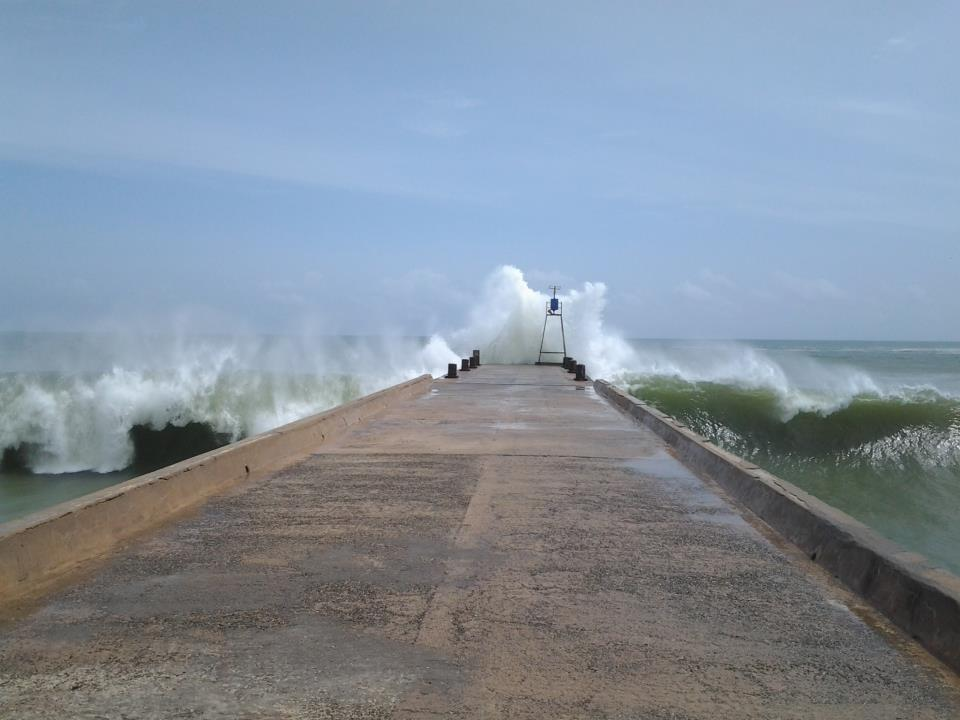
- Old Colochel harbour
- Interactive map of Colachel International Seaport குளச்சல் சர்வதேச துறைமுகம்
- Location within India

Location
- Country: India
- Location: Colachel
- Coordinates: 8.17°N 77.24°E

Details
- Operated by: Tamil Nadu Maritime Board

Statistics
- Website www.tnmaritime.com/goverment_ports.php?port=7

The Colachel International Seaport also known as Kanyakumari Transshipment Port, is proposed and located in Colachel, Kanyakumari district, Tamil Nadu, India into a major port transforming it into India's southern trans-shipment gateway. The project costs Rs 28000 crore. 500 acres of land will be reclaimed from the sea. This will be taken up in three phases. Colachel is already a natural harbour with water that is about 20 metres deep. The proposed port is less than four nautical miles away from the international shipping channel. The Colachel port would have the ability to handle around two million metric tonnes of cargo initially, which would gradually be enhanced to eight million metric tonnes.

== History ==
It is an ancient port town. Vasco da Gama called it 'Colachi'. Tamil Nadu, as early as the 3rd century BCE, had more than 16 such ports — between Chennai and Tirunelveli — that helped it maintain direct maritime links with China and Southeast Asian countries. Before the State re-organisation in 1956, it was part of the Travancore State. After the defeat of the Dutch by King Anizham Thirunal Marthanda Varma in 1741, a victory pillar had been erected near the beach in commemoration of the victory. The town is bounded on the south by the Arabian Sea.

== Battle of Colachel ==
Colachel was the location of the battle between the Travancore (Anglicised form of Thiruvithaamkoor) forces led by King Marthanda Varma (1729–1758) and the Dutch East India Company forces led by Admiral Eustachius De Lannoy on 10 August 1741. It was the first time in Indian history that a small kingdom defeated a European naval force. The Dutch marines landed in Colachel with artillery and captured the land up to Padmanabhapuram, the then capital of Travancore. The arrival of Marthanda Varma's army led by his General Anandha Padmanaban Nadar from the north forced the Dutch to take up defensive positions in Colachel, where they were attacked and defeated by the Travancore forces. Twenty-eight high level Dutch officers, including Admiral D'lennoy, were captured. The defeat of the Dutch in Colachel was the turning point of the Travancore-Dutch War. D'lennoy went on to serve Marthanda Varma for the next two decades and was promoted to the post of the Valiya kappithan (Senior Admiral) of the Travancore Kingdom.

== Importance ==
The port is proposed at Colachel, 19 km away from Nagercoil, capital of Kanyakumari District. The proposed Colachel International Seaport is just four nautical miles from the International Shipping Lane. Large container ships called mother vessels need about 18 metres of water depth. Colachel is already a natural harbour with water that is about 20 metres deep.

== Estimated project cost ==
Phase-I	₹ 6,628
Phase-II	₹ 6,000
Phase-III	₹ 7,000
Total	₹ 21,000

== See also ==
- Sagar Mala project
