= Neerody =

Neerody நீரோடி
- village
- Location in Tamil Nadu, India Neerody (India)
- Coordinates: 8.291249°N 77.101771°E
- Country: India
- State: Tamil Nadu
- District: Kanyakumari

Population
  - Total: around 100,000

Languages
  - Official: Tamil
- Time zone: UTC+5:30 (IST)
- Postal code: 629160
- Vehicle registration: TN-75

Neerody is a village located at the southernmost coastal tip of the Tamil Nadu state of India. It is bordered by the Arabian Sea, and the A.V.M. Canal. A road cuts the village into two. The principal languages spoken in Neerody are Tamil and Malayalam.
