= Kettuvallam =

Traditional houseboat used in Kerala, India

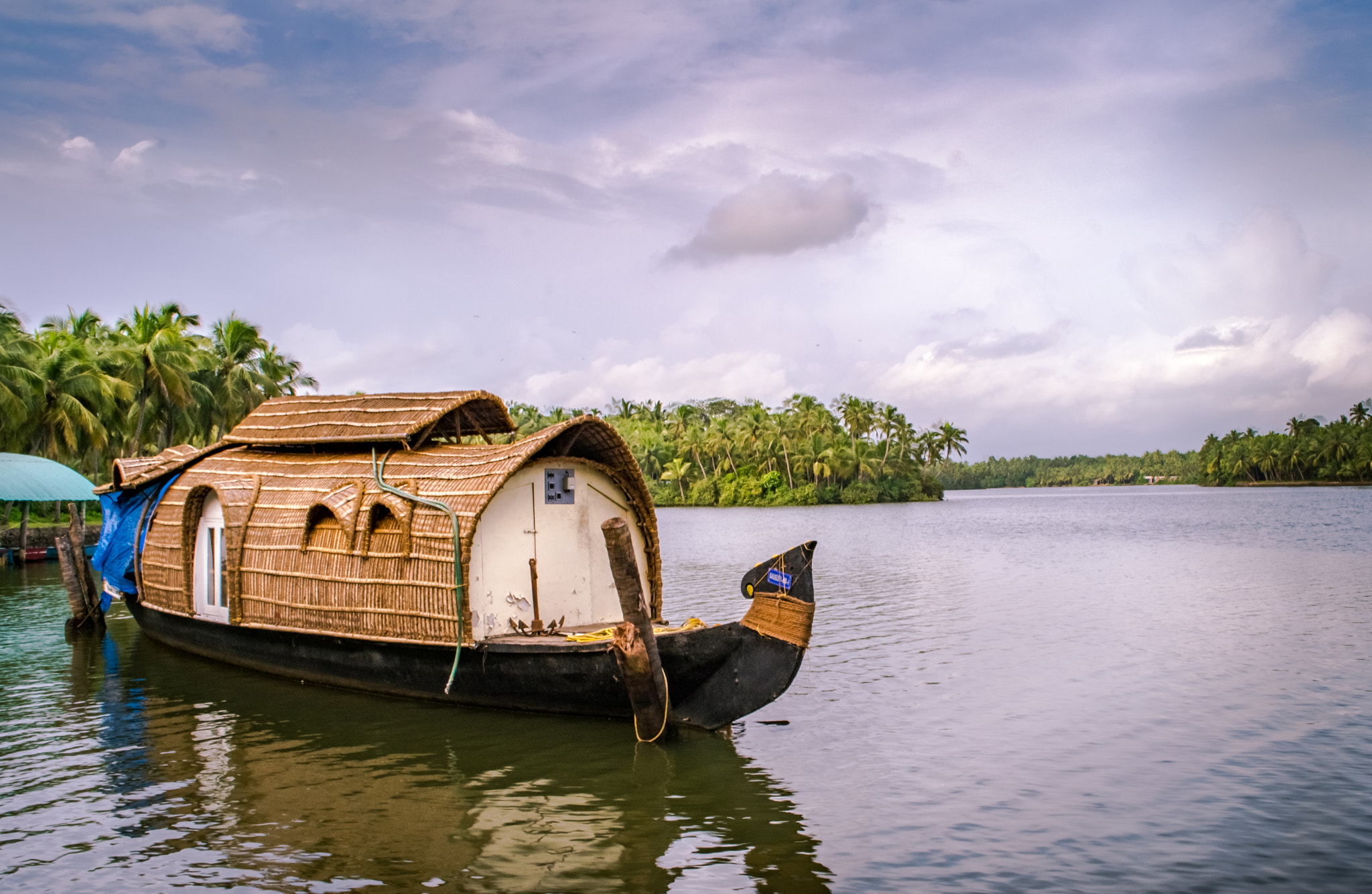
A backwater view with houseboat from Biyyam Lake, Ponnani, India

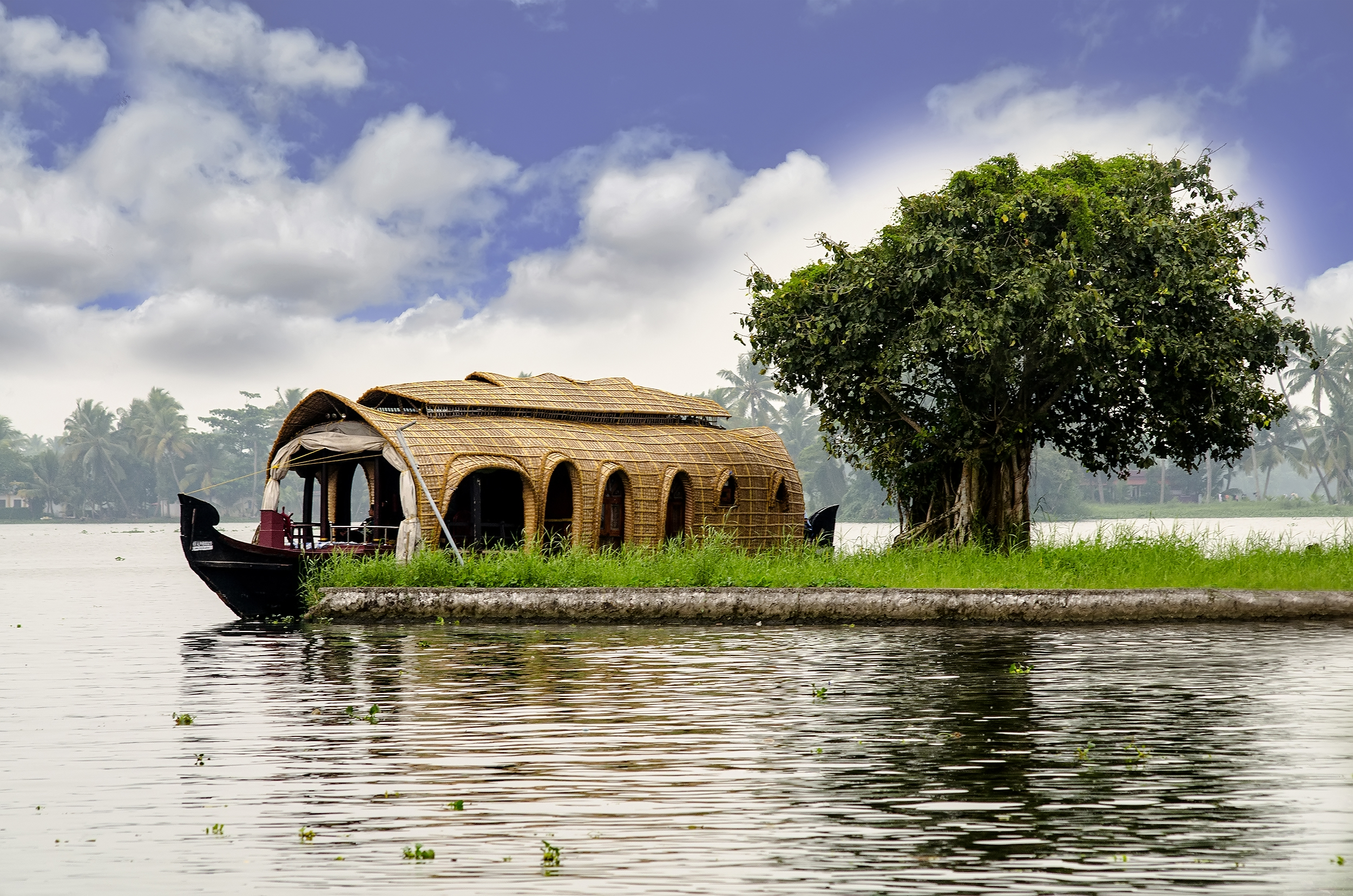
A Kerala houseboat in Alappuzha, India

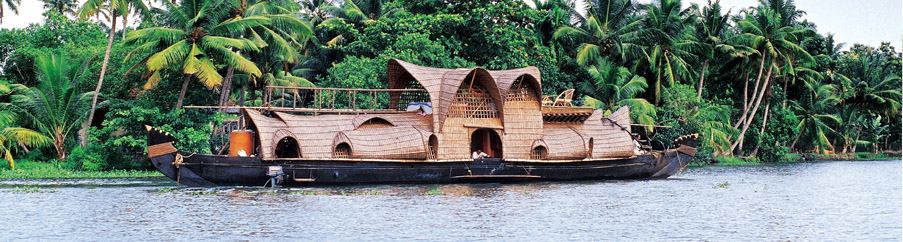
A kettuvallam houseboat with an upper deck

Kettuvallam is a houseboat widely used in the Indian state of Kerala. These have thatched roof covers over wooden hulls. The traditional kettuvallam is mainly used for promoting Kerala tourism.

== History ==
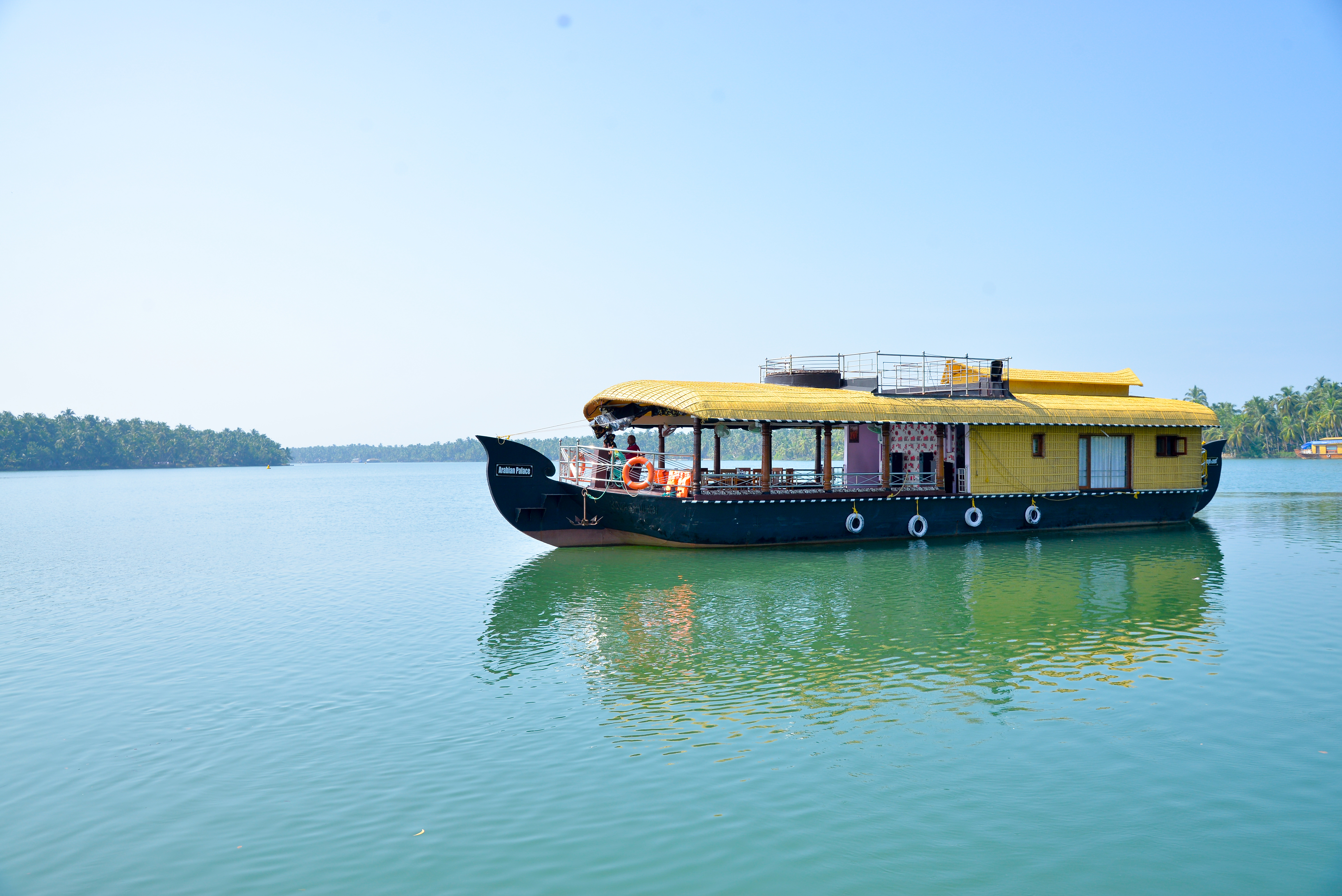
A Kettuvallam at Kavvayi Backwaters, Nileshwaram, Kasaragod

The history of such boats in Kerala goes back to Uru, a large Dhow-type wooden ship made by the carpenters in Beypore, south of Kozhikode port. The teak was taken from Nilambur teak forests in earlier times, but now imported Malaysian teak is used.

Boats in a variety of shapes and sizes have traditionally been the main means of transport of men, women and materials in the Kerala backwaters since the olden days. For the royalty these boats even became comfortable living quarters.

== Construction ==
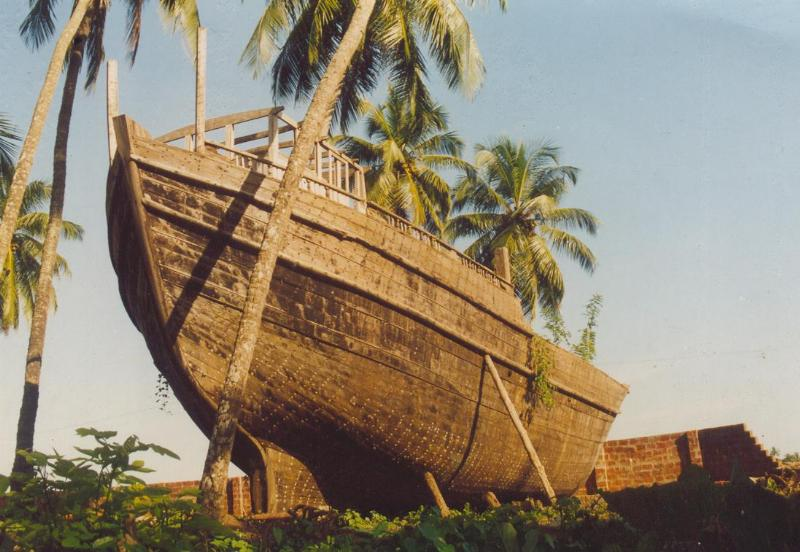
An Uru built at Beypore, Calicut, which is situated on the mouth of the River Chaliyar

A kettuvallam is about 30.5 meters in length and has a width of around 4 meters in the middle. The materials that go into the making are local and ecofriendly; bamboo poles, coconut fibre, ropes, bamboo mats, carpets etc. The main wood used is "Anjili" (Artocarpus hirsuta). There are houseboats with fully furnished single room, double room and triple rooms.

The hull is a series of wooden planks, long cut and carved, tied together using coir with coconut fibers stuffed in between. The kettuvallam is motorised and is steered in deep waters by means of oars. Long bamboo poles or 'punts' are used to propel in shallow areas. Bamboo beams sprouting off on the sides are used as footholds for the same. Bamboo is used for the framework of the roof and splits of bamboo are used for weaving mat for roofing.

Basically the kettuvallam was designed to transport cargo and as such many design changes had to be made to make it a tourist vehicle. The height of the roof was increased to get sufficient headroom. A plank was laid all through the length for ease of walking and comfortable seating, to reduce the disadvantages of the curved shape of the hull. Windows and other openings were provided for light, airflow and view. The entrance is provided in the centre of the linear axis with a top hung panel.

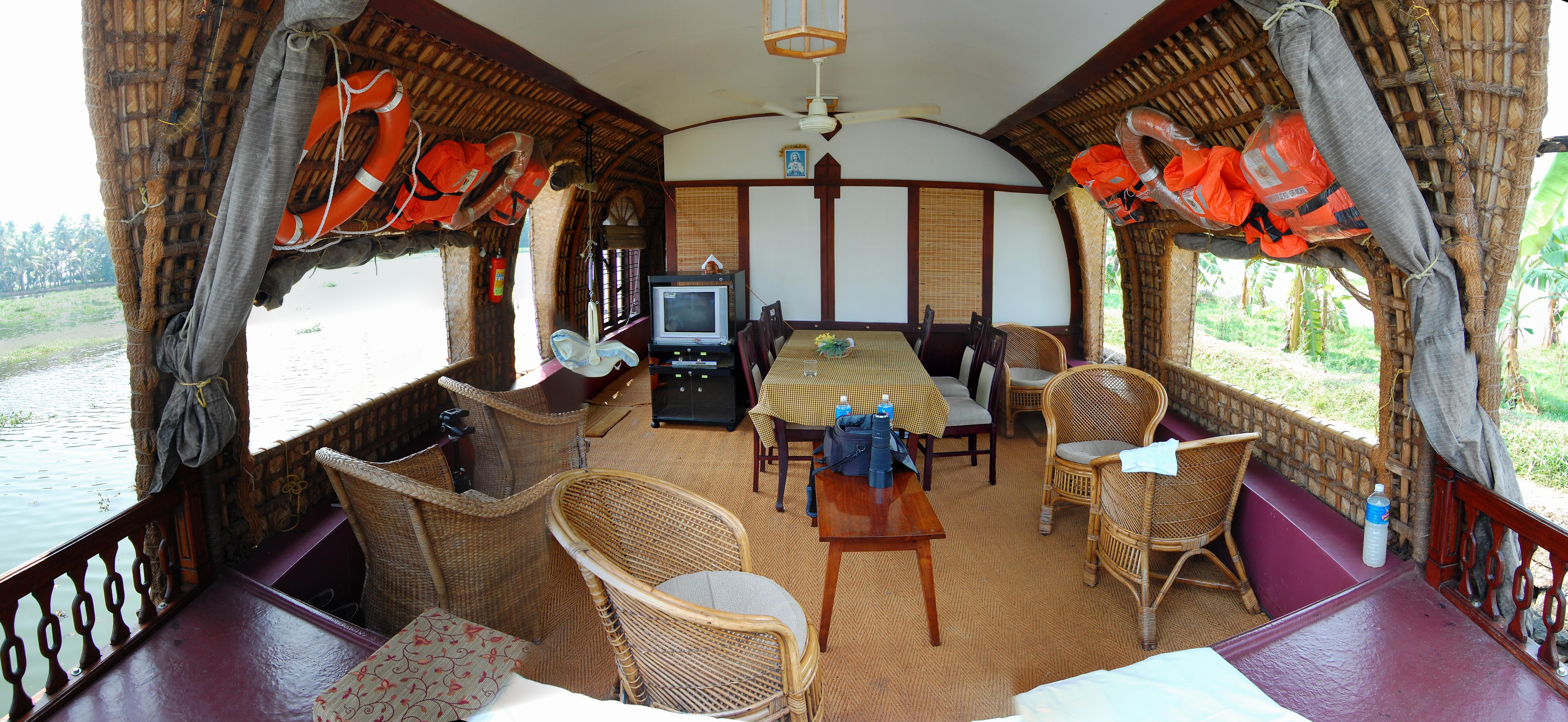
Interior of a Kettuvallam

Most of the latest designs have incorporated three bedrooms with toilets, a living space and kitchen. Of course, there are variations. Some have a lesser number of bedrooms but with a large living space and maybe a deck balcony at the roof level. Normally, the platforms that cantilever from the hull are used as balconies. Innovative changes have been made to accommodate modern fittings. For fixing the toilet seats, shower tray and ceramic floor finish a concrete slab is laid at the floor level. These toilettes are made of steel cabinets with a network of steel meshes on which beneficial bacteria are grown with the help of a catalyst named actizyme. These bacteria feed upon human excreta and produce a harmless germ free colourless byproduct. The soil outlets of the toilet seats are taken through the hull and let out to the flowing water beneath. The use of bio-toilette is common nowadays. Thus the backwater canals are not polluted. The water for use is stored in a plastic tank kept at the top portion of the main body connecting to the kitchen and toilets. The pipes, tank and other synthetic materials are covered with coir or panambu to maintain the aesthetic quality of the eco-friendly materials.

== Tourism ==
Kerala was placed among the '50 destinations of a lifetime' by National Geographic Traveler in a special collectors' issue released just before the turn of the millennium.

The Hindu wrote, "A cruise along the mirror-still lagoons, picture-book lakeside, palm-fringed canals and shimmering rivulets of 'God's Own Country' is the most enchanting holidaying experience in the country. With a cruise along the palm-fringed waterways turning to be part and parcel of holidayers' itinerary, the traditional kettuvallam has emerged as the mascot of Kerala Tourism."

More than 900 kettuvallams ply the backwaters and there are various routes which are popular among the tourists.

Tour operators had been coming out with innovative options. The Kannur District Tourism Council has launched a 'Nadi Darshan' (river viewing) programme in association with a private resort at Kattampalli as an initiative to popularise the kettuvallam for tourism promotion and as effort to let people know more about the Valapattanam River, one of the largest rivers in the region and the life stream of the district.

A seafood eatery has been opened in a kettuvallam on Kaloor- Kadvanthra Road.

== Gallery ==
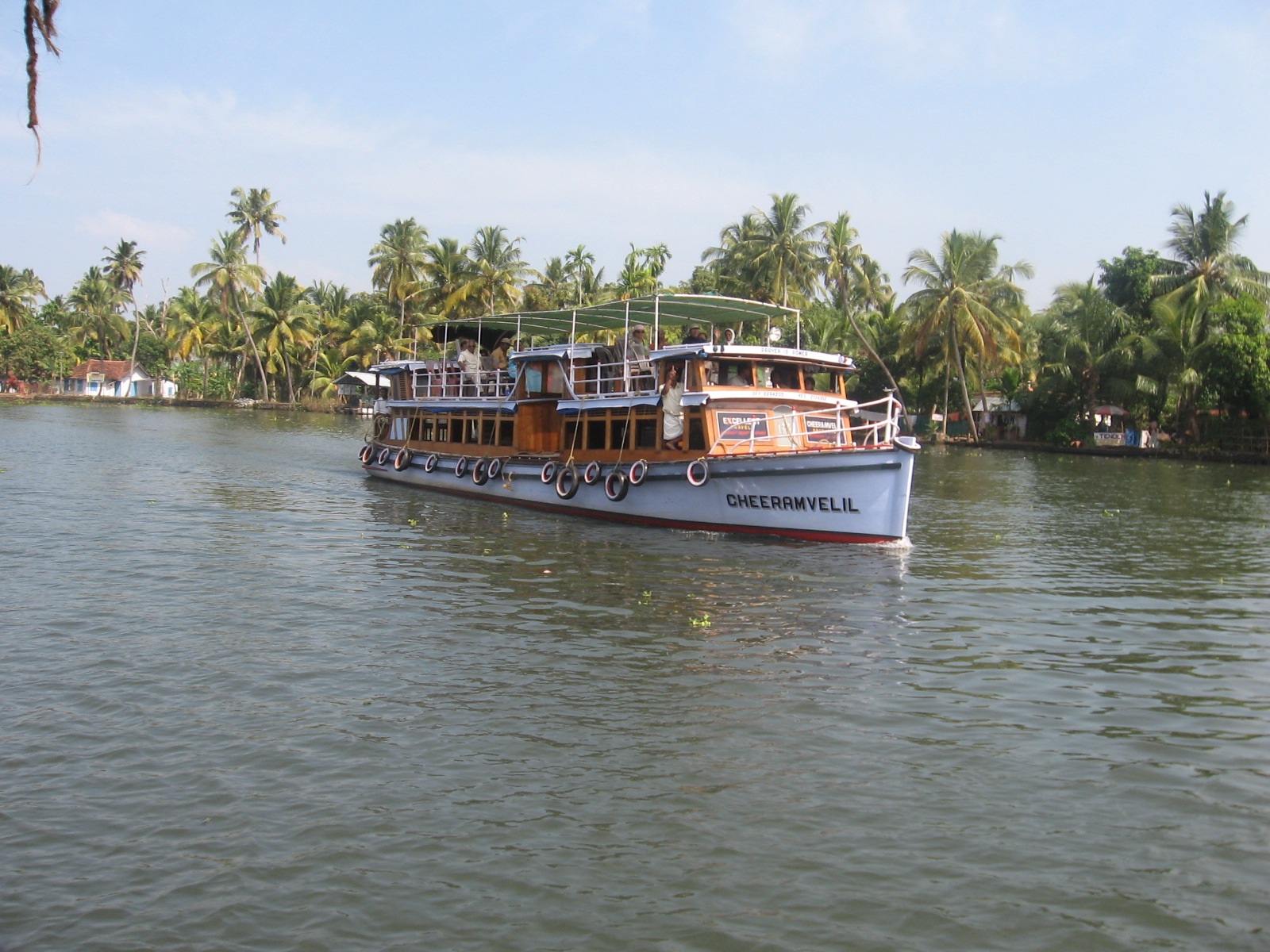
A regular ferry with passengers

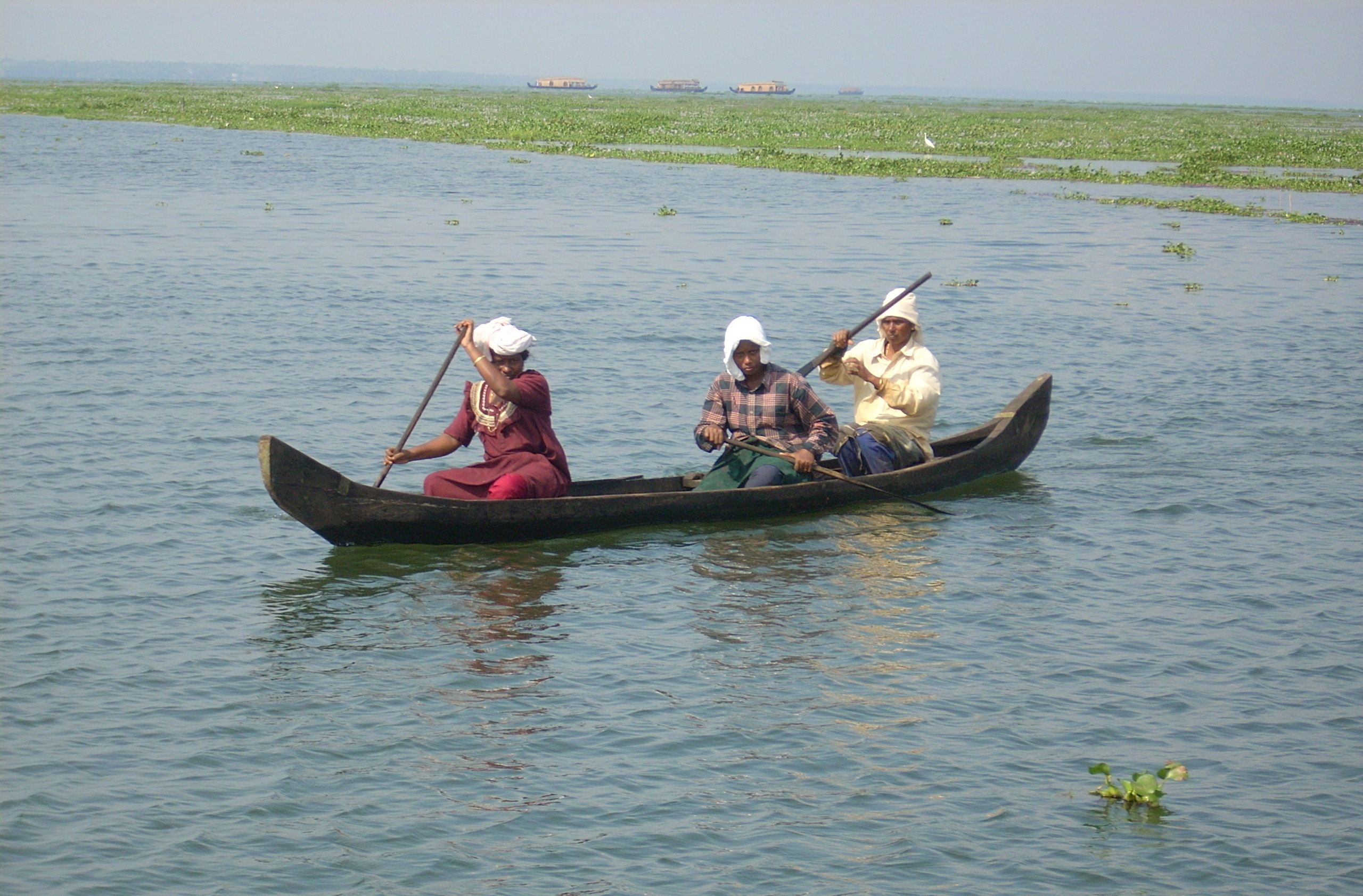
The locals using a boat for fishing and ferry service

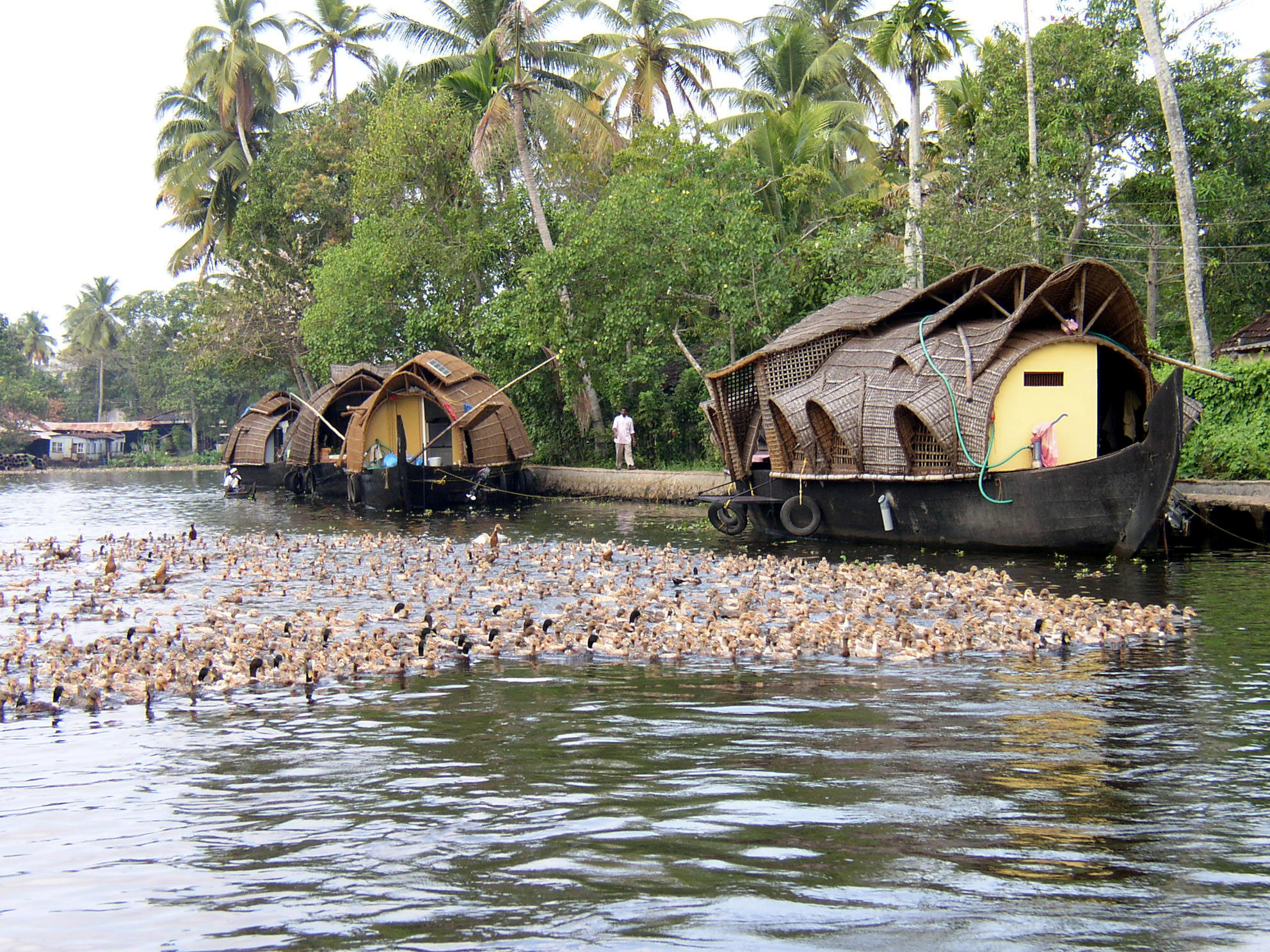
Boats and ducks in the backwaters

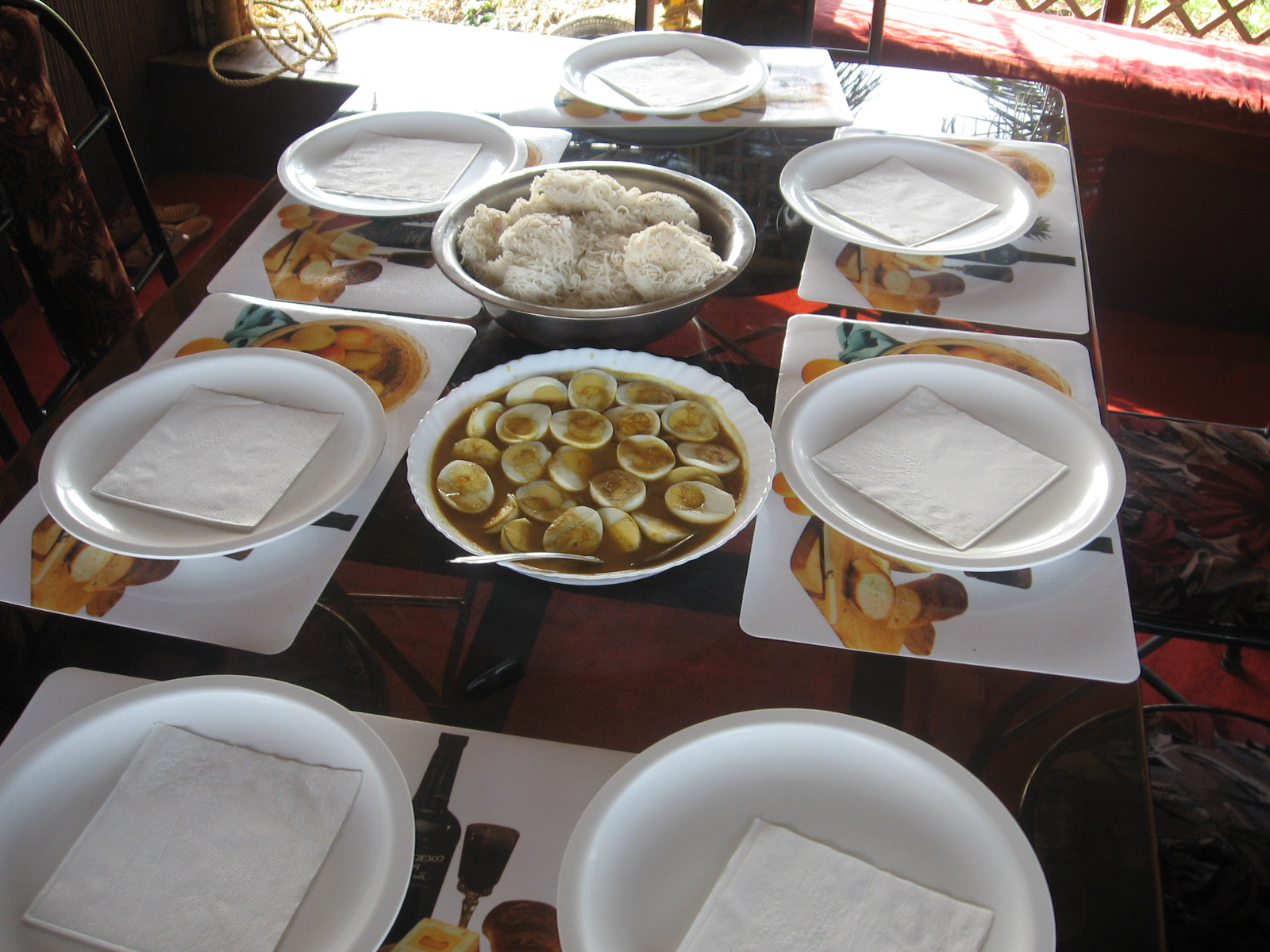
Food prepared in a kettuvallam

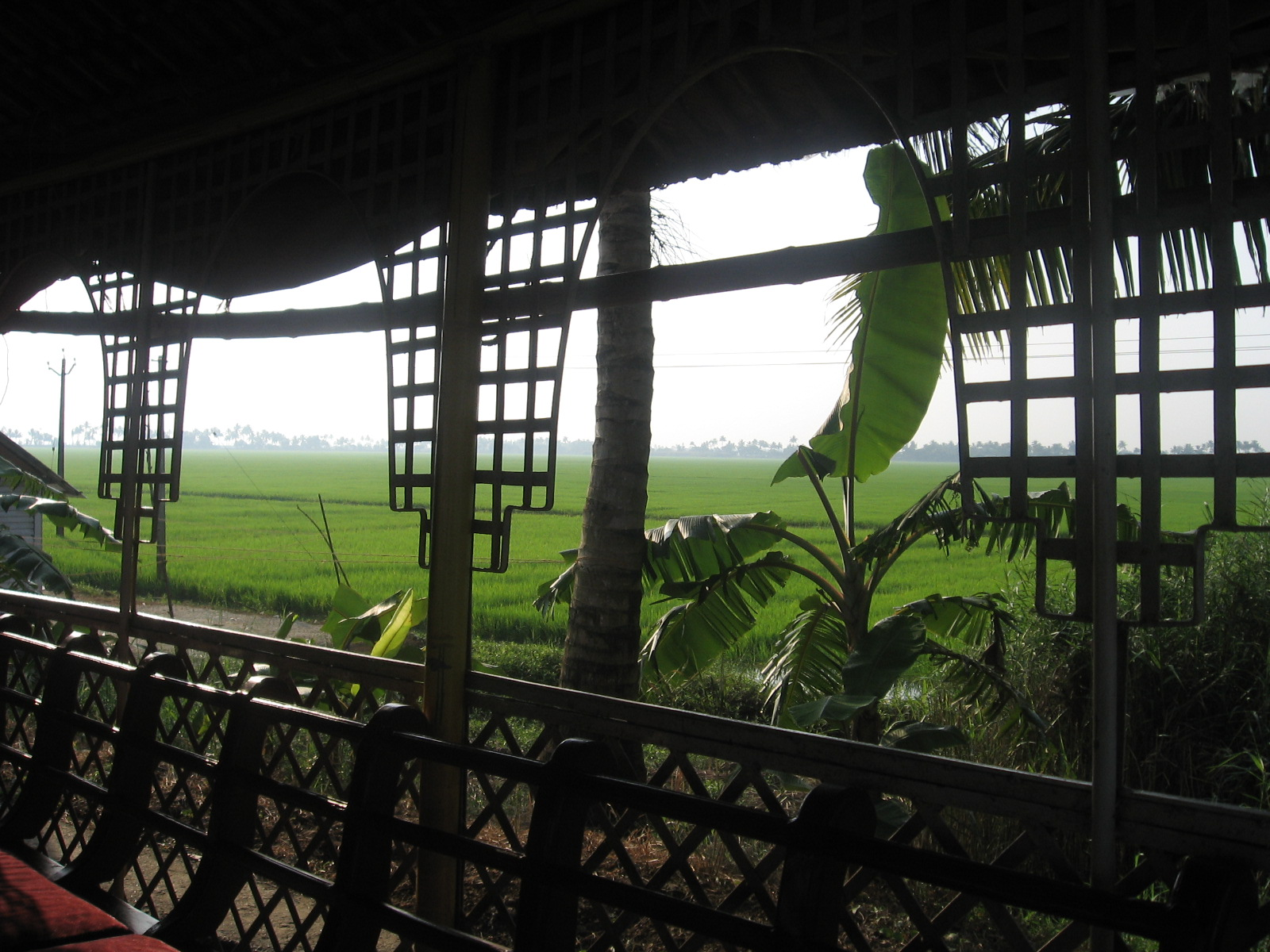
View from a kettuvallam
