= Parvathi Puthannaar =

Canal in Kerala, India

Parvati Puthannar (Malayalam: പാർവതി പുത്തനാർ) is a man-made canal that runs through the west coast of the Thiruvananthapuram district. It was named after Rani Parvathi Bai, who was the regent queen of Travancore during the time it was created. "Puthannar" in Malayalam means "the new river". It was created primarily for connecting the Travancore capital to Kadinamkulam, the Vamanapuram River and finally to Kochi. This canal also has access to the king's boat landing place, Vallakadavu, where the king's boathouse is located.

It starts from the Kadinamkulam Lake in the north and flows south-east, parallel to the Trivandrum coast. It finally ends in a small delta near Poonthura and empties into the Arabian Sea. The delta formed by Parvathi Puthannar is known as Poonthura Pozhi. At first, its water was very clear and fresher than any river or other man-made canal in India. At that time Travancore was the only hygienic, clean city in India. However, Parvathi Puthannar is now polluted and most portions are not navigable, due to pollution and weeds.

Parvathi Puthannar is part of the West Coast Canal which forms Waterway 3 (NW-III).
