= National Waterways Act, 2016 =

Act of the Parliament of India

Parliament of India
- Long title: An Act to make provisions for existing national waterways and to provide for the declaration of certain inland waterways to be national waterways and also to provide for the regulation and development of the said waterways for the purposes of shipping and navigation and for matters connected therewith or incidental thereto.
- Citation: Act No. 17 of 2016
- Territorial extent: India
- Passed by: Lok Sabha
- Passed: 21 December 2015
- Passed by: Rajya Sabha
- Passed: 10 March 2016
- Assented to by: President Pranab Mukherjee
- Assented to: 25 March 2016
- Commenced: 12 April 2016

Legislative history

Initiating chamber: Lok Sabha
- Bill title: National Waterways Bill, 2015
- Bill citation: Bill No. 122 of 2015
- Introduced by: Nitin Gadkari
- Introduced: 5 May 2015
- Standing Committee: 21 March 2015–12 August 2015
- Passed: 21 December 2015

Revising chamber: Rajya Sabha
- Passed: 9 March 2016

Final stages
- Rajya Sabha amendments considered by the Lok Sabha: 15 March 2016

Amends
- Inland Waterways Authority of India Act, 1985 (82 of 1985)

Repeals
- 1. National Waterway (Allahabad-Haldia Stretch of the Ganga BhagirathiHooghly River) Act, 1982 (49 of 1982); 2. National Waterway (Sadiya-Dhubri Stretch of Brahmaputra River) Act, 1988 (40 of 1988); 3. National Waterway (Kollam-Kottapuram Stretch of West Coast Canal and Champakara and Udyogmandal Canals) Act, 1992 (25 of 1992); 4. National Waterway (Talcher-Dhamra Stretch of Rivers, GeonkhaliCharbatia Stretch of East Coast Canal, Charbatia-Dhamra Stretch of Matai River and Mahanadi Delta Rivers) Act, 2008 (23 of 2008); 5. National Waterway (Kakinada-Puducherry Stretch of Canals and the Kaluvelly Tank, Bhadrachalam-Rajahmundry Stretch of River Godavari and WazirabadVijayawada Stretch of River Krishna) Act, 2008 (24 of 2008)
- Status: In force

The National Waterways Act, 2016 is an Act of Parliament of India. It was tabled in Lok Sabha by Minister of Shipping, Road Transport and Highways Nitin Gadkari on 5 May 2015. The act merges five existing acts which have declared the five National Waterways and proposes 101 additional National Waterways. The act came into force from 12 April 2016.

== History ==
The National Waterways Bill, 2015 was tabled in Lok Sabha by Minister of Shipping, Road Transport and Highways Nitin Gadkari on 5 May 2015. It was passed in Lok Sabha on 21 December 2015 and in Rajya Sabha on 9 March 2016. Then, it was finally passed in Lok Sabha again on 15 March 2016 due to the amendments made in Rajya Sabha moved by Minister of State for Shipping Pon Radhakrishnan.

== Provisions ==
Under Entry 24 of the Union List of the Seventh Schedule of the Constitution, the central government can make laws on shipping and navigation on inland waterways which are classified as national waterways by Parliament by law. The act identifies additional 106 waterways as national waterways. The Schedule of the act also specifies the extent of development to be undertaken on each waterway. The act repeals the five Acts that declare the existing national waterways. These five national waterways are now covered under the Bill. The Statement of Objects and Reasons of the Bill states that while inland waterways are recognised as a fuel efficient, cost effective and environment-friendly mode of transport, they have received lesser investment as compared to roads and railways. Since inland waterways are lagging behind other modes of transport, the central government has evolved a policy for integrated development of inland waterways.

== See also ==
- Inland Waterways Authority of India
- Inland Vessels (Amendment) Act, 2007

== External ==
- The National Waterways Bill, 2015 on PRS
