= Latin Catholics of Malabar =

Group of Catholics in southern India

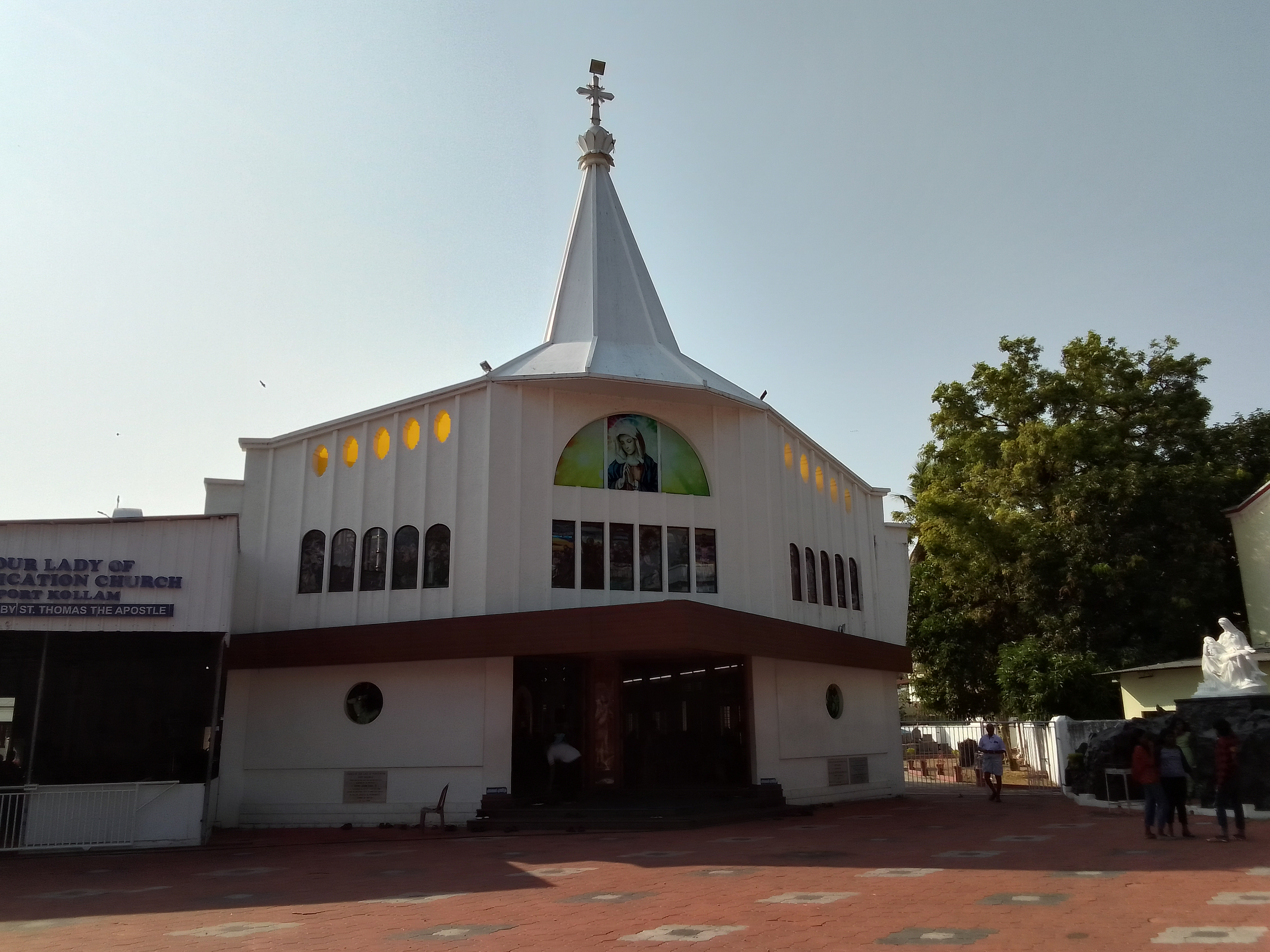
- Our Lady of Purification Church, Kollam.

Total population
- Approx. 1,000,000

Regions with significant populations
- India (predominantly in Kerala, significant migrant populations also found in Bangalore, Mumbai, Delhi and other major cities); UAE (Dubai); Oman; Kuwait; USA (New York metropolitan area, Chicago, Houston, Dallas, Tampa, Detroit, Atlanta, Philadelphia, New Jersey, Los Angeles, San Francisco Bay Area); Europe – UK (London, Birmingham) The Netherlands (Amsterdam) Canada (Toronto, Edmonton, Whitehorse

Languages
- Vernacular: Malayalam, Cochin Portuguese Creole Liturgical: Latin, French, Malayalam

Religion
- primarily Catholic Church (Latin Church)

Related ethnic groups
- Malayalis, Ezhavars, Nadar (caste), Dheevaras, Saint Thomas Christians, Portuguese, Luso-Indian

The Latin Catholics of Malabar Coast, also known as Malabar Latin Catholics or Latin Christians of Kerala (Malayalam: മലബാർ ലത്തീൻ കത്തോലിക്കർ or മലബാർ ലത്തീൻ ക്രിസ്ത്യാനികൾ) are a multi-ethnic religious group in Kerala adhering to the Roman Rite liturgical practices of the Latin Church, on the Malabar Coast, the southwestern coast of India. Ecclesiastically, they constitute the ecclesiastical provinces of Calicut, Verapoly and Trivandrum.

They are predominantly Malayali people and speak the Malayalam language, though a subgroup of Luso-Indians speaks the Cochin Portuguese Creole. They trace their origins to the evangelization of Malabar Coast by the Dominican, Franciscan, Jesuit and Carmelite missionaries, mainly French and Portuguese.

== History ==
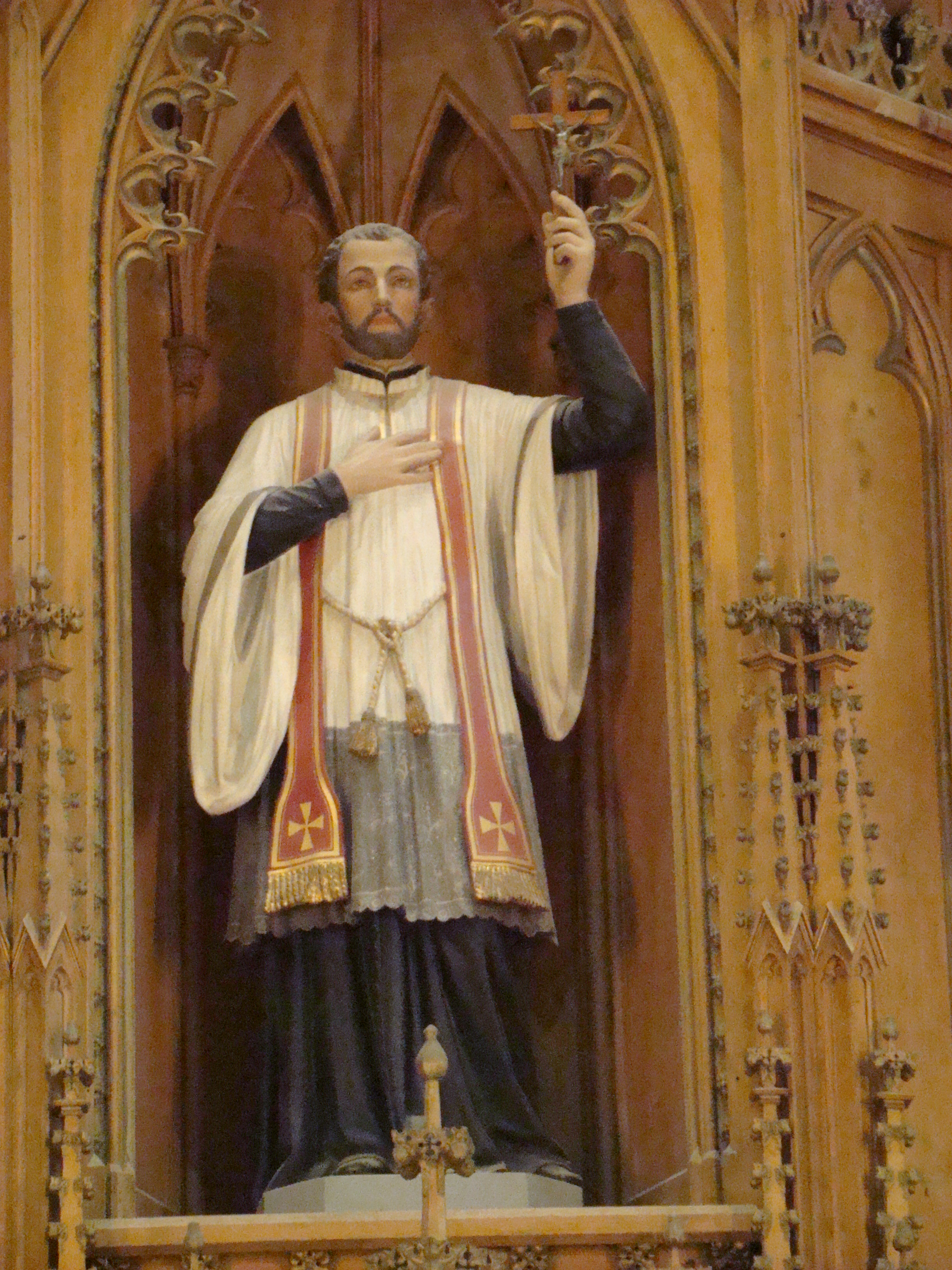
Francis Xavier, the patron saint of the Latin Catholics of Kerala.

=== Early missions ===
Latin Catholicism in India traces its early origins to the Fransciscan missions sent to Asia under the leadership of John of Monte Corvino. Friar Odoric of Pordenone arrived in India in 1321. He visited Malabar, touching at Pandarani (Koyilandy) (20 m. north of Calicut), at Cranganore, and at Quilon (Kollam) proceeding thence, apparently, to Ceylon and to the shrine of Apostle Saint Thomas at Mylapur near Madras. He writes he had found the place where Saint Thomas was buried.

Father Jordanus Catalani, a French Dominican missionary, followed in 1321–22. He reported to Rome, apparently from somewhere on the west coast of India, that he had given Christian burial to four martyred monks. Jordanus is known for his 1329 Mirabilia describing the marvels of the East. He furnished the best account of Indian regions and the Christians, the products, climate, manners, customs, fauna and flora given by any European in the Middle Ages which was considered superior even to Marco Polo's.

The Diocese of Quilon headquartered at Kollam is the first Latin diocese in South Asia and the Far East, having been first erected on 9 August 1329 and re-erected on 1 September 1886. In 1329 Pope John XXII (in captivity at Avignon) erected Quilon as the first Diocese in the whole Indies as suffragan to the Archdiocese of Sultany in Persia. Its territorial jurisdiction extended throughout the Indian subcontinent, East Indies, and the Far East. By a separate Bull "Venerabili Fratri Jordano", the same Pope, on 21 August 1329 appointed the French Dominican friar Jordanus Catalani de Severac as the first Bishop of Quilon. In 1347, Giovanni de Marignolli visited the shrine of Saint Thomas near the modern Madras, and then proceeded to what he calls the kingdom of Saba, and identifies with the Sheba of Scripture, but which seems from various particulars to have been Java. Taking ship again for Malabar on his way to Europe, he encountered great storms.

=== Arrival of the Portuguese ===
In 1453, the fall of Constantinople, a bastion of Christianity in Asia Minor to Islamic Ottoman Empire, marked the end of the Eastern Roman Empire or Byzantine Empire, and severed European trade links by land with Asia. This massive blow to Christendom spurred the Age of Discovery as Europeans were seeking alternative routes east by sea along with the goal of forging alliances with pre-existing Christian nations. Along with pioneer Portuguese long-distance maritime travellers, that reached the Malabar Coast in the late 15th century, came Portuguese missionaries who introduced the Latin Catholic church in India. They made contact with the St Thomas Christians in Kerala, which at that time were following Eastern Christian practices and still follow Syrian liturgy and were under the jurisdiction of Church of the East.

The history of Portuguese missionaries in India starts with the neo-apostles who reached Kappad near Kozhikode on 20 May 1498 along with the Portuguese explorer Vasco da Gama who was seeking to form anti-Islamic alliances with pre-existing Christian nations. The lucrative spice trade was further temptation for the Portuguese crown. When he and the Portuguese missionaries arrived they found no Christians in the country, except in Malabar known as St. Thomas Christians who represented less than 2% of the total population and the then-largest Christian church within India. The Christians were friendly to Portuguese missionaries at first; there was an exchange of gifts between them, and these groups were delighted at their common faith.

During the second expedition, the Portuguese fleet comprising 13 ships and 18 priests, under Captain Pedro Álvares Cabral, anchored at Cochin on 26 November 1500. Cabral soon won the goodwill of the Raja of Cochin. He allowed four priests to do apostolic work among the early Christian communities scattered in and around Cochin. Thus Portuguese missionaries established Portuguese Mission in 1500. Dom Francisco de Almeida, the first Portuguese Viceroy, got permission from the Kochi Raja to build two church edifices – namely Santa Cruz Basilica (founded 1505) and St. Francis Church (founded 1506) using stones and mortar which was unheard of at that time as the local prejudices were against such a structure for any purpose other than a royal palace or a temple.

Historically the Latin Catholics of Kerala were protected by the Portuguese, Dutch, French and the British. The Latin Catholics were referred to as "Our Christians" while the Saint Thomas Syrian Christians were oppressed by the Portuguese in their rule.

== Subgroups ==
The Latin Catholics of Kerala form a multi-ethnic religious community with members of different castes and origins. Majority of the Latin Catholics were converts by the Portuguese Padroado missionaries in India. Many backward Hindus especially Ezhavars, Nadars, Viswakarmas, Vilakkithala Nairs, along with the various fishing community castes like Mukkuvars, Arayans, Valans and Dheevars were converted to Christianity after the 15th century by Portuguese missionaries in Kerala. Many Saint Thomas Syrian Christian families also joined the Latin Church, especially in Cochin and Quilon.

The Roman Catholics of Latin rite, also called Latinites (Latinkar), are to be distinguished from the Syro-Malabar Catholics, viz. the Eastern Catholics of Syrian rite. The Latin Catholics consists of several subgroups which trace different origins. According to their traditional division, attested from the 18th century onwards, the Anjoottikkar (the 'Five hundred'), Ezhunnoottikkar (the 'Seven hundred') and Munnoottikkar (the 'Three hundred') are significant among these groups. Each of the groups claim superior origins and social status over the others. Bitter divisions and mutual animosity between these groups have often led to creation of overlapping boundaries of dioceses which tend to be dominated by one group or the other.

The Anjuttikkar/Anjoottikkar consists of the various fishing communities like Mukkuvars, Dheevars, Paravars, Valans and Arayans, who were differentiated from the other groups. The Anjuttikkar (fishing community) forms 45% of the Latin Catholic community of Kerala. Mainly focused in the coastal regions of Thiruvananthapuram, Kollam, Alappuzha and Ernakulam districts. The Anjuttikkar who reside in the Ernakulam district are known as Kochikkar and those who reside in the districts of Alappuzha, Kollam and Thiruvananthapuram are known as Kollamkar.

The second, main, subgroup known as Ezhunoottikkar/Ezhunuttikkar hailed from the various castes like Ezhavas, Thiyyas, Vishwakarmas and a few lower subcastes of the Nairs. The lower strata of the Ezhunoottikkar consists of the untouchable castes like Pulayar and Parayar. According to legend, the Ezhunoottikkar are descendants of seven hundred Latinized soldiers of the Kingdom of Cochin who were converted by the Portuguese for leading a battle against the Zamorin of Calicut (Samoothiri).

The Portuguese soldiers, merchants and enfranchised slaves, had intermarried within the natives, and their descendants came to be known as the Munnuttikkar/Munnoottikkar (Luso-Indians/Anglo Indians) who form an endogamous subgroup among the Keralite Latin Catholics. They were also called as Topasses or Toppessis/Tupasis as they wore hats and used other western descended clothing. Many Topasses served as soldiers in the Dutch, French and English colonial armies. Their strong European roots, for instance through their use of the Portuguese language, made them feeling different from the indigenous converts, and they remained most of the time directly dependent on the colonial authorities. In this respect, the Dutch established a clear distinction between them, viz. 'the ones dressed in hats (and trousers)', and the whole of the other, indigenous, Latin Catholic converts, collectively designated by the name Mundikars, viz. 'the ones wearing the white cloth (and puggery)'. The Munnuttikkar divide themselves into two sects: the White Munnuttikkar and the Black Munnuttikkar. The division is not based on skin colour instead by their caste origins. The White Munnuttikkar are descendants of Portuguese men and Nair/Nambudiri Brahmin women while the Black Munnuttikkar are descendants of Portuguese and women of lower castes. The Munnuttikkar are found mostly in the coastal towns of Kerala like Cananore, Tellichery, Calicut, Cochin, Alleppey and Quilon.

A fourth traditional division consists of the Aruvathinalukkar/Aravatnalukar (the 'Sixty-four'), an endogamous subsect among the Latin Catholics who are believed to be descended from several Savarna upper castes like Nambudiri Brahmin, Nair, Pushpaka Brahmin and the Ambalavasi.

The Nadar Latin Catholics form a significant part of the Malabarese Latin Catholics. The Latin Nadars prefer maritial alliances with Hindu Nadars instead of other Latin subgroups. They are concentrated in the southern and eastern regions of the Trivandrum district like Parassala, Neyyantinkara, Vellarada, Kattakkada, Kovalam and Malayinkeezhu. In the 19th century Travancore, women belonging to castes below the Nairs were prohibited from covering their upper body. The Nadar Latin Catholic women of Southern Travancore (Trivandrum and Kanyakumari) rebelled against the enforcement of upper body exposure (Channar Revolt) from 1813 to 1859. Eventually in 1859 the King of Travancore proclaimed the right for all women in Travancore to cover themselves.

In northern Kerala, mainly in Kassergode (Kasaragod), Cannanore (Kannur), Tellicherry (Thalassery) and Cochin (Kochi) a small population of Konkani Latin Catholic Christians are found. They are descendants of the Konkani Manglorean Catholics who migrated from the Canara region (coastal Karnataka) to Kerala in the 1780's to escape the persecution by Tippu Sultan. The Konkani Manglorean Catholics had accepted Christianity in Goa and migrated to Kanara in 16th and 17th centuries. These Konkani Catholics have many subgroups like Bammons (Konkani Brahmin sub-castes like Saraswat Brahmins, Padyes, Daivadnyas), Chardos(Kshatriya) and Gaudos(Vaishya).

The Roman or Latin Catholics of Kerala are grouped under Other Backward Classes by positive discrimination.

The Latin Catholics of Kerala are a highly exogamous community and tend to intermarry with other Hindu castes, unlike the Saint Thomas Syrian Christians who practice strict endogamy.

== Socio-cultural and religious identity ==
=== Arts ===
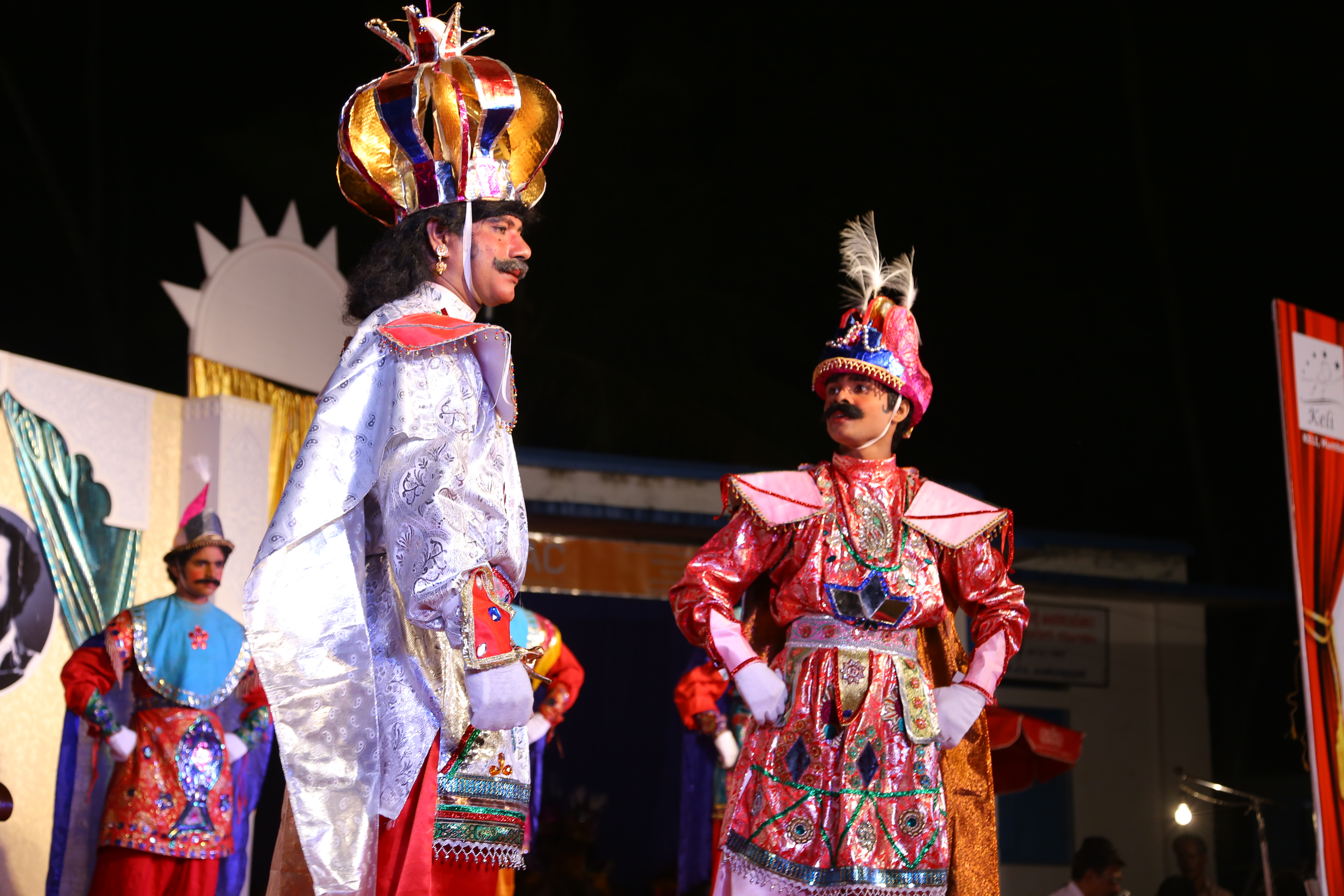
Chavittunadakam

The Artforms of the Latin Catholics of Kerala were hugely influenced by the Portuguese and the native Keralite culture.

The Chavittunadakam, loaned from the European Opera in is one among the most popular artforms performed by the Latin Catholics of Kerala. It originated in the 16th century in Fort Kochi and is prevalent among the Keralite Latin Catholic community of the districts of Ernakulam and Alappuzha.

Devastha Vili is a ritual artform traditionally performed as part of the 50 days long Lent by the Latin Catholics of Kerala. It consists of a Latin chant which is chanted as a prayer by a small group. The leader holds a huge wooden cross and ceremonially chants the prayer. The Devastha Vili has its origin in the 15th century when Francis Xavier evangelized natives in Cochin.

=== Attire ===
The Attire of the Latin Catholics differed from various classes among them. The Luso-Indians had hugely differentiable Portuguese attire. The Saint Thomas Syrian Christians who adopted Latin Christianity continued to wear the traditional Chattayum Mundum and the Mundu which they used to wear before.

=== Religion and Ritual ===
The Latin Catholics of Kerala follow the Roman, Carmelite, Franciscan and Friars Minor Capuchin Rites for worship and the Roman Rite being the most used. Some parts of the Mass are sung in Latin. The Holy Mass is often referred as "Holy Qurbana", the name which the Saint Thomas Christians use for their East Syriac Rite Eucharistic liturgy.

Several customs of the Malabar Latin Catholics such as in engagement, marriage and funeral rituals are similar to Syrian Catholics of Malabar community and several Hindu castes of Kerala.

=== Cuisine ===
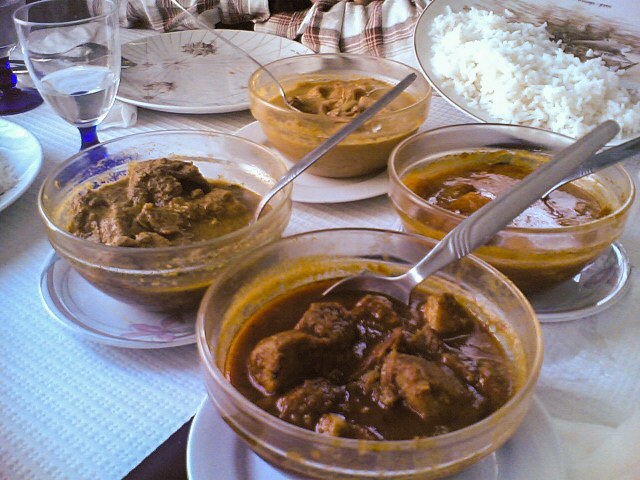
Vindhaloo (Portuguese curry)

The cuisine of the Latin Catholics of Kerala is majorly seafood and Portuguese influenced diet. Dishes like Vindhaloo (meat dish based on carne de vinha d'alhos), Chicken Stew, Fish Molee (Indo-Portuguese fish curry), Pigadosi (Desert made with milk and bananas) and various seafood items are the most popular.

Pork, Beef, Vinegar, Garlic, Paprika, Mint, Black Pepper, Thyme and Rosemary are all important aspects of the Keralite Latin Catholic cuisine.

Spices like Red Chilli, Turmeric and Coriander lack in the Latin Catholic cuisine and are replaced by Black Pepper due to the Portuguese influence. Consumption of bread and other baked goods are also high in the Latin cuisine.

== Church architecture ==
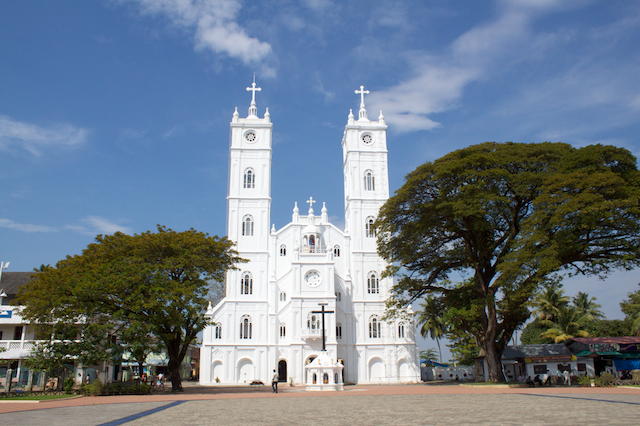
Vallarapadam St Mary's Basilica is one of the most important pilgrimage churches of the Latin Catholics.

The Latin Catholics churches in the initial stages were built in the Portuguese colonial Style with Renaissance facades and long naves and Italian Baroque decoration. They were initially built from laterite blocks veneered with lime plaster (chunam). Later after the Dutch and British conquest, today they resemble modern Anglican architecture due to influence of the British in India. Some churches were also built the way Syrian Churches in Kerala were built.

Some notable Latin Catholic churches are:

- Church of Our Lady of Hope (Igreja de Nossa Senhora da Esperança), (Est. 1605), Vypeen
- Santa Cruz Basilica, (Estd.1505), Fort Kochi
- National Shrine Basilica of Our Lady of Ransom, (Igreja de Nossa Senhora do Resgate), Vallarpadam
- Basilica of Our lady of Mount Carmel & St Joseph, Varappuzha
- St. Sebastian's Church, (Est. 1833), Thoppumpady
- Basilica of Our Lady of Snows, Pallippuram
- Holy Cross Church, Mattachery
- St. Joseph's Metropolitan Cathedral Palayam, Thiruvananthapuram

== Prominent Malabar Latin Catholics ==
- K J Yesudas - National Award winning playback singer
- Lal (actor) - Malayalam film director, producer and actor
- Balu Varghese- Malayalam actor
- Hibi Eden - INC politician and present MP of Ernakulam Lok Sabha constituency.
- Sebastian Paul - Indian politician, former Member of Parliament.
- Sanju Samson - Indian International cricketer.
- P.J. Antony - First Malayalam actor to win the National Award for Best Actor.

== Demographics ==
The Latin Catholics of Kerala form 13.2% of the Christians in the state. They form 2.37% of the total population of Kerala. The community is concentrated in the coastal regions of Thiruvananthapuram, Kollam, Alappuzha and Ernakulam districts. Forming 65% of the Christians in the Thiruvananthapuram district, 36% of the Christians in the Kollam district, 24% of the Christians in the Ernakulam district and 23% of the Christians in the Alappuzha district, they have significant populations in Trivandrum, Alleppey, Neyyantinkara, Parassala, Punalur, Quilon, Verapoly, Vypeen, Calicut, Cannanore and Cochin.

== See also ==
- Bombay East Indian Catholics
- Reddy Catholics
- Goan Catholics
- Mangalorean Catholics
- Syrian Catholics of Malabar

== Bibliography ==
- MacKenzie, Gordon Thomson (1901). Christianity in Travancore.
- Nagam Aiya, V. (1906). The Travancore State Manual. Vol. 2.
- Ayyar, L. K. Anantakrishna (1926). Anthropology of Syrian Christians. Ernakulam:Government Press. - see chapter 6: "The Roman Catholics of the Latin rite", pp. 253–266
- Menon, A Sreedhara (1964). Quilon District Gazetteer.
- Koilparambil, George (1982). Caste in the Catholic Community in Kerala. Cochin: St. Theresa's College.
- Prabhu, Alan Machado (1999). Sarasvati's Children: A History of the Mangalorean Christians. Bangalore: I.J.A. Publications. ISBN 978-81-86778-25-8.
- Thayil, Thomas (2003). The Latin Christians of Kerala: A Study on Their Origins. Kristu Jyoti Publications. ISBN 978-81-87370-18-5.
