= Dheevara =

Dheevara may refer to:

- Dheevara (caste), a fishing community in southern India
- "Dhivara", a song by M. M. Keeravani, Ramya Behara and Deepu from the 2015 Indian Baahubali: The Beginning
