= St. Joseph's Monastery Shrine, Mannanam =

St. Joseph's Monastery Shrine
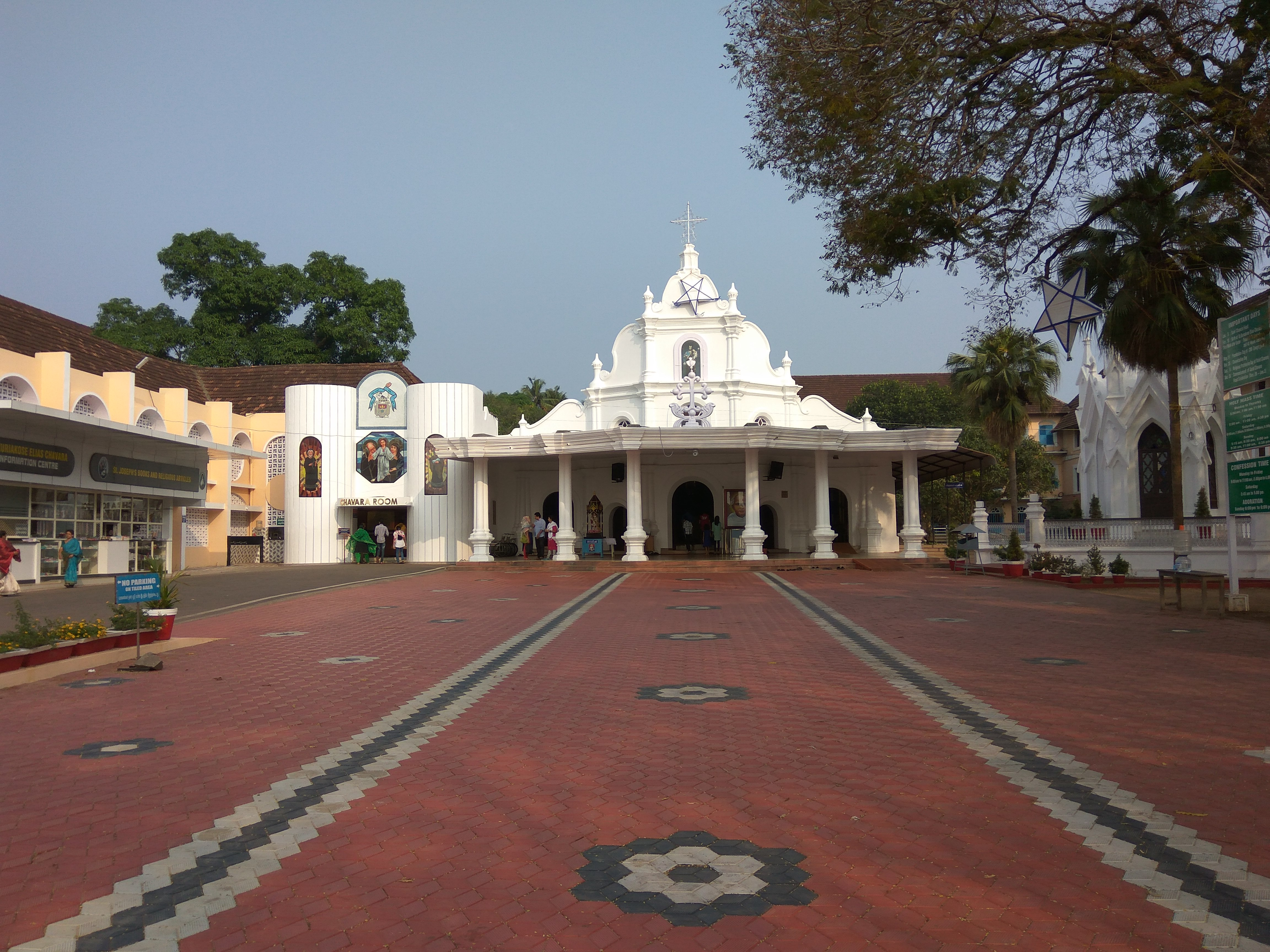
- St. Joseph's Monastery Shrine
- 9°38′49.6″N 76°31′10.2″E
- Location: Mannanam
- Country: India
- Denomination: Syro-Malabar Catholic Church

Administration
- District: Kottayam

St. Joseph's Church, Mannanam is a Syro-Malabar Catholic Church in Mannanam, Kerala. The church was built on top of a hill by Kuriakose Elias Chavara whose body is buried in the church.

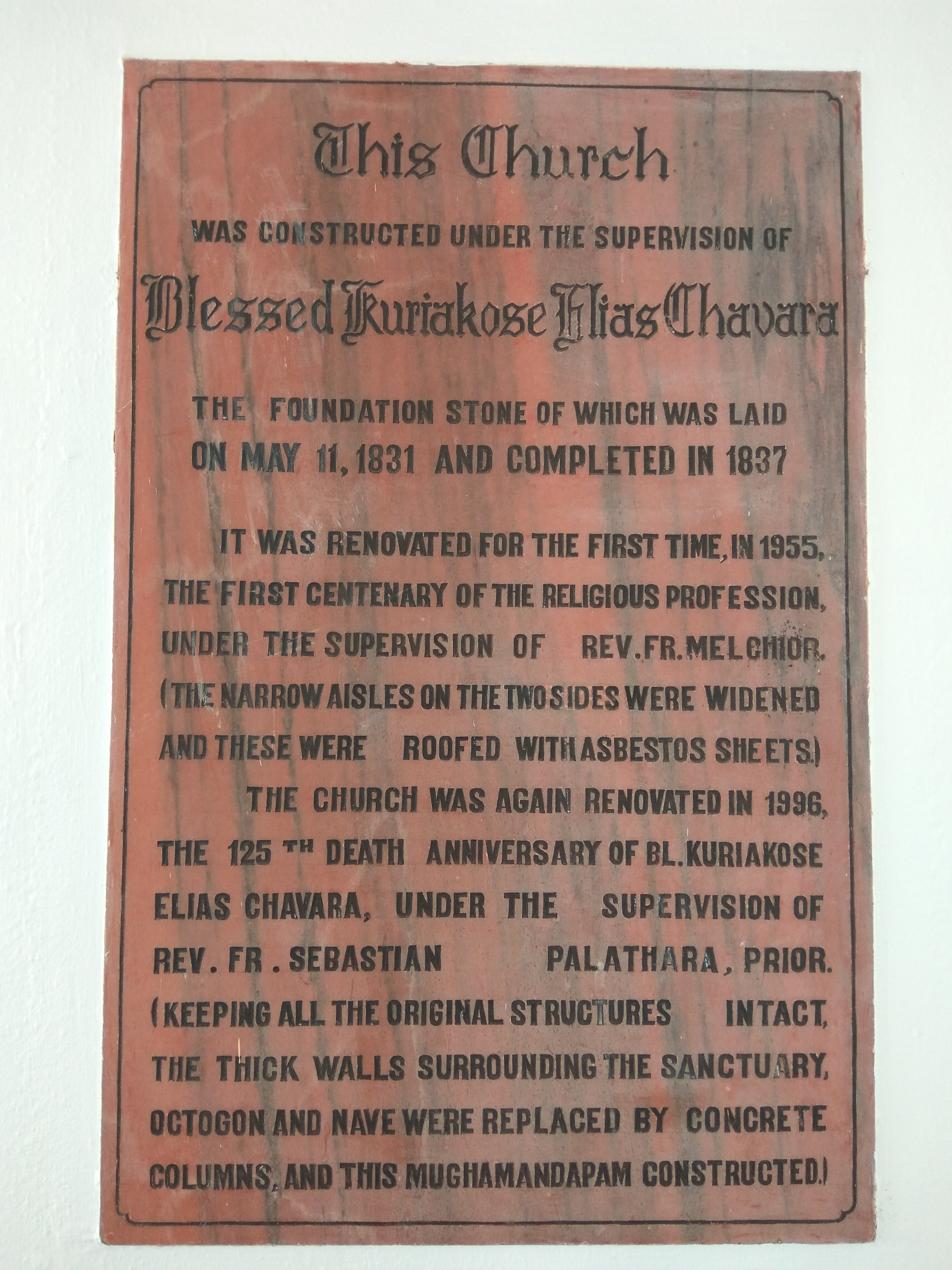
The plaque describing the history of the church

== Pilgrimage center ==
The church is a pilgrimage center for followers of Kuriakose Elias Chavara. The church was commissioned by him on 11 May 1831 and completed in 1837. It was subsequently renovated in 1955 and 1996. The church compound also houses the residential unit used by the saint. In 2014, when Chavara was canonized as a saint, 60,000 people attended the thanksgiving mass at the church complex which was celebrated by 100 priests.

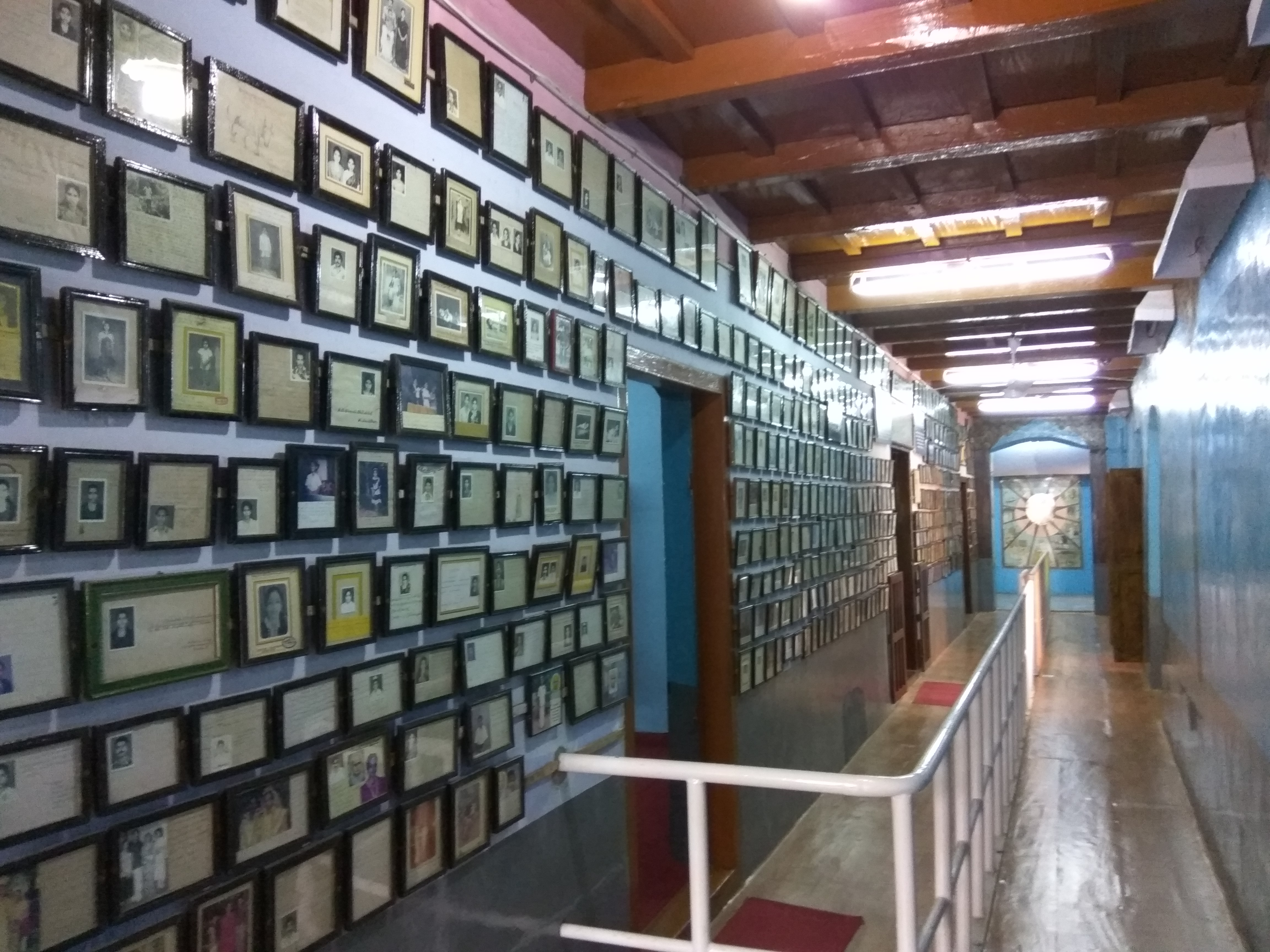
Framed claims attributing deeds to Chavara's intercession outside his room

He also started the first printing press in Kottayam in the church complex in 1846. The printing press was used to bring out the first Malayalam daily Nasrani Deepika. He died in 1871,l and was buried at St. Philomina's Church, Koonammavu. His corpse was transferred to the St. Joseph Church in 1889.
