= National Shrine Basilica of Our Lady of Ransom =

- Basilica de Nossa Senhora do Resgate
- വല്ലാര്‍പാടം പള്ളി
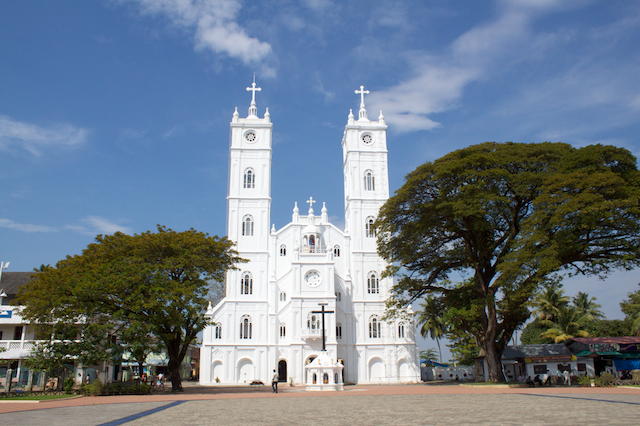

- Location within Kerala
- 9.99°N 76.25°E
- Country: India
- Denomination: Catholic Church
- Sui iuris church: Latin Church
- Website: www.vallarpadambasilica.com

History
- Former name: Igreja de Nossa Senhora do Resgate
- Status: National shrine Minor Basilica
- Dedication: Our Lady of Ransom

Architecture
- Functional status: Active
- Architectural type: Portuguese Colonial, Gothic Revival

Specifications
- Materials: Brick

Administration
- Archdiocese: Archdiocese of Verapoly

Clergy
- Archbishop: Joseph Kalathiparambil

The National Shrine Basilica of Our Lady of Ransom, more commonly referred to as Vallarpadam Basilica (Malayalam: വല്ലാര്‍പാടം പള്ളി, Cochin Portuguese: Basílica de Nossa Senhora do Resgate) is a minor basilica and a major Christian pilgrimage centre in Vallarpadam, a suburb in Ernakulam, in the city of Kochi, in Kerala, India. Around 5 million Christians visit the basilica every year.

== Change of status ==
On September 12th 2004 the Catholic Bishops Conference of India raised the church to the status of a "National Shrine". The following December Pope John Paul II granted the honorific title of Minor Basilica to the church. Documents related to the raising of the status of the Our Lady of Ransom Church on the island were delivered to the Archbishop of Varappuzha Daniel Acharuparampil by the president of the Catholic Bishops' Conference of India, Cardinal Telesphore Toppo.

== Location ==
Vallarpadam is situated next to Bolgatty Island on the west, and is linked to the Ernakulam mainland via the new Goshree bridges. It is about 3.5 kilometers (2.2 mi) in length in the north-south direction and hosts a population of 10,000 people. Vallarpadam is about one kilometer (½ mile) away from the Ernakulam mainland.

== History ==
The picture of the Virgin Mary and the Infant Jesus, installed at the top of the main altar of the Vallarpadam Church, was brought by Portuguese merchants under the leadership of Vasco da Gama in 1524. In 1676, the old church, which was known as the Church of the Holy Spirit, founded by the Portuguese missionaries, was destroyed by a heavy flood. The picture survived and was found floating in the backwaters. Paliyath Raman Valiyachan, the prime minister of Maharaja of Cochin was the one who recovered it. The present church at Vallarpadam is built on land donated by Paliyath Raman Valiyachan. A sanctuary lamp which he donated has been burning day and night since 1676 in his honour.

In May 1752 a miracle is believed to have taken place which made Vallarpadam a pilgrimage site. In Vallarpadam there was a young Nair lady named Meenakshi Amma, who was a member of a noble family called Palliyil Veedu. Together with her son she was sailing to Mattancherry. There arose a storm and the boat capsized. Meenakshi Amma and her son went deep down into the backwaters. She promised to devote the rest of her life to Mary’s service if she and her child were saved. It was a promise she kept. On the third day, as per instructions in a dream, the parish priest, Rev. Fr. Miguel Correa, asked the fishermen to cast net in the river, and Meenakshi Amma and her son were rescued. After her death, the church put up the picture of Meenakshiamma and her child alongside the painting of the Virgin Mary.

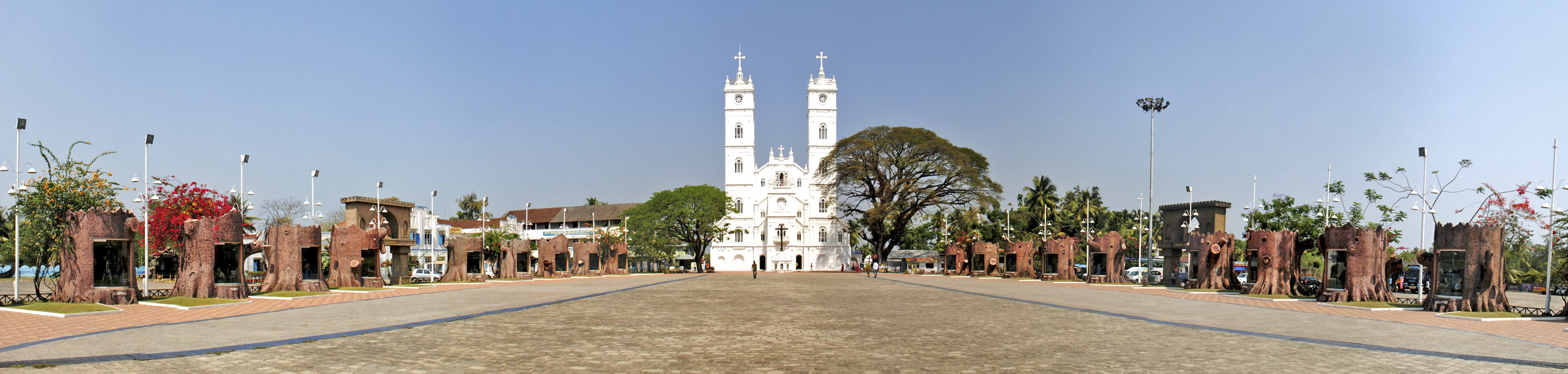
A panoramic view of Vallarpadam Basilica

== Festival ==
The Feast of Vallarpadathamma is celebrated from 16 to 24 September every year. Thousands of pilgrims come to Vallarpadam to participate in the feast, especially on the 24th of September.

== Photo gallery ==
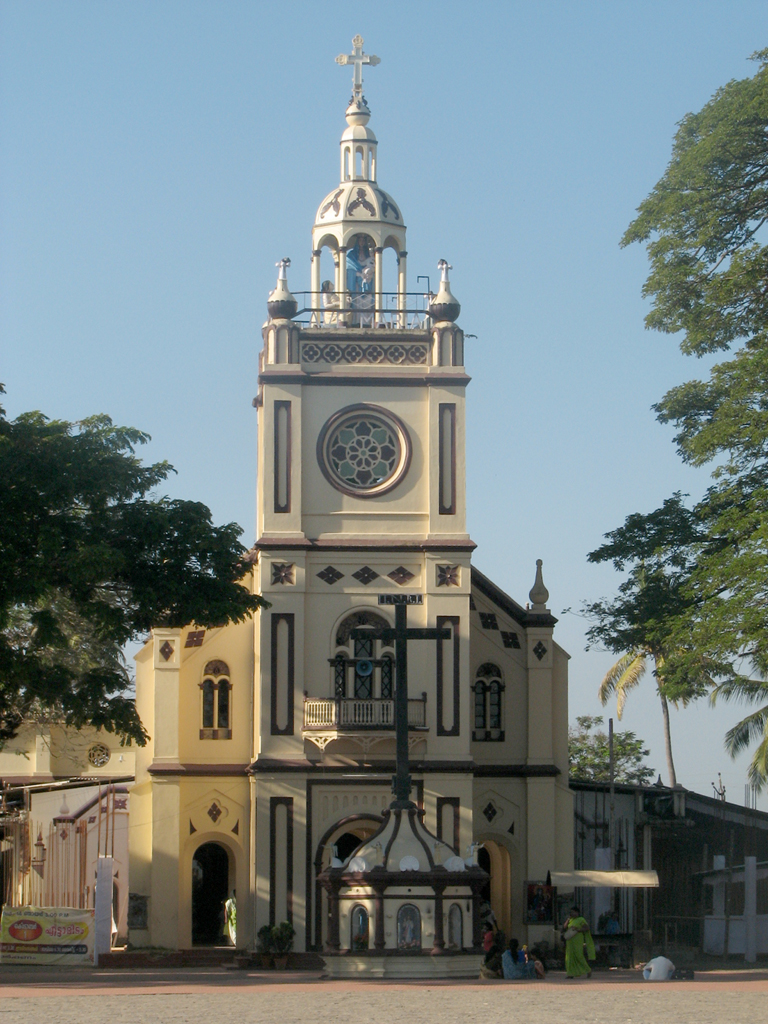
Old view of Vallarpadam Church, Kochi, Kerala, India

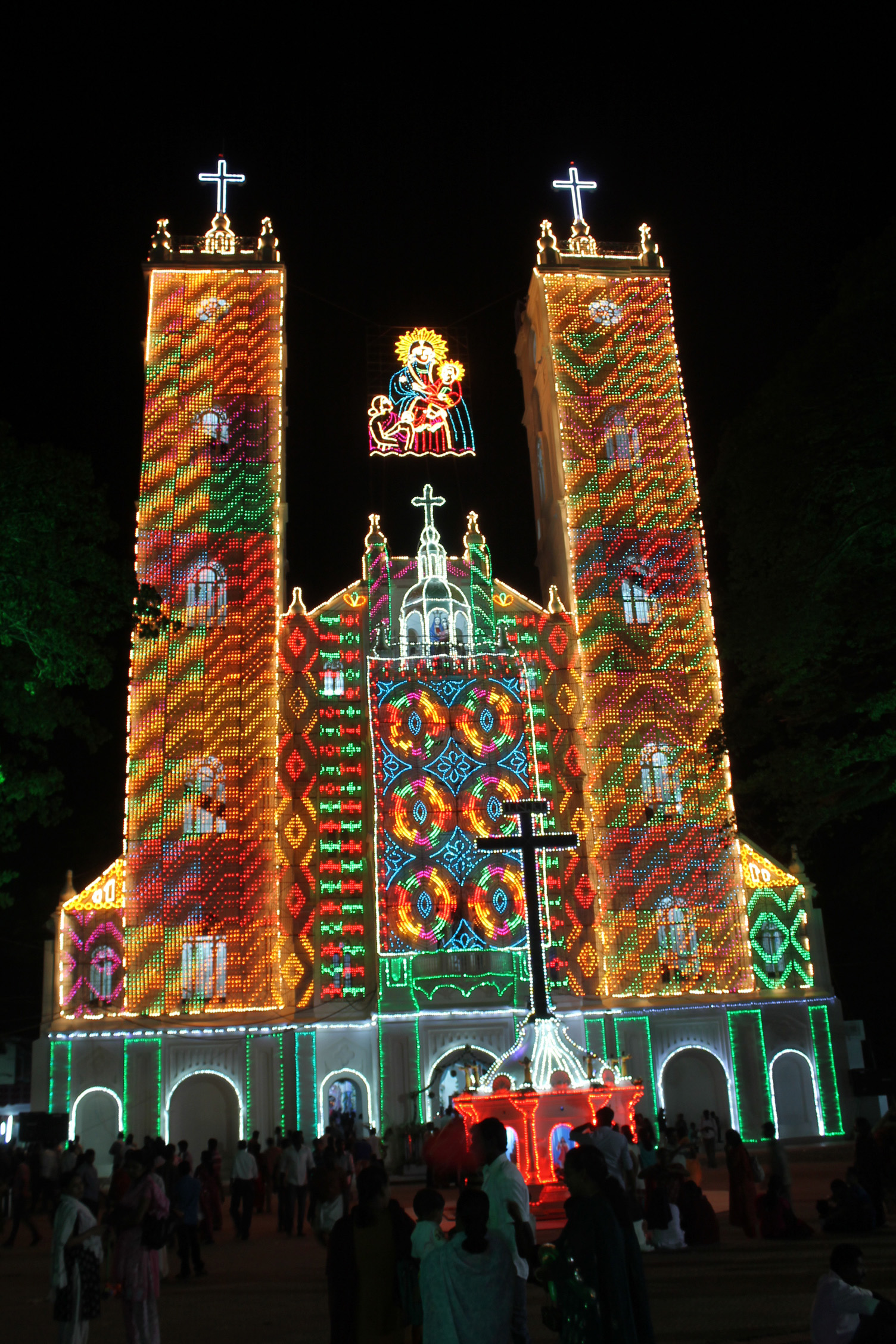
Vallarpadam Church lighted up for the Feast

== See also ==
- Roman Catholic Archdiocese of Verapoly
- Basilica of Our Lady of Good Health
- Basilica of Our lady of Mount Carmel & St Joseph
- St. Philomena's Forane Church & St. Chavara Pilgrim Centre
- Latin Catholics of Malabar
