= Dheevara (caste) =

South Indian caste

Dheevara is a grouping of castes from the Kerala state of South India, who are categorised as Other Backward Class in India.

They are designated as Other Eligible Community by the State Govt of Kerala.

== Etymology ==
The word Dheevara is of Sanskrit origin, and has been used to describe fishermen in Gautama Dharmasutra and Mahabharata. The Dheevara community was formed by Arayan, Valan and other castes to lobby for the fishers' rights, and to seek caste-based reservations in government jobs. The members of the community formed "Akhila Kerala Dheevara Sabha"(AKDS) andDheevara Mahasabha ("Dheevara Great Assembly"), which are politically powerful organizations.

== Listed castes ==
The following castes are categorized as "Dheevara" in the Government's list of Other Backward Classes:

- Arayan or Araya
- Bovi or Bovis Mogayar
- Arayavathi
- Mogaveera
- Mukaya, Mokaya or Mukayar
- Mukkuvan
- Nulayan
- Koli
- Paniakkal
- Valan
- Valinijiar, Valinjiar or Valinchiar

== See also ==
- Dhimar
- Fishing communities in Maharashtra
- Fishing communities in Kerala
