= Reddy Catholics =

Indian ethnoreligious group

రెడ్డి కతోలికులు (Reddy Katholikulu)

Regions with significant populations
- Rayalaseema, Guntur district, Rangareddy District, Hyderabad Diaspora: United States, Australia, Singapore

Languages
- Telugu

Religion
- Catholicism

Related ethnic groups
- Reddy people, Telugu people

Reddy Catholics (Reddies) are a loose sect or association of Catholics that grew out of the first Christian converts in Andhra Pradesh, India. They generally speak Telugu and often retain some of their Hindu customs. There are branches in many parts of the world.

== History ==
The first convert to Christianity in Andhra Pradesh was Thumma Hanumantha Reddy, also known as Manda Reddy. Manda Reddy, along with thirty Reddy families of Muddiguba and some other Reddy families in Alamuru, embraced Christianity in 1715. In the Rayalaseema region, many Reddies began visiting churches and converted to Christianity (Catholicism). By 1735, in Southern Andhra, there were thousands of Christians, most of whom belonged to the Reddy and traditional weaver communities.

Many Reddies in Guntur district have converted to Roman Catholicism and many still keep some Hindu traditions like Thali and bottus. Some of the Catholic Reddies migrated to Telangana via Krishna River. In Telangana, they named their village as Guntur pally, Reddypuram, or Reddypalem. By 1750, Christianity further spread to the Circar Districts due to the migration of Christian Reddies into those areas. In the early 18th century, many Catholic Reddies had migrated from Rayalaseema to some parts of Tamil Nadu and Telangana.

Reddy Catholics mainly live under

- Roman Catholic Diocese of Kurnool
- Roman Catholic Diocese of Cuddapah
- Roman Catholic Diocese of Guntur
- Roman Catholic Diocese of Chingleput
- Roman Catholic Archdiocese of Hyderabad
- Roman Catholic Archdiocese of Madras and Mylapore
- Roman Catholic Archdiocese of Bangalore

== Migration to Tamil Nadu ==
The Catholics belonging to Reddy community settled in the bordering villages of Andhra Pradesh and Tamilnadu.

== See also ==
- Goan Catholics
- Telugu Christians
- Christianity in Tamil Nadu
- Mangalorean Catholics of Carnataca
- Latin Catholics of Malabar
- Bombay East Indian Catholics
- Kamma Catholic Christians
