= Dhimar =

Hindu caste

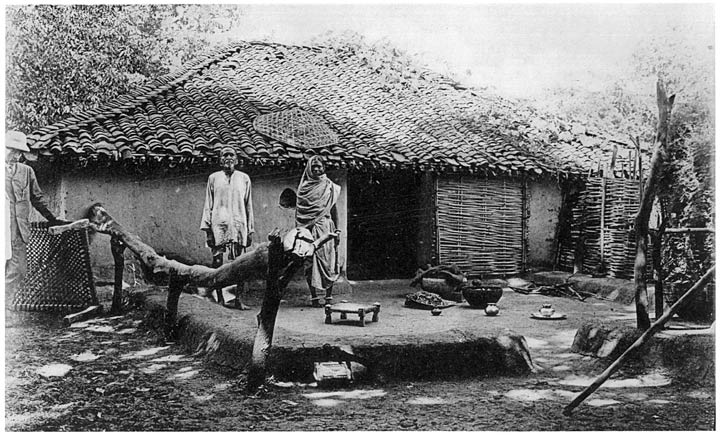
- Dhimar or fisherman’s hut. (Russell, 1916)

Regions with significant populations
- Madhya Pradesh, Chattisgarh, Maharashtra, Odisha, Gujarat and Delhi.

Religion
- Hinduism

The Dhimar is a Hindu caste in Central India. The term Dhimar originates from the Sanskrit word "Dhivara," which means a fisherman. Dhimars are also known as Kahar, Bhoi, Palewar, Baraua, and Machhandar.

Historically, Dhimars have primarily worked as the fishermen. Dhimars primarily reside in the states of Madhya Pradesh, Chattisgarh, Maharashtra, Odisha, Gujarat and Delhi.

Communities that are related to the Dhimar by occupation include Kanshilya, Koshyal, Dhinwar, Jhinwar, Dhewar, Jhimar, Kashyap, Kahar. Dhimars sometimes referred to as a sub-caste of boatmen.

== Affirmative action status ==
There were proposals in 2013 that some or all of these communities in the state should be reclassified as Scheduled Castes under India's system of positive discrimination; this would have involved declassifying them from the Other Backwards Class category. Whether or not this would happen was a significant issue in the campaign for the 2014 Indian general election.

== See also ==
- Mallaah
