= Varapuzha Basilica =

Catholic church in India

- Basilica of Our Lady of Mount Carmel and Saint Joseph
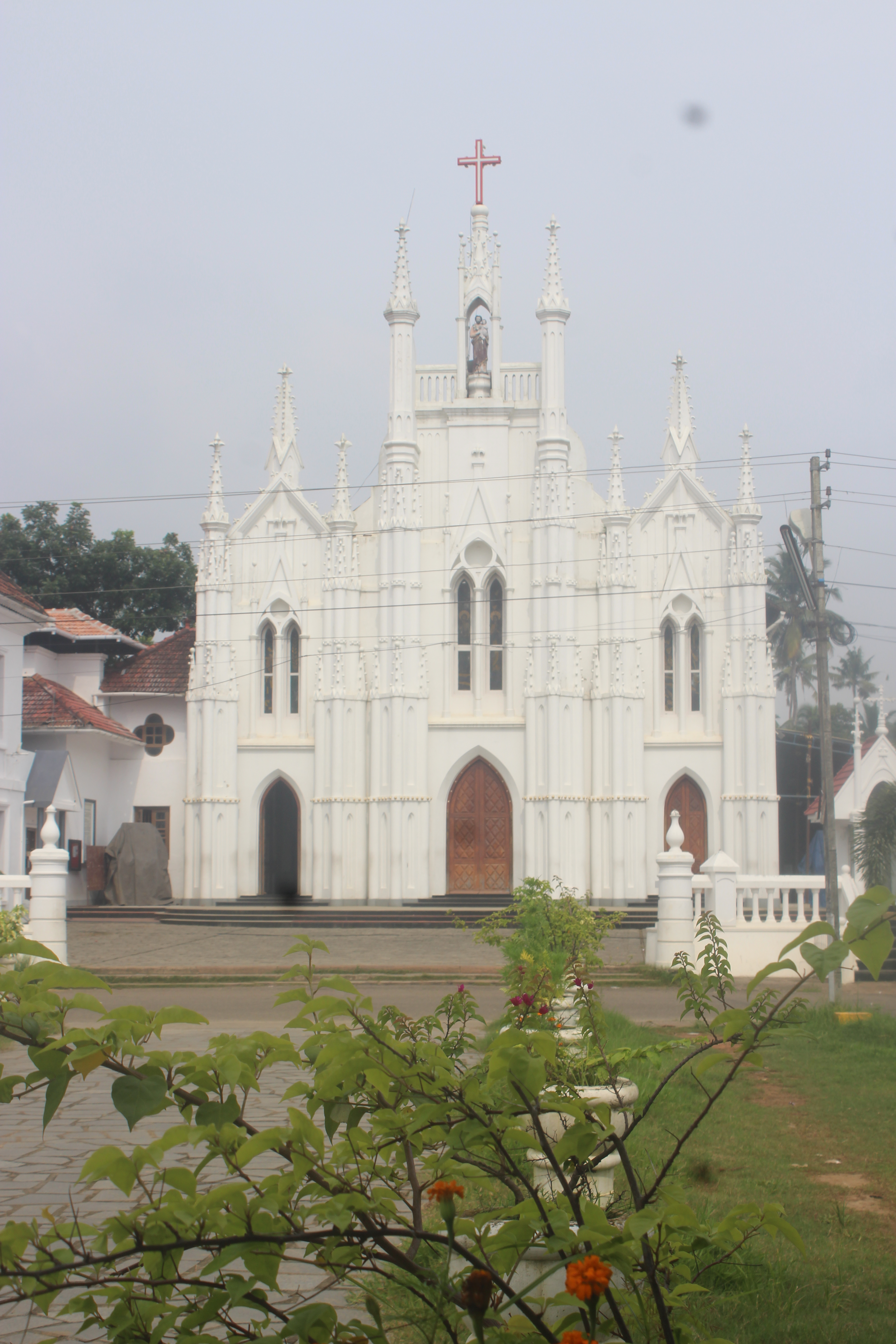
- Varapuzha Basilica
- Location: Varapuzha, Ernakulam district, Kerala
- Country: India
- Denomination: Catholic Church
- Sui iuris church: Latin Church
- Website: www.varapuzhabasilica.org

History
- Former name(s): Cathedral of Our lady of Mount Carmel and St Joseph
- Status: minor basilica, parish
- Founded: 1673
- Founder: Matheus of St Joseph
- Dedication: Our Lady of Mount Carmel, Saint Joseph
- Dedicated: 17 November 1673

Architecture
- Functional status: active
- Architectural type: Gothic architecture

Administration
- Province: St. Pius X Manjummel Province of Discalced Carmelites
- Diocese: Roman Catholic Archdiocese of Verapoly
- Deanery: Koonanmmavu, St.Philomena's Forane Church, Koonammavu
- Parish: Basilica of Our Lady of Mount Carmel and Saint Joseph

Clergy
- Archbishop: Joseph Kalathiparambil
- Priest: Joshy George

The Basilica of Our Lady of Mount Carmel and Saint Joseph, popularly known as Varapuzha Basilica, is in Varapuzha, a northern suburban town of Kochi City in the Ernakulam district of Kerala state, India. It was built in 1673. The solemnity of the Assumption of Mary is celebrated as an annual sixteen-day confraternity festival, from 31 July to 15 August. The basilica is also a pilgrimage centre in the southern part of India. It serves as the mother church for 14 churches.

== History ==
This church was the seat of the metropolitans until 1904. The headquarters was then shifted to the town of Ernakulam, for easier administration. As the original seat of the Latin bishop, the church holds a unique place in the history of Latin Catholics in the area. Presently the church offers solace to the faithful who gather there for the powerful intercessions of Our Lady and Saint Joseph.

In 1653 Mathew of Saint Joseph reached Goa as a missionary. The old Varapuzha Church was built in 1673. On 20 February 1700 Pope Clement appointed the Carmelite missionary Angelus Francis as the Vicar Apostolic Malabar. All those who guided the life and activities of the Church from 1700 AD to 1886 AD were known as Apostolic vicars. On 13 March 1709 the Holy See suppressed the Malabar Vicariate, and the Varapuzha Vicariate was erected officially. In 1886 the Varapuzha Vicariate was raised to the status of archdiocese. Until 1904, Varapuzha was the official residence of the Archbishops of Varapuzha. From 1886 onwards the bishops took charge and care of the diocese of Varapuzha from this place named "Varapuzha".

On 1 September 1886 the Varapuzha Vicariate was officially raised to the status of archdiocese, and Rev. Dr. Leonardo Mellano OCD was consecrated as the first archbishop of the Archdiocese of Varapuzha.

In those years the Varapuzha Church was the only Catholic Church of this locality. At that time this was the home to all the Syrian Catholics of this locality.

The Carmelite missionary Paulinus (from 1744 to 1780) describes this church in his book India Orientalis Christiana as the "Church of Latin and Chaldean rites". The church has two patron saints, Saint Joseph resulted from the special devotion of its founder, Mathew of Saint Joseph.

The old church underwent a major uplift and reconstruction in 1927 when its old front doom collapsed in 1919.

In 1886 the Archdiocese of Varapuzha was established, and the church became the cathedral church of the archdiocese. This status remained with the church until 1936, when Saint Francis Cathedral was built in Ernakulam. The church is the final resting place of 28 Carmelite missionaries, including eight bishops of the Diocese of Varapuzha.

When Tipu Sultan (1750–1799), the Muslim conqueror, attacked, plundered and killed many, Varapuzha was providentially left out being an island, but it became the place of refuge for all from all religions and castes. The Carmelite missionaries took care of all of them.

In 1682 the Carmelite missionaries of Varapuzha requested the Propaganda Fidei for the construction of a seminary for the formation of the indigenous clergy.

In 1685 the seminary was closed down. A new seminary was built in 1766 in Varapuzha. At that time it accepted candidates from both Latin and Syrian rites.

In 1790 this seminary was closed following the attack of Tipu Sultan. The seminary was reopened in 1832. In 1866 the Syrians were shifted to the Puthenpally Seminary.

From 1659 to 1904, sixteen bishops and two archbishops guided the diocese from this place. In those days all travels and transportation were through water.

In a letter dated 11 December 2020, the office of the Congregation for Divine Worship and the Discipline of the Sacraments approved the application of the Archdiocese of Verapoly to elevate the status of the former cathedral of Varapuzha to a minor basilica. As a minor basilica, it will be one of only 28 nationwide and 10th in Kerala, and the first one in the country to be named after St Joseph.

== Blessed Eliswa of Blessed Virgin Mary TOCD ==
The tomb of Blessed Eliswa Vakayil (1831–1913), the foundress of the first indigenous Carmelite congregations (CTC and CMC) in Saint Joseph's convent, Varapuzha, is here.

== Gallery ==
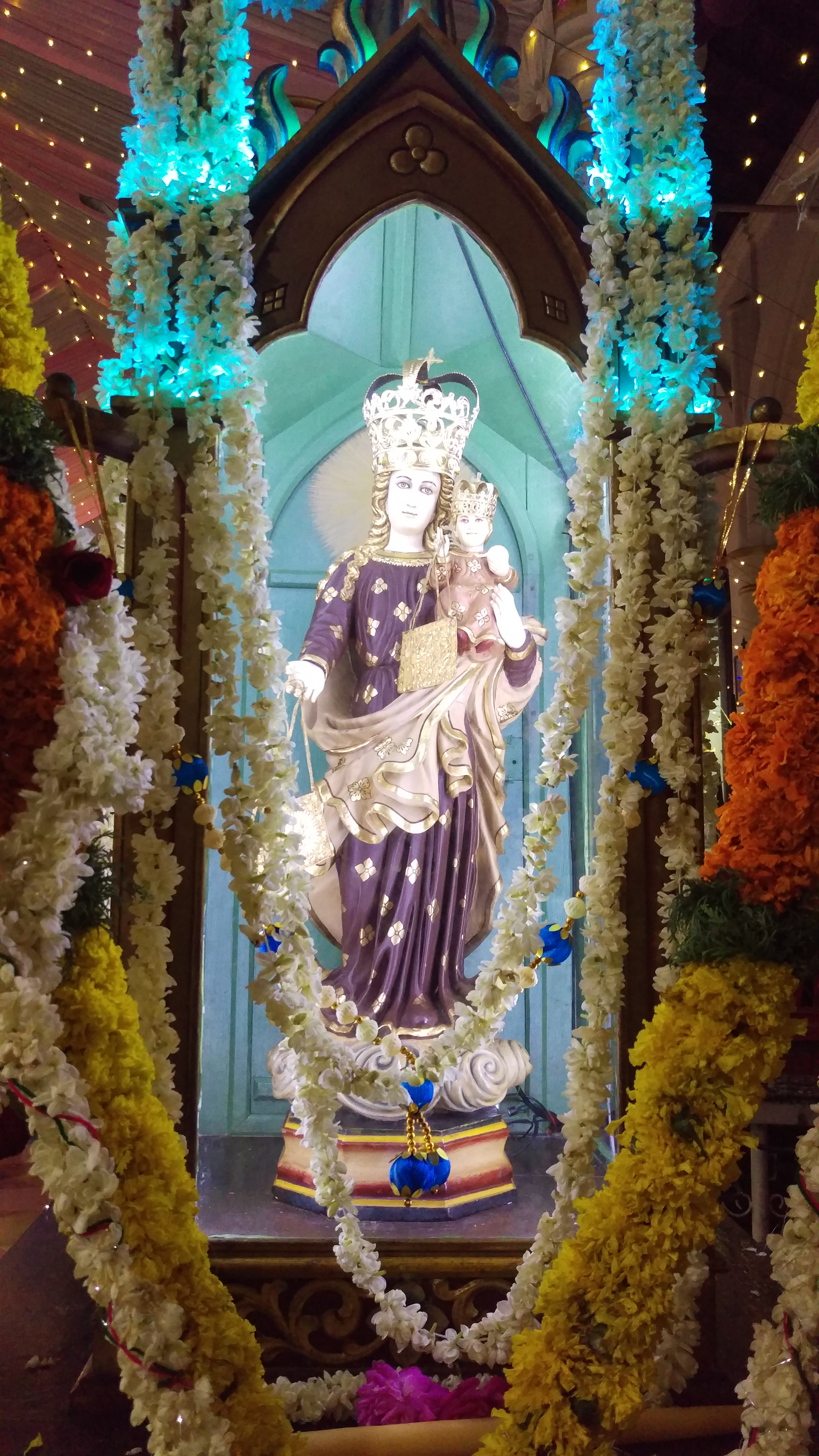
Miraculous image of Our Lady of Mount Carmel

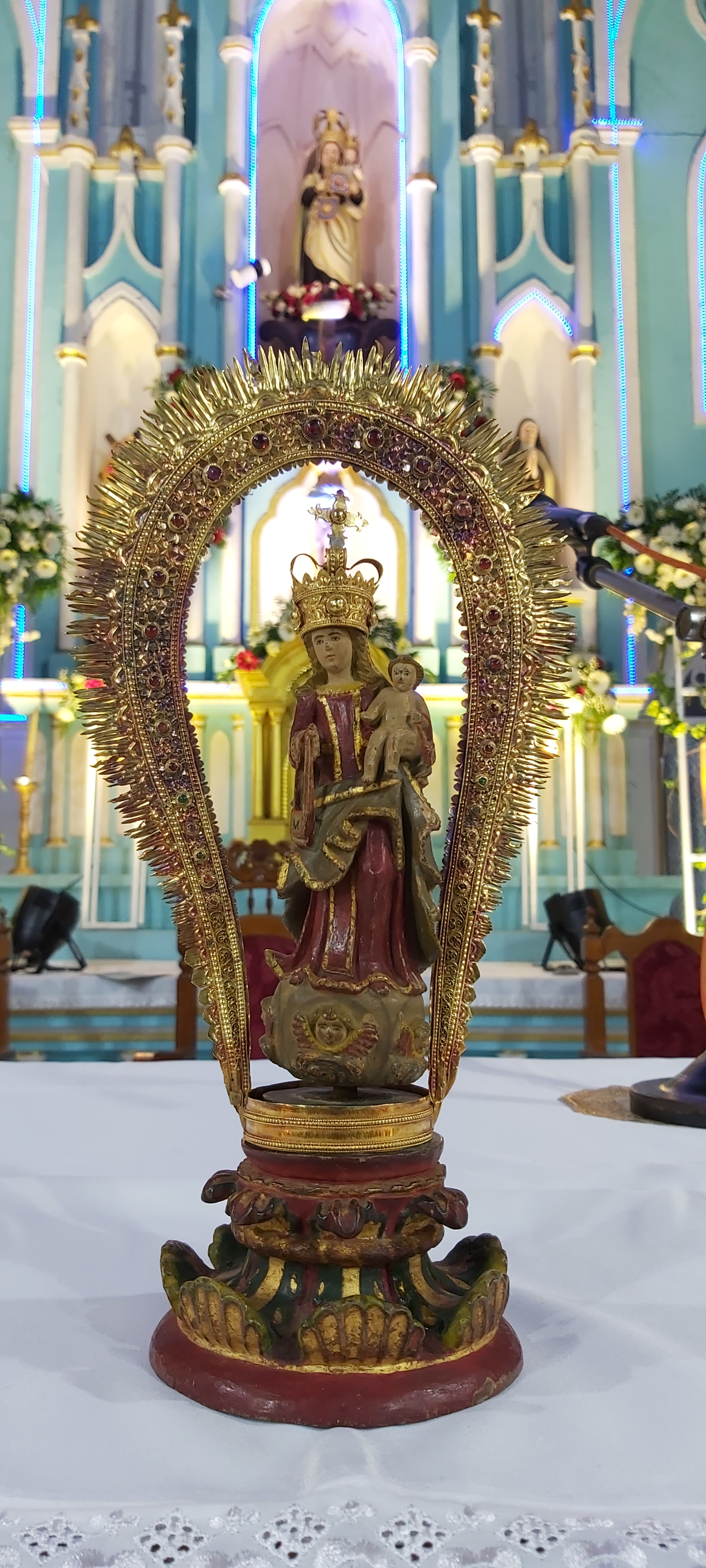
Salve statue of Our Lady of Mount Carmel

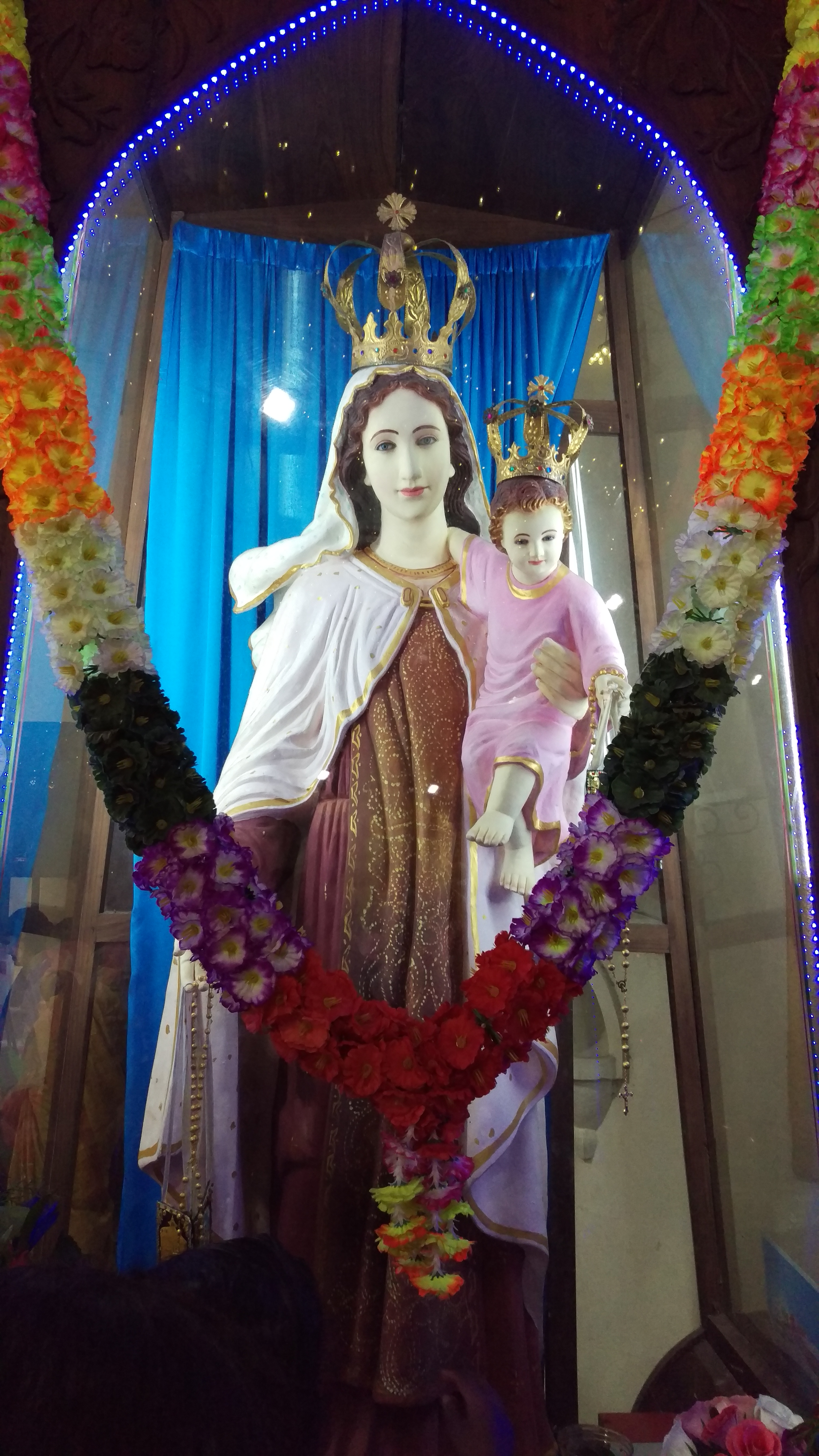
Varapuzhamma

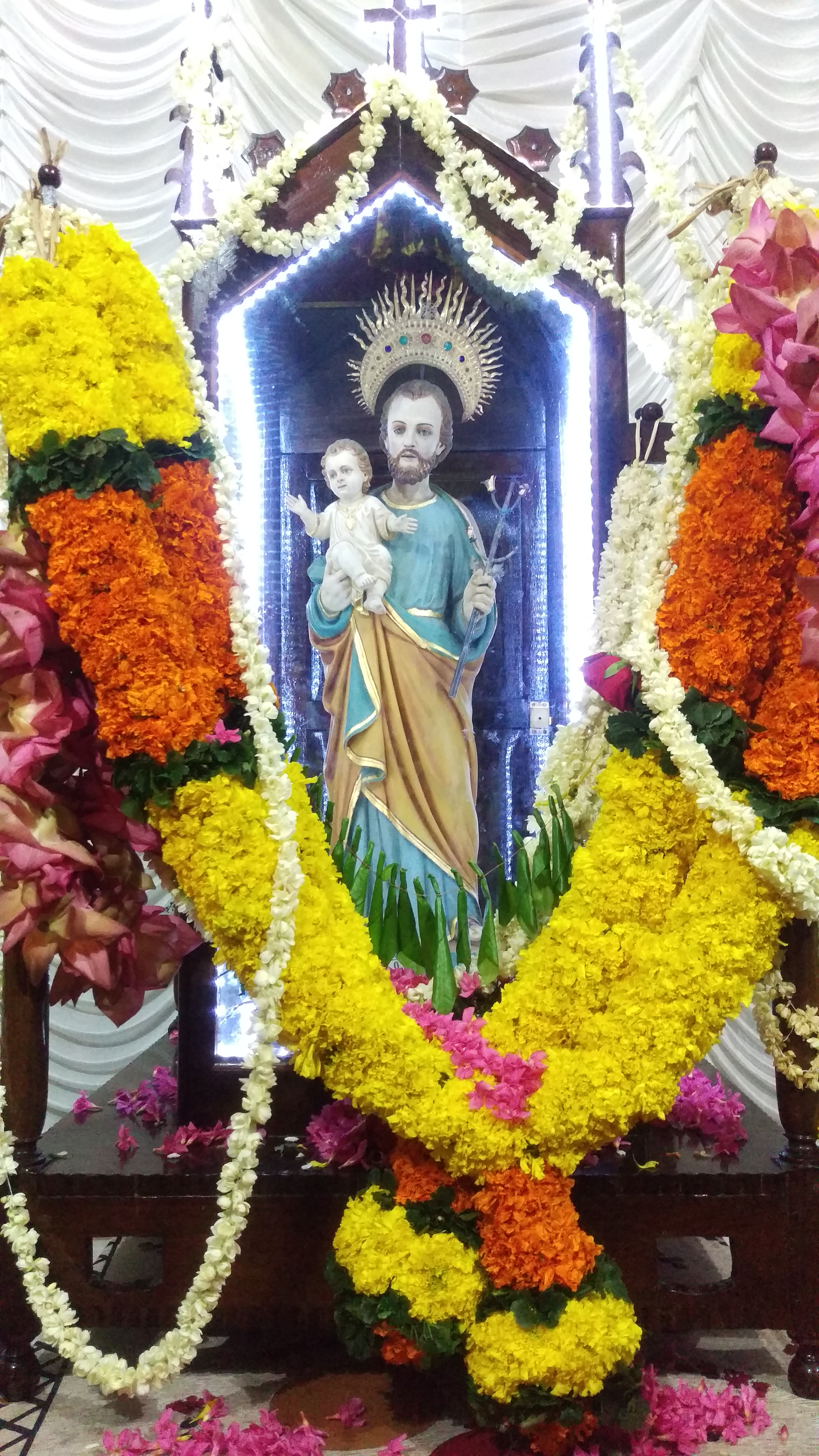
Miraculous image of Saint Joseph

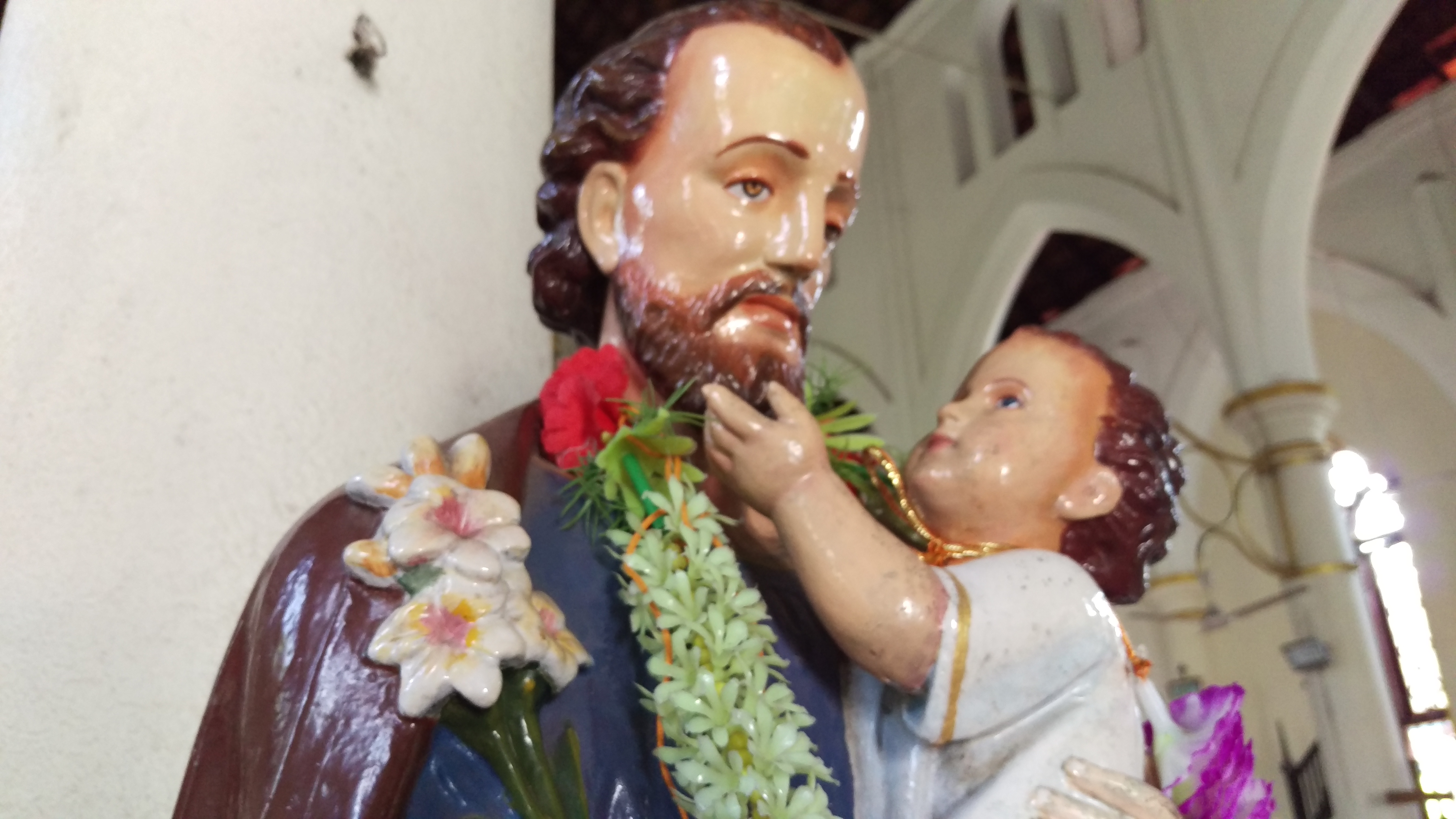
Saint Joseph

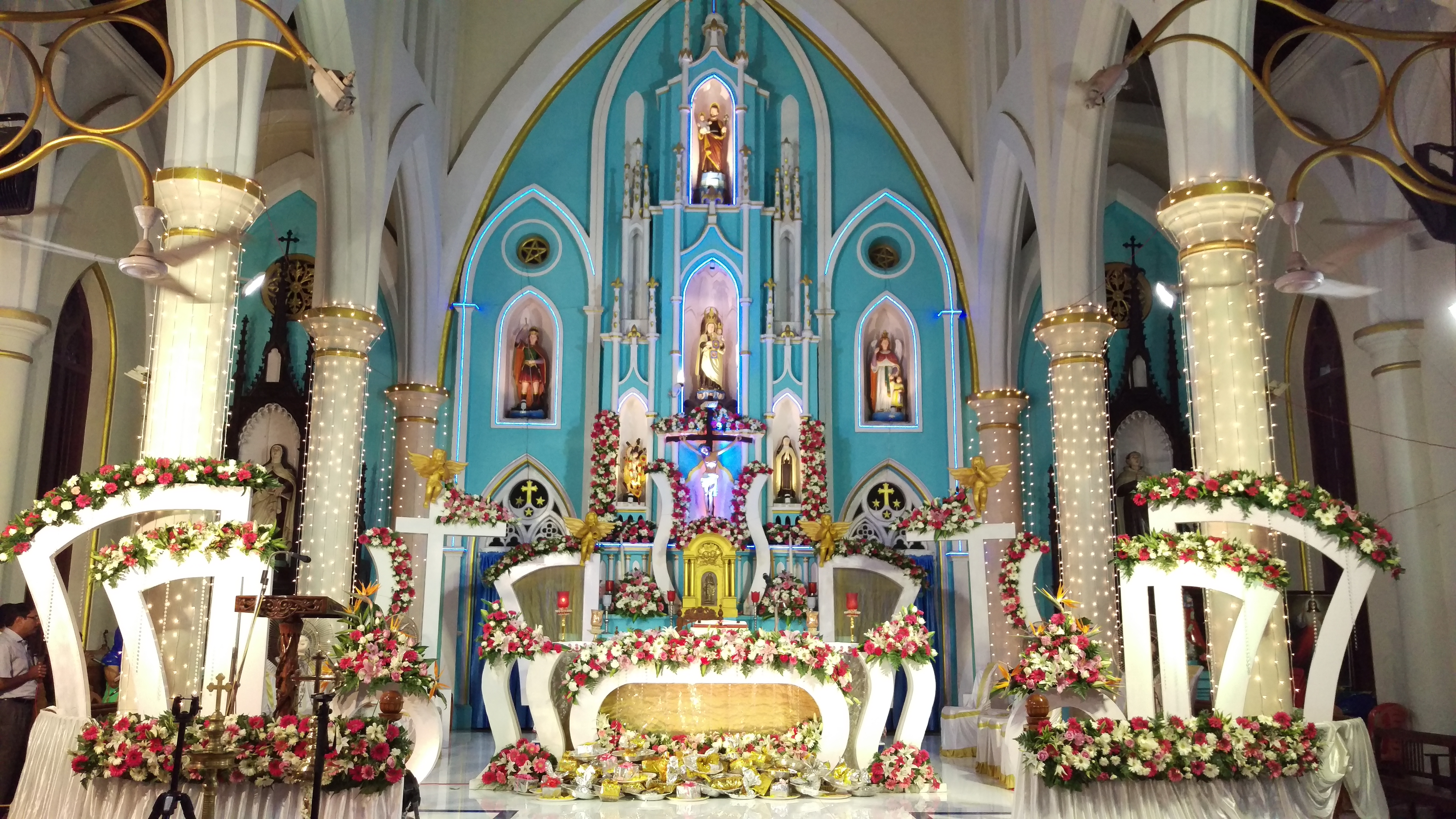
Old Altar of Varapuzha Basilica

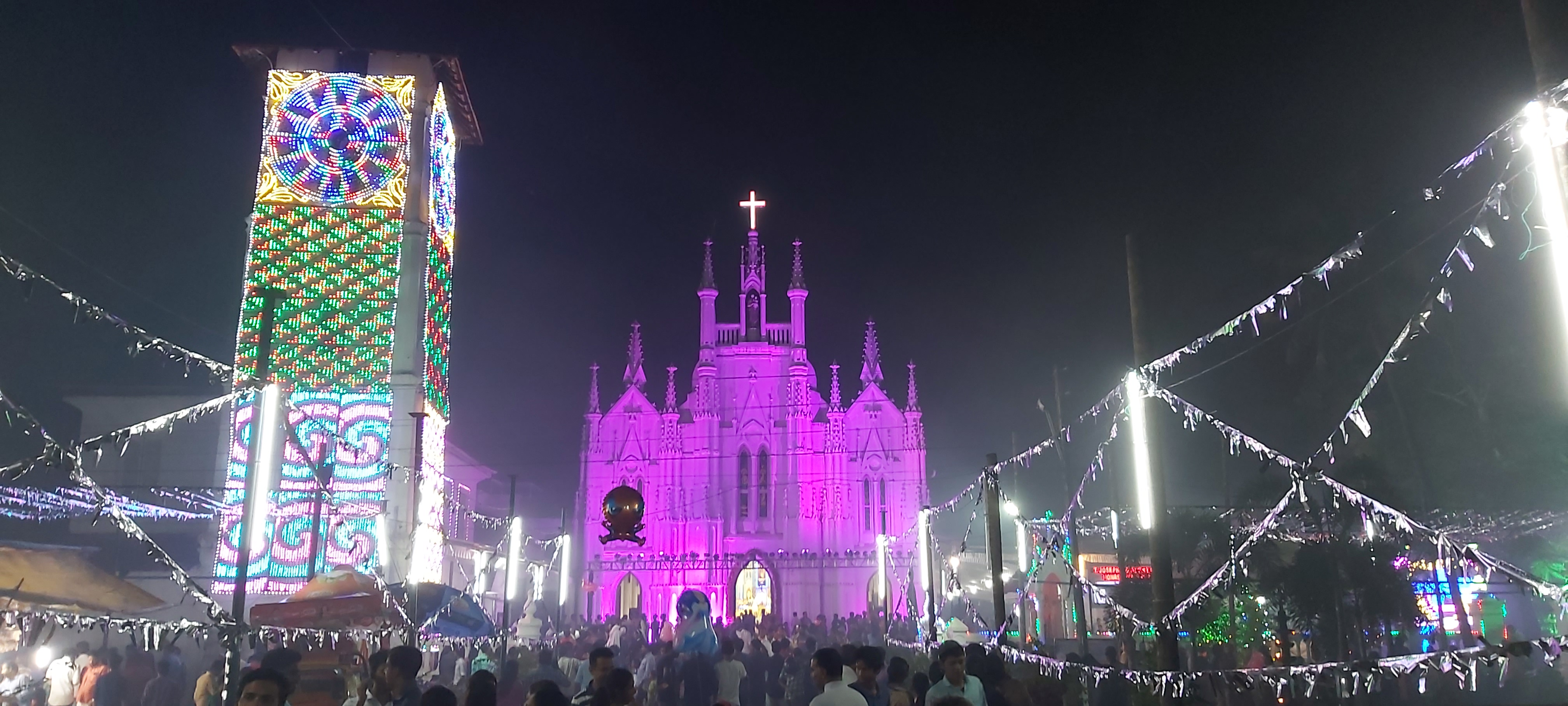
Churchfeast 2019

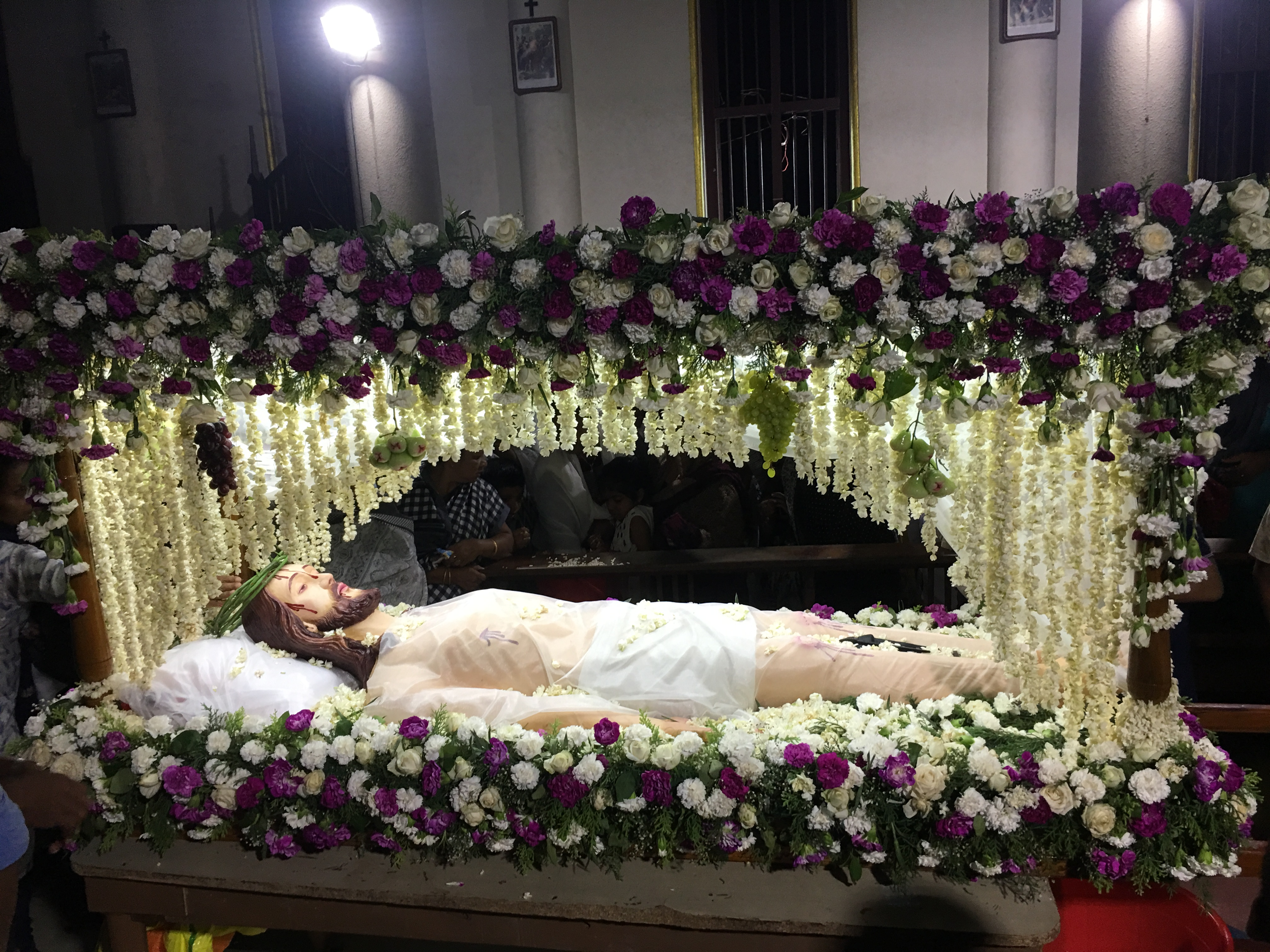
Santo Entierro

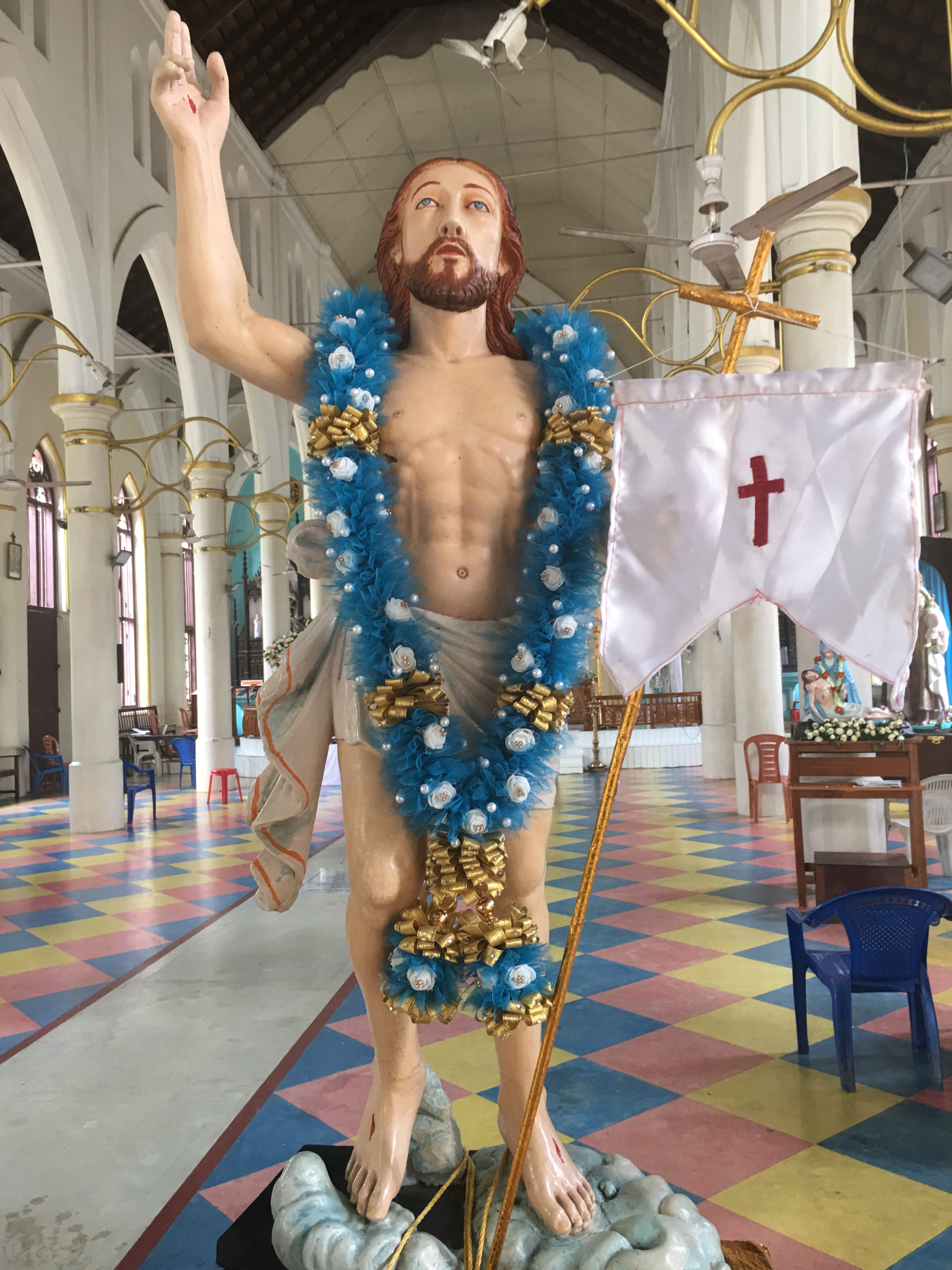
Risen Lord

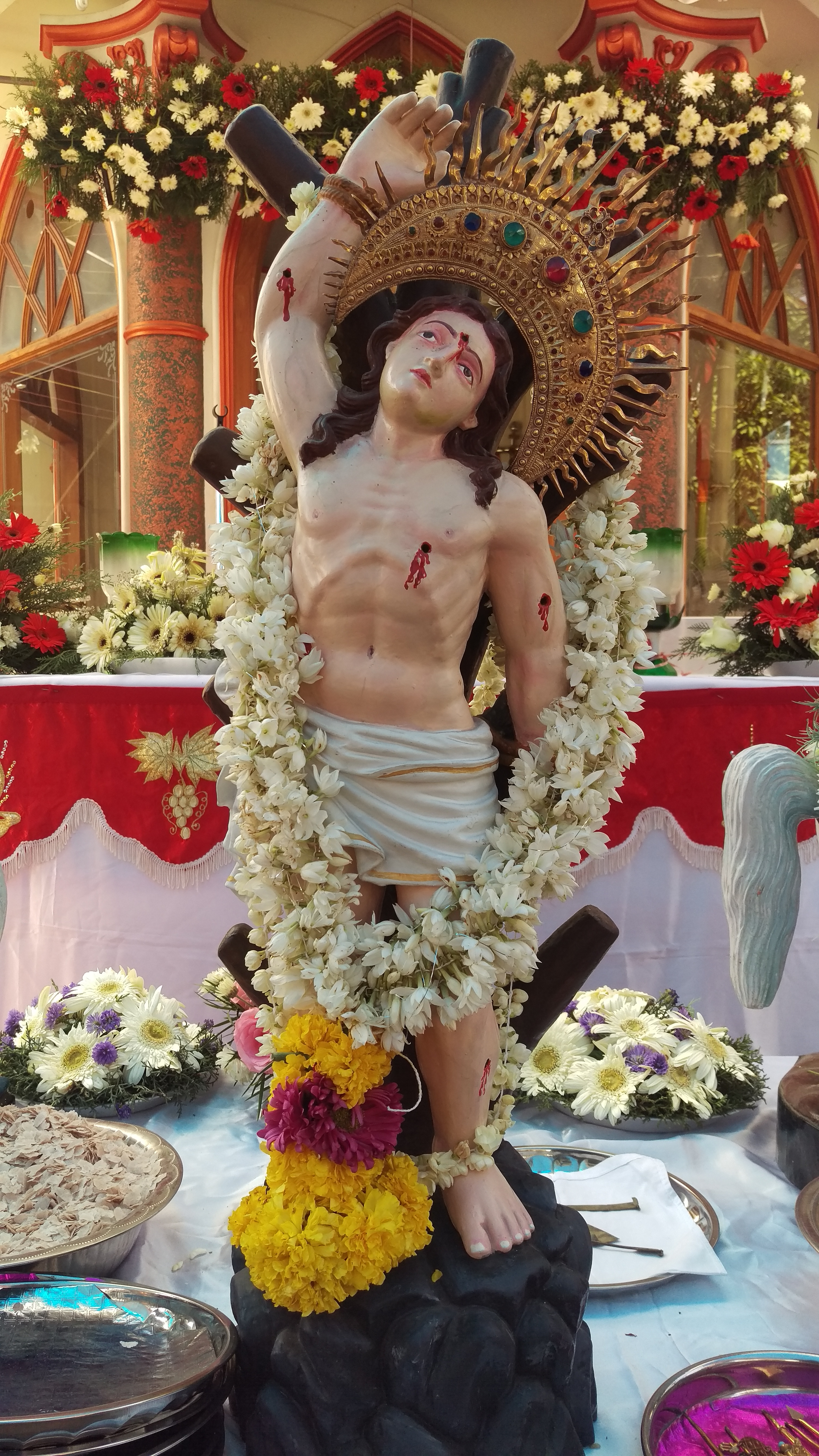
St Sebastian

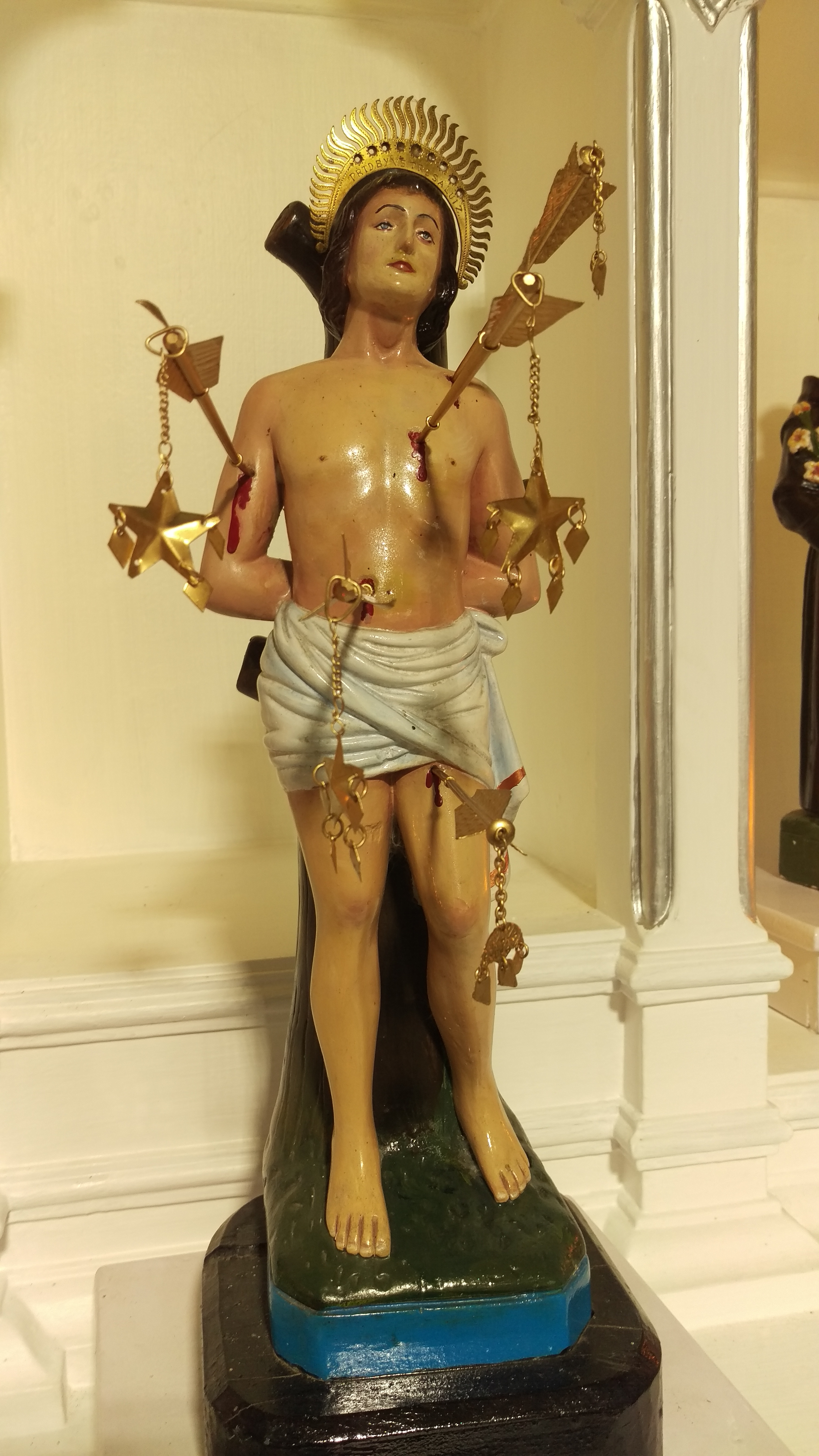
St Sebastian Karikattuthuruth

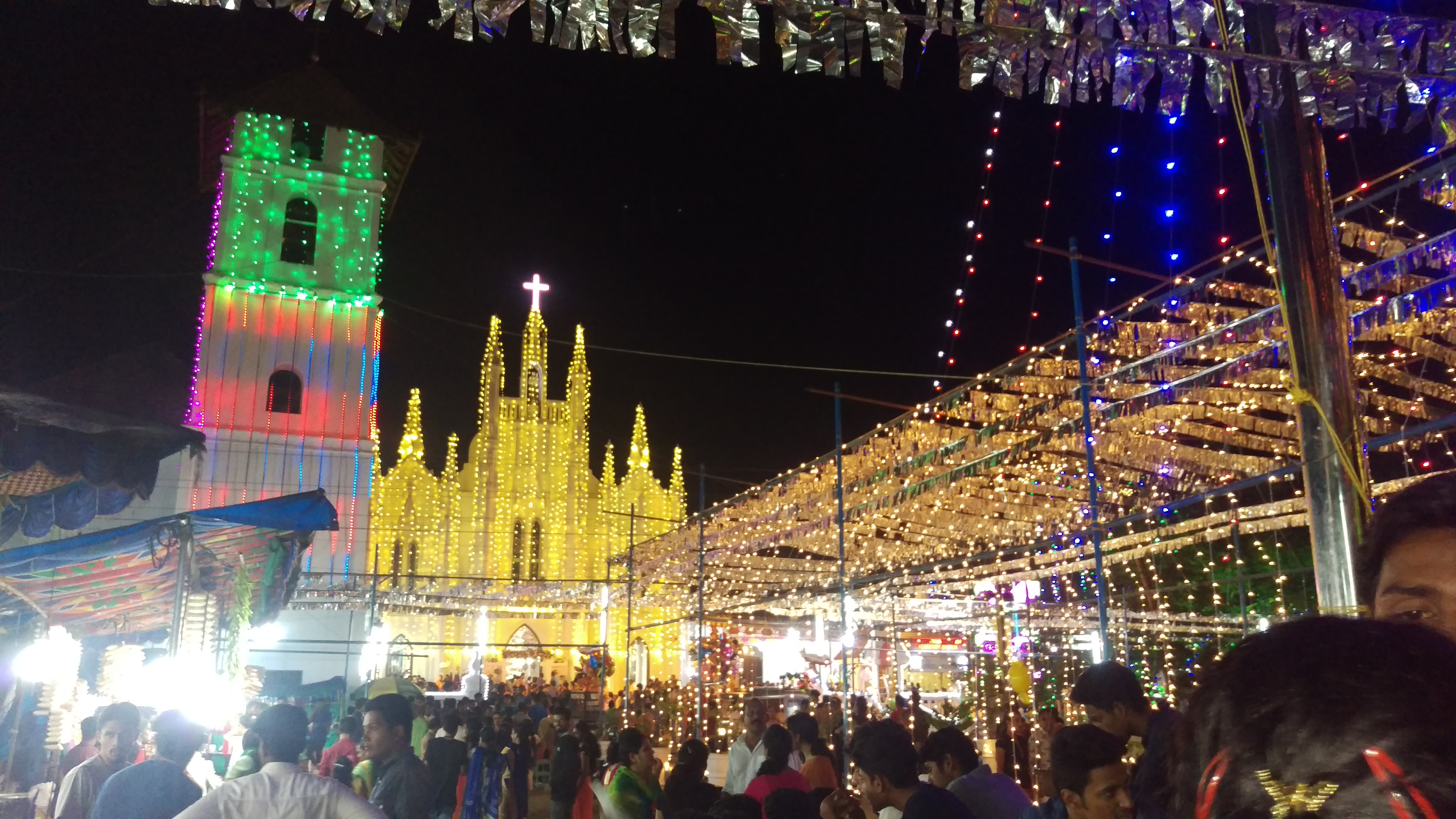
Church Feast

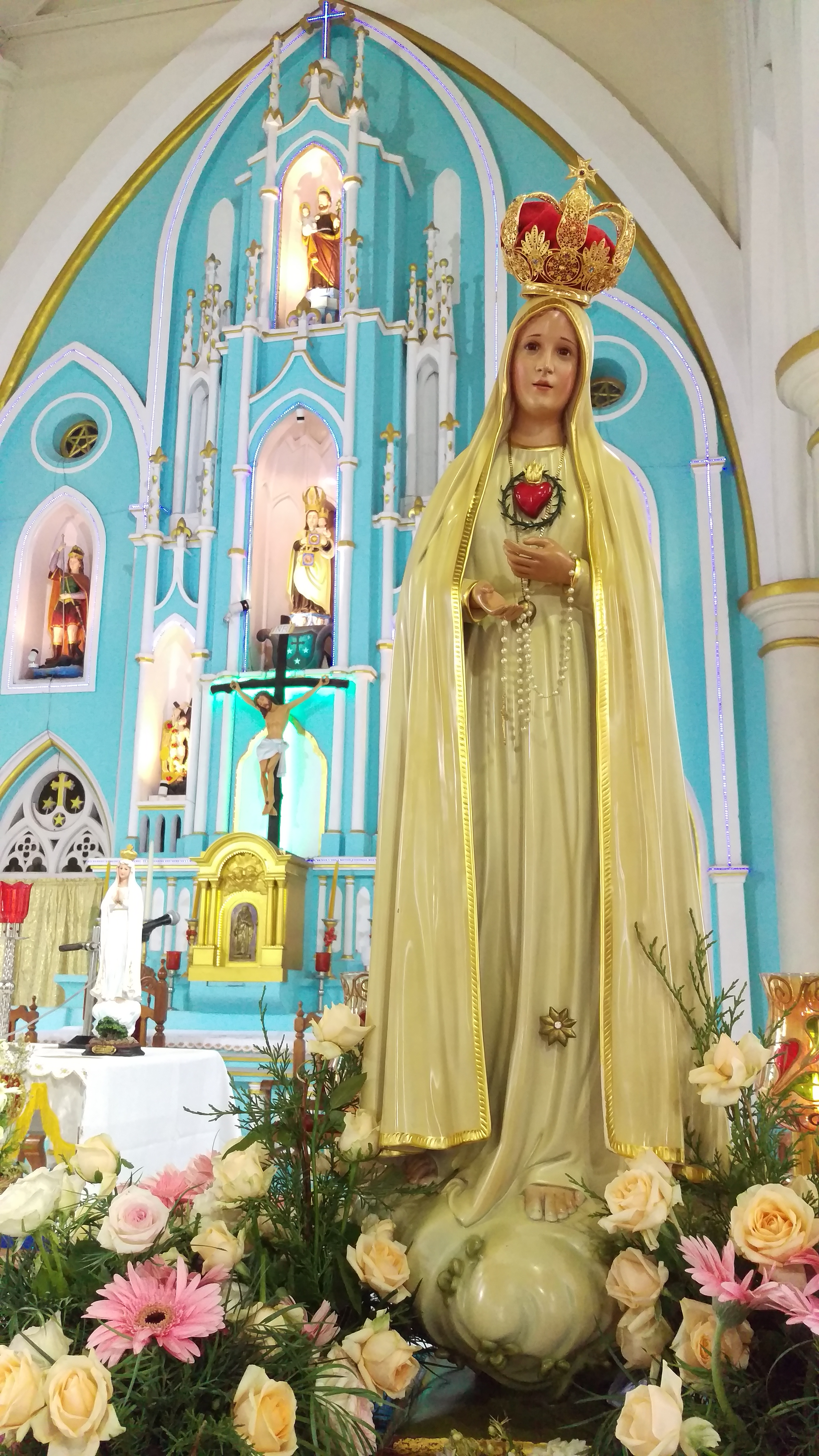
Fatima@Varapuzha

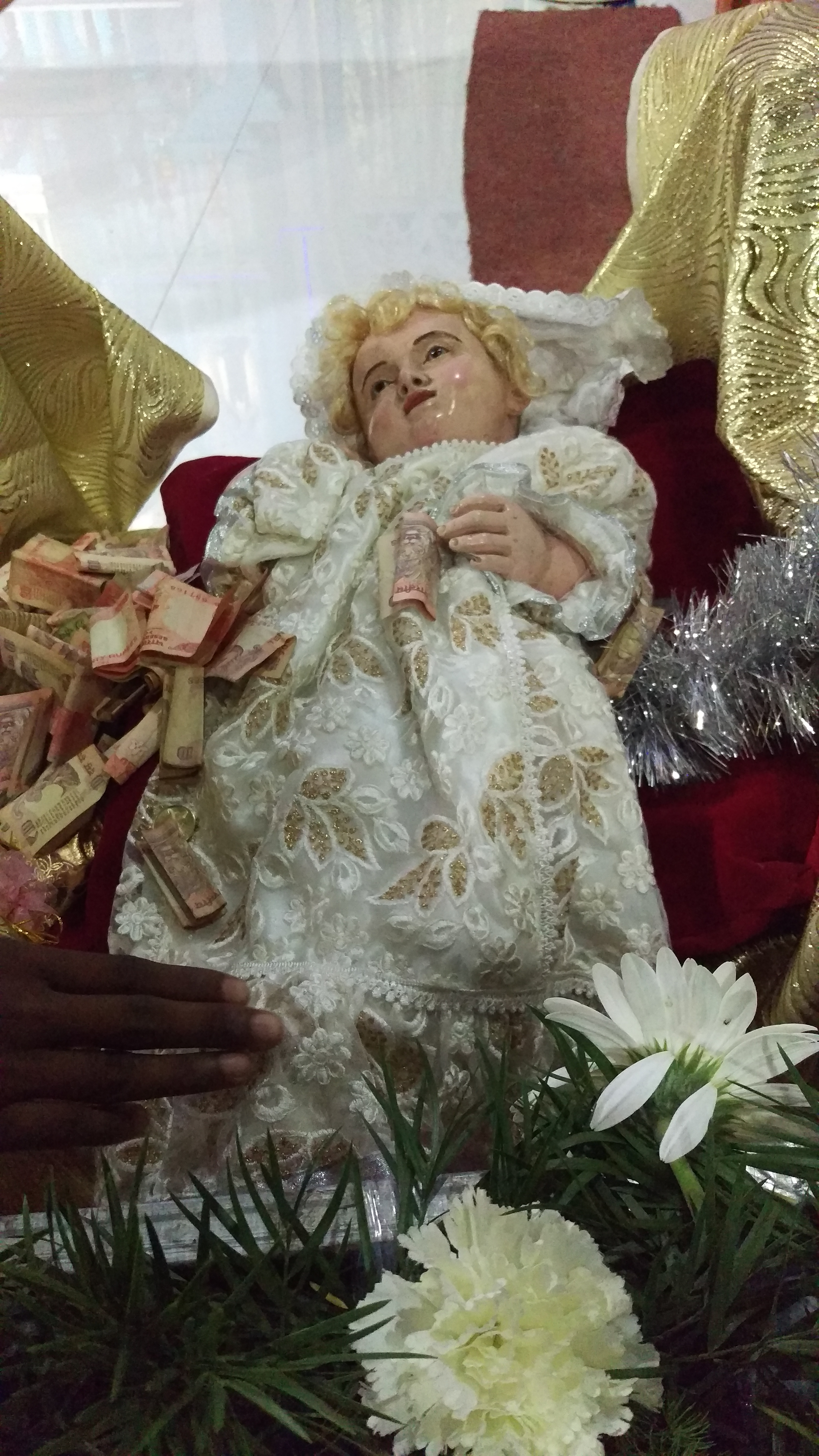
Gesu Bambino

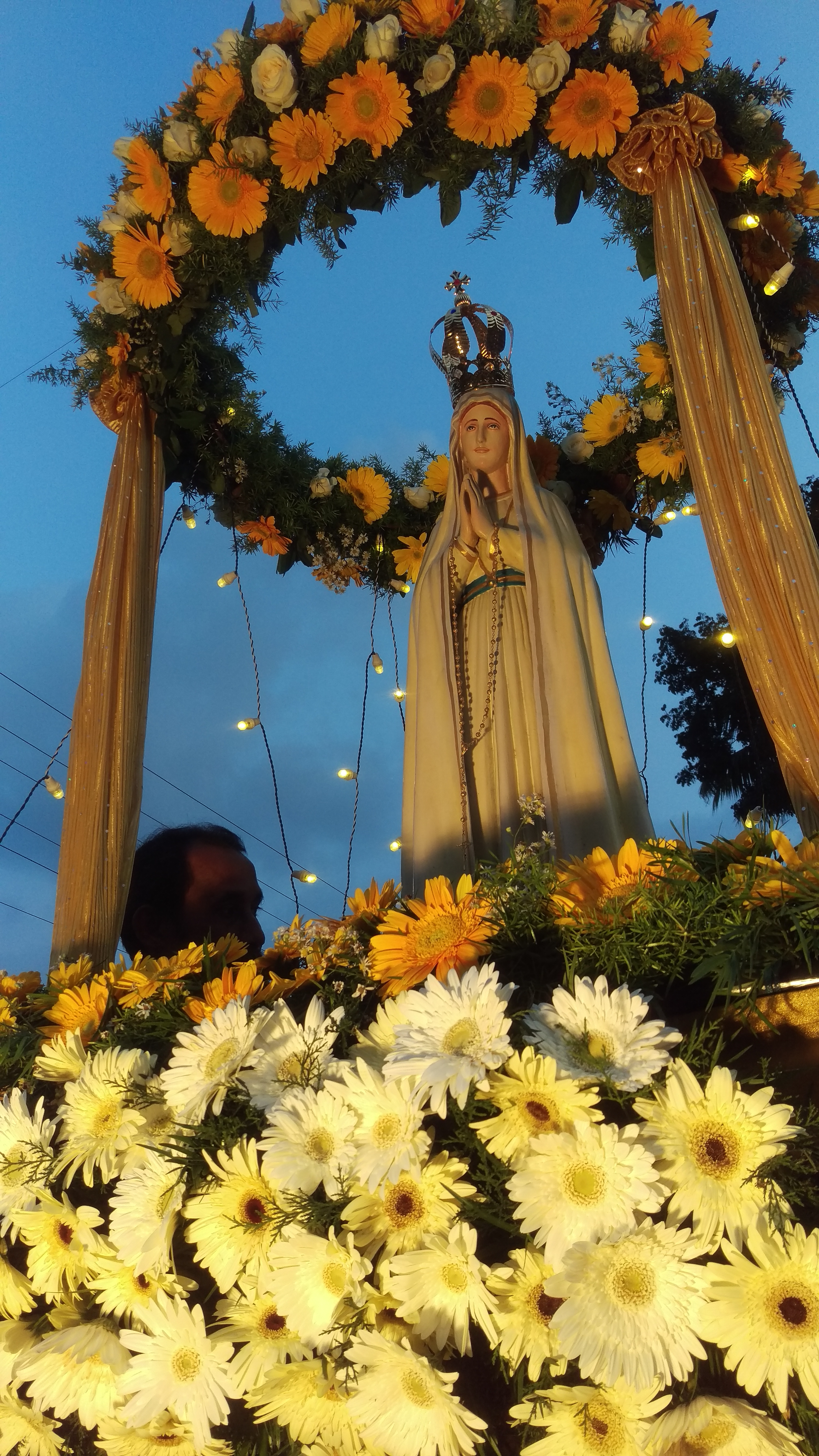
Rosary month Celebrations

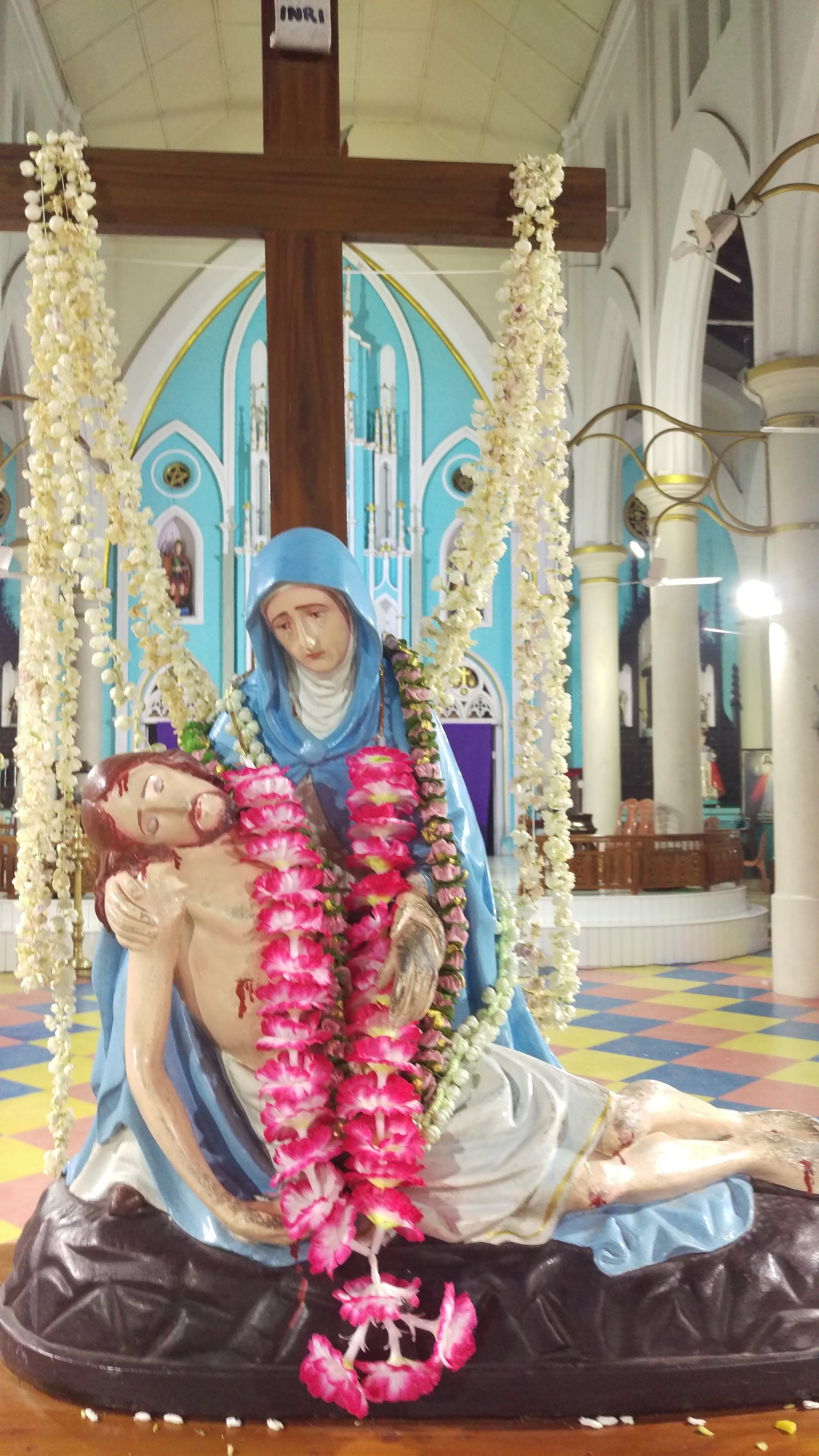
Ancient Statue of Our Lady of Dolours

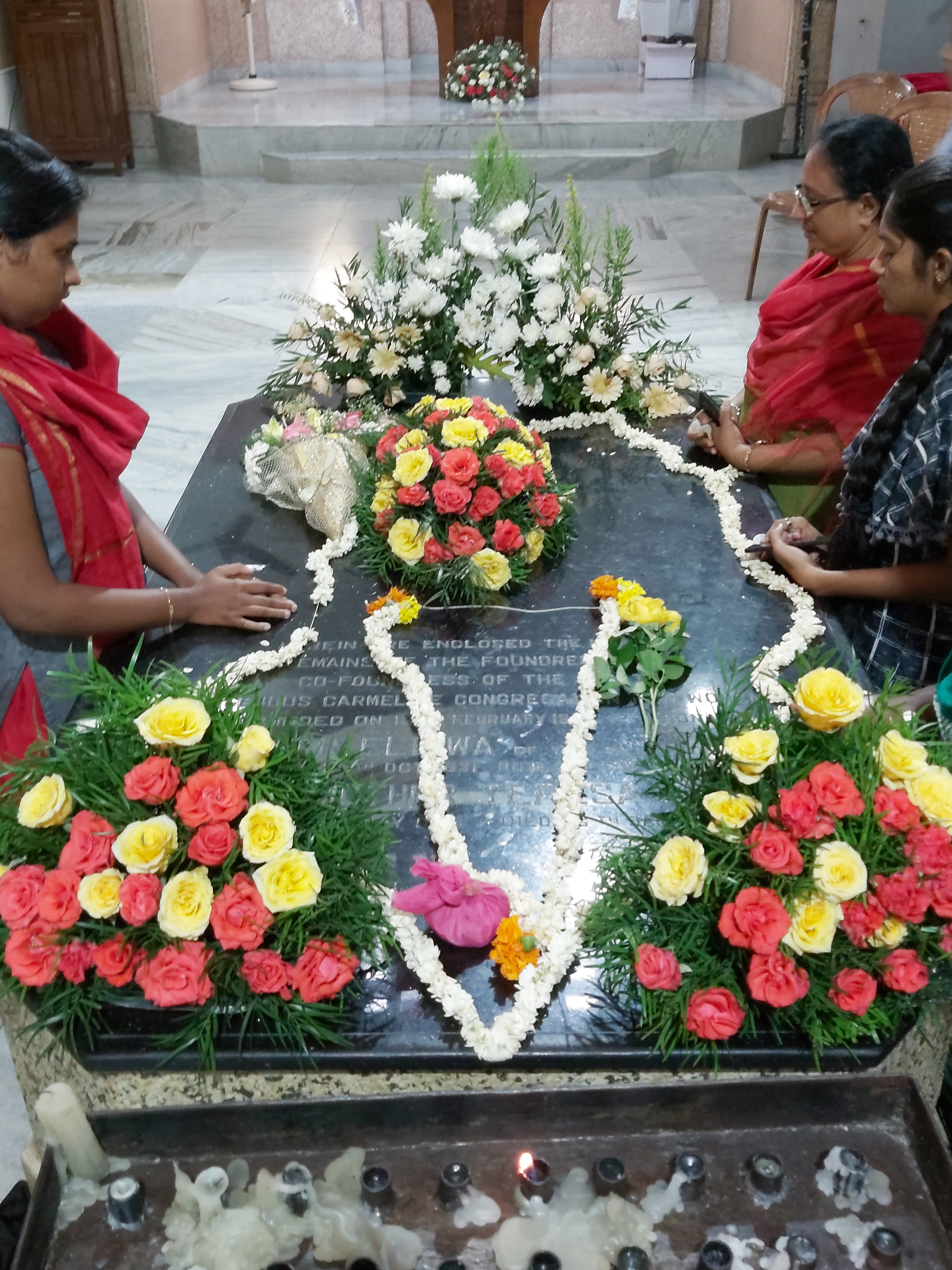
Tomb of Venerable Eliswa Vakayil

== See also ==
- Roman Catholic Archdiocese of Verapoly
- Basilica of Our Lady of Good Health, Velankanni
- Basilica of Our Lady of Ransom, Vallarpadam
- St. Philomena's Forane Church & St. Chavara Pilgrimage Centre
