= St. Philomena's Forane Church, Koonammavu =

- Koonammavu Church
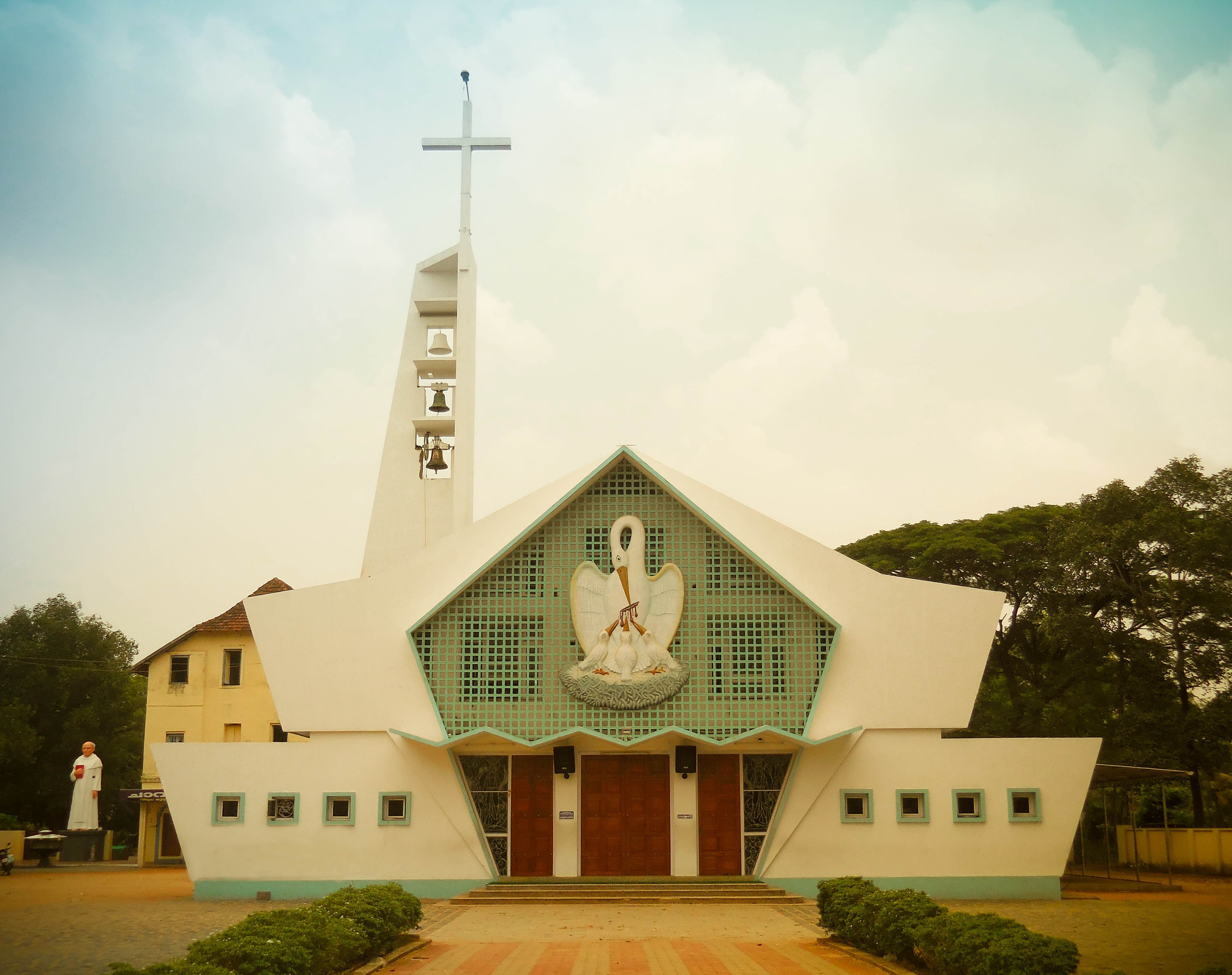
- St. Kuriakose Elias Chavara Pilgrimage Centre

- Location within Kerala
- 10.099901°N 76.265577°E
- Location: (India) , Koonammavu, Kochi, Kerala-683518
- Country: India
- Denomination: Roman Catholic Latin Rite
- Churchmanship: High Church
- Website: www.stphilomenaschurchkoonammavu.org www.verapoly.in www.archdiocese.in/church

History
- Status: Forane, Pilgrimage
- Founded: 1837; 189 years ago

Architecture
- Functional status: Active

Administration
- District: VII
- Province: Verapoly
- Archdiocese: Roman Catholic Archdiocese of Verapoly

Clergy
- Archbishop: Dr. Joseph Kalathiparambil
- Rector: Fr. Dixon Fernandez
- Vicar: Fr. Dixon Fernandez

St. Philomena's Forane Church, popularly known as Koonammavu Church is situated in Koonammavu, a northern suburban town of Kochi City of Kerala state, India. This is one of the oldest Roman Catholic churches in India, built in 1837 AD. Even though the church is dedicated to the Virgin Philomena, Saint Chavara Achan's feast is celebrated in every year as the annual festival, a nine-day festival lasting from 26 December to 3 January along with Holy Christmas and the New Year. The church is also popular among non-Christians as a pilgrimage centre and this seventh Forane of Roman Catholic Metropolitan Archdiocese of Verapoly serves as the Catholic Forane Church of 12 churches listed below.

1. Church of Our Lady of Velankanni, Chariyamthuruth
2. Christ the King Church-Christnagar, Varapuzha
3. St. Antony's Church, Kongorpilly, Koonammavu.
4. Church of Our Lady of Rosary, Maloth, Koonammavu
5. Church of Our Lady of Nativity, Muttinakam, Varapuzha
6. St. Joseph's Church, Neerikode, Alangad.
7. Little Flower Church, Panayikulam
8. Sacred Heart Church, Thevarkad, Varapuzha.
9. Infant Jesus Church, Thundathumkadavu, Varapuzha.
10. Amalolbhavamatha Church, Valluvally, Koonammavu
11. Our Lady of Mount Carmel and St. Joseph's Minor Basilica, Varapuzha
12. St. Antony's Church, Chennur, Varapuzha.

== See also ==
- Roman Catholic Archdiocese of Verapoly
- Basilica of Our Lady of Good Health
- National Shrine Basilica of Our Lady of Ransom, Vallarpadam
- Our Lady of Mount Carmel and St. Joseph's Minor Basilica, Varapuzha
- Our Lady of Immaculate Conception Church, Manjummel
- Latin Church
- Catholic particular churches and liturgical rites
