= Valan =

Valans are a Malayali caste based in Kerala, India. They are mostly based in Kerala and Tamil Nadu.

== Etymology ==
The name is derived from val, which refers to tank or pond fish, denoting the community engaged in catching them.

== Origin and clans ==
According to local legend, the Valan were brought by Parashurama to navigate boats on rivers and along the seashore. Another account states that they were originally Aryans who were granted certain rights by a Perumal king and brought to Kerala to work as ferrymen.

There are no sub-castes within the Valan community. However, they are divided into four lineages or clans named Alayakkad, Ennalu, Vaishyagiriyam, and Varhapalli. Members of the community reside in huts along the seashore, though some houses are constructed from bricks or stones.

Another tradition is that the Valans were Arayans, and they became a separate caste only after one of the Perumal had selected some of their families for boat service, and conferred on them special privileges. They pride themselves that their caste is one of remote antiquity, and claim that ancient members included Vyasa, author of the Vishnu Purana, and Guhan, the legendary boatman who assisted Rama.

== Religious beliefs and festivals ==
The Valan worship deities such as Rama, Krishna, Shiva, and Vishnu. Their primary deity is Bhagavati, who is worshipped on Tuesdays and Fridays. Offerings made to Bhagavati during worship include toddy, bananas, chickens, and tender coconuts.

The community annually celebrates a major festival called Kumbhom Bharani in honor of Bhagavati during the month of Phalguna. Large gatherings of people from regions such as Malabar, Cochin, and Travancore attend this festival. Members of the Nair community and other castes offer roosters to the deity to ensure safety and prosperity in the coming year.

At Chengannur, the Makar Vilakku festival is celebrated on the first day of the month of Makaram (14 January). During the night, lamps illuminate the inside and outside of the temple, and decorated elephants are paraded around the temple accompanied by music.

The Valan perform ancestor worship on the Sankranti days of Karkadakam, Thulam, and Makaram. They also celebrate Shivaratri at the end of the month of Maagha, as well as festivals such as Onam and Dussehra.

== Social customs and marriage ==
When a girl attains her first menstruation, she is secluded in a room for four days. During this period, women of her caste and a washerwoman apply sesame oil and turmeric to her body. These four days are regarded as a period of ritual impurity.

Marriages are arranged during a girl's childhood or upon reaching puberty. The tying of the tali is a mandatory custom; failure to conduct this ritual results in the excommunication of the girl's parents from the caste. To perform the ritual, the girl's relatives visit the caste head, known as the Aravan, and offer betel leaves along with a monetary fee (*dakshina*) to obtain permission. On the appointed night, the groom's party visits the bride's house, where the groom ties the tali around her neck. The boy who ties the tali is not required to marry the girl later. However, if he chooses to marry her, his parents bear the cost of the tali and other wedding expenses; otherwise, these expenses are paid by the girl's maternal uncle.

Horoscope matching is practiced prior to marriage. On the wedding day, the groom's party brings two pieces of cloth, one or one and a half rupees, rice, and betel leaves to the bride's house. One piece of cloth is presented to the bride's mother. Subsequently, the bride's party visits the groom's home, distributes sweets, and formally announces the marriage.

Widows are permitted to remarry with the consent of their parents. Divorce is allowed, requiring a donation of up to six and a half rupees paid to the Aravan.

== Funeral rites ==
The Valan either cremate or bury their dead. The final rites are performed on the second, fifth, or seventh day following death. On the thirteenth day, close relatives undergo ritual head tonsure (mundan). On the fifteenth day, ceremonial food offerings (pinda) are made and immersed in water.

Throughout the duration of the funeral rites, a vessel filled with rice and a final fee of ten rupees are given daily to the officiating priest. To prevent the spirit of the deceased from causing trouble, a ritual known as sanhar homa is performed.

== Governance and inheritance ==
The Valan follow a patrilineal system of inheritance. Social matters are governed by a caste council (jat panchayat), which resolves community disputes as well as civil and criminal cases involving caste members. Following Indian independence, the community has experienced educational, economic, and social changes alongside broader societal developments.

== Variations ==
There are no subdivisions in the caste, but the members are said to belong to four exogamous Illam called "Nalillacaran" (Illom is the clan name not the name of brahmin household), namely, Alayakkad, Ennalu, Vaisyagiram and Vazhapally. These correspond to the gotras of the Brahmins, or to four clans, the members of each of which are perhaps descended from a common ancestor. According to a tradition current among them, they were once attached to the four Namboothiri illam above mentioned for service of some kind, and were even the descendants of the members of the illams, but were doomed to the present state of degradation on account of some misconduct. Their homes are called "Agam".

Even now, these Brahmin families are held in great respect by Valans, who when afflicted with family calamities, visit the respective illams with present of a few packets of betel leaves and few annas, to receive the blessing of Brahman masters, which, according to their belief, may tend to avert them.

They were men engaged in boat service or farmers and some practiced medicine and ayurveda, vishachikitsa and in some places were affluent and were landlords.
