= Cochin Portuguese Creole =

Extinct creole language of India

Cochin Indo-Portuguese
- Vypin Indo-Portuguese
- Native to: India
- Region: Kochi
- Extinct: 20 August 2010, with the death of William Rozario
- Language family: Portuguese Creole: Indo-Portuguese Creoles; Cochin Indo-Portuguese

Language codes
- ISO 639-3: –
- Glottolog: mala1544 Malabar–Sri Lanka Portuguese
- ELP: Malabar Indo-Portuguese Creole

Cochin Indo-Portuguese, also known as Vypin Indo-Portuguese from its geographic centre, was an Indo-Portuguese creole once spoken on the Malabar coast of India, particularly in Fort Cochin, in the state of Kerala. The last person who spoke it as a first language, William Rozario, died in 2010. It was spoken by Christian families in an around Vypeen Island (Vypin Island) and other areas of the Kochi metropolitan area.

== History ==
Cochin Indo-Portuguese, known locally as "Portuguese" or "Cochin Portuguese", formed from contact between Portuguese, Malayalam and other languages spoken in old Cochin. Cochin Portuguese was one of the first contact languages to spring up from European contact in Asia, and it became the mother tongue of part of the local Catholic community in the 15th to 19th centuries. It emerged from Catholic Indo-Portuguese households in Malabar, and it became sufficiently established that it continued under Dutch occupation in the 17th century. Speakers started shifting away from the language around the turn of the 19th century. The last native speaker, William Rozario, died on 20 August 2010 in Vypeen. Some in Cochin still understand it to a degree.

== Examples ==
Numbers in Cochin Portuguese
Creole	Standard Portuguese	English
umma	um	one
dōs	dois	two
thrēs	três	three
kāthru	quatro	four
sinkku	cinco	five
sēys	seis	six
sēthi	sete	seven
oythu	oito	eight
nōvi	nove	nine
dēs	dez	ten

=== Portuguese and Malayalam Influence ===
Both Portuguese and Malayalam have had significant influences in Malabar Indo-Portuguese. The verb tæ, for example, borrows its semantic context from other Portuguese verbs, namely from the verbs ter (have) and estar (be). Conversely, the verb's morphosyntactic and semantic constructions were influenced greatly by Malayalam.
