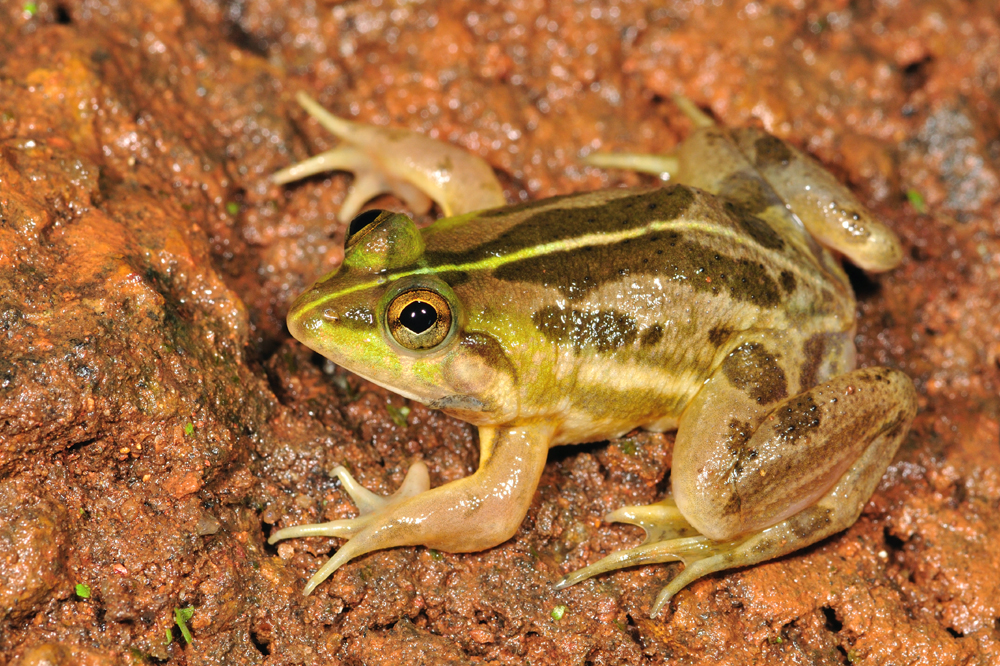
- Adult male from Manipal, Karnataka

Scientific classification
- Kingdom: Animalia
- Phylum: Chordata
- Class: Amphibia
- Order: Anura
- Family: Dicroglossidae
- Genus: Euphlyctis
- Species: E. aloysii

Binomial name
- Euphlyctis aloysii Joshy, Alam, Kurabayashi, Sumida, and Kuramoto, 2009

= Euphlyctis aloysii =

Species of frog

Euphlyctis aloysii is a species of frog in the family Dicroglossidae. It is endemic to Karnataka, southwestern India. It was described from a female holotype from Mangalore, Karnataka.

== Description ==
Adults are small compared to other members of this genus; head is wider than long; snout appears pointed; nostrils are closer to the tip of snout rather than the eye; the nostrils are farther apart as compared to the distance between the eyes; tympanum is distinct and large, forming nearly 75% of the eye diameter; no webbing between fingers; first finger longer than the second but smaller than the third; foot longer than the femur and shank length; toes moderately pointed; fourth toe longer than others; webbing between toes are full, reaching the tips of all toes and sharply incised between toes; inner-metatarsal tubercle is indistinct; supratympanic fold present, but does not reach the base of arms; dorsum interspersed with small, rounded ridges; flanks, thigh and venter are smooth; a pair of dermal projections seen from anterior edge of forelimbs until groin. Phylogenetic analysis indicates that E. aloysii is closely related to E. hexadactylus and another potentially un-described species.

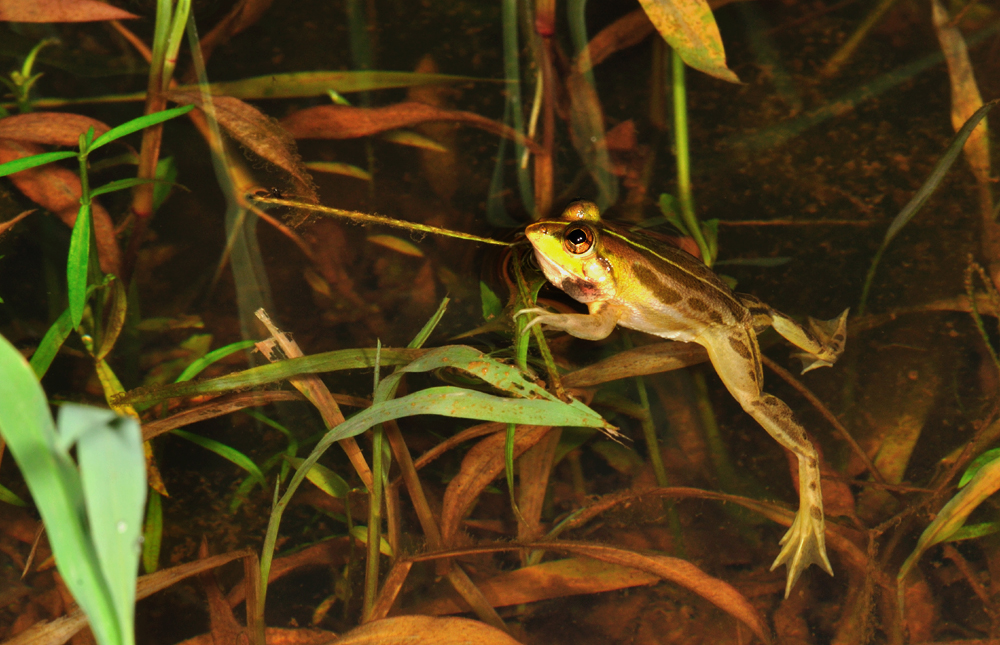
Adult male of Euphlyctis aloysii floating on the surface of water. The purple vocal sac in male and complete webbing in feet are visible.

=== Color in life ===
Dorsum appears greenish brown with a thin, greenish mid-dorsal line running from tip of snout to vent; upper jaw near snout appear greenish as do the flanks, with the green coloration reducing gradually towards the groin. Based on the coloration, the adults of this species may be confused with juveniles of E. hexadactylus.

== Etymology ==
This species is named in honor of Aloysius Gonzaga, a prince in Italy who entered the Jesuit order and died in Rome, serving people during an epidemic plague. The institution where one of the authors completed most work in describing the species is named after St. Aloysius as well.

== Ecology and natural history ==
The ova in female specimens are pigmented and about 1 mm in diameter. Gravid females have been collected from the months of May until late July and implied that they may spawn in early August. E. aloysii co-occurs with other congeners such as E. hexadactylus; E. cyanophlyctis and E. karaavali. Other species include Hoplobatrachus tigerinus, Microhyla ornata, Minervarya sahyadris, Minervarya caperata and, Indosylvirana intermedia.

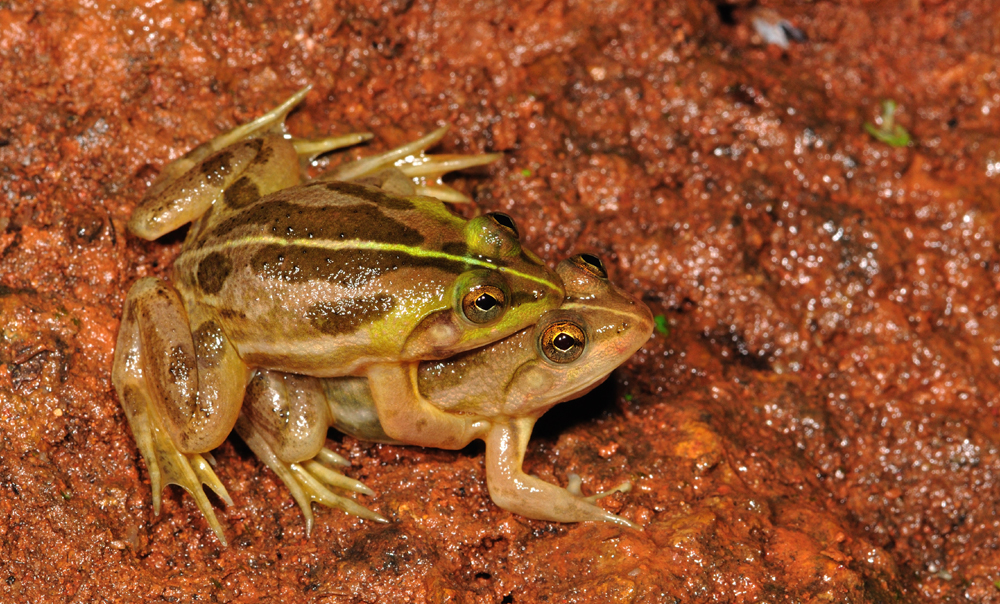
Adult male and female of E. aloysii in axillary amplexus from Manipal, Karnataka

== Distribution ==
Currently known from Adyar and Bajpe in Mangalore and Manipal in Karnataka.
