= Five-fingered frog =

Five-fingered frog may refer to:

- Arabian five-fingered frog (Euphlyctis ehrenbergii), a frog in the family Dicroglossidae found in Saudi Arabia and Yemen
- Indian five-fingered frog (Euphlyctis hexadactylus), a frog in the family Dicroglossidae found in Pakistan, India, Bangladesh, and Sri Lanka
