= Humayun Abdulali =

Indian ornithologist and biologist

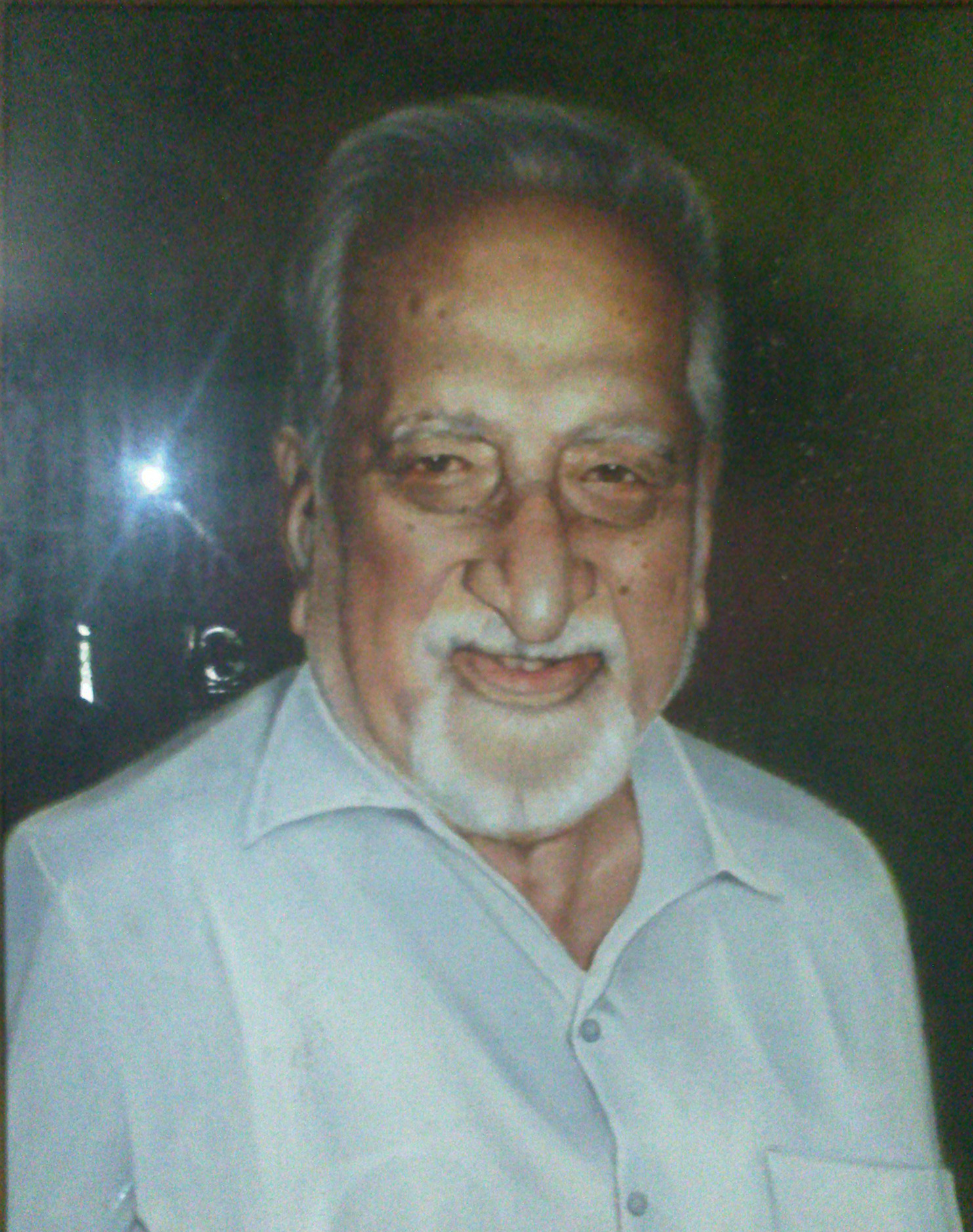
- Portrait of Humayun Abdulali painted by J.P Irani
- Born: 19 May 1914; Kobe, Japan
- Died: 3 June 2001 (aged 87); Mumbai, India
- Resting place: Mumbai, India
- Citizenship: Indian
- Education: St. Xavier's College, Mumbai
- Spouse: Rafia Tyabji
- Children: Akbar Abdulali (born 1955), Salman Abdulali (born 1958)
- Relatives: Tyabji family (paternal and spousal)
- Awards: Maharashtra Foundation Samajkarya Gaurav Puraskar (en: Maharashtra Foundation Award for Honouring Social Work); Award for Outstanding Contribution to Asian Ornithology
- Scientific career
- Fields: ornithology, natural history, wildlife conservation, taxonomy
- Workplaces: Bombay Natural History Society

Humayun Abdulali (19 May 1914, Kobe, Japan - 3 June 2001, Mumbai, India) was an Indian ornithologist and biologist who was also a cousin of the "birdman of India", Salim Ali. Like other naturalists of his period, he took an initial interest in shikar (hunting). Unlike Sálim Ali, his main contributions were less field-oriented and based more on bird collections, particularly those at the Bombay Natural History Society where he worked for most of his life.

== Early years and education ==
Humayun Abdulali was born to a Sulaymani Bohra Ismaili family in Kobe in 1914. His parents were Lulu and Najmuddin Faizalhussain Abdulali, a businessman who imported raw cotton and safety matches from India. In his unfinished autobiography (posthumously published in the book Humayan Abdulali - Naturalist Portrait and Tribute), he wrote that his interest in natural history may have been cultivated at an early age at the English Mission School in Kobe, while reading American stories on cowboys and the wild west. The Abdulali family relocated to Mumbai (then Bombay), India in 1924.

Humayun went to primary school at St Xavier's High School and later graduated from St. Xavier's College, Mumbai in 1936 with a Bachelor of Arts (Honours) degree while also receiving the Narayan Vasudev Prize. It was while studying zoology at St Xavier's College in 1932 that he started collecting birds.

After graduating he worked for a year in his father's business (Faiz and Co.) of exporting scrap iron to Japan. He bought a secondhand 10/12 HP (horsepower) Harley Davidson motorcycle to travel extensively in and around Bombay. He also bought an old Lancia Tourer, which he used for several months. In 1938, he and his friend Boman Patuck met with a motorcycle accident that left them seriously injured. A policeman who had hitched a ride with them died in the accident. Humayun was charged with rash and negligent driving and was subsequently acquitted by a court in Bombay. He replaced the motorbike with a Morris Minor in 1939, which he used until his death.

He went on numerous excursions to observe fauna as well as for hunts, accompanied by his naturalist friends and his cousin Salim Ali. These travels took him to Talegaon, Nashik, North Kanara, Travancore, Bharatpur, Assam (Manas and Kaziranga), Aurangabad, Western Ghats and the Kanheri Caves. In his unfinished autobiography, he describes his adventures and exploits in and around Bombay - shooting ducks, partridges, and tigers, as well as spotting various birds, animals, reptiles, and amphibians.

== Career ==
Sálim Ali introduced Humayun to the Bombay Natural History Society (BNHS). He became a member of the Society in 1931, the year in which his first note titled "Eleven Koel eggs in a Crow's nest" was published in the Journal of the Bombay Natural History Society (JBNHS). His second note, published in the journal in 1934, earned him further acclaim. He published 356 notes in his lifetime and these covered birds, snakes, frogs and other fauna. He authored 270 scientific papers and 50 book reviews. A six-part series based on the specimens he collected when at St Xavier's college and of the birds he had spotted in and around Bombay, co-authored by Salim Ali, and titled "The Birds of Bombay and Salsette", was published between 1936 and 1938 in the Journal of the Bombay Natural History Society. Subsequently, the two continued to document their observations of the birds spotted in these areas in the journal.

Charles McCann, the assistant curator at the BNHS, helped Humayun in identifying the specimens he had collected during his excursions. The two became good friends. After McCann's death, Humayun donated money towards the Charles McCann Vertebrate Fieldwork Fund instituted by the BNHS to promote field research.

Humayun was elected to the Executive Committee of the BNHS in 1942. He was elected Joint Honorary Secretary of the BNHS along with Sálim Ali in 1949. During his tenure as the Honorary Secretary at BNHS (1949–62), three important milestones were achieved:

- He was instrumental in drafting the Bombay Wild Animals and Wild Birds Protection Act of 1951. The law aimed to curb the rampant poaching and subsequent destruction of wildlife that started after India gained independence in 1947.
- He obtained permission from the Prince of Wales Museum to house the BNHS in its premises. He negotiated a grant of 3.5 lakh (350,000) rupees from the Central Government for the BNHS building.
- He catalogued the specimens in the collection of the BNHS.

He was the editor of the Journal of the Bombay Natural History Society from 1960 to 1962, along with Sálim Ali and H. Santapau. After his stint as the honorary secretary of the BNHS ended in 1962, he continued to serve on the executive committee. From 1987 to 1992, he served as the vice president of the committee. In 1993, the BNHS conferred upon him the title of emeritus naturalist in recognition of his work at the BNHS.

=== Specimen collections ===
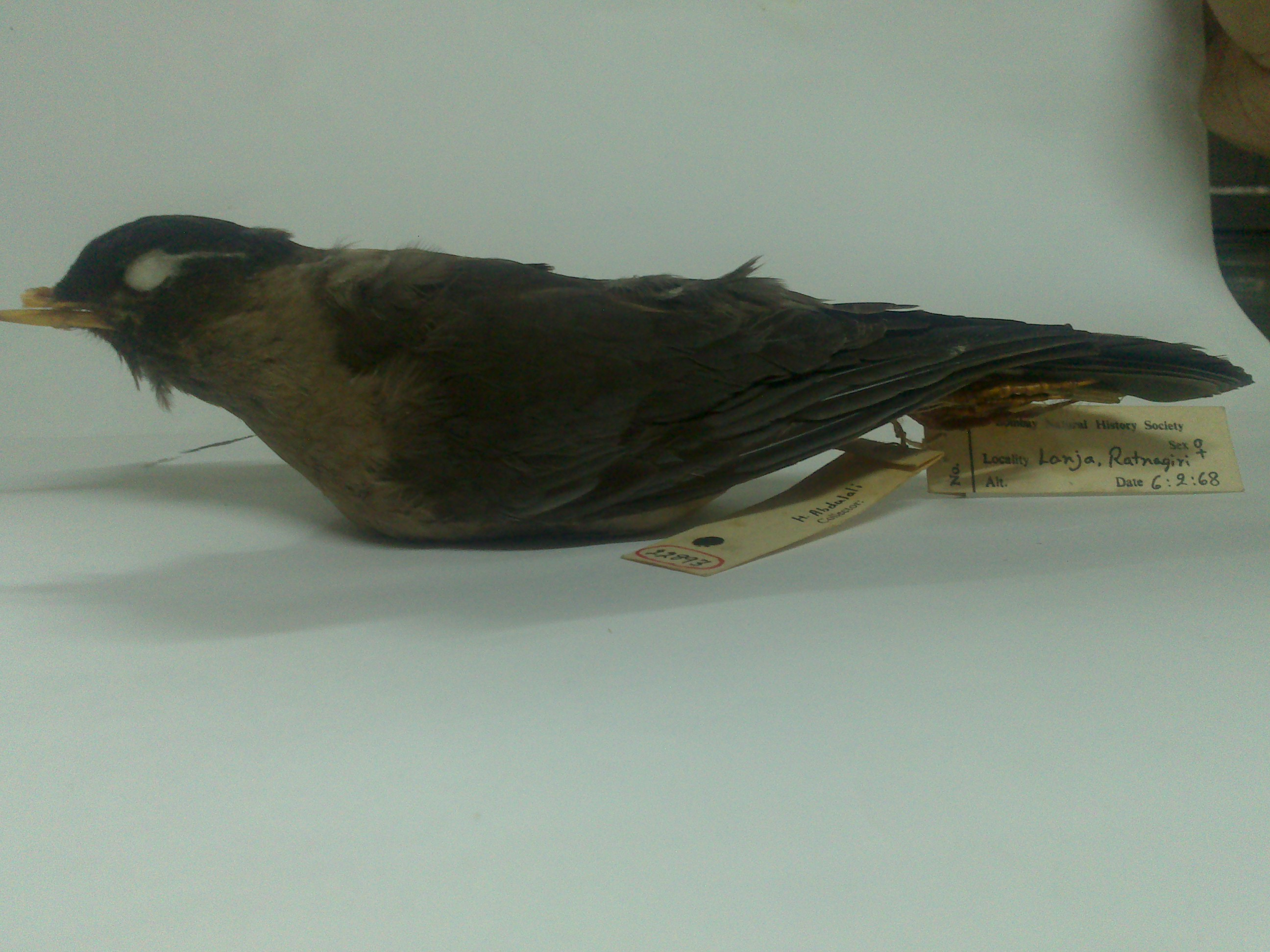
Eurasian blackbird Turdus merula collected by Abdulali, at Lanja, Ratnagiri in 1968

Humayun Abdulali collected specimens from in and around Bombay as well as from as far as the Andaman and Nicobar islands and added to the BNHS collection, which is now estimated to have around 50,000 specimens of reptiles, mammals, amphibians, and insects, and approximately 29,000 specimens of birds. He contributed about 3,000 bird specimens to the collection, now at the Bird Room of the BNHS. He played a crucial role in obtaining a grant for the housing and maintenance of the collection from the government of Maharashtra.

After Humayun's tenure as the Honorary Secretary ended in 1962, he focused on re-examining and re-structuring the collection at BNHS. His studies resulted in the identification of 18 new sub-species. The catalogue, titled "Catalogue of the Birds in the Collection of the Bombay Natural History Society", was published in the Journal of the BNHS between 1968 and 1996. After his death, the Bird Room at the BNHS was named after him.

Humayun contributed greatly to the production of the Handbook of Salim Ali and Dillon Ripley.

=== Work in the Andaman and Nicobar Islands ===
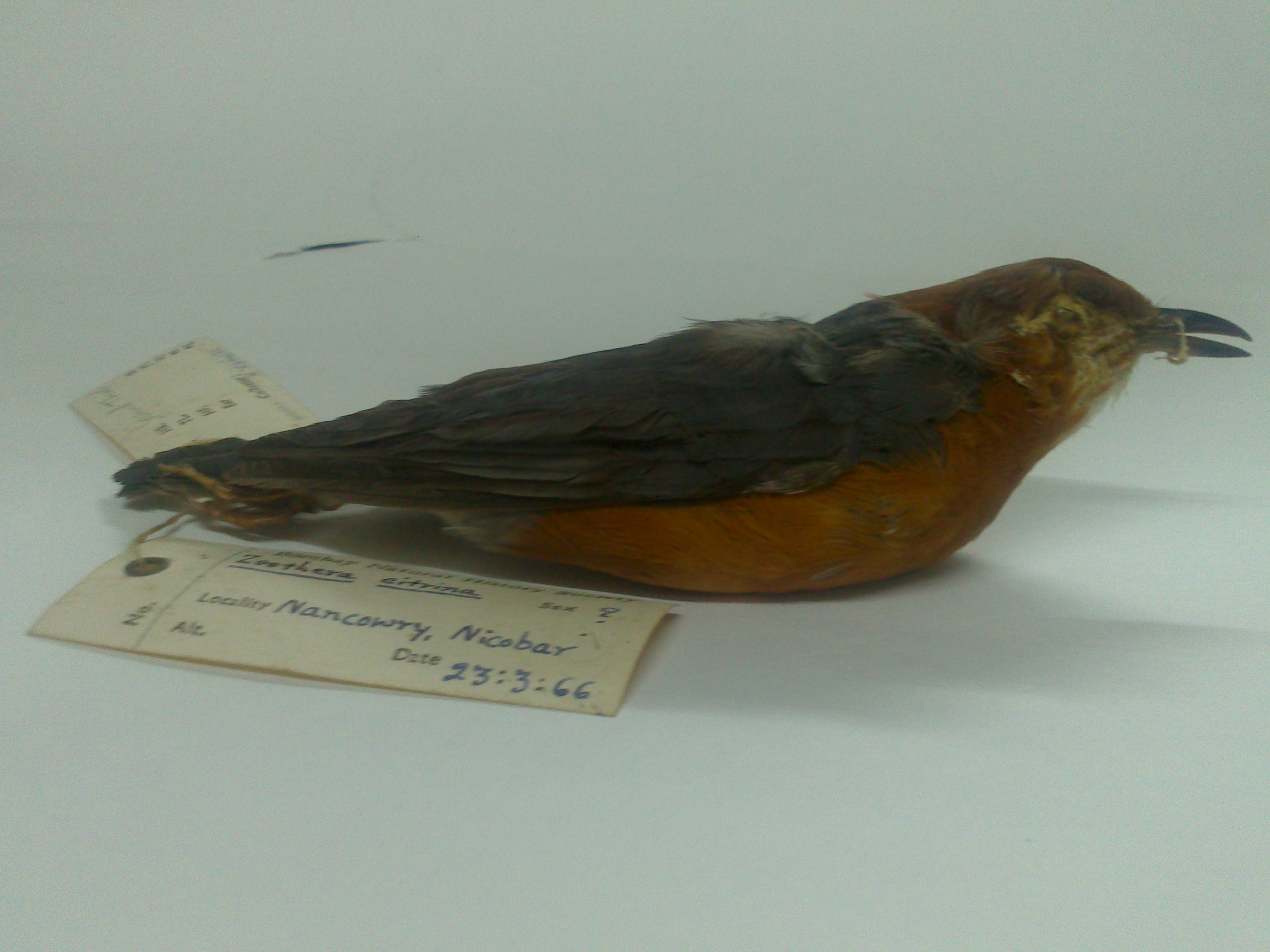
Orange-headed thrush Zoothera citrina collected by Abdulali at Nancowry, Nicobars in 1966

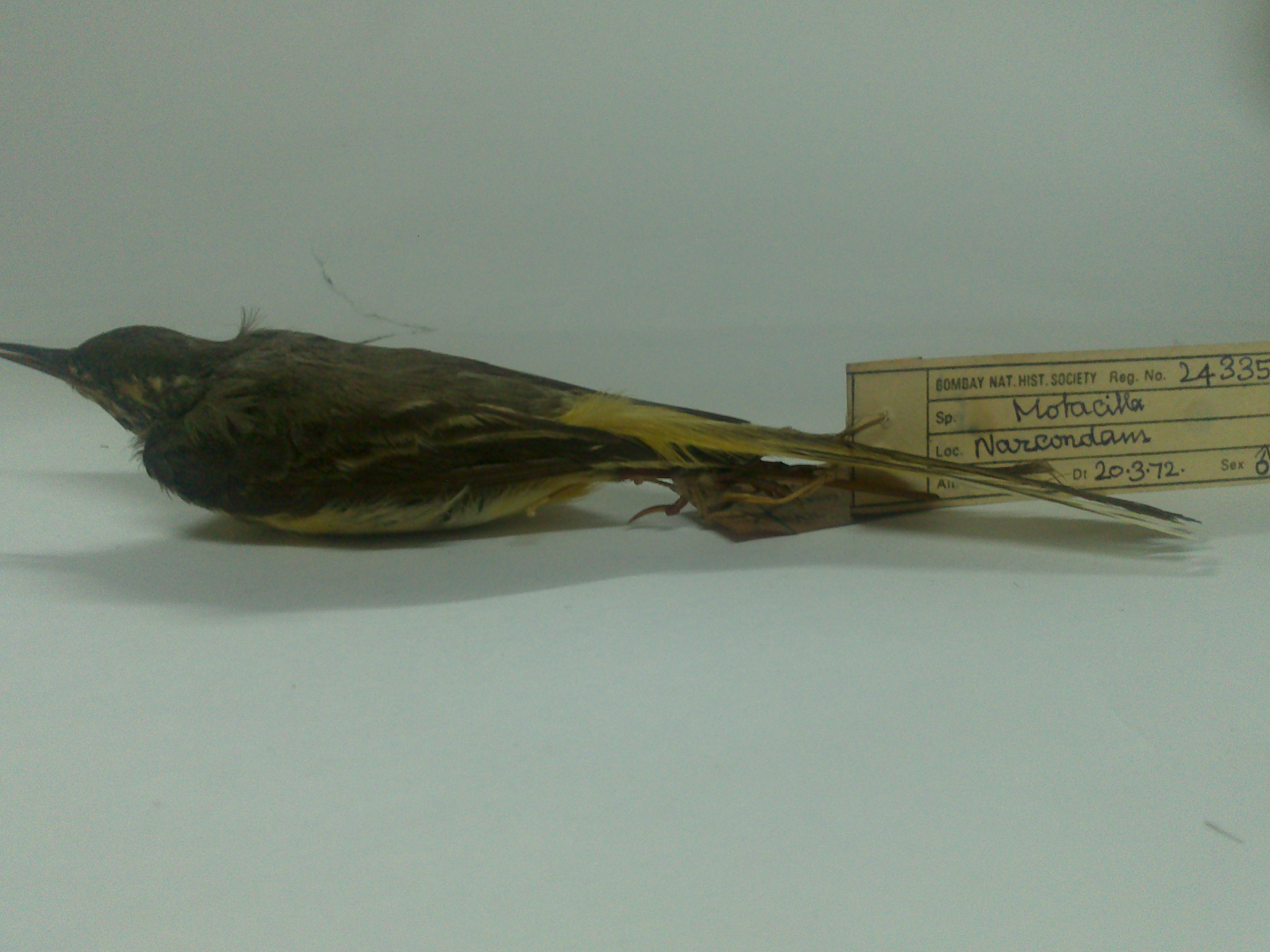
A grey wagtail collected by Abdulali at Narcondam in India in 1972

From 1963 to 1977, he made eight trips to the Andaman and Nicobar Islands, accompanied by various people on different trips—colleagues from BNHS, researchers, assistants from the Zoological Survey of India, his son Akbar, etc. The aim of the expeditions to the archipelago of around 225 islands was to gather specimens of unknown subspecies, or of subspecies that were till then taxonomically documented as merely "Andamans" or "Nicobars" or "Andamans and Nicobars". Several specimens were obtained during these trips and added to the collection of BNHS: The Otus alius (Nicobar scops owl), the Nicobar pigeon, the Narcondam hornbill, other birds, fruit bats, flying foxes, frogs, toads, lizards, snakes, etc. His observations were published in the Journal of the BNHS, which brought to light the nature of fauna in the islands.

Humayun drew attention to the need to conserve the forests and biodiversity at the Andaman and Nicobar islands, particularly Barren Island, Narcondam Island and the Battye Malve Island. The Indian Navy ceased shooting practice at the Battye Malve, a nesting place of the Nicobar Pigeon, after Humayun made a representation to the navy during one of the trips. He also highlighted the flaws and pitfalls in the Wildlife (Protection) Act, 1972. These lacunae led to difficulties in obtaining permissions for gathering specimens at the islands for research. On the other hand, illegal killing and poaching of the animals protected by the Act continued to happen at the Andaman and Nicobar archipelago and elsewhere in the country.

=== Taxa described by Humayun Abdulali ===
Seventeen bird subspecies were described by Abdulali, but some of these may no longer be considered valid. These include:

- The Andaman sub-species of the black baza, Andaman crested baza, Aviceda leuphotes andamanica
- Jungle bush-quail, Perdicula asiatica vellorei
- Great Nicobar whitebreasted waterhen, Amaurornis phoenicurus midnicobaricus
- Andaman cuckoo-dove, Macropygia rufipennis andamanica
- Great Nicobar form of the Andaman cuckoo-dove, Macropygia rufipennis tiwarii
- Andaman green imperial pigeon, Ducula aenea andamanica
- Great Nicobar hawkowl, Ninox affinis rexpimenti (Named for Rex Pimento, the In-charge of the bird collection at the BNHS)
- Fairy bluebird, Irena puella andamanica
- Eastern Ghats form of the puff-throated babbler, Pellorneum ruficeps pallidum
- Eastern Finn's baya, Ploceus megarhynchus salimalii
- Great Nicobar form of the Asian glossy starling, Aplonis panayensis albiris
- Andaman form of the black-hooded oriole, Oriolus xanthornus reubeni
- Nicobar slaty-breasted rail, Rallus striatus nicobarensis
- Car Nicobar white-breasted waterhen, Amaurornis phoenicurus leucocephalus
- Alpine swift, Apus melba dorabtatai. Now Tachymarpis melba dorabtatai.
- Oriental skylark, Alauda gulgula dharmakumarsinhjii
- White-throated tawny-bellied babbler, Dumetia hyperythra navarroi

=== Wildlife protection and conservation ===
==== Bombay Wild Birds and Wild Animals Act, 1951 ====
Before India achieved independence in 1947, about 750 princely states in the country protected and preserved the local wildlife. With independence, poaching became rampant and new legislation to protect wildlife became a pressing necessity. A bill for the required law was drafted by Humayun Abdulali, who was then the Honorary Secretary of the BNHS, and J.A. Singh, a retired Chief Conservator of Forests. The Government of Bombay passed the Bombay Wild Birds and Wild Animals Act, which included areas designated as forests and those outside them, in 1951. It came into force in Bombay on 1 May 1953. A Special Wildlife Protection Officer and several Honorary Game Wardens, equipped with police powers, were appointed under the new law to patrol forest areas. After a tamarind tree that housed egrets was chopped down within the premises of the BSES in Mumbai, Humayun, as the Honorary Warden, collected a fine from the Managing Director of BSES.

For a few years after the implementation of the act, Humayun was an Honorary Game Warden with his authority spanning over the state of Maharashtra. Then his jurisdiction was reduced to Greater Bombay and Thane until his warden status was cancelled. As the game warden, he nabbed poachers, helped police officers file First Information Reports, and helped curb the sale of jackal and fox tails as decorative items.

The Act was later modified to draft the Wildlife Protection Act, 1972.

==== Borivali National Park ====
During his tenure as the Honorary Secretary of the BNHS, Humayun proposed that the forest areas located north of Aarey Forest in Bombay up to the Vasai Creek be designated as a national park. These areas would include the wilderness around Tulsi lake and Vihar lake, and the Kanheri Caves. The 100-square-kilometre area was notified as the Borivali National Park by the government of India in the 1960s, and was renamed as the Sanjay Gandhi National Park in 1981. In 1975, the Government of Maharashtra started work on the construction of a highway that ran through the park, despite protests from environmental organisations and groups. Along with a few other members of BNHS, Humayun filed a Public Interest Litigation (PIL) petition in the Bombay High Court for halting the construction of the highway. The court ordered a stay on the construction of the road and work on the road was never restarted subsequently.

==== Ban on the export of frogs' legs ====
His work on frogs in agricultural ecosystems helped in the imposition of a ban by the Indian government on the export of frogs' legs.

In the early 1960s, Humayun learnt about the commercial export of the legs of the bullfrog (Rana tigrina) from India to be used as a delicacy. He was of the opinion that the frog, which ate insects and acted as a pest control, should not be eaten in the interest of preserving ecological balance and avoiding the use of chemical pesticides such as DDT. Humayun wrote to the editor of the Science Reporter, published by the Government of India, and to government bodies, trying to draw attention to the dwindling number of bullfrogs owing to export. In 1969, he referred the matter to the erstwhile Chief Minister of Maharashtra, Vasantrao Naik, who asked him to formally present the matter so that it could be examined. However, these efforts drew a blank.

A few years later he discussed the export of frogs' legs, and its probable impact on agriculture in Konkan and elsewhere, with Dr D.N. Srivastava, the then Assistant Director General of the Indian Council of Agricultural Research (ICAR). Srivastava asked him to undertake a research study and offered to pay for his scientific assistants. Humayun undertook a three-year research project titled 'Determination of Ecological Disturbances in Agricultural and Adjoining Lands Caused by the Removal of Rana tigrina and Rana hexadactyla for Export' as the Principal Investigator. The research project was undertaken through the BNHS in the rice fields of Thane and Colaba and a frog-processing factory at Karjat.

An examination of the contents obtained from the stomachs of frogs revealed that ninety percent of their food consisted of crabs, insects, and the larvae of insects, all of which harmed the rice crop. Based on the study, a paper 'On the Export of Frogs' Legs from India' was published in the Journal of the BNHS. In 1979, a Parliamentary Committee examined a report based on the study and asked Dr Sálim Ali, then a Member of the Rajya Sabha, if a ban on the export of frogs' legs was feasible. Dr Sálim Ali supported the ban, which was ultimately recommended by the committee. All frogs of the genus Rana are now protected under Schedule IV of the Wildlife Protection Act 1972.

Humayun was also concerned about the cruelty practiced in the killing of these frogs.

The ban had its detractors, who believed that frogs and toads did not impact the population of insects and pests significantly. Even after the ban was imposed, Humayun was vigilant about the ban being lifted temporarily or permanently.

==== Conservation of grey junglefowl ====
Another species Humayun helped conserve in Bombay was the grey junglefowl. Its feathers were being sent mostly to the United States by post in the late 1940s. On being informed about a consignment of grey junglefowl feathers being dispatched from Calcutta, he contacted the Audubon Society in the US. The receivers of the parcel were prosecuted on three counts and fined $10,000 on each. This considerably reduced the dispatch of the feathers from India.

=== Differences with Sálim Ali ===
The scientific opinions of Sálim Ali and Humayun Abdulali would frequently differ and they would also often disagree with each other matters such as the style of functioning of the Society. The former was interested in ecology and field ornithology, the latter on taxonomy and the collection. The two came to loggerheads over the topic of the allotment of funds to the Society's bird-ringing project. Sálim Ali, with the support of the Executive Committee, wanted the Reference Collection staff to work on the bird-ringing project. They also disagreed on what groups they should focus on; Ali favoured ringing passerines while Abdulali suggested that he work on waders. Humayun was of the view that the grant given by the state government for the collection should not be diverted to other projects. The disagreement led to Humayun not being nominated to the executive committee in the 1971 elections of the Societysss .

== Taxa named for Humayun Abdulali ==
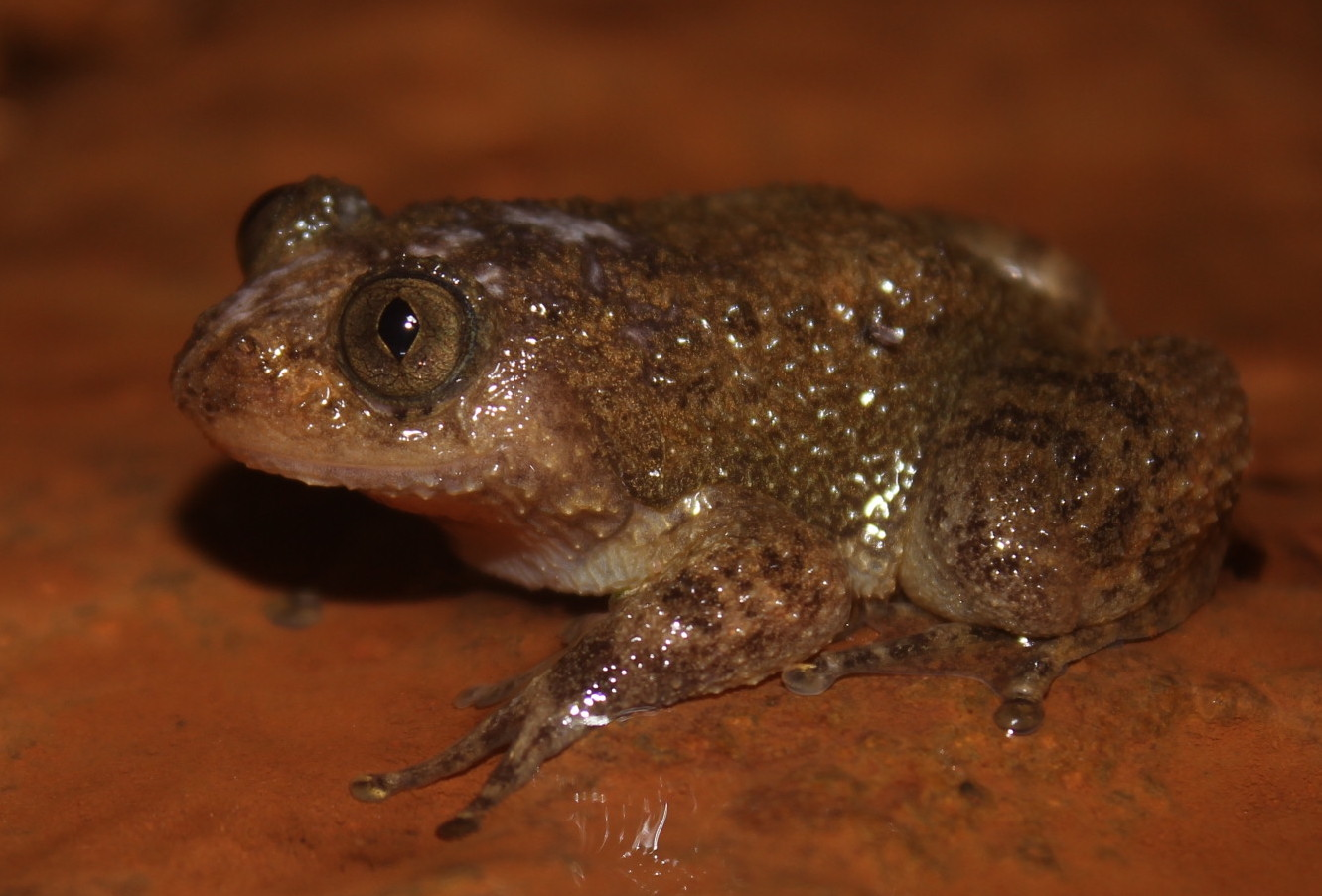
Bombay night frog (Nyctibatrachus humayuni)

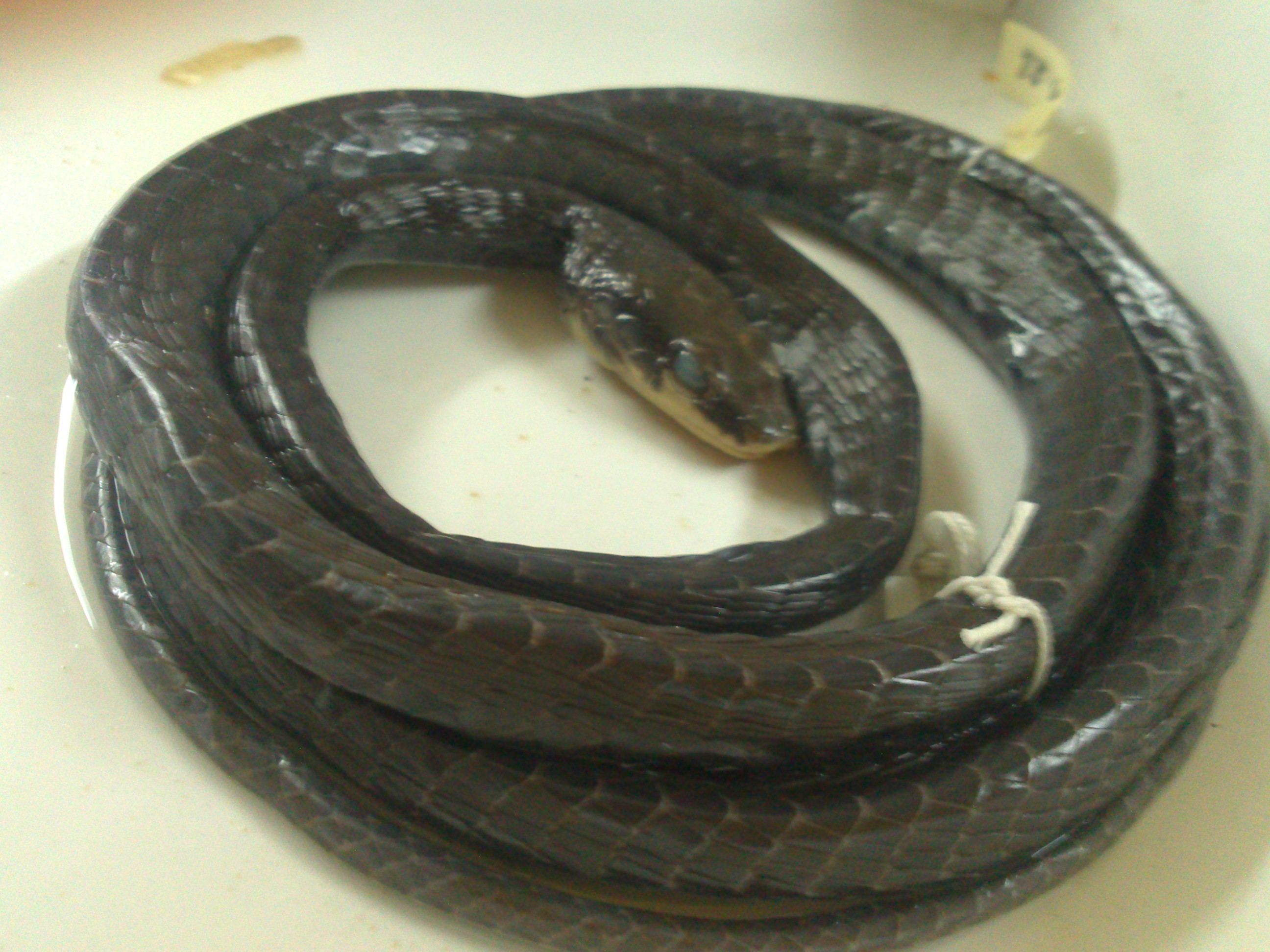
Nicobar bronzeback (Dendrelaphis humayuni)

- Nyctibatrachus humayuni, Bombay night frog
- Otus alius, Nicobar scops owl
- Pycnonotus cafer humayuni, a desert form of the red-vented bulbul, the first bird named after him.
- Accipiter virgatus abdulali, Nicobar besra sparrowhawk
- Dendrelaphis humayuni, Nicobarese bronzeback tree snake

== Works ==
- Catalogue of the Birds in the Collection of the Bombay Natural History Society, The Journal of the Bombay Natural History Society, published in 37 parts between 1968 and 1996.
- The birds of the Andaman and Nicobar Islands.
- Some peculiarities of avifaunal distribution in Peninsular India
- On the export of Frogs Legs from India, The Journal of the Bombay Natural History Society (1985)

== Awards ==
- Award for Outstanding Contribution to Asian Ornithology, First Pan-Asian Ornithological Congress, Coimbatore, 1996.
- Maharashtra Foundation Samajkarya Gaurav Puraskar, 1998. (in English: Maharashtra Foundation Award for Honouring Social Work)

== Cited sources ==
- Reuben, Rachel (2003). Humayun Abdulali-Naturalist. New Delhi: Mosaic Books. ISBN 81-901297-6-7.
