= E. ehrenbergii =

E. ehrenbergii may refer to:

- Echinocereus ehrenbergii, a ribbed cactus
- Euphlyctis ehrenbergii, a frog endemic to the Red Sea coast
