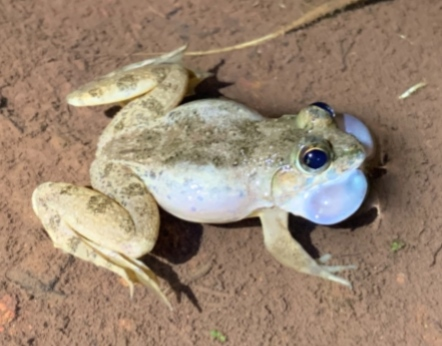

Scientific classification
- Kingdom: Animalia
- Phylum: Chordata
- Class: Amphibia
- Order: Anura
- Family: Dicroglossidae
- Genus: Euphlyctis
- Species: E. jaladhara

Binomial name
- Euphlyctis jaladhara Dinesh, Channakeshavamurthy, Deepak, Shabnam, Gosh & Deuti, 2022
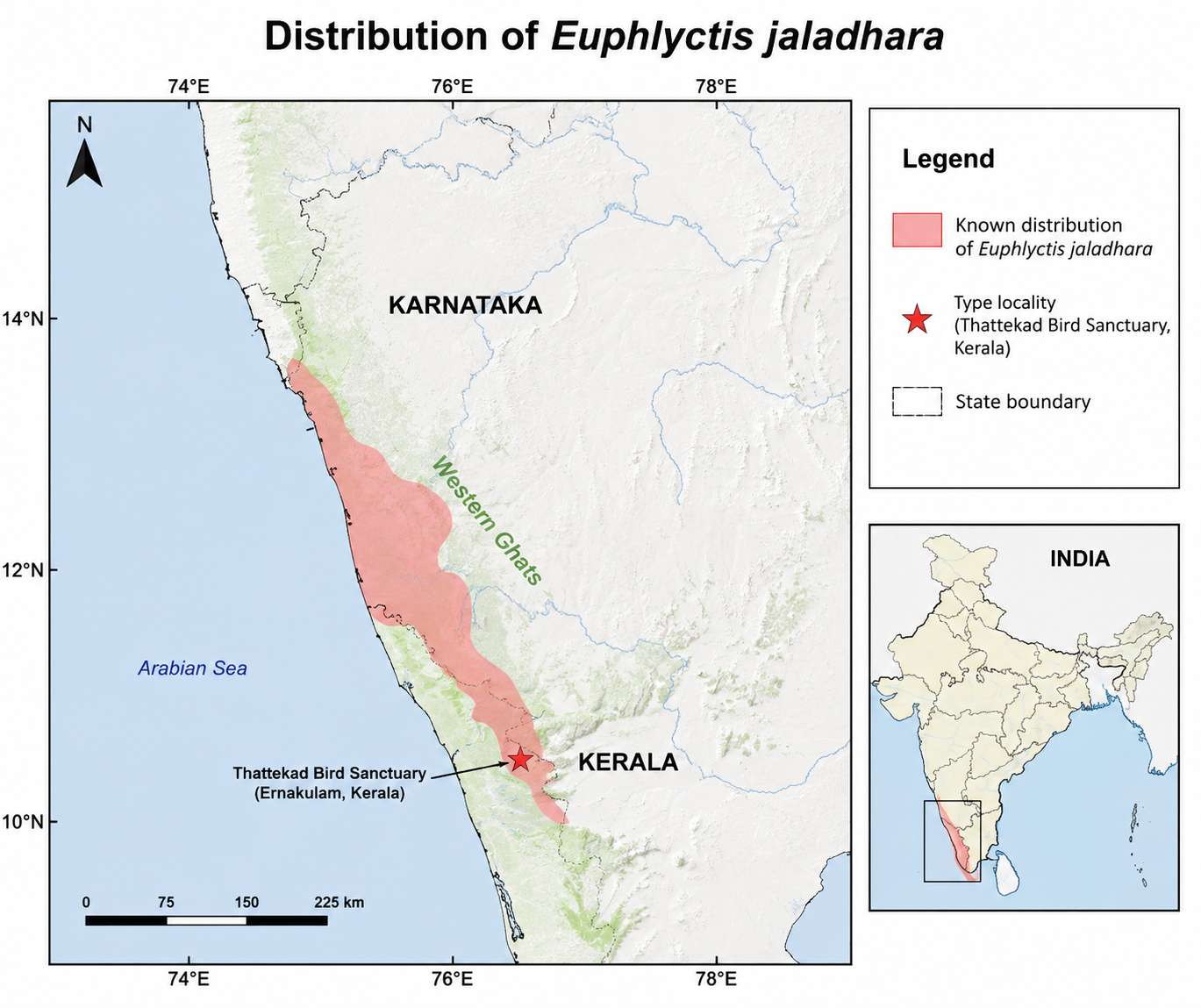
- Known distribution of Euphlytics jaladhara

= Euphlyctis jaladhara =

Species of frog

Euphlyctis jaladhara is a species of frog in the family Dicroglossidae. It was described as a new species in 2022 from the western coastal plains of peninsular India. The species is known from parts of Kerala and Karnataka, and its type specimens were collected from the Thattekad Bird Sanctuary in Kerala. It is distinguished from other closely related species by a combination of morphological and molecular characteristics.

== Discovery ==
It was discovered as part of a detailed study of skittering frogs belonging to the genus Euphlyctis in the western coastal plains of peninsular India. Researchers examined frog populations from different locations in Kerala and Karnataka, paying particular attention to their external morphology, coloration, body measurements and other diagnostic features. During the study, some specimens were found to differ consistently from previously known species of Euphlyctis. To confirm whether these differences represented a distinct species, the researchers also analysed molecular data and compared the specimens with closely related species.

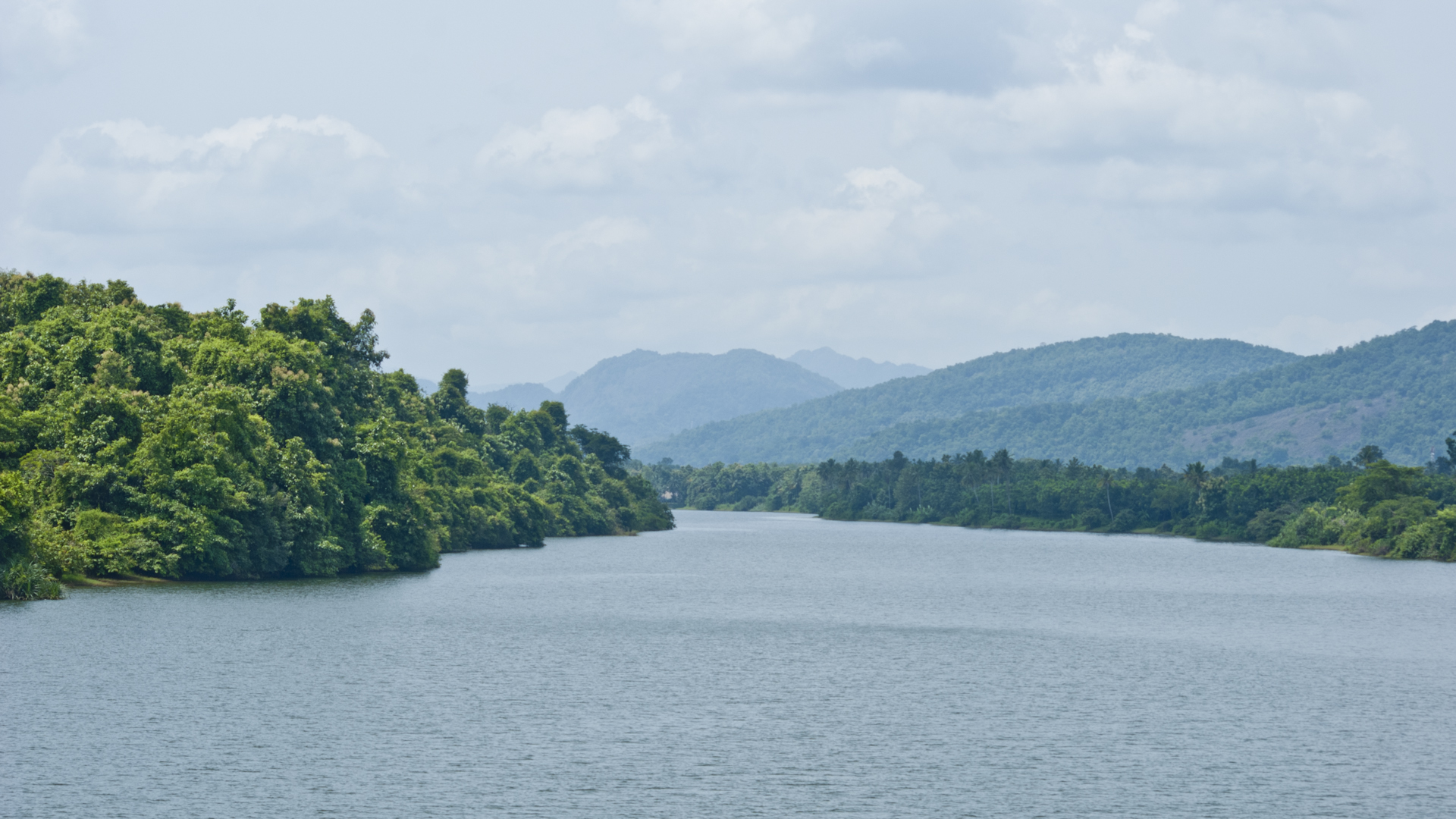
Thattekkad bird sanctuary, where Euphlyctis jaladhara was first discovered

The combined morphological and molecular evidence supported the recognition of the frogs as a previously undescribed species. The new species was formally described in 2022 by K. P. Dinesh and colleagues in the scientific journal Zootaxa. The type specimens were collected from the Thattekad Bird Sanctuary in Kerala, which serves as the type locality of the species. The discovery of Euphlyctis jaladhara contributed to the growing knowledge of amphibian diversity in the Western Ghats and the western coastal regions of India.

== Taxonomy ==
Euphlyctis jaladhara belongs to the family Dicroglossidae, a group of frogs commonly found across parts of Asia. It is classified within the genus Euphlyctis, commonly known as skittering frogs. The species was formally described in 2022 by K. P. Dinesh and colleagues after morphological and molecular studies showed that it was distinct from other members of the genus. The specific name jaladhara is derived from the Sanskrit word jaladhārā, referring to a stream or flow of water.

== Description ==
Euphlyctis jaladhara is a small skittering frog with a body shape typical of members of the genus Euphlyctis. with a broad head and well-developed hind limbs adapted for swimming and jumping. The dorsal surface is generally olive green in colour and may show darker markings, while the underside is lighter. Its eyes are prominent, and the hind feet are well adapted to an aquatic lifestyle.

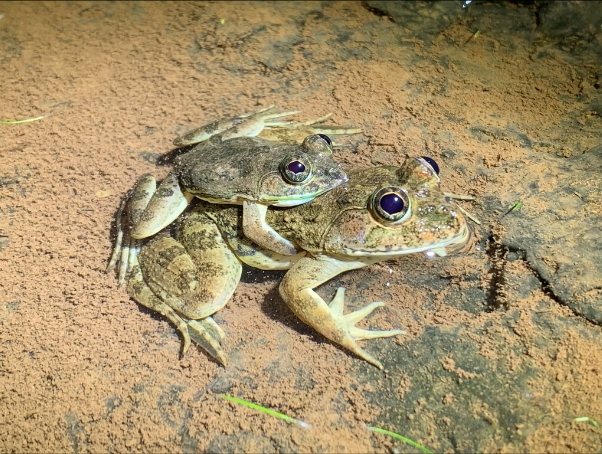
Euphlyctis jaladhara in its natural habitat

The males are smaller (33.7 mm-37.8 mm SVL) and females are larger (40.8 mm-62.1 mm SVL). The species can be distinguished from closely related Euphlyctis frogs by a combination of morphological characteristics and genetic differences. Researchers used features such as body proportions, head shape, skin texture, coloration and other anatomical characters together with molecular analysis to confirm its distinct identity. Like other skittering frogs, E. jaladhara is associated with freshwater habitats and is commonly found around water bodies and streams.
