= Nerse =

Nerse Nersa
- village
- Location in Karnataka, India Nerse (India)
- Coordinates: 15.5999°N 74.4285°E
- Country: India
- State: Karnataka

Languages
  - Official: Kannada
- Time zone: UTC+5:30 (IST)

Nerse, also known as Nersa, is a village located in Khanapur Taluk of Belagavi District, Karnataka, India. It is also the headquarters for Nerse Gram Panchayat. The distance from Belagavi is about 40 km and from Bengaluru is 500 km. It is situated under the Western Ghats, on the boundary of Karnataka and Goa.

It is a part of the proposed Bhimgarh Sanctuary and is a heavily forested area. Apart from resident birds, it is also home to many migratory species such as the Ceylon frogmouth and the paradise flycatcher. The forest of Nerse is also home to bats in the Talvedi region and the Krishnapur area of Mahadai Valley. There are more than 40 species of bats in Nerse. Close to Nerse is the Dandeli Wildlife Sanctuary which has a herd of elephants.

Summer temperatures range from 23 °C to 35 °C, while winter temperatures range from 13 °C to 20 °C.
