= 2007 Thattekkad boat disaster =

Capsizing of a passenger boat in Thattekkad, India

Thattekkad boat tragedy
- Date: 20 February 2007
- Time: 6:30 pm (IST, UTC+05:30)
- Location: Thattekkad, Kerala, India
- Type: Boat capsizing
- Participants: 37
- Deaths: 18

The Thattekkad boat disaster occurred on 20 February 2007, when a tourist boat sank in Thattekkad near Bhoothathankettu on Ernakulam-Idukki district border. 15 students, 2 teachers and 1 employee of a private school in Angamaly, who went on an excursion died in the accident.

== Details ==
The excursion group boarded on three boats from Bhoothathankettu area, twenty kilometers away from Kothamangalam. The boat that sank was returning from a visit to the nearby Thattekad bird sanctuary. The accident happened on 20 February 2007 at 6:30 pm local time at Ovunkal jetty in Periyar, one kilometer away from Thattekad bird sanctuary. 37 people were traveling in the boat. According to preliminary conclusions, the bottom of the boat in which the excursion group was traveling was shaken and the water entered the cause of the accident. But the then DGP Raman Srivastava, who held a press conference the day after the incident, said that the accident happened because the boat overturned. After the accident, it was clear that the boat involved in the accident was not licensed.

== Aftermath ==
Following the incident, justice M. M. Pareed Pillay filed a report in which he proposed comprehensive legislation addressing inland transportation and made around 86 recommendations, including making swimming an extracurricular subject. The owner and driver of the boat P. M. Raju was charged with involuntary manslaughter and immature and careless boating. He was sentenced to five years in jail and 1 lakh rupees were fined. Later in 2021, the imprisonment was reduced to two years.

== See also ==
- 2002 Kumarakom boat disaster
- 2009 Thekkady boat disaster
- 2023 Tanur boat disaster
