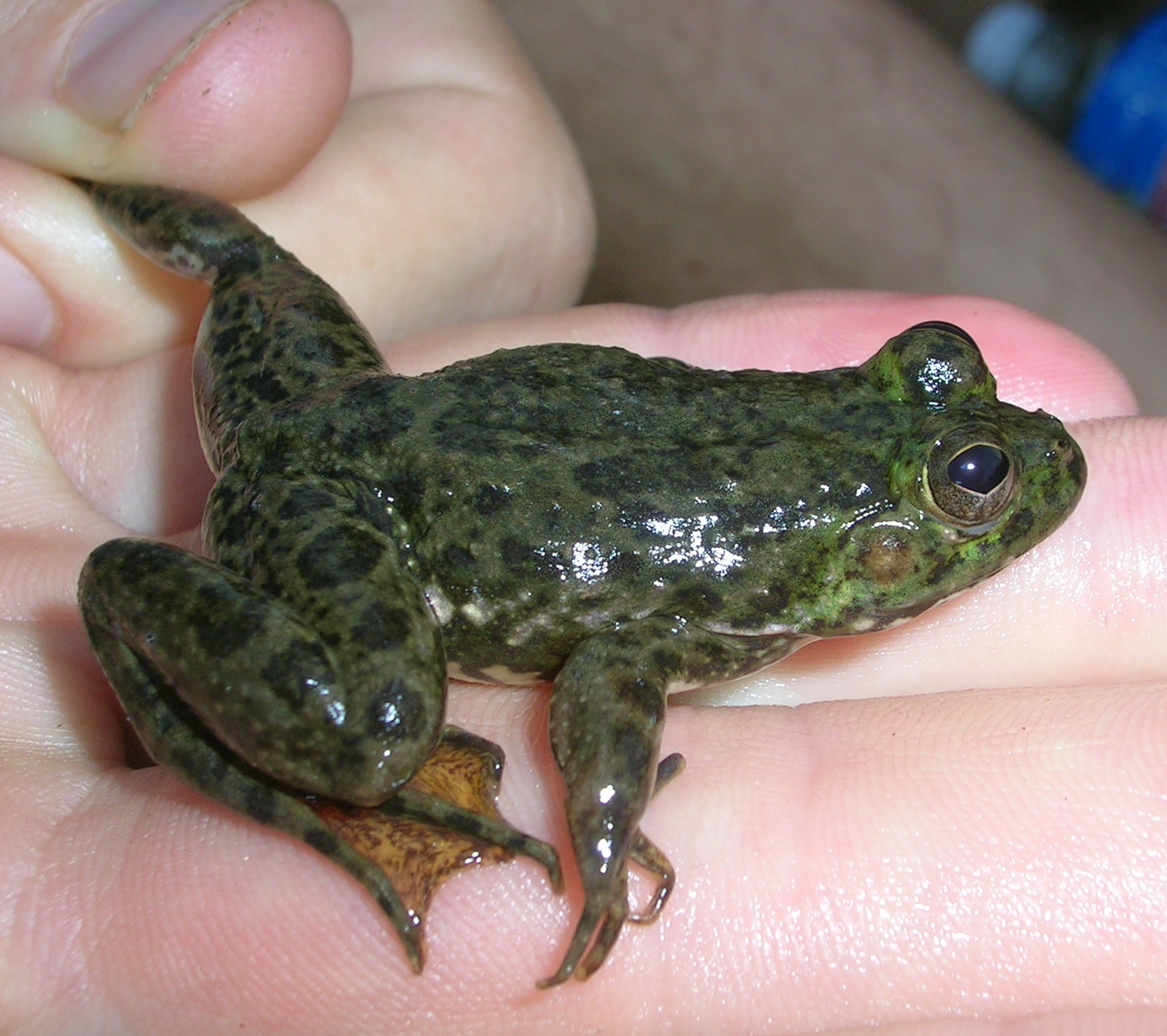
- Euphlyctis cyanophlyctis from Thiruvannamalai, Tamil Nadu, India

Scientific classification
- Domain: Eukaryota
- Kingdom: Animalia
- Phylum: Chordata
- Class: Amphibia
- Order: Anura
- Family: Dicroglossidae
- Genus: Euphlyctis; Fitzinger, 1843

Species
- See text

= Euphlyctis =

Genus of amphibians

Euphlyctis is a genus of frogs in family Dicroglossidae distributed from the southwestern Arabian Peninsula, Pakistan and Afghanistan to India, Nepal, through Myanmar and Thailand to Malaya, and Sri Lanka. None of the four species assessed by the IUCN is considered threatened.

== Species ==
There are eight species recognised in the genus Euphlyctis:

- Euphlyctis aloysii (Joshy, Alam, Kurabayashi, Sumida, and Kuramoto, 2009)
- Euphlyctis cyanophlyctis (Schneider, 1799)
- Euphlyctis ehrenbergii (Peters, 1863)
- Euphlyctis ghoshi (Chanda, 1991)
- Euphlyctis hexadactylus (Lesson, 1834)
- Euphlyctis jaladhara (Dinesh K, Channakeshavamurthy B, Deepak P, Shabnam A, Ghosh A, and Deuti K, 2022)
- Euphlyctis kalasgramensis (Howlader, Nair, Gopalan, and Merilä, 2015)
- Euphlyctis karaavali (Priti, Naik, Seshadri, Singal, Vidisha, Ravikanth, and Gururaja, 2016)
- Euphlyctis kerala (Dinesh, Channakeshavamurthy, Deepak, Ghosh, and Deuti, 2021)
- Euphlyctis mudigere (Joshy, Alam, Kurabayashi, Sumida, and Kuramoto, 2009 was placed into the synonymy of Euphlyctis cyanophlyctis)
