= 2002 Kumarakom boat disaster =

Capsizing of a passenger boat in Kumarakom, India

Kumarakom boat tragedy
- Date: 27 July 2002
- Time: 6:00 AM (IST, UTC+05:30)
- Location: Kumarakom, Kottayam, Kerala, India
- Type: Boat capsizing
- Deaths: 29

The Kumarakom boat accident occurred on 27 July 2002 morning, when a passenger boat sank, that was travelling from Muhamma in Alappuzha to Kumarakom in Kottayam, Kerala, India. The accident happened nearly one kilometer before reaching the Kumarakom jetty. 29 people, including a nine-month-old baby and 15 women died in the accident.

== Details ==
The boat number A 53 of the Kerala State Water Transport Department, which was going to Kumarakom from Muhamma with full passengers at 5.45 in the morning met with the accident. Most of the people on the boat were the PSC candidates from Muhamma, Kaipuram and Puthanangady areas who had gone to Kottayam to appear for the last grade servant examination. The boat also carried hired laborers and fishmongers who were regular passengers. It is believed that the accident happened when the boat carrying more people hit the sandbar in the lake. Among the 29 dead were 15 women and a 9-month-old baby.

== Aftermath ==
The justice Narayana Kurup commission appointed to investigate the accident had recommended a financial assistance of Rs 91.6 lakh for the kin of the deceased. However, as of 2012, 1 lakh rupees has been paid so far for each. Four people including the boat master faced trial for 15 years in the case following the accident. They were released by the court in 2019. The boat that caused the accident was later auctioned by the water transport department.

== See also ==
- 2009 Thekkady boat disaster
- 2007 Thattekkad boat disaster
- 2023 Tanur boat disaster
