= 2009 Thekkady boat disaster =

Capsizing of a passenger boat in Kerala, India

Coordinates: 9°34′32.7″N 77°10′45.3″E

Thekkady boat tragedy
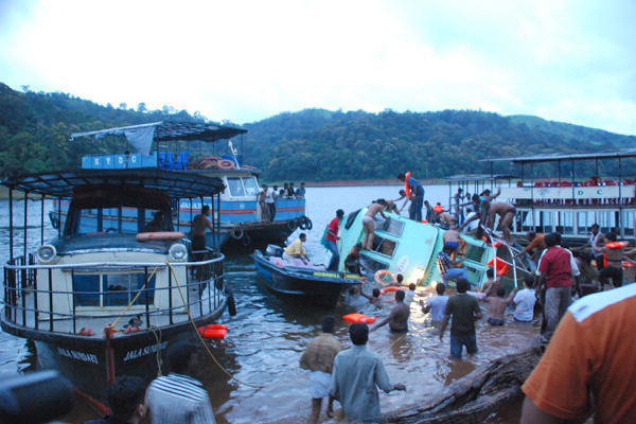
- The Jalakanyaka, listing, is in a red square
- Date: 30 September 2009
- Location: Lake Thekkady, Periyar National Park, Kerala, India
- Type: Boat sinking
- Outcome: Sinking of the Jalakanyaka
- Deaths: 45
- Passengers & Crew: 82

The Thekkady boat disaster occurred on 30 September 2009, when the double-decker passenger boat Jalakanyaka sank in Lake Thekkady, Periyar National Park, Kerala, India. When the boat capsized, 45 tourists died, most of them from Delhi and Kolkata. A total of 82 people were on the boat. The boat's helmsman, Victor Samuel, and another crew member were arrested on 5 October. It is the deadliest maritime accident reported in Kerala.

== Details ==
The fibreglass double-decker sight-seeing boat Jala Kanyaka, operated by the Kerala Tourism Development Corporation (KTDC), made daily sight-seeing trips in the Mullaperiyar reservoir in Idukki. The boat was first commissioned on 17 August 2009.

The boat set off from a landing at 4:30 p.m. and capsized 7 kilometres (4.3 mi) away, at approximately 5 p.m. on 30 September 2009. It capsized in one of the deepest parts of the reservoir, in an area around 100 feet (30 m) deep. Most of the victims were women.

Several survivors swam to safety.

== Rescue ==
The surrounding area has wild animals, including elephants, and is within the 777 square kilometres (300 sq mi) Periyar Tiger Reserve.

By 8 p.m, a rescue team recovered 26 bodies, and two survivors. Initial rescue operations were completed by local government officials and the public before the state and federal government crews arrived. Also the crew of Malayalam movie Body Guard was shooting nearby. Their lights and crew members aided the authorities in rescue operations. None of the initial rescue boats had divers, however a team of divers from the Indian Navy was assigned to help the rescue operation 5–6 hours later. A team of 40-50 navy divers were rushed to the spot from the Southern Naval Command at Kochi. On 3 October, the search for bodies was still ongoing.

Four bodies were noted as missing until 3 October, when three were recovered by Navy divers: four-and-a-half-year-old Aishwarya and her mother Senthilkumari, from Bangalore, and Apoorva, 16, from Hyderabad. A Navy helicopter spotted the body of Aishwarya first, and her mother was found nearby. The final missing passenger, Apoorva's 19-year-old brother Abhilash, was discovered on the evening of 3 October by an underwater camera, but bad weather delayed its retrieval until the following day. This bought the final death-toll to 45. Their parents, scientists at the Defence Research Organisation, survived the accident. There were 20 people rescued in total.

Both State and National government acted, asking defence establishments in Kochi and Thiruvananthapuram to launch rescue attempts. Navy divers from Kochi were forced to travel overland after their helicopter, sent to locate the victims, was turned back by bad weather.

Kodiyeri Balakrishnan, the Home and Tourism Minister of Kerala, and N. K. Premachandran, the minister for Water Resources, arrived in Thekkady late at night, and they coordinated rescue operations according to press reports.

== Investigations ==
Originally, KTDC claimed that there were 74 passengers, but police findings showed 87 passengers; some confusion in the numbers was caused by some survivors leaving the scene without reporting to the police.

The fatalities consist mostly of women, mainly from outside Kerala. The dead included people from Tamil Nadu, Delhi and West Bengal; more than 50 belonged to a group from Karnataka, who had come in a tourist bus to Thekkady as part of a tour to Kerala.

Preliminary reports stated that the accident occurred when a large number of passengers rushed to one side of the boat to see a herd of bison which emerged from the forest. The sudden movement caused the boat to capsize, and all of the passengers were thrown into the water.

Later, this initial report was challenged when some of the rescued tourists reported structural problems with the boat, saying that it was tilted throughout the trip, for about 30 minutes. Then at one point the boat took a sharp turn, overturned and capsized.

The boat was owned and operated by the Kerala Tourism Development Corporation. The government has been blamed for not privatizing these boats, for not enforcing safety precautions and for not having efficient disaster recovery plans. The crew of the boat, driver and helper escaped the incident. The passengers were not provided a life jacket before the trip, and there were no lifeguards.

The Pioneer newspaper of Delhi reported "widespread complaints" against both Kerala Government and KTDC "trying to absolve themselves of the guilt by putting the entire blame on the boat employees." The Crime Branch's probe report blamed the incident on a combination of driver negligence and overloading.

== Aftermath ==
On 2 October, it was announced that the government would pay the expenses for sending the bodies of the deceased to their home states and that 5 lakhs Rs. would be provided to the next kin of each of the dead in the accident. The Government of Kerala ordered a judicial inquiry into the boat tragedy.

Questioned at the scene on Monday, 5 October, helmsman Victor Samuel (alias Betty) attributed the incident to the sudden movement of tourists, but fellow crew member Aneesh (also written Anish) pointed out the overloading of the upper deck. Preliminary inquiries revealed that the boat was overloaded, with 12 more than its capacity of 75. The Crime Branch determined that when Samuel "suddenly turned the boat to the right, after the tourists sighted the wild animals", it had contributed to the incident. Superintendent of Police (Crime Branch) PA Wilson said that "the unwarranted act of driver Victor Samuel [...] swerving the boat while at high speed caused the tragedy". The Crime Branch did not make a final report, pending further questioning of survivors, but Samuel and Aneesh were arrested, to be taken before the Magistrate Court at Peerumade. Samuel has been charged with "causing death unintentionally."

Also under consideration was the possibility raised by reports that the boat listed to one side due to a structural imbalance. The police stated that the Jalakanyaka, which was recovered and brought to the dock in Thekkady, "had inherent problems". A careful forensic examination was scheduled to begin.

== Criticism ==
Oommen Chandy, Leader of Opposition in the Kerala Assembly, criticized the ongoing Crime Branch probe, alleging an attempt to make the steersman a scapegoat. "an attempt is on to put the blame and responsibility of the accident on the steersman," Chandy said.

He urged Chairman Cherian Philip to consider quitting his post. "Instead of supervising the rescue operations at Thekkady, Philip chose to be part of' Human Chain', a political function of CPI-M," he said.

The Decclan Herald said that the accident was "a result of sheer negligence", and the Express Buzz said it was "faulty from the start", with excess passengers on unsecured plastic chairs.

Other criticisms include (1) lack of disaster recovery planning and procedures for all departments; and (2) refusal to privatize and insure tourist boats with proper government oversight.

== Subsequent safety concerns ==
At a meeting on 5 October, state Tourism Minister Kodiyeri Balakrishnan announced several new safety measures: safety checks for tourist boats, mandatory life jackets for those under 15 and for those over 15 who do not supply a valid reason, lifeguards and rescue boats in proportion to the number of passengers.

== See also ==
- 2002 Kumarakom boat disaster
- 2007 Thattekkad boat disaster
- 2023 Tanur boat disaster
