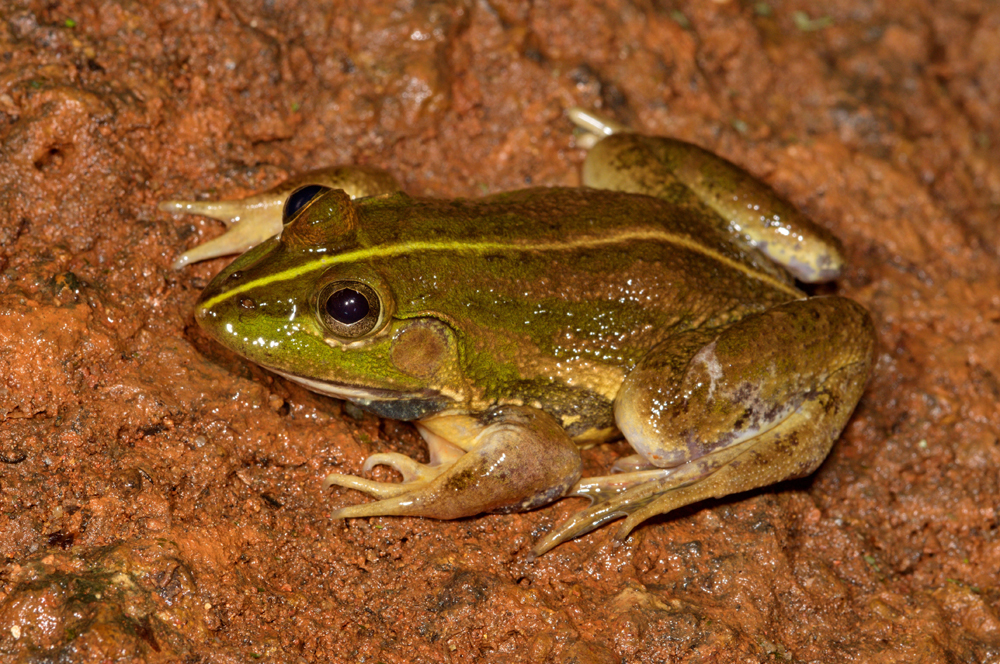
- Holotype male

Scientific classification
- Kingdom: Animalia
- Phylum: Chordata
- Class: Amphibia
- Order: Anura
- Family: Dicroglossidae
- Genus: Euphlyctis
- Species: E. karaavali

Binomial name
- Euphlyctis karaavali Priti, Naik, Seshadri, Singal, Vidisha, Ravikanth, and Gururaja, 2016

= Euphlyctis karaavali =

Species of frog

Euphlyctis karaavali (Karaavali skittering frog) is a species of frog in the family Dicroglossidae. It is endemic to the southwestern coast of India in Karnataka.

== Description ==
It is a large adult size frog with snout to vent length in males ranging between 55–69 mm and females being larger and up to 106 mm. The snout is obtusely pointed when observed from both dorsal and ventral planes and protrudes beyond the lower jaw. Tongue is spatulate and bifid without lingual papilla. Tympanum is distinct and a supra-tympanic fold from back of eye to forelimb is prominent. Head is wider than long. Skin on dorsum possess granulation. Nuptial pad on finger present in adult males. Two vocal sacs present and deep purple in coloration. Webbing between toes complete. Ventral side with brown reticulation, which gets dense towards the abdomen.

=== Sexual dimorphism ===
Males have nuptial pads. They also possess a pair of vocal sacs on the lower jaw. Adult females are larger than males.

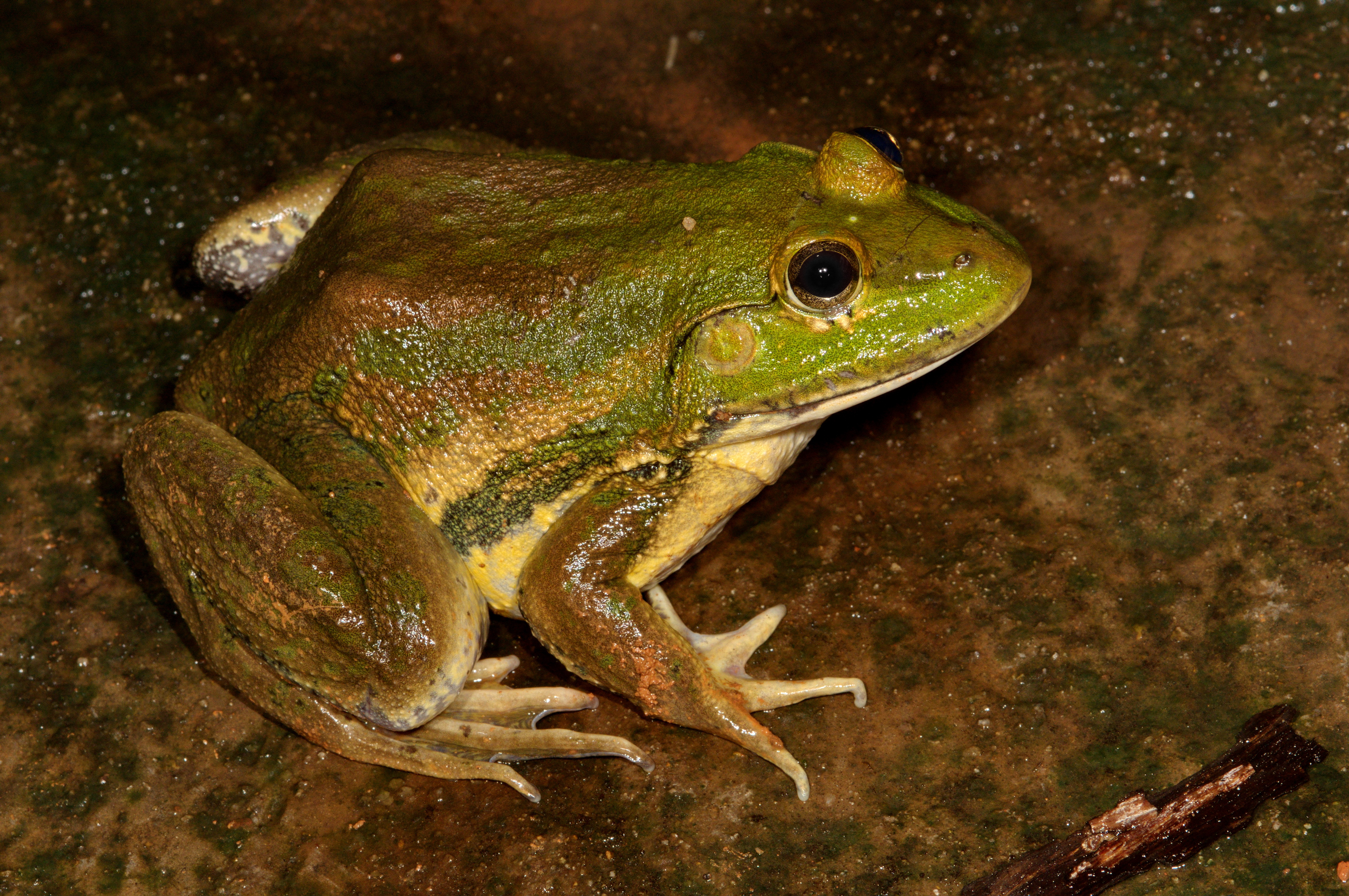
Adult female in life

== Systematics ==
The phylogenetic position of Euphlyctis karaavali, ascertained using a combination of 12s and 16s rRNA sequences, reveals a sister relationship with Euphlyctis aloysii and Euphlyctis hexadactylus

== Distribution ==
This species was described from fallow agriculture fields in the coastal village Sanikatta within Kumta Taluk, Uttara Kannada District, Karnataka. Subsequently, the species was observed from six localities in Karnataka viz., Kodanga, Baire, Chendia, Kadwada, Tariwada, and Konaje. Recently, this species was reported from Tiruvananthapuram in Kerala which is 810 km away from the type locality, Sanikatta

== Ecology and natural history notes ==
It is a common frog species in the region where it is found and can found calling from rainwater inundated fallow agriculture fields, small manmade tanks, pools and puddles around human habitations. Advertisement vocalizations resemble calls of the white-throated kingfisher.

== Etymology ==
The specific name karaavali is derived from the Kannada name for the coastal region where it is found.
