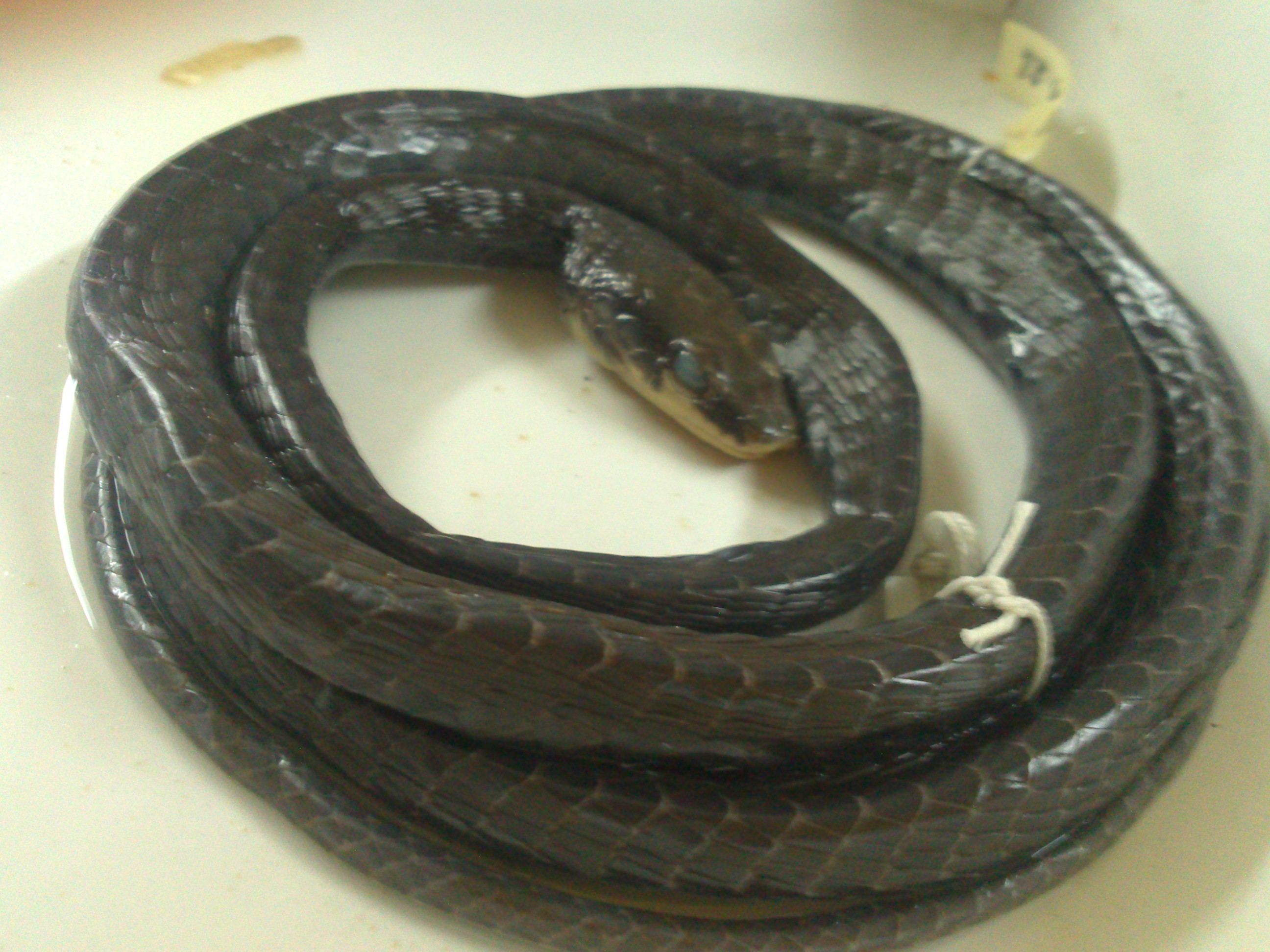

Conservation status
- Least Concern (IUCN 3.1)

Scientific classification
- Kingdom: Animalia
- Phylum: Chordata
- Order: Squamata
- Suborder: Serpentes
- Family: Colubridae
- Subfamily: Ahaetuliinae
- Genus: Dendrelaphis
- Species: D. humayuni

Binomial name
- Dendrelaphis humayuni Tiwari & Biswas, 1973

= Dendrelaphis humayuni =

Species of snake

Dendrelaphis humayuni, also known commonly as the Nicobar bronzeback or Tiwari's bronzeback, is a species of snake in the family Colubridae. The species is endemic to the Nicobar Islands of India.

== Etymology ==
D. humayuni was named after Humayun Abdulali.

== Geographic range ==
D. humayuni is a widely distributed species found in the central and southern Nicobar Islands, but absent from Car Nicobar. The island of Chowra appears to be its northern range boundary, and Great Nicobar Island is its southern range boundary. There is a single record of this species from Camorta Island of Nicobar collected by Wall.

== Characteristics ==
D. humayuni averages a length of 1 m (39 in). It has 172–190 ventral scales. There are 9 supralabials, with 5th and 6th touching the eye in most cases. D. humayuni is mostly confused with Dendrelaphis pictus andamanensis.

== Behavior ==
D. humayuni is diurnal and arboreal.

== Diet ==
D. humayuni preys upon frogs.

== Reproduction ==
D. humayuni is oviparous.
