= 2023 Tanur boat disaster =

Boat capsizing in Malappuram, India

Tanur boat tragedy
- Date: 7 May 2023
- Time: 7:00 PM (IST, UTC+05:30)
- Location: Tanur, Malappuram, Kerala, India; 11°00′57″N 75°51′41″E
- Type: Boat capsizing
- Cause: Capsizing of Atlantic
- Participants: 37
- Deaths: 22
- Injuries: 10

On 7 May 2023, the recreational boat Atlantic capsized in Tanur Beach in Tanur, Malappuram, Kerala, India. The incident, on a boat carrying 37 people, caused 22 deaths and 10 injuries, including 11 children.

== Background ==
Boat mishaps are a common occurrence in India due to vessels frequently being overcrowded, inadequately maintained, and lacking safety equipment. This incident is the fourth deadliest maritime accident in Kerala since India's independence in 1947.

== Incident ==
Thooval Theeram is located on the Parappanangadi-Tanur municipal boundary, on the banks of the Poorapuzha river's estuary, which joins the Arabian Sea at Ottumpuram. The boat was on a leisure trip when it was involved in an accident during its final journey of the day. As per the reports, it was getting dark by the time of the capsizing. The accident occurred between local time 6:30 - 7:00 pm on 7 May 2023. It is alleged that the boat owner converted a fishing boat for tourist services. Later officials confirmed that the boat was operated without a fitness certificate. According to reports, the boat was overcrowded, and no life jackets were issued to passengers while in service. Twenty two people including a family of twelve members on a vacation died in the incident.

When the service of the boat Atlanta started, the fishermen warned not to use it for tourism after finding that its bottom is round. The bottom of the boat should be flat for tourism use. It was a two-story boat and was initially a fishing boat, which was converted for the purpose of tourist services by the owner. When more people boarded, it tilted to one side which caused the accident.

== Rescue and relief ==
Before the arrival of the Kerala Fire and Rescue Services, locals initiated rescue operations, but the crowd in the area hampered the work. Firefighting units from Kozhikode and Malappuram, as well as disaster management personnel, were quickly dispatched to the location. They made efforts to hoist the boat and bring it to shore. The Indian Navy's Chetak helicopter was called in to assist in the search and rescue operation. Underwater cameras were used to track down missing people.

The Central government declared that the families of the deceased will receive a financial assistance of ₹2 lakh (US$2,100) each. The Kerala government declared that they would give a financial assistance of ₹10 lakh (US$10,000) to the families affected.

== Investigation ==
A case was registered against the boat's owner Nasar for culpable homicide. Nasar was arrested on 8 May from Kozhikode. It was reported that he had gone into hiding after the incident.

== Reactions ==
Prime Minister Narendra Modi and Chief Minister Pinarai Vijayan said they were deeply saddened by the tragic accident. The Kerala government declared 8 May 2023 as the day of official mourning and all government programmes were postponed as a mark of respect to the victims. Kerala's opposition leader VD Satheesan, while speaking to media, said, "Nobody even knows if the boat had a licence or not."

== See also ==
- 2002 Kumarakom boat disaster
- 2007 Thattekkad boat disaster
- 2009 Thekkady boat disaster
