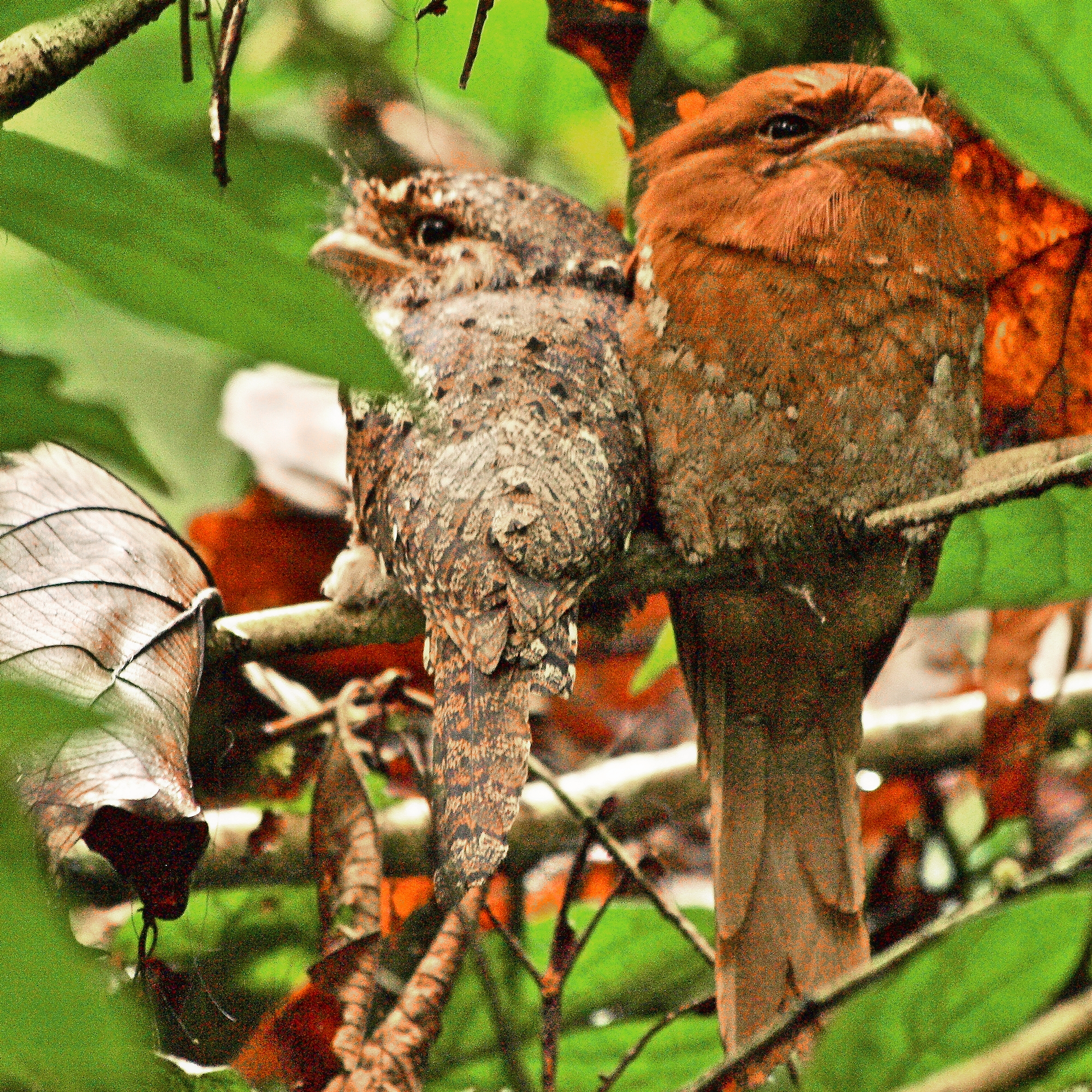
- A pair of subsp. roonwali, with female on right

Conservation status
- Least Concern (IUCN 3.1)

Scientific classification
- Kingdom: Animalia
- Phylum: Chordata
- Class: Aves
- Order: Podargiformes
- Family: Podargidae
- Genus: Batrachostomus
- Species: B. moniliger

Binomial name
- Batrachostomus moniliger Blyth, 1849

Audio
- Calls

= Sri Lanka frogmouth =

Species of bird

The Sri Lanka frogmouth, Sri Lankan frogmouth or Ceylon frogmouth (Batrachostomus moniliger) is a small frogmouth found in the Western Ghats of south India and Sri Lanka. Related to the nightjars, it is nocturnal and is found in forest habitats. The plumage coloration resembles that of dried leaves and the bird roosts quietly on branches, making it difficult to see. Each has a favourite roost that it uses regularly unless disturbed. It has a distinctive call that is usually heard at dawn and dusk. The sexes differ slightly in plumage.

== Description ==
This bird reaches 23 centimetres (9.1 in) in length. Like all frogmouths, this species has a wide and hooked bill with slit-like nostrils and the large head with eyes facing forward to provide a wide field of binocular vision. Compared to others of its genus it has small wings, which are distinguished by the wing coverts ending in black spots tipped with white. The male is gray-brown with fine barring and a spotted crown. Some males are browner and look more similar to females. The female is more rufous or chestnut brown. Indian female birds have very fine black speckles on the crown but Sri Lankan females may lack or may have reduced markings. The bird also has short, stiff bristles in front of and surrounding the eyes. The Western Ghats population, ssp. roonwali (named after Mithan Lal Roonwal), looks very slightly different. The male has a brownish-grey wing mirror and yellowish spots on the undersides, compared to grey or white in the nominate Sri Lankan form. The female has a bright reddish-brown wing mirror and the wings are unspotted below.

== Habitat and distribution ==
This species is found in the Western Ghats of southwest India and Sri Lanka. Its habitat is tropical forest, usually with dense undergrowth. It can sometimes be found in more disturbed habitats, including plantations. Its presence may be overlooked due to its nocturnal behaviour and camouflage.

== Behaviour ==
This frogmouth is rarely seen during the day except at roost sites or when flushed. It regularly uses the same roost spot for months. When alarmed at its perch, it slowly moves its head, pointing its bill upward, and it can easily be mistaken for a jagged, broken branch. It relies on this crypsis and will often sit still a long time before making an escape. It may open its mouth wide in a threat display. Like its congeners, it feeds on insects, catching them in flight or gleaning them from the ground or tree branches. It is sometimes mobbed at its day roost by small songbirds. It is vocal at dusk, the call of the female being a loud, screechy "shkeerauuw" which drops in volume and ends is a series of hiccups. Another call is a series of rapid "skwar-skwar-skwar" which is produced by both male and female.

The breeding season in southern India is January to April, and in Sri Lanka February to March. The nest is a small pad made of moss lined with down and covered on the outside with lichens and bark. The bird incubates a single white egg, covering the nest and holding the tail flush with the tree, taking on the outline of a lichen-covered snag. The male often broods during the day, while both parents share the duty during the night. After the chick fledges, the male destroys the nest. The parents often use the same branch for multiple nestings. The juvenile may stay with the parents for a couple of months, huddling between them at the roost.

== Gallery ==
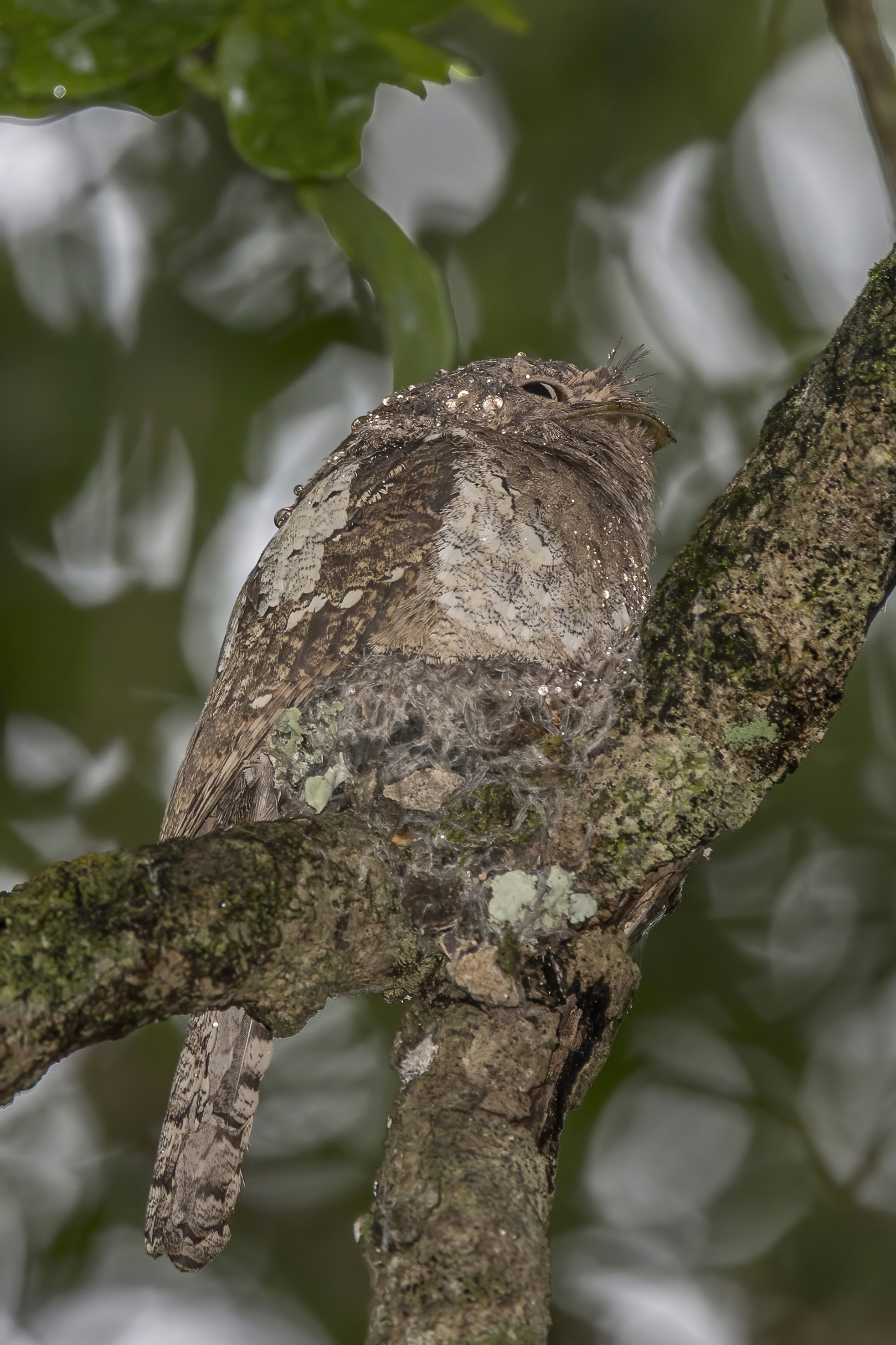
B. m. moniliger female on nest, Gal Oya, Sri Lanka

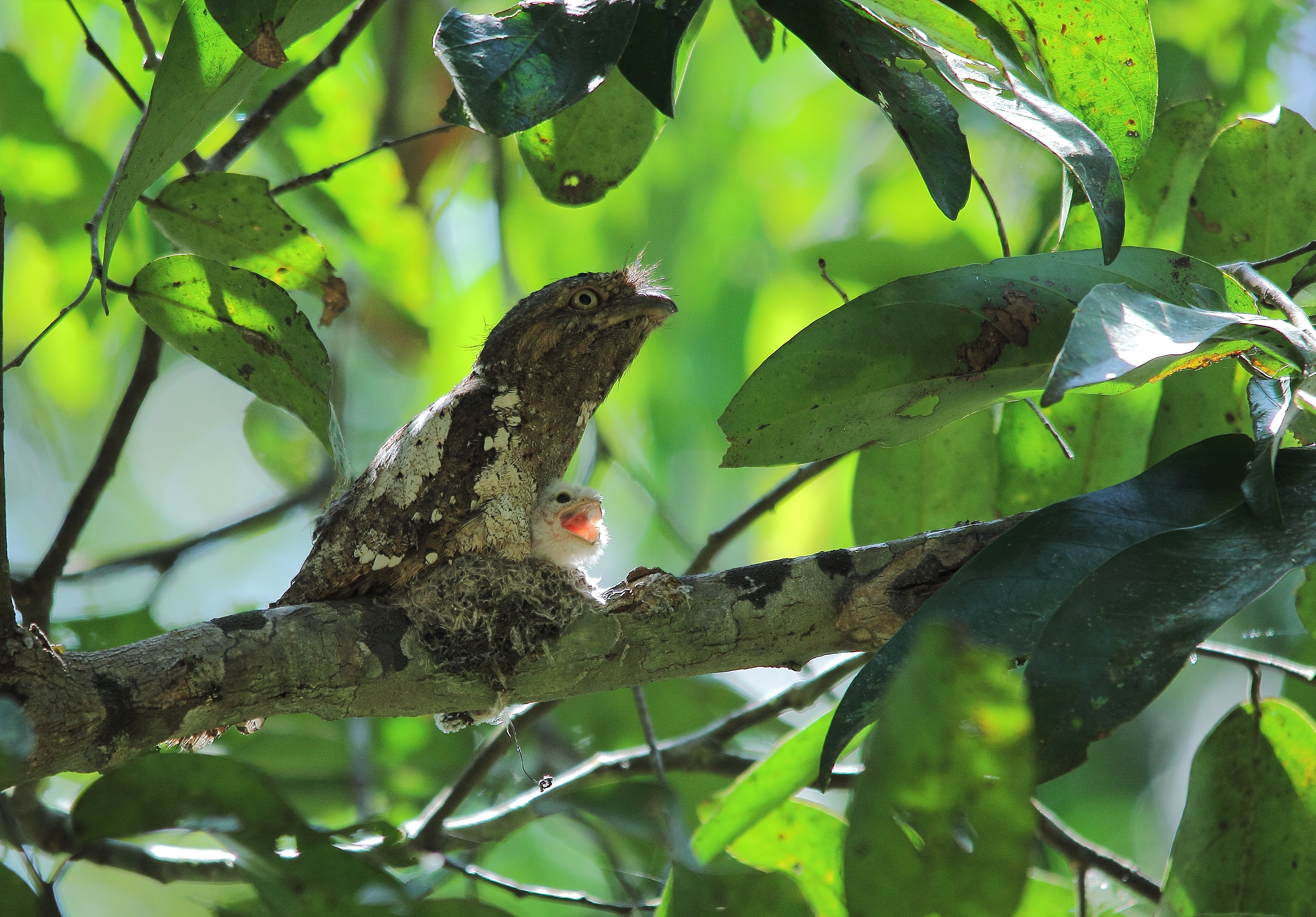
B. m. roonwali on a nest with a recently hatched chick

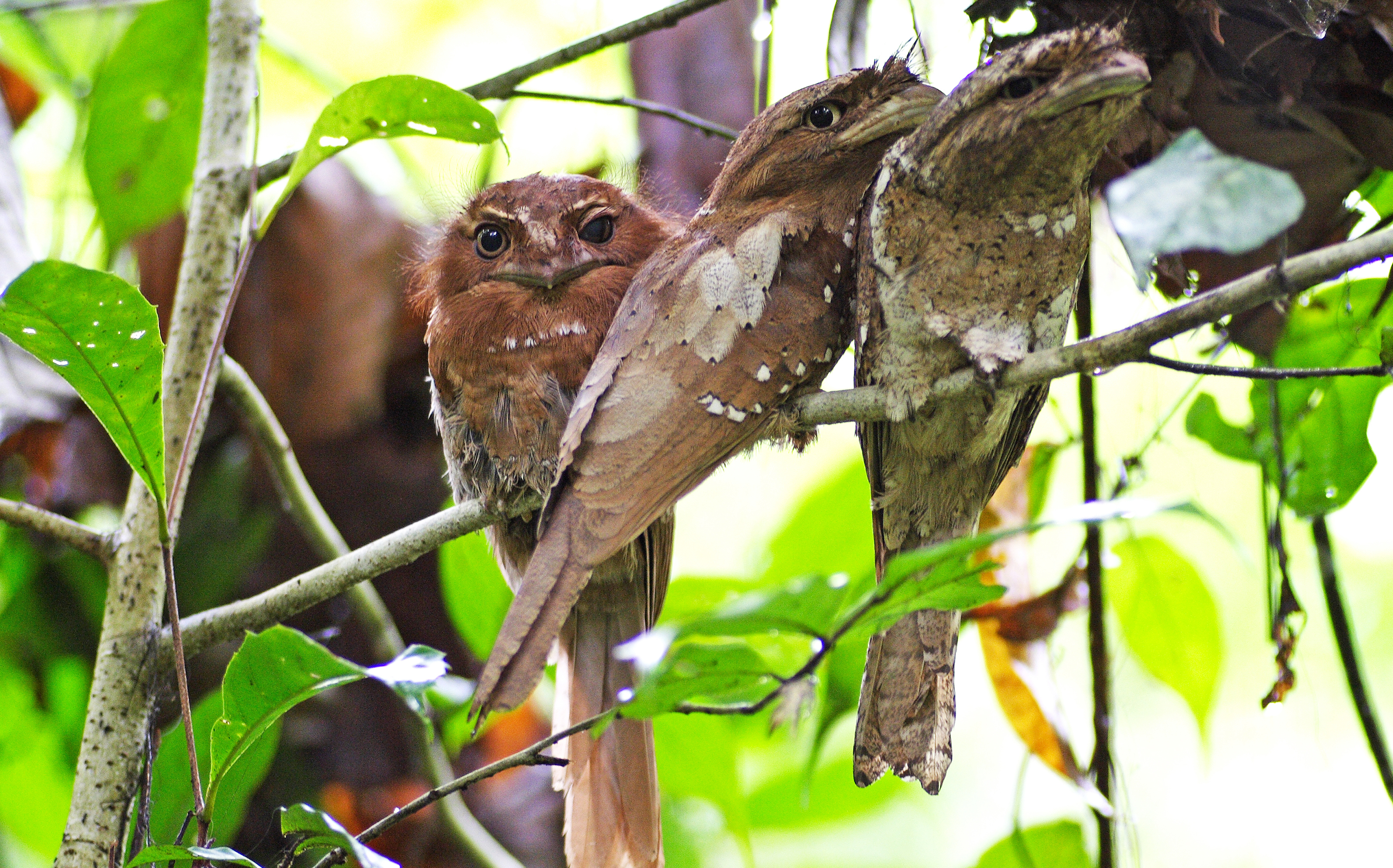
B. m. roonwali young bird (middle) with adult female to left and male to right

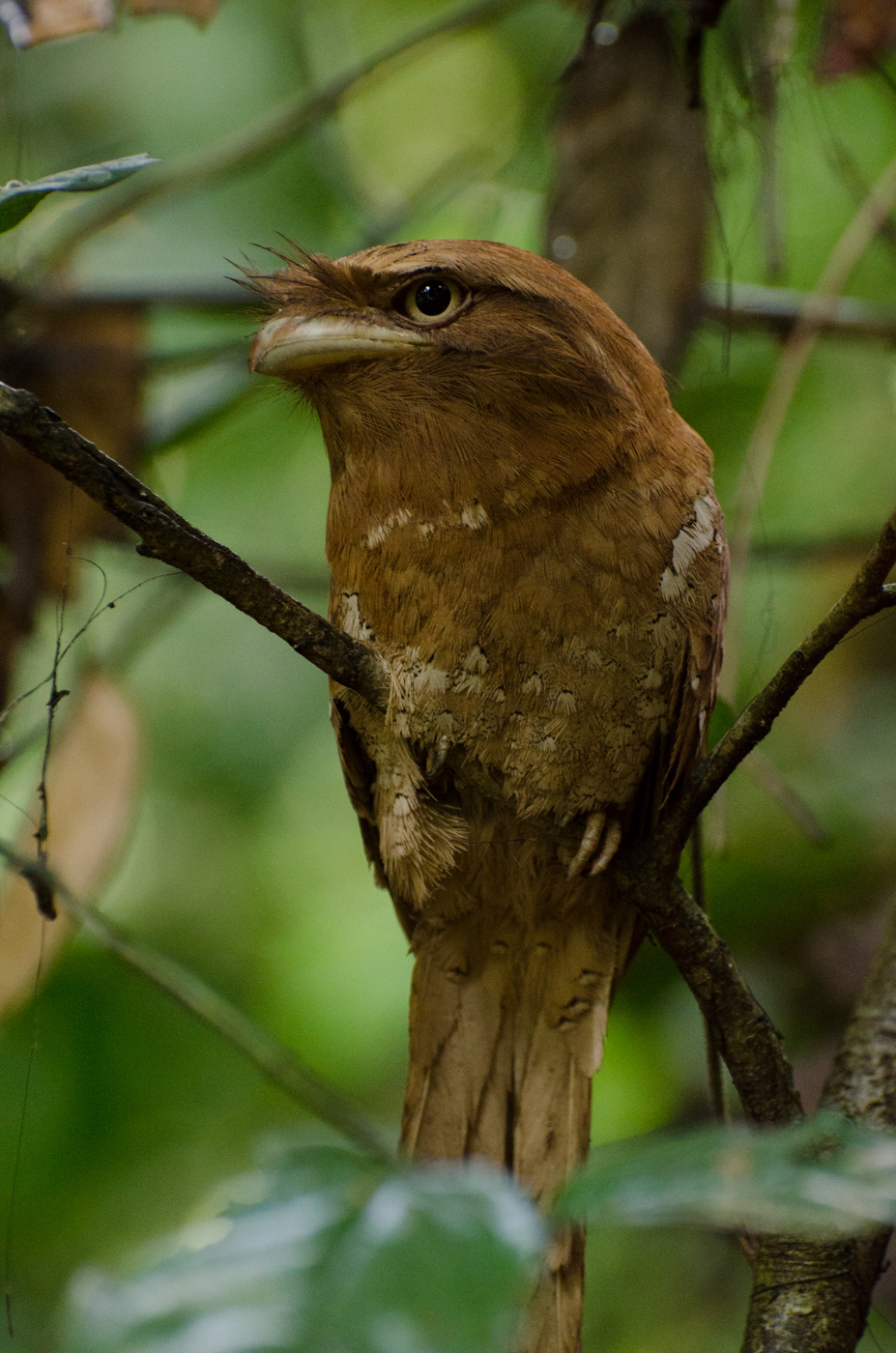
B. m. roonwali at Thattekad Bird Sanctuary, India
