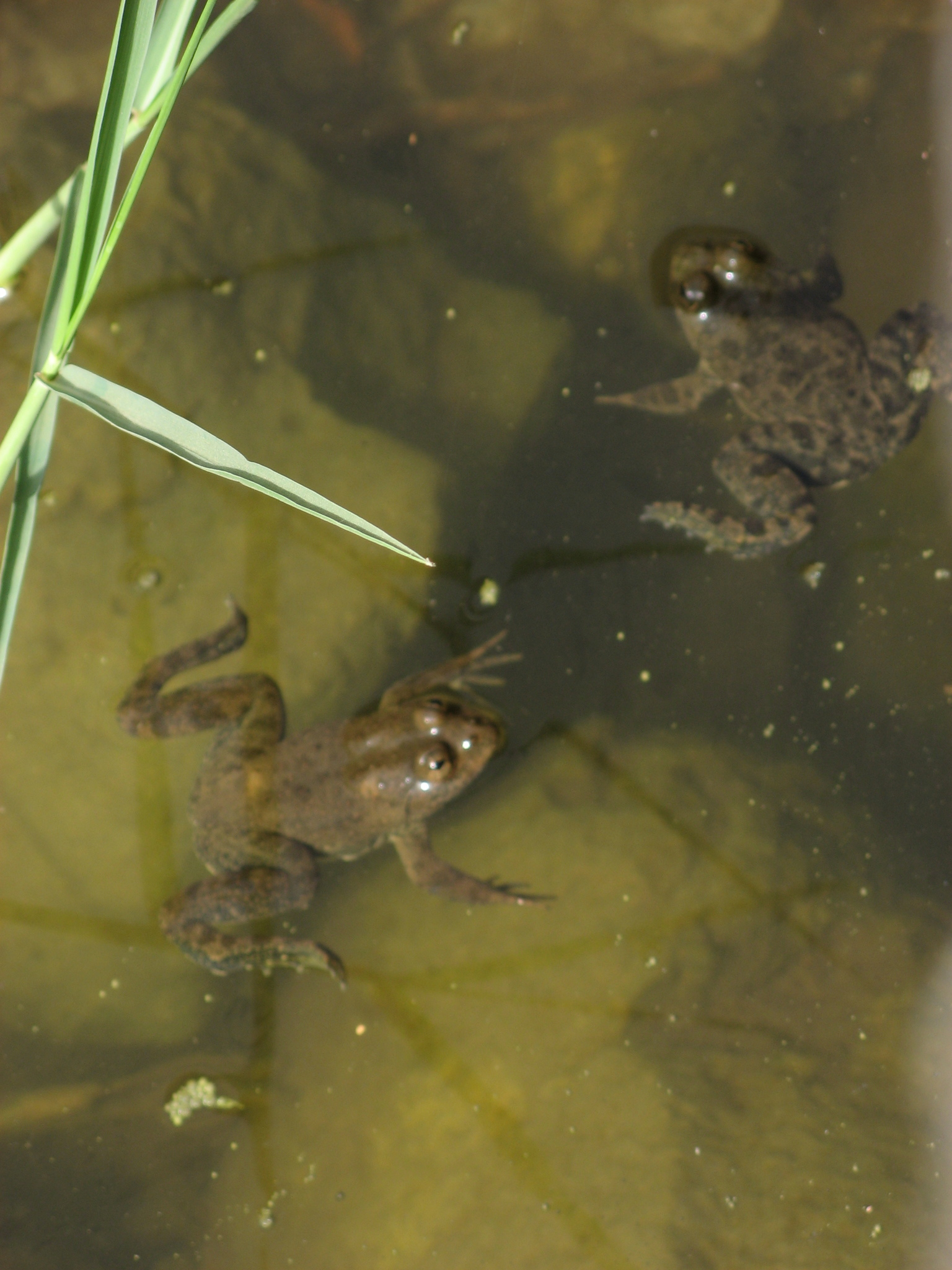

Conservation status
- Least Concern (IUCN 3.1)

Scientific classification
- Kingdom: Animalia
- Phylum: Chordata
- Class: Amphibia
- Order: Anura
- Family: Dicroglossidae
- Genus: Euphlyctis
- Species: E. ehrenbergii

Binomial name
- Euphlyctis ehrenbergii (Peters, 1863)

Synonyms
- Rana ehrenbergii Peters, 1863; Rana cyanophlyctis ssp. ehrenbergi Parker, 1941

= Euphlyctis ehrenbergii =

Species of amphibian

Euphlyctis ehrenbergii (Arabian five-fingered frog or Arabian skittering frog) is a species of frog in the family Dicroglossidae. It is endemic to the southwestern Arabian Peninsula in Saudi Arabia and Yemen. It has been treated as a subspecies of Euphlyctis cyanophlyctis, but is now considered as a valid species. The specific name ehrenbergii honours Christian Gottfried Ehrenberg (1795–1876), a German natural scientist.

E. ehrenbergii is restricted to areas of permanent and temporary water in the Red Sea coast of Yemen and Saudi Arabia. A very aquatic species, it can also be present in irrigated areas.
