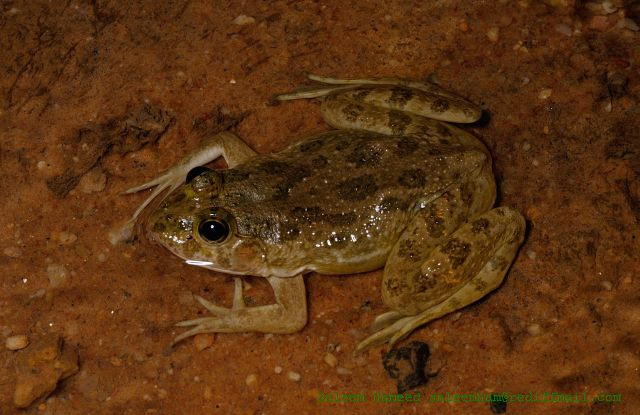
- A female Euphlyctis cyanophlyctis
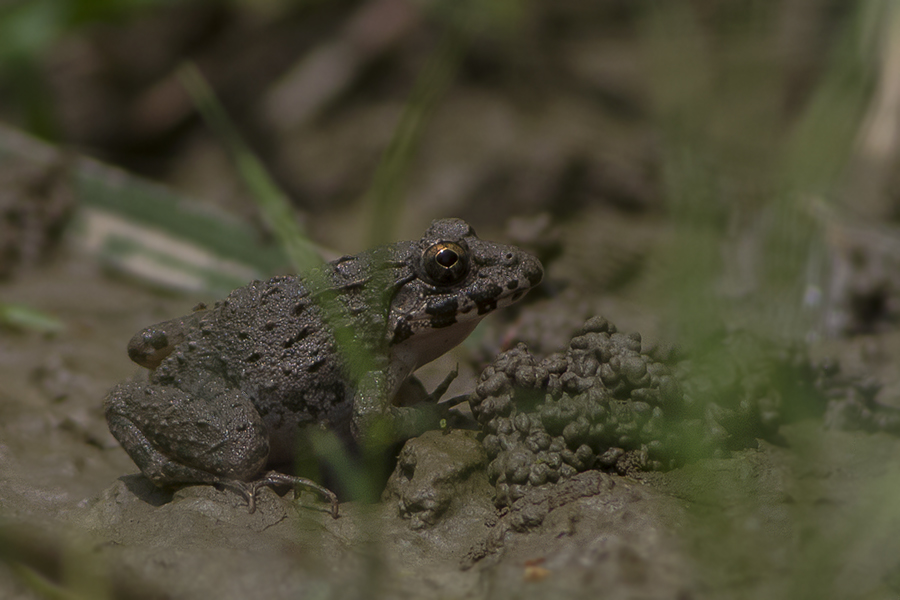
- Female (♀) from West Bengal, India

Conservation status
- Least Concern (IUCN 3.1)

Scientific classification
- Kingdom: Animalia
- Phylum: Chordata
- Class: Amphibia
- Order: Anura
- Family: Dicroglossidae
- Genus: Euphlyctis
- Species: E. cyanophlyctis

Binomial name
- Euphlyctis cyanophlyctis (Schneider, 1799)

Synonyms
- Rana cyanophlyetis Schneider, 1799; Rana cyanophlyctis (Schneider, 1799); Rana bengalensis Gray, 1830; Rana leschenaultii Duméril and Bibron, 1841; Occidozyga cyanophlyctis (Schneider, 1799)

= Euphlyctis cyanophlyctis =

Species of amphibian skiper frog species

Euphlyctis cyanophlyctis is a common dicroglossid frog found in South Asia. It is known under numerous common names, including Indian skipper frog or skittering frog. They are often seen at the edge of bodies of water with their eyes above the water. They noisily move away from the shore when disturbed, giving them their common name. They are rarely seen outside water.

== Description ==
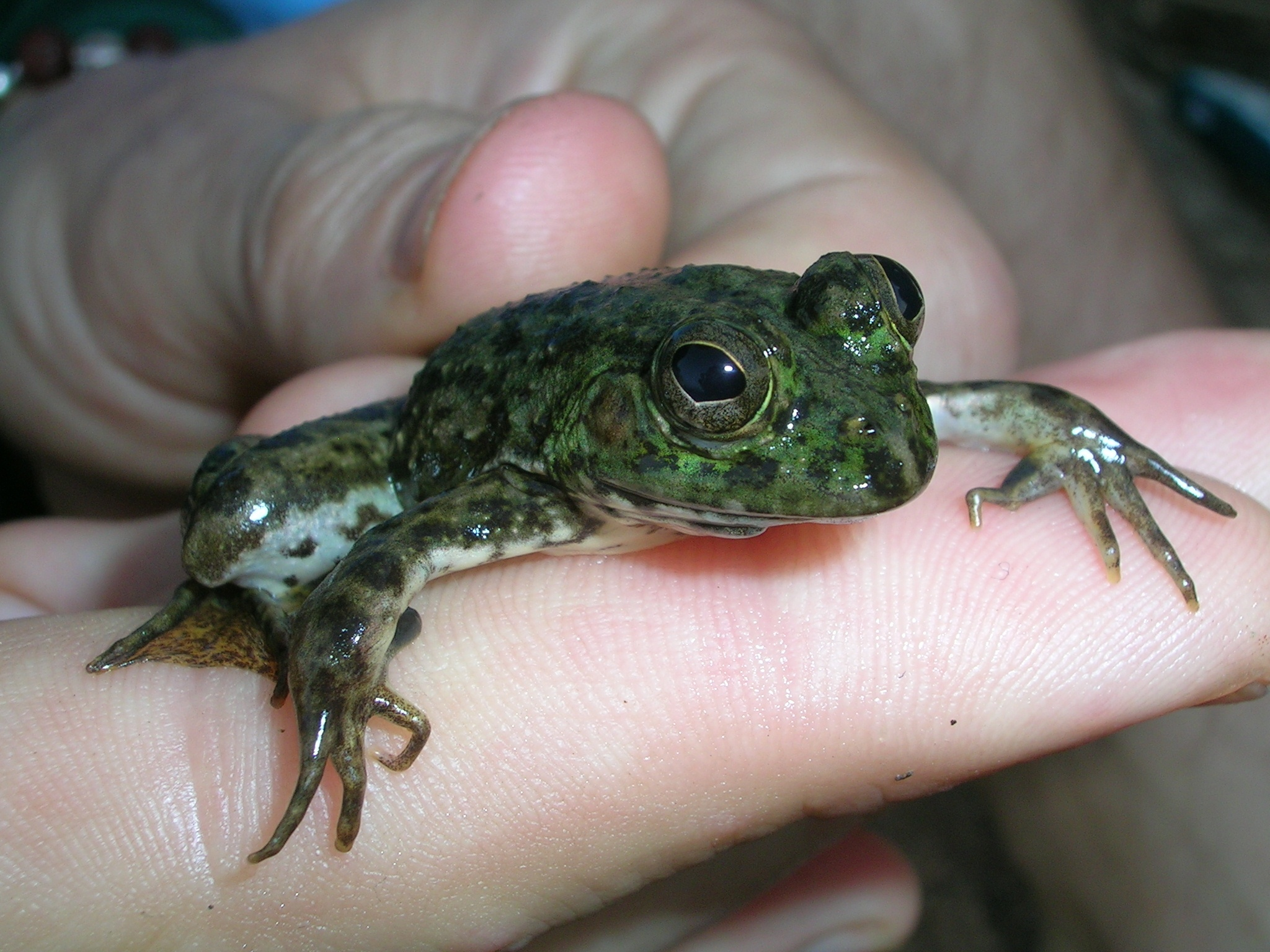
Head showing the nostrils opening at the top

Description from George Albert Boulenger is: «Vomerine teeth in two small oblique series extending a little beyond the hinder edge of the choanae. Head moderate; snout scarcely pointed; canthus rostralis indistinct; interorbital space much narrower than the upper eyelid; tympanum distinct, about two-thirds the size of the eye. Fingers slender, pointed, first not extending beyond second; toes webbed to the tips, which are pointed, fourth not much longer than third or fifth; outer toe strongly fringed; subarticular tubercles small; inner metatarsal tubercle small, conical, much like a rudimentary toe. The tibiotarsal articulation usually reaches a little beyond the eye. Skin with small tubercles and units above, and with more or less distinct rows of pores. Brown or olive above, dark spotted or marbled; two blackish streaks on the hinder side of the thighs, seldom absent; beneath often speckled with blackish. Male with two external vocal vesicles, opening by two slits beneath the angles of the mouth.»

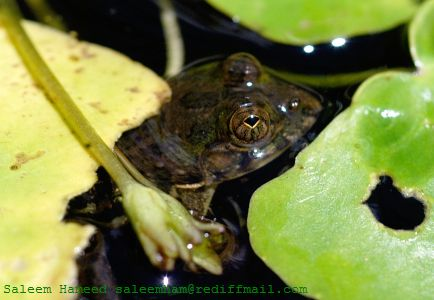
Characteristic square pupil

They have the ability to leap out of the water from a floating position. Cross section of the phalanx bones shows annual growth rings which may be used for determining age.

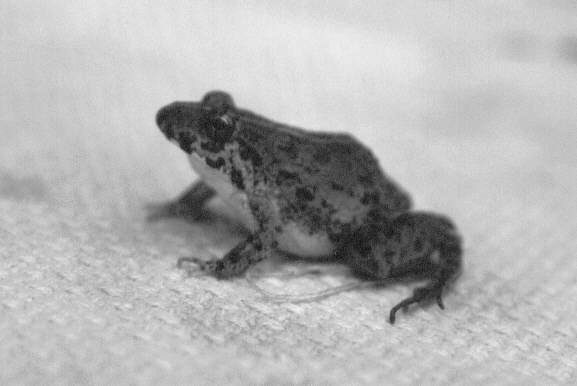

== Distribution ==
The species is widely distributed in South Asia and Southeast Asia, from southeastern Iran, southern Afghanistan, Pakistan, Bhutan, Nepal, and eastern India at low to moderate elevations east through Bangladesh and northeastern India to extreme western Myanmar. In addition, records exist from Sri Lanka (likely Eyphlyctis mudigere), Thailand (possibly introduced), and Vietnam. It has recently been reported also from Bhutan. Records for Bangladesh have recently been reassigned to Euphlyctis kalasgramensis. The International Union for Conservation of Nature (IUCN) does not include any areas east from India and Bangladesh in the distribution area.

== Taxonomy ==
This widespread species may contain cryptic species. As currently defined, E. cyanophlyctis includes several species as synonyms. These subspecies are sometimes distinguished:

- E. c. cyanophlyctis – common skittering frog
- E. c. seistanica – Seistan skittering frog
- E. c. microspinulata – spiny skittering frog

== Habitat ==
This frog is a very aquatic species found in marshes, pools and various other wetlands.
