= Thattekad Bird Sanctuary =

Bird sanctuary in kerala, India

Thattekkad Bird Sanctuary തട്ടേക്കാട് പക്ഷി സങ്കേതം
- Dr. Salim Ali Bird Sanctuary, Thattekkad Bird Sanctuary
- IUCN category IV (habitat/species management area)
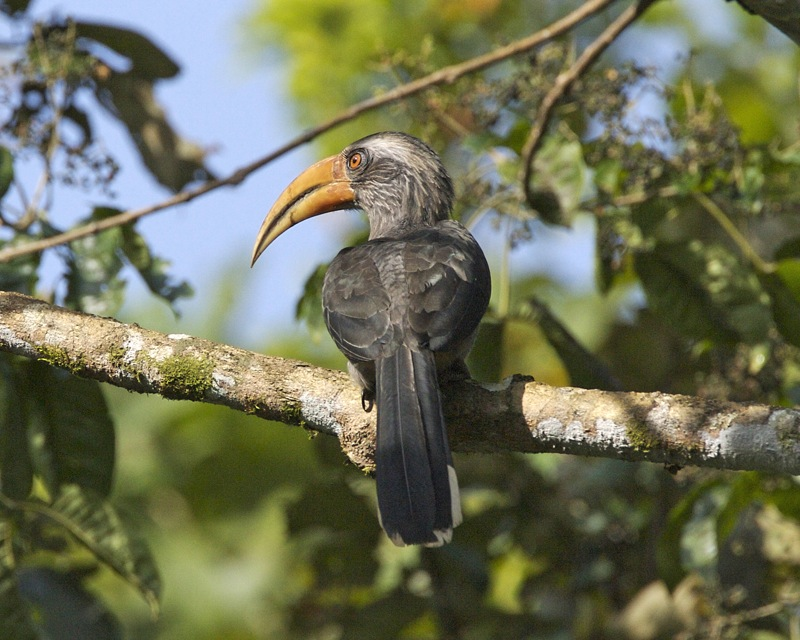
- A Malabar grey hornbill at Thattekkad

- Location within Kerala Location within India
- Interactive map of Thattekkad Bird Sanctuary തട്ടേക്കാട് പക്ഷി സങ്കേതം
- Location: Kothamangalam taluka, Ernakulam district, Kerala state, India
- Nearest city: Kochi (Cochin)
- Coordinates: 10°08′N 76°41′E
- Area: 25.16 km^{2} (6,220 acres)
- Average elevation: 279 m (915 ft)
- Max. elevation: 523 m (1,716 ft)
- Min. elevation: 35 m (115 ft)
- Established: 1983

The Thattekkad Bird Sanctuary covers an area of barely 25 km^{2} (9.7 sq mi) and is located in Kerala state, India. It was the first bird sanctuary in Kerala described by Salim Ali as the richest bird habitat on peninsular India. Thattekkad literally means flat forest, and the region is a deciduous but generally moist low-land forest surrounding the Periyar River, the longest river in Kerala.

== Species ==
The Thattekkad Bird Sanctuary has a rich and varied birdlife. Several species of birds, both forest birds as well as water birds, visit the sanctuaries; notable ones include the following: The Indian pitta, which visits the sanctuary during winter and spends almost six months here.

- Orange-headed thrush
- Large-billed leaf-warbler
- Jerdon's nightjar
- Indian cuckoo
- Oriental darter
- Cormorants
- Whiskered terns
- Collared scops owl
- Ceylon frogmouth
- Grey-fronted green pigeon
- Yellow-browed bulbuls

The sanctuary is a habitat for different varieties of cuckoos and a region of the sanctuary popularly called "Cuckoo Paradise" is home to them, among which are the

- Drongo cuckoo, which may be easily mistaken for drongo,
- Indian hawk cuckoo, which is highly vocal, and the
- Large hawk cuckoo, which looks relatively massive compared to other types of cuckoos, and is characterized by a dark grey and heavily streaked throat.

== See also ==
- Sailana Kharmour Bird Sanctuary
- Salim Ali Bird Sanctuary
