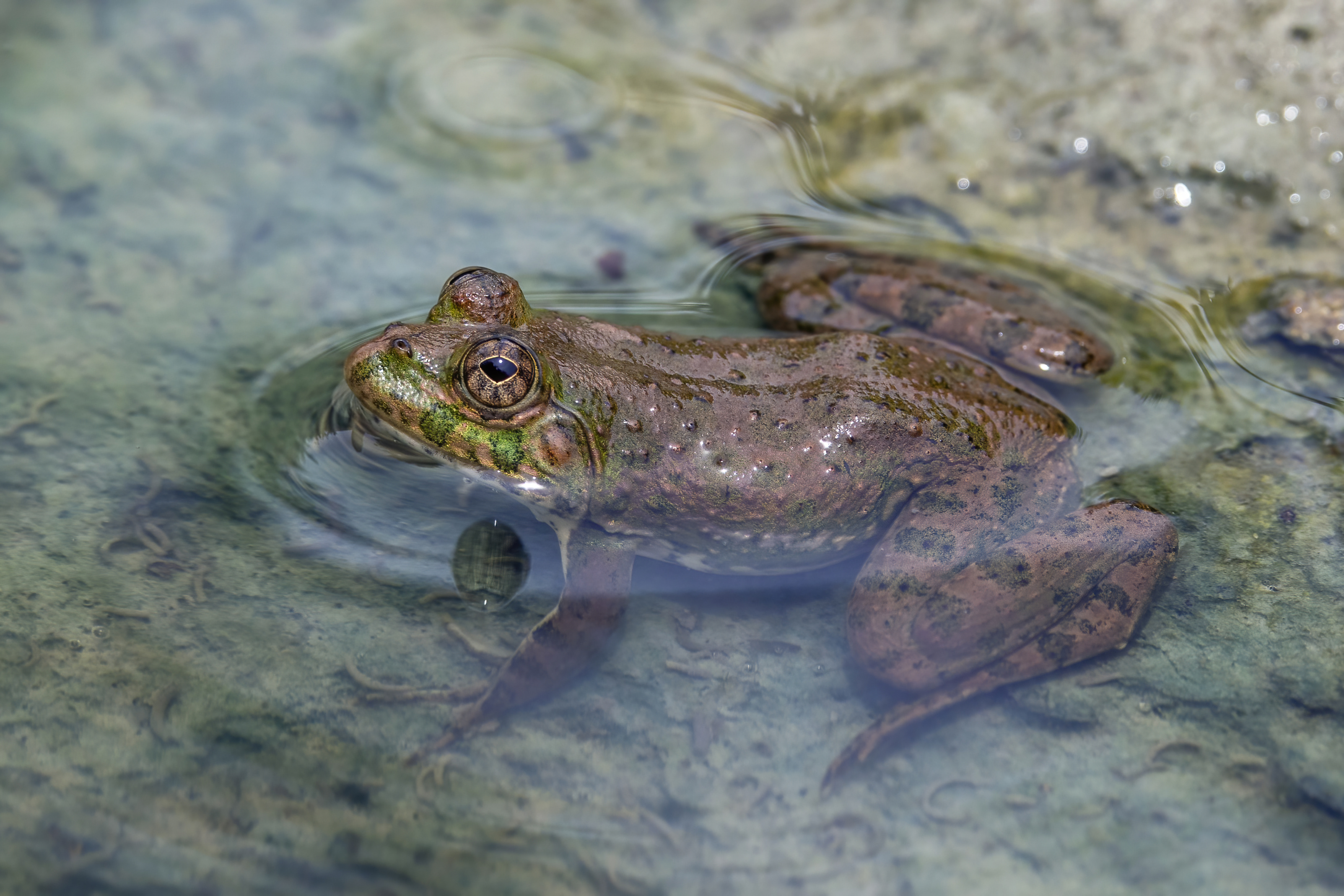

Conservation status
- Least Concern (IUCN 3.1)
- CITES Appendix II (CITES)

Scientific classification
- Kingdom: Animalia
- Phylum: Chordata
- Class: Amphibia
- Order: Anura
- Family: Dicroglossidae
- Genus: Euphlyctis
- Species: E. hexadactylus

Binomial name
- Euphlyctis hexadactylus (Lesson, 1834)

Synonyms
- Rana hexadactyla Lesson, 1834; Rana robusta Blyth, 1855

= Euphlyctis hexadactylus =

Species of amphibian

Euphlyctis hexadactylus, also known as the green pond frog, Indian green frog, and Indian five-fingered frog, is a common species of aquatic frog found in Pakistan, India, Bangladesh, and Sri Lanka. The nominal taxon likely represents a species complex.

== Description ==
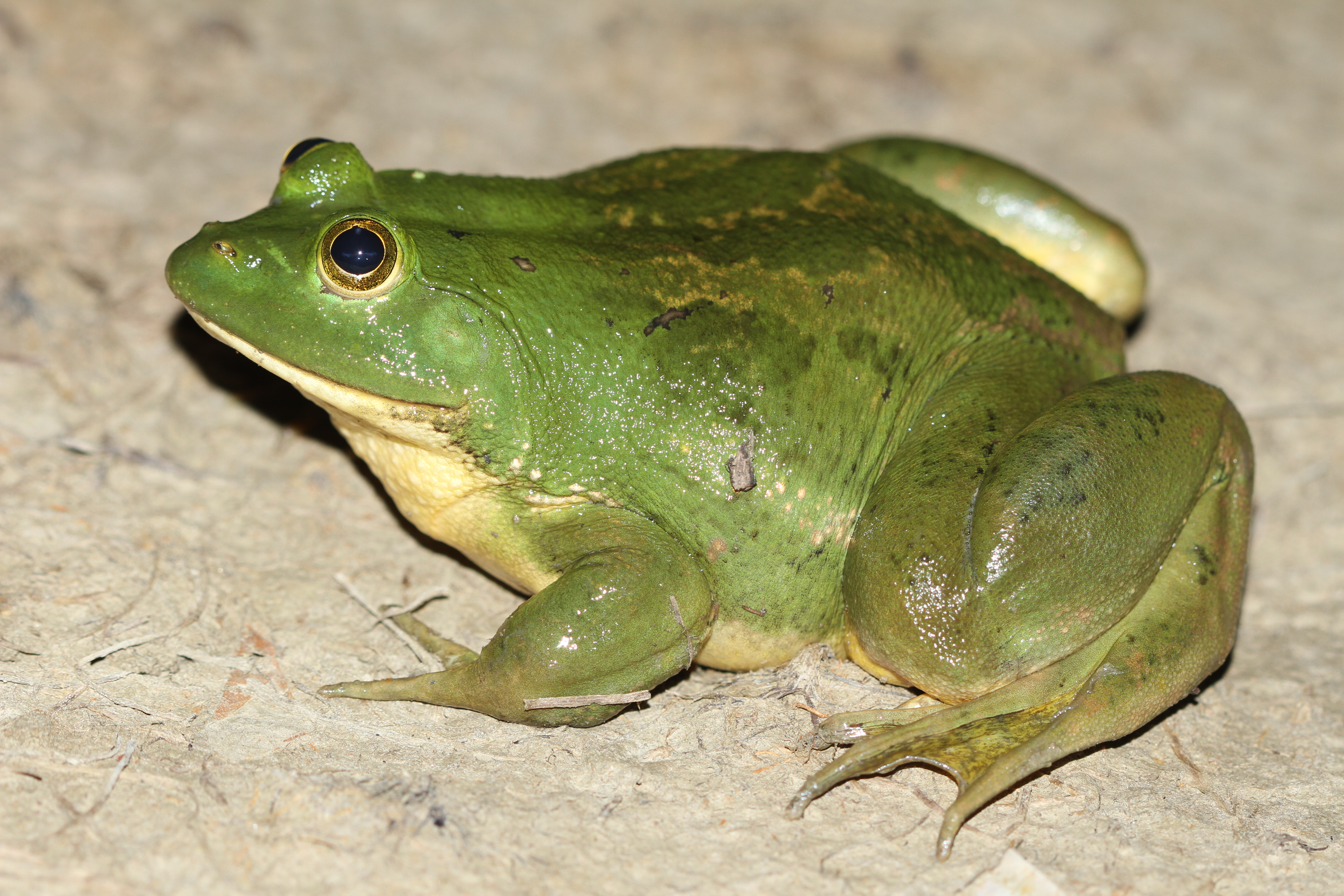
Euphlyctis hexadactylus from India

The following description is from Boulenger:

Vomerine teeth in two oblique series extending beyond the hinder edge of the choanae. Head moderate; snout rather pointed; cauthus rostralis indistinct; intororbital space much narrower than the upper eyelid; tympanum distinct, as large as the eye. Fingers slender, acutely pointed, first extending a little beyond second; toes webbed to the tips, which are acutely pointed; outer toe strongly fringed; fourth toe not very much longer than third or fifth; subarticular tubercles of fingers and toes very small; inner metatarsal tubercle small, conical; no outer tubercle. When the hind limb is corned forwards along the body, the tibio-tarsal articulation reaches the eye. Skin smooth, with more or less distinct rows of pores round the neck, sides, and belly. Brown above; sometimes a light vertebral line: two blackish streaks on the hinder side of the thighs, sometimes indistinct. Young beautifully striped. Male with two external vocal vesicles opening by two slits beneath the angles of the mouth.

== Habitat ==
E. hexadactylus is a largely aquatic species, found in most types of water bodies. It has even been recorded from brackish water in Sri Lanka.

== Diet ==
The diet of adult green pond frogs is unusual in that plant leaves and some flowers constitute a large part of their diets. However, they also consume invertebrates and small vertebrates. Juveniles, however, are insectivores.
