= Sree Venu Gopala Swamy, Purakkad =

Hindu temple in Alappuzha district, Kerala

Sree Venu Gopala Swamy Temple, Purakkad
- Sree Venu Gopala Swamy Temple, Purakkad, Alappuzha, Kerala

Religion
- Affiliation: Hinduism
- District: Alappuzha
- Deity: Venugopalaswamy
- Festivals: Krishna Janmashtami, Kartika Purnima, Navratri

Location
- Location: Purakkad
- State: Kerala
- Country: India
- Interactive map of Sree Venu Gopala Swamy Temple, Purakkad
- Coordinates: 9°21′09.7″N 76°21′58.3″E

Architecture
- Type: Architecture of Kerala

Specifications
- Temple: One
- Elevation: 29.31 m (96 ft)

Sree Venu Gopala Swamy Temple, Purakkad is one of the oldest Gowda Saraswath temples in the world. The main deity is Sree Venu Gopala Swamy. Located in the ancient port city of Purakkad, in Alappuzha the temple was built around 400 years back. Gowda Saraswath Brahmin devotees from all over the world bring their children to perform "Devak Deevop" and "Sodovop".

== History ==
Goa was ruled by Portugal in the late 15th and early 16th century. Portuguese rulers forcefully converted believers of other religion to Christianity. Many people converted to Christianity, but practiced their original tradition secretly. Roman Catholic Brahmin is such a group of Brahmins that were converted to Christianity by Portuguese. In order to preserve the culture and the tradition, many families of Gowda Saraswat Brahmins migrated to ancient port cities of Mangalore, Calicut, Cochin, and Purakkad. Raja of Chembakassery (Ambalapuzha) welcomed the group at Purakkad and provided them land to build a community and their temple.

== Puna-Prathishtta ==
Punapathishta was performed by H. H. Shri Samyamindra Thirtha Swamiji by order of Guru Shri Sudhindra Thirtha Swamiji, the 20th Mathadipathi of Shri Kashi Math Samsthan and the spiritual head of Gaud Saraswath Brahmin community spread over the world. It is noteworthy that Samyamindra Swamiji, before Sanyasa Sweekar ceremony, was released from this temple who was surrendered in the lotus-feet of Sri Venu Gopala Krishna of Purakkad. The Puna-Prathishtta was a grand function since it was a blessing from Shri Sudhindra Thirtha Swamiji and first ceremony in Kerala after Deeksha Sweekar of Shri Samyamindra Thirtha Swamiji. Funds were pouring in from the devotees of G. S. B. world and their enthusiasm was so encouraging that Temple Renovation Committee astonished. The Devaswom managing Committee had already passed a resolution unanimously and presented in the meeting at T. D. School Kochi in A. D. 2000 to highlight that the G. S. B. Samaj and the temple of Purakkad will remain in the lotusfeet of Shri Sudhindra Thirtha Swamiji of Kashi Math Samsthan, the supreme spiritual head and soul of G. S. B. community. The G. S. B Samaj as a whole do Sashtaanga Pranaams in the lotusfeet of Gurudev and we pray to Vyasaraghupathi and Venu Gopal for long and healthy life to Gurudev to guide this community.

Puna-Prathishtta at Purakkad temple on 28 January 2011.

== Garbha Griha ==
The Garbhagriha or sanctum sanctorum is where the Main idol or Moola Vigraha is placed. The Garbha Griha in the temple is a ‘Bahu-vera Vidhana’ i.e. more than one idol is installed in the same Garbha Griha.

== Main festivals ==
- Karthik Pournami
- Navarathri
- Janmashtami

== See also ==
- Goud Saraswat Brahmin
- GSB Temples in Kerala
