= Sukrathindra Thirtha =

19th Mathadipathi of Kashi Math

- Title: 19th Mathadipathi of Kashi Math, Varanasi

Personal life
- Born: Srīnivāsa Prabhu; 26 March 1897 Cochin, Kerala, India
- Died: 10 July 1949 (aged 52) Cochin

Religious life
- Religion: Hinduism
- Order: Daśanāmī Saṃpradāya
- Philosophy: Dvaitavāda (Dualism)
- Sect: Madhva tradition of Vaiṣṇavism

Religious career
- Teacher: Svāmī Varadendra Tīrtha
- Disciples: Svāmī Sudhindra Tīrtha

Sukrathindra Thirta (26 March 1897 – 10 July 1949), also referred to as Shri Sukrathindra Thirtha Swamiji, was the legal and spiritual head (mathadipathi) of the Kashi Math and the nineteenth successive person called the swamiji of guru parampara. Born as Srinivasa Mallya, he was aligned towards spirituality since a young age since his family had close relations with CTD, Cochin. The seer was initiated into Sanyasa when he was a minor, which led to a lot of administrative difficulties.

== Kashi Math ==
Sukrathindra Thirtha was initiated into Sanyasa in the year 1912, in Tiruchirapalli, by Varadendra Thirtha, he took the charge of Kashi Math in 1914 after the samadhi of his guru, in Walkeshwar, Mumbai. His first task was to ensure that the finances of the Matha would be secure, which he did, post which he expanded the branches and renovated many existing ones. He also performed Chaturmasa Vritha across the country.

== Relations with the community ==
The seer had to ensure that the GSB community remained united, while also ensuring that the Cochin Thirumala Devaswom would be returned back to the community from the control of the then Kingdom of Cochin. He was known as a seer of few words but was appreciated for leading the GSB community through a period of turmoil that began when he took over as the head of the monastery in 1914, during the First World War, followed by the Second World War and finally culminating with the Independence of India.

He established a branch Matha at the pilgrim town of Rameshwaram. The seer believed in the policy of speaking less as he felt that the people would misinterpret his words, which would lead to conflicts. He performed the installations and reinstallations of the Pattabhi Ramachandra Temple at Koteshwar, Lakshmi Venkatesh Temple, Hosdurg, Kanhangad, and renovated the Kodanda Rama Temple at Rameshwaram. He carried out a lot of pilgrimages and also had a very cordial relation with the king of Kochi. He also shared cordial ties with the then Mathadipathi of the Gokarna Math.

As per the tradition of the math, to continue the guruparampara, on 24 May 1944, he initiated a vatu into sanyasa to be the 20th and called him Sudhindra Thirtha. This Vatu was initiated into Sanyasa in the Year 1944, at Mulky.

== Shishya Sweekar ==
Sukrathindra Thirtha appointed Sadashiva Senoy of Ernakulam as his Shishya and named him as Sudhindra Thirtha. The former had laid the condition that the next seer of the monastery should be well-versed in English. The Shishya sweekar took place at Mulky in the year 1944. Later in the Year 1944, the Shishya was sent to Bangalore to continue his religious studies.

During the period between 1944 and 1948, the senior seer tried his best to retrieve the Cochin Thirumala Devaswom back from the Government, which he succeeded in, making him an influential figure within the community. The seer later attained Vrindavan 10 July 1949 at Cochin Thirumala Devaswom Temple, Kochi.

== Later Life and Samadhi ==
The seer had an issue of diabetes and blood pressure. Unlike his predecessors, Varadendra Thirtha or Bhuvanendra Thirtha, who were great proponents of Ayurveda, he lacked the requisite knowledge for treating ailments. During the camp of the two seers in Thuravoor, the junior seer fell ill, the illness was later diagnosed as Malaria, this led to a lot of mental stress on the seer and his already fragile health didn't help his cause.

On the day of Ram Navami in the month of April 1949 the seers were camping in the Alleppey temple, when the senior seer's health started declining, the seer was then taken to Cochin for treatment, where doctors tried treating him, which didn't work. The seers continued to camp in the CTD, treatments continued on a regular basis, but on 10 July 1949, the seer died, the last rites were carried out in Kochi, and a Vrindavana was built, and 13 days later, his Shishya, Sudhindra Thirtha took over as the Mathadipathi of the Samsthan.
