= Sudhindra Tirtha (disambiguation) =

Sudhindra Tirtha can refer to:

- Sudhindra Tirtha (1596 - 1623) - a Dvaita philosopher of aesthetics, dramatist and the pontiff of the matha at Kumbakonam.
- Sudhindra Tirtha (Kashi Math) (1926 - 2016) - 20th Mathadhipathi of Kashi Math.
