= FACT Stadium =

Stadium in Eloor, India

Coordinates: 15°21′1″N 75°8′34″E

- Interactive map of FACT Stadium
- Full name: Fertilisers and Chemicals Travancore Stadium
- Former names: Fertilisers and Chemicals Travancore Ground
- Location: Eloor, Kochi, India
- Owner: Fertilisers and Chemicals Travancore
- Operator: Fertilisers and Chemicals Travancore
- Capacity: 5,000

Construction
- Groundbreaking: 1965
- Opened: 1965

Tenant
- Kerala Football Association

Website
- ESPNcricinfo

Fertilisers and Chemicals Travancore Ground or FACT Stadium is a multi purpose stadium in Eloor, Kochi in the state of Kerala. The ground is owned and managed by Fertilisers and Chemicals Travancore. The ground is mainly used for organizing matches of football, cricket and other sports. The stadium has hosted two Ranji Trophy match in 1965 when Kerala cricket team played against Andhra cricket team. The ground has one more Ranji Trophy matches again in 1965 when Kerala cricket team played against Hyderabad cricket team and against in 1992 but since then the stadium has hosted non-first-class matches.

== See also ==
- Fertilisers and Chemicals Travancore
- Eloor
