= Samyamindra Thirtha =

Indian guru

Srimad Samyamindra Thirtha Swami
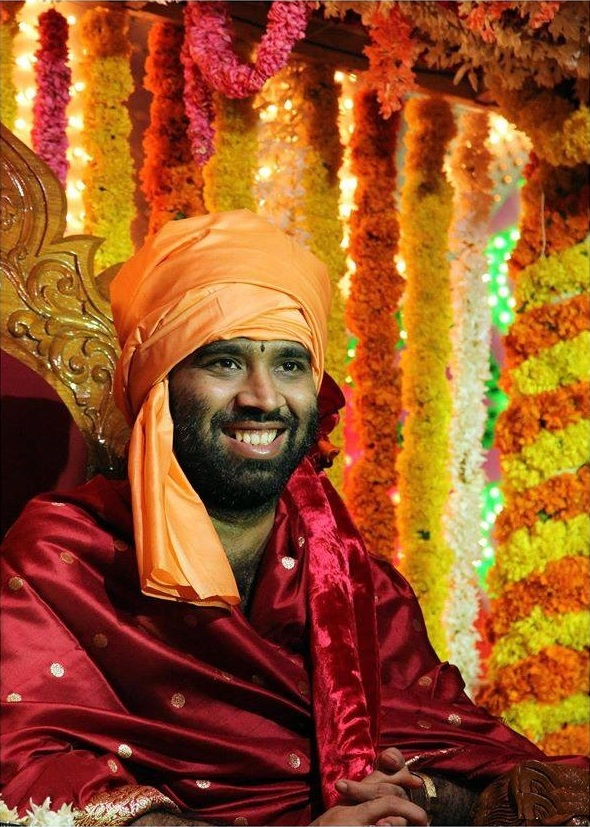
- Title: Mathadipathi

Personal life
- Born: Umesh Mallan; 12 September 1982 (age 43) North Paravur, Kerala, India
- Website: http://kashimath.org/

Religious life
- Religion: Hinduism
- Philosophy: Dvaita
- Sect: Kashi Math

Religious career
- Teacher: Sudhindra Thirtha

Shrimad Samyamindra Thirtha Swami (born 12 September 1982), also referred to as Shri Samyamindra Thirtha Swamiji, became the head (Mathadipathi) of the Kashi Math on 28 January 2016. He is the 21st successive person called the swamiji of guru parampara.

== Early life ==
He was born as Umesh Mallan on 12 September 1982 to Surendra Mallan, who was a technical officer with the Naval Physical and Oceanographic Laboratory at Kochi, and Nindila. He learned basic shastras from his grandfather Gopalakrishna Mallan. He was a 19-year old second year BCom student when he decided on pursuing sanyasa and submitted his horoscope details to Thirumala Devaswom for the position of patta shishya of Kashi Math without seeking the permission of his parents.

== Shishya Sweekar ==
His horoscope had the characteristics (viz. sanyasa yoga and uthama raja yoga) to become a pontiff. This helped Shri Sudhindra Thirtha Swamiji to select him out of 48 horoscopes. Shri Sudhindra Thirtha Swamiji, then Mathadhipati of Shree Kashi Math Samsthan initiated him into Sanyas on the banks of the Holy River Ganga at Haridwar on Jyeshta Shuddha Dashami, 20 June 2002 and was named Shrimath Samyamindra Thirtha Swamiji. The proclamation was put into effect by Shri Sudhindra Thirtha Swamiji on the day of Vyasa Jayanthi (Guru Poornima).

== Ritual education ==
The Sudha Mangalotsava of Samyamindra Tirtha was celebrated at Bangalore Shri Kashi Math Samsthan on Madhwa Navami day on 24 January 2010. The ceremony marks the end of a period of training in the tenets of the organisation.

== Head of Kashi Math ==
Shrimath Sudhindra Thirtha Swamiji, the predecessor of Shrimath Samyamindra Thirtha Swamiji as mathadipathi, attained moksha on 17 January 2016. In accordance with the guru–shishya tradition followed by the math, he had previously initiated Samyamindra as the shishya who would succeed him upon his death and thus Samyamindra became the new mathadipathi. He officially took charge on 28 January 2016 at Vyasashram, Haridwar.

== Mokkam and Thrikala Pooja ==
The principal deities of Kashi Math are charaprathishta (“moving installation") idols of Vyasa, Rama and Narasimha, who are also collectively known as the Vyasa Raghupathi Narasimha. Samyamindra Thirtha will be travelling to various cities in India and camping which is called as Mokkam at Temples/Branch Maths. They also offer the daily pujas which is called as Thrikala Pooja. The usual camp duration at each city ranges from 2 days to 10 days except for Chathurmasya Vrutha and Vasanthothsava. During Chathurmasya Vrutha, they will be camping at a single city or place for 4 months and during Vasanthothsava, it will be 45 days.

== List of Chathurmasya Vruthas observed ==
The following are the Chathurmasya Vruthas which are observed by Shri Samyamindra Thirtha Swamiji.

Number	Samvatsara Name	English Year	Place	Temple/Math
1	Chitrabhānu	2002	Haridwar	Sri Vyas Ashram, Shree Kashi Math, Haridwar
2	Subhānu	2003	Mumbai	Walkeshwar Shree Kashi Math, Mumbai
3	Tāraṇa	2004	Ambalamedu	Ambalamedu Shree Kashi Math, Ambalamedu, Ernakulam
4	Pārthiva	2005	Ambalamedu	Ambalamedu Shree Kashi Math, Ambalamedu, Ernakulam
5	Vyaya	2006	Ambalamedu	Ambalamedu Shree Kashi Math, Ambalamedu, Ernakulam
6	Sarvajit	2007	Bangalore	Bangalore Shree Kashi Math, Bangalore
7	Sarvadhārin	2008	Bangalore	Bangalore Shree Kashi Math, Bangalore
8	Virodhin	2009	Bangalore	Bangalore Shree Kashi Math, Bangalore
9	Vikṛti	2010	Haridwar	Sri Vyas Ashram, Shree Kashi Math, Haridwar
10	Khara	2011	Hemmady	Hemmady Shree Kashi Math, Hemmady
11	Nandana	2012	Haridwar	Sri Vyas Ashram, Shree Kashi Math, Haridwar
12	Vijaya	2013	Bangalore	Bangalore Shree Kashi Math, Bangalore
13	Jaya	2014	Mumbai	Walkeshwar Shree Kashi Math, Mumbai
14	Manmatha	2015	Koteshwara	Pattabhi Ramachandra Temple, Koteshwar
15	Durmukha	2016	Kanhangad	Sri Lakshmi Venkatesh Temple, Hosdurg, Kanhangad
16	Hevilambi	2017	Konchadi	Konchadi Shree Kashi Math, Mangalore
17	Vilambi	2018	Tirumala	Tirumala Shree Kashi Math, Tirumala
18	Vikari	2019	Kota	Kota Shree Kashi Math, Kota, Karnataka
19	Sarvari	2020	Konchadi	Konchadi Shree Kashi Math, Mangalore
20	Plavanama	2021	Kochi	Gosripuram, Cochin Thirumala Devaswam, Kochi
21	Shubhakritu	2022	Mangalore	Sri Venkataramana Temple, Car Street, Mangalore
22	Śobhakṛta	2023	Bangalore	Bangalore Shree Kashi Math, Bangalore
23	Krodhi	2024	Mumbai	Walkeshwar Shree Kashi Math, Mumbai
24	Viśvāvasu	2025	Koteshwara	Pattabhi Ramachandra Temple, Koteshwar
25	Parābhava	2026	Varanasi	Varanasi Shree Kashi Math, Moola Math, Varanasi
26	Plavaṅga	2027	Konchadi	Konchadi Shree Kashi Math, Mangalore

== List of Vasanthothsava observed ==
The following are the list of Vasanthothsava which are observed by Shri Samyamindra Thirtha Swamiji.

Number	Samvatsara Name	English Year	Place	Temple/Math
1	Jaya	2014	Kasargod	Sree Varadaraja Venkatramana Temple, Kasargod
2	Manmatha	2015	Haridwar	Sri Vyas Ashram, Shree Kashi Math, Haridwar
3	Durmukha	2016	Karkala	Shree Venkataramana Temple, Karkala
4	Hevilambi	2017	Kochi	Gosripuram, Cochin Thirumala Devaswam, Kochi
5	Vilambi	2018	Chempi	Shree Lakshmi Venkataramana Temple, Chempi, Udupi
6	Vikari	2019	Bhagamandala	Bhagamandala Shree Kashi Math, Bhagamandala
7	Sarvari	2020	Basrur	Basrur Shree Kashi Math, Basrur
8	Plavanama	2021	Haridwar	Sri Vyas Ashram, Shree Kashi Math, Haridwar
9	Shubhakritu	2022	Navi Mumbai	Shree Laxmi Venkatramana Temple, Shri Balaji Mandir, Vashi, Navi Mumbai
10	Śobhakṛta	2023	Belthangady	Sri Venkataramana Temple, Laila, Belthangady
11	Krodhi	2024	Ernakulam	Punjabjapuram, Ernakulam Thirumala Devaswam, Ernakulam
12	Viśvāvasu	2025	Haridwar	Sri Vyas Ashram, Shree Kashi Math, Haridwar
13	Parābhava	2026	Bangalore	Shree Venkataramana Devasthana, Shree Ananthanagar, Electronic City, Bengaluru
14	Plavaṅga	2027	Kundapura	Pete Shri Venkataramana Temple, Kundapura
15	Kīlaka	2028	Shirali	Shri Mahaganapati Mahamaya Temple, Shirali
