= Purakkad =

- Village
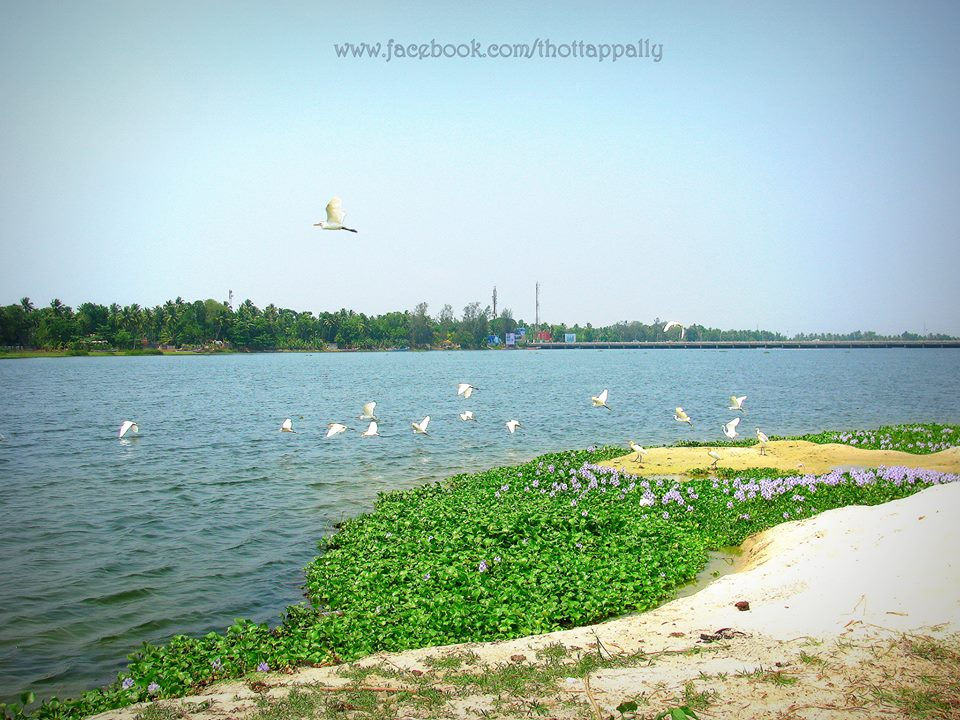
- Thottappally Backwaters situated in Purakkad Grama Panchayat

- Location within Kerala
- Coordinates: 9°21′13.784″N 76°21′58.921″E
- Country: India
- State: Kerala
- District: Alappuzha

Population (2011)
  - Total: 29,782

Languages
  - Official: Malayalam, English
- Time zone: UTC+5:30 (IST)
- Postal code: 688561
- Vehicle registration: KL-04

Purakkad is a coastal village in Alappuzha district in the Indian state of Kerala.

The literal meaning of Purakkad is "out of forest".

The Battle of Purakkad took place in 1746 between Travancore and combined forces of Odanad.

It is the site of the Sree Venu Gopala Swamy temple.

== Demographics ==
As of 2011 India census, Purakkad has a population of 29782 with 14383 males and 15399 females. Male literacy rate is 96.94% and the female literacy rate is 93.65%.

== Elections ==
=== Panchayat election 2025 ===
Total seats	UDF	LDF	NDA	OTH
19	9	6	3	1
Change	▲4	▼5	▲2	=

Ward Number	Ward Name	Winning candidate	Party	Alliance
1.	Payalkulangara	Gopakumar N. D.	INC	UDF
2.	Karoor North	Sunitha U.	BJP	NDA
3.	Karoor East	B. Sreekumar	CPI(M)	LDF
4.	Karoor	V. S. Mayadevi	CPI(M)	LDF
5.	Pazhayangadi	Susheela Pradeep	CPI(M)	LDF
6.	Thaichira	Sumesh Rajan	INC	UDF
7.	Naluchira	Sindhu Baby	INC	UDF
8.	Thottappally	A. Sunilkumar	INC	UDF
9.	Thottappally West	M. H. Vijayan	INC	UDF
10.	Harbour	Arya Noju	BJP	NDA
11.	Spilway East	R. Raji (Unni)	CPI(M)	LDF
12.	Chennankara	Lakshmi Raj	INC	UDF
13.	Purakkad West	Soumi Fasil	SDPI	N/A
14.	Anandeswaram	Shylamma Shaji	CPI	LDF
15.	Punthala	Sasikumar	CPI(M)	LDF
16.	Puthan Nada	Beena	INC	UDF
17.	Purakkad	Rahumath Hamid	INC	UDF
18.	Panchayat Office	Sulekha Babu	INC	UDF
19.	New LPS Ward	Jayasree Mohandas	BJP	NDA

=== Panchayat election 2020 ===
Total seats	LDF	UDF	NDA	OTH
18	11	5	1	1
Change	▲3	▼3	▼1	▲1

Ward Number	Ward Name	Winning candidate	Party	Alliance
1.	Payalkulangara	M. Sreedevi	Independent	LDF
2.	Karoor North	R. Rajeevan	CPI(M)	LDF
3.	Karoor East	Rahul	CPI(M)	LDF
4.	Karoor	V. S. Mayadevi	CPI(M)	LDF
5.	Pazhayangadi	V. S. Jinuraj	CPI(M)	LDF
6.	Thaichira	Bindumol U.	CPI(M)	LDF
7.	Naluchira	Priya Ajesh	CPI(M)	LDF
8.	Thottappally	R. Suni	CPI(M)	LDF
9.	Thottappally West	Prasanna Kunjumon	INC	UDF
10.	Harbour	Rajeshwari Krishnan	INC	UDF
11.	Spilway East	Leena Rajaneesh	CPI(M)	LDF
12.	Chennankara	C. Raju	BJP	NDA
13.	Anandeswaram	V. Sasikanthan	INC	UDF
14.	Punthala	Ammini Vijayan	INC	UDF
15.	Puthan Nada	G. Subhashkumar	INC	UDF
16.	Panchayat Office	D. Manoj	Independent	LDF
17.	Purakkad	Fasil	SDPI	N/A
18.	Pazhayapurakkad	A. S. Sudarshanan	Independent	LDF

=== Panchayat election 2015 ===
Total seats	UDF	LDF	NDA	OTH
18	8	8	2	0

Ward Number	Ward Name	Winning candidate	Party	Alliance
1.	Payalkulangara	Prasad	INC	UDF
2.	Karoor North	B. Priya	CPI(M)	LDF
3.	Karoor East	Jayasree Chandu	CPI(M)	LDF
4.	Karoor	Saji Matheri	INC	UDF
5.	Pazhayangadi	Prabha Ravi	CPI(M)	LDF
6.	Thaichira	V. S. Jinuraj	CPI(M)	LDF
7.	Naluchira	Prabalendran	CPI(M)	LDF
8.	Thottappally	R. Suni	CPI(M)	LDF
9.	Thottappally West	P. P. Niji	INC	UDF
10.	Harbour	P. Aromal	BJP	NDA
11.	Spilway East	R. Raji (Unni)	CPI(M)	LDF
12.	Chennankara	Liji Devadath	INC	UDF
13.	Anandeswaram	J. Sudhamani	CPI	LDF
14.	Punthala	V. Sasikanthan	INC	UDF
15.	Puthan Nada	Suja Thankakuttan	INC	UDF
16.	Panchayat Office	Rahmath Hamid	INC	UDF
17.	Purakkad	Sulekha Babu	INC	UDF
18.	Pazhayapurakkad	Bindu Shaji	BJP	NDA
