= Eloor =

- Municipality
- Location in Kerala, India Eloor (India)
- Coordinates: 10°4′0″N 76°18′0″E
- Country: India
- State: Kerala
- District: Ernakulam

Government
  - Body: Municipality
  - Chairperson: Laiji Sajeevan
  - Vice Chairperson: Leela Babu

Area
  - Total: 14.21 km^{2} (5.49 sq mi)

Population (2011)
  - Total: 31,468
  - Density: 2,214/km^{2} (5,736/sq mi)

Languages
  - Official: Malayalam, English
- Time zone: UTC+5:30 (IST)
- Postal code: 683501
- Telephone code: 0484
- Vehicle registration: KL-41
- Nearest city: Aluva, North Paravoor, Edappaly
- Lok Sabha constituency: Ernakulam
- Civic agency: Municipality
- Climate: Tropical monsoon (Köppen)
- Avg. summer temperature: 35 °C (95 °F)
- Avg. winter temperature: 20 °C (68 °F)
- Website: eloormunicipality.lsgkerala.gov.in/en

Eloor is a suburb of Kochi and a municipality in Paravur Taluk, Ernakulam District in the Indian state of Kerala, India. It is an industrial area situated around 13 kilometres (8.1 miles) north of the city centre. It is an island of 14.21 km^{2} formed between two distributaries of river Periyar and is the largest industrial belt in Kerala. The neighbouring places of Eloor are Kalamassery industrial hub, Aluva, Cheranalloor and Paravur.

== History ==
Eloor Moopans were the traditional landlords in this area. Many revolts have occurred in Kottakkunnu, Eloor regarding land reformation. Kerala's first private hospital, St. Josephs Hospital opened in Eloor in the year 1886. Manjummel Sree Krishna Swamy temple is an ancient temple

== Economy ==
There are various companies of different kinds along the industrial belt including Fertilisers and Chemicals Travancore (FACT), Indian Rare Earths Limited, Hindustan Insecticides Limited and many others manufacturing a range of products like chemical-petrochemical products, rare-earth elements, rubber-processing chemicals, fertilizers, zinc/chromium compounds and leather products.

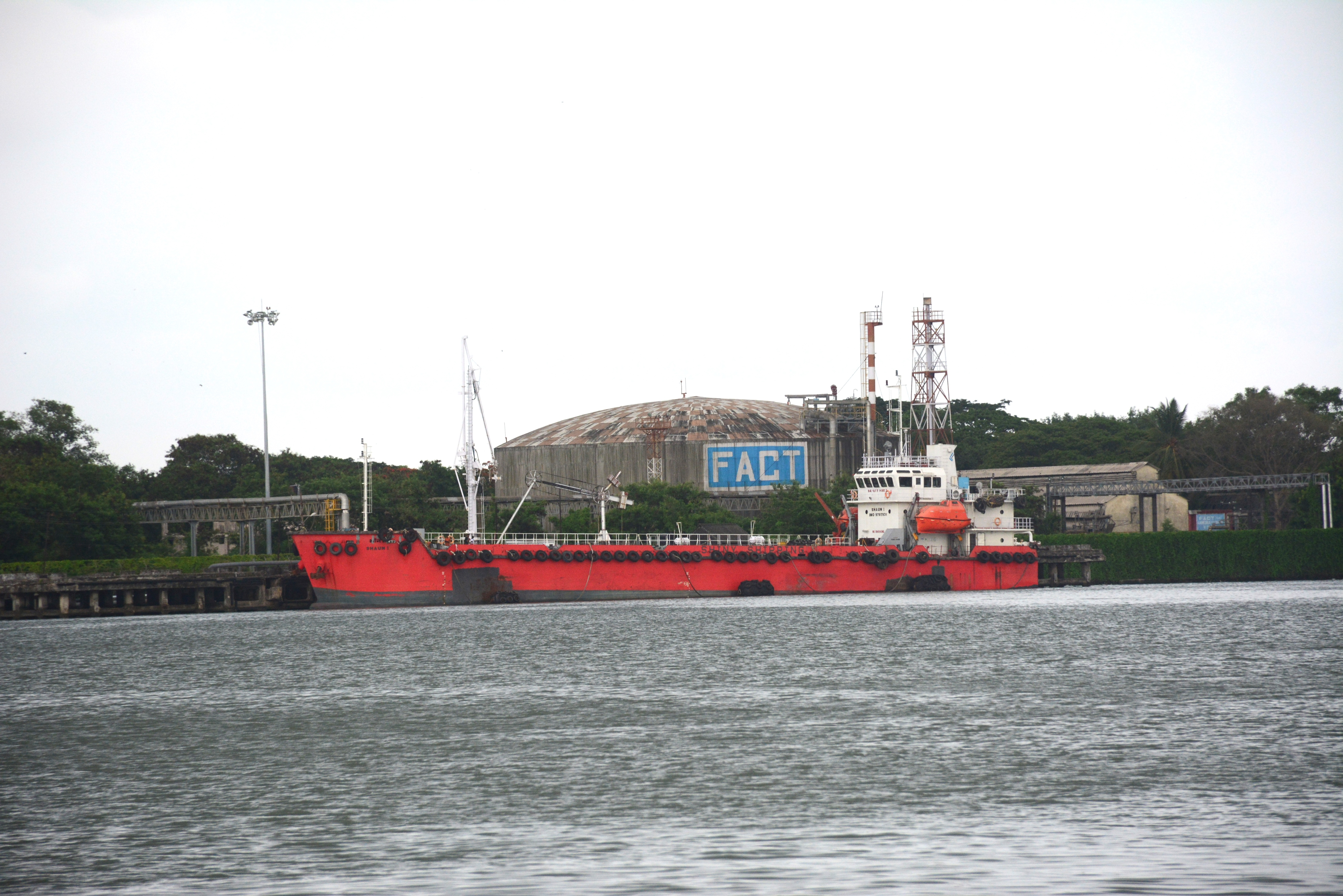
FACT Cochin Division

== Demographics ==
As of 2001 India census, Eloor had a population of 30,092. 11% of the population is under 6 years of age. Males constitute 50% of the population and females 50%. Eloor has an average literacy rate of 84%, somewhat higher than the national average of 59.5%: male literacy is 86%, and female literacy is 81%.

== Education ==
Educational institutions in the area include .S.H.J.U.P.School Eloor North

- FACT Public School, Eloor.
- St. Ann's Higher Secondary School Eloor
- FACT Udyogmandal School By KASTHURBA
- Guardian Angels Public School, Manjummel
- FACT Eastern UP School By KASTHURBA
- Govt. L.P. School, Eloor South,
- Govt. U.P School, Kuttikattukara
- Kasthurba English Medium School, Manjummel
- Crescent Kinter Garden, Eloor North
- ELOOR (Pathalam) Govt. Higher Secondary School
- Central Institute Of Plastic Engineering And Technology

== Hospitals ==
- ESI Hospital, Pathalam
- St. Joseph's Hospital, Manjummel
- Primary Health Center Eloor Depot

== Religious sites ==
- Eloor east muhyadheen juma masjid thekkepuram (puthalam masjid)
- Pattupurakkal Devi Temple
- Balasubramanya Temple, Eloor Depot
- Sree Subramanya Temple, Sree Kumara Vilasam Sabha, SN Nagar, Manjummel
- SNDP Branch, 1071, SN Nagar, Manjummel
- SN Samoohya Seva Sangam, SN Nagar, Manjummel
- Sree Krishna Swami Temple, Manjummel
- Naranath Sree Krishna Swami Temple
- Kuttakav Bhagavathy Temple
- Our Lady of Immaculate Conception Church, Manjummel
- Elanjickal Bhagavathy Kshetram
- Elanjickal Mahadeva Kshetram
- Elanjickal Nagaraja Kshetram
- FACT Central Juma Masjid, Fact Jn.
- Eloor Juma Masjid
- Najathul Islam Masjid, Eloor North
- Vayalvaramkavu Bhagavathy Temple Eloor Methanam
- St. Antony's Church, Eloor Ferry road
- St. Joseph's Church, Eloor Ferry
- Christ the king Church, Eloor Depot
- St Thomas Church, Kuttikkatukara
- St. Jude's Church, Pathalam
- St. Ann's Church, Eloor
- Noorul Huda Masjid Eloor Deopot
- Sree Bhuvaneshwari Temple, Manjummel, Eloor
- Sree Krishna Vilasam N.S.S Karayogam, Manjummel

== Notable people ==
- Beena Antony
- Rafi Mecartin, Film director
- Nadirshah
- Pattanam Rasheed

== Sports ==
FACT Stadium is located here.

== See also ==
- Paravur Taluk
- Ernakulam District
