= Ambalamedu =

- town
- Interactive map of Ambalamedu
- Coordinates: 9°58′N 76°23′E
- Country: India
- State: Kerala
- District: Ernakulam

Languages
  - Official: Malayalam, English
- Time zone: UTC+5:30 (IST)
- Vehicle registration: KL-

Ambalamedu is a suburb of the city of Kochi in Kerala, India. Ambalamedu is located near the border of the former states of Travancore and Cochin and lies on a lake.

== History ==
Ambalamedu is now associated with the Cochin Division of the Fertilisers and Chemicals Travancore Ltd. (FACT), a public enterprise. FACT, then under its illustrious chairman and managing director, M.K.K. Nair, acquired about 1500 acres (6 km^{2}) of land in the mid-1960s for the construction of an ammonia and urea manufacturing plants. Construction of the factory and the township commenced in 1966 under the able supervision of Chief Engineer, Ranganathan. The native population that held agricultural land in the area were rehabilitated outside the township.

To meet the high demand of water in manufacturing fertilizer, over 250 acres (1 km^{2}) of Paddy fields were converted into a lake by constructing an earthen dam and water brought in through a canal from Bhoothathankettu dam, near Kothamangalam. At the centre of the lake is an island on which the Ambalamedu House is situated. An exquisite building complex that blends modern architecture with the traditional Kerala style, it served as the division's main guest house.

Along the shores of the lake are houses built using traditional Kerala architecture. The township was planned to integrate surrounding natural features, retaining existing trees and plant species. It includes facilities such as schools, parks, stores, and a hospital. Ambalamedu flourished from the 1960s through the 1990s.

Unfortunately, with the public sector company in financial trouble due to the liberalization of the markets and consequent loss of government subsidies for fertilizer manufacture while under a regulated price regime, Ambalamedu township fell into bad times. Wanton pollution from the nearby factories such as Carbon black near Karimugal turned it into an undesirable place to live. FACT employees slowly abandoned the township and today many of the houses remain empty and in a very poor state of repair.

== Landmarks ==
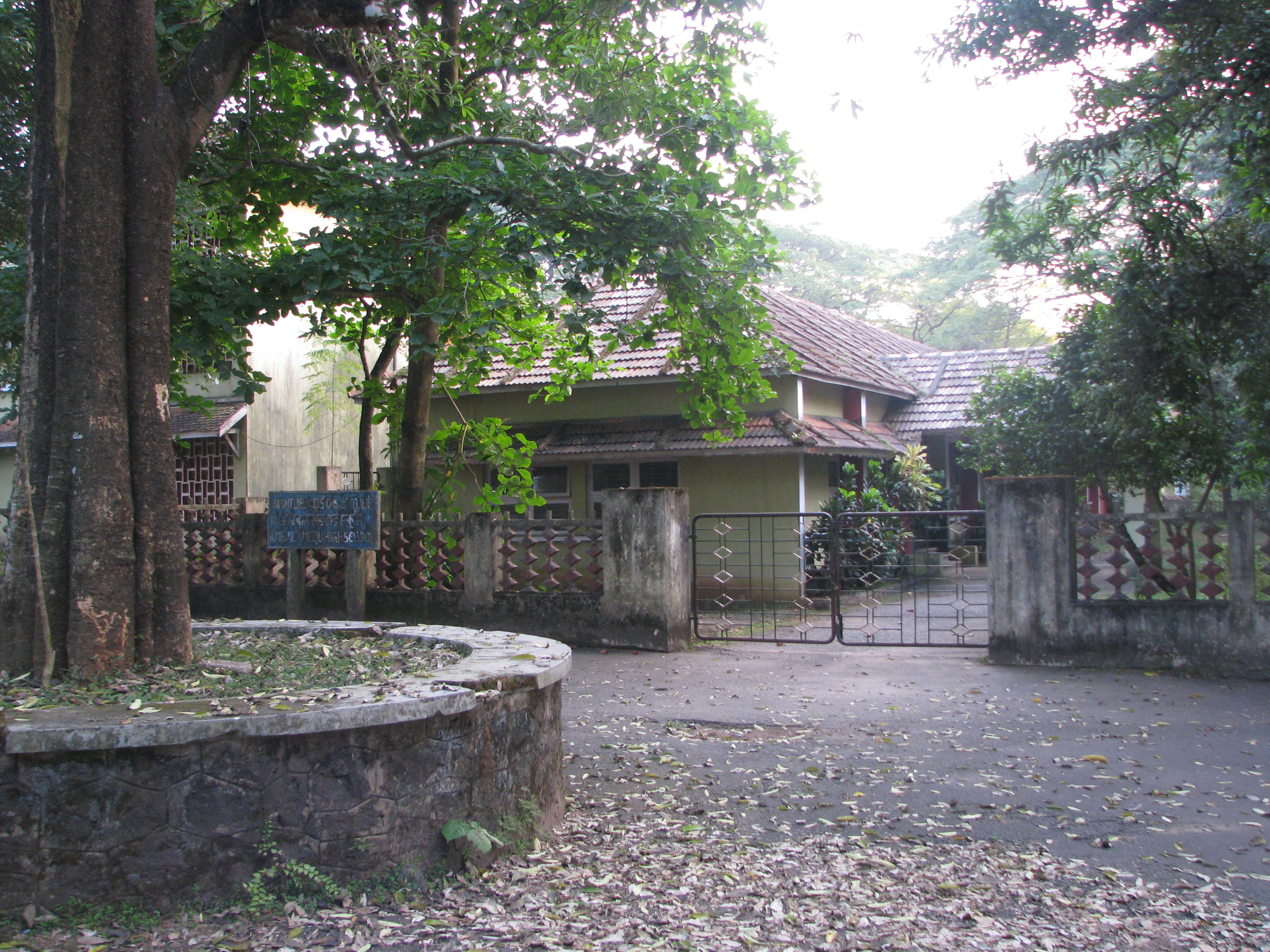
F.A.C.T. High School, Ambalamedu

- Ambalamedu High School

== Temples ==
Harimattom temple is the well-known in ambalamedu. "Shankara Narayana" sangamam is the speciality of this temple. "Harimattom Pooram" is the celebration in here. Various cultural and traditional activities can be arranged in here. "Ambalamedu kalakshettra" is one of the part of this temple. It should have a traditional background. Various persons presented various traditional programs. "Ambalamedu Kalakshettra" is the heart beat of Ambalamedu.

== Location ==
Ambalamedu is around 8 kilometers from Tripunithura on the way from Thripunithura to Aluva via Karimugal. The distance from Aluva to Ambalamedu is 20 kilometers.
