= Our Lady of Immaculate Conception Church, Manjummel =

Catholic parish in India

Our Lady of Immaculate Conception Church
- Our Lady of Immaculate Conception Church
- 10°03′35″N 76°18′17″E
- Location: Manjummel, Ernakulam district, Kerala
- Country: India
- Denomination: Catholic Church
- Sui iuris church: Latin Church
- Website: www.manjummelchurch.org

History
- Status: Church
- Founder: Leonardo Mellano
- Dedication: Mother Mary
- Dedicated: 4 December 1892
- Consecrated: 18 April 1893

Architecture
- Functional status: Active
- Architectural type: Portuguese
- Groundbreaking: 29 September 1876
- Completed: 4 December 1892

Administration
- District: Ernakulam
- Province: St. Pius X Manjummel Province of Discalced Carmelites
- Diocese: Archdiocese of Verapoly
- Parish: Our Lady of Immaculate Conception Church

Clergy
- Archbishop: Joseph Kalathiparambil
- Vicar: Rev. Fr. Steejan Kanakkassery OCD

Our Lady of Immaculate Conception Church, popularly known as Manjummel Palli, is a Catholic parish church coming under the Archdiocese of Verapoly. It is situated along the Eloor - Muttar Road, about 8 km from Kalamassery at Manjummel, in Kochi, Kerala. It was blessed on 4 December 1892 and is one of the century-old churches in Kerala.

== Overview ==
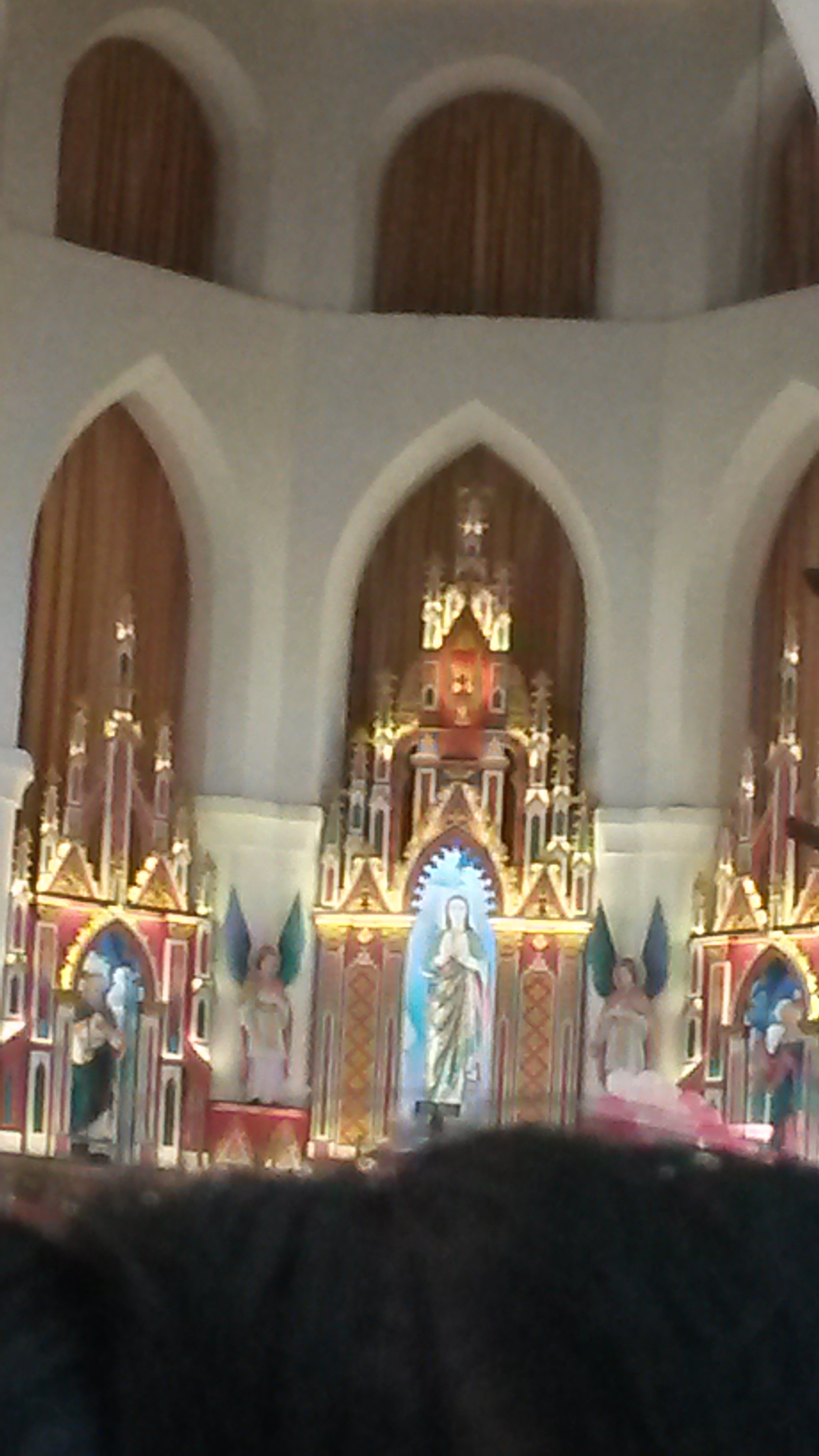
Church Altar

St. Pius X Manjummel Province of Discalced Carmelites, though started in 1857 in the coastal village of Koonammavu, had a short life. After the province became extinct, an offshoot was formed at Manjummel after 17 years in the form of a monastery dedicated to Our Lady of the Immaculate Conception which was inaugurated on 16 April 1874 by Leonardo Mellano, the then Archbishop of Verapoly. This was the first indigenous religious congregation in the state. Two years later, the foundation stone for a new church dedicated to Mother Mary was laid and the construction of the church was completed in over a decade with the blessing ceremony taking place on 4 December 1892. A few months later, the church was consecrated on 18 April 1893 and the church became a parish in 1911. It is the parent parish of three other smaller nearby parishes such as Fathima Matha Church, Muttar, St. Joseph's Church, Eloor and St. Sebastian's Shrine, Eloor. The annual festival of Virgin Mary is celebrated on 8 December. There are daily morning Mass at 6:00 AM and evening mass on Tuesdays and Fridays.

The church is associated with a number of Catholic missionaries such as Pedro Landetta Azcueta (Aurelian), Eliswa and Zacharias Salterain Viscarra, whose names are in different stages of canonization by the Roman Catholic Church. The Church has declared Eliswa as a Servant of God, Aurelian as Blessed and Zacharias as Venerable. Though originally buried at St. Joseph Pontifical Seminary, Mangalapuzha, the mortal remains of Aurelian and Zacharias were later transferred to this church and the church hall houses their tombs.

The church has an additional chapel, Karunya Koodaram, built in December 2015 which is a modern building of smaller dimensions. Adjoining the chapel is the Grotto of Mother Mary, originally built and blessed on 11 February 1959 by Valerian Gracias, the first Indian to become a cardinal of the Roman Catholic Church. It was subsequently renovated in 2016. The church also operates a printing press, Little Flower Press, established in 1927, which publishes Cherupushpam, a cultural magazine, among other publications.

== Carmelite Educational Trust ==
Carmelite Educational Trust is the division which manages the educational activities of the church. The trust manages three institutions, Lisieux Elementary School, Guardian Angels Upper Primary School and Guardian Angels Higher Secondary Public School. The educational activities started as a primary school but grew to become a higher secondary school in 2002 and is a CBSE accredited institution since 2012. The elementary school has a theme park named Lisieux Wonderla, attached to it.

== Monastery of the Immaculate Conception ==
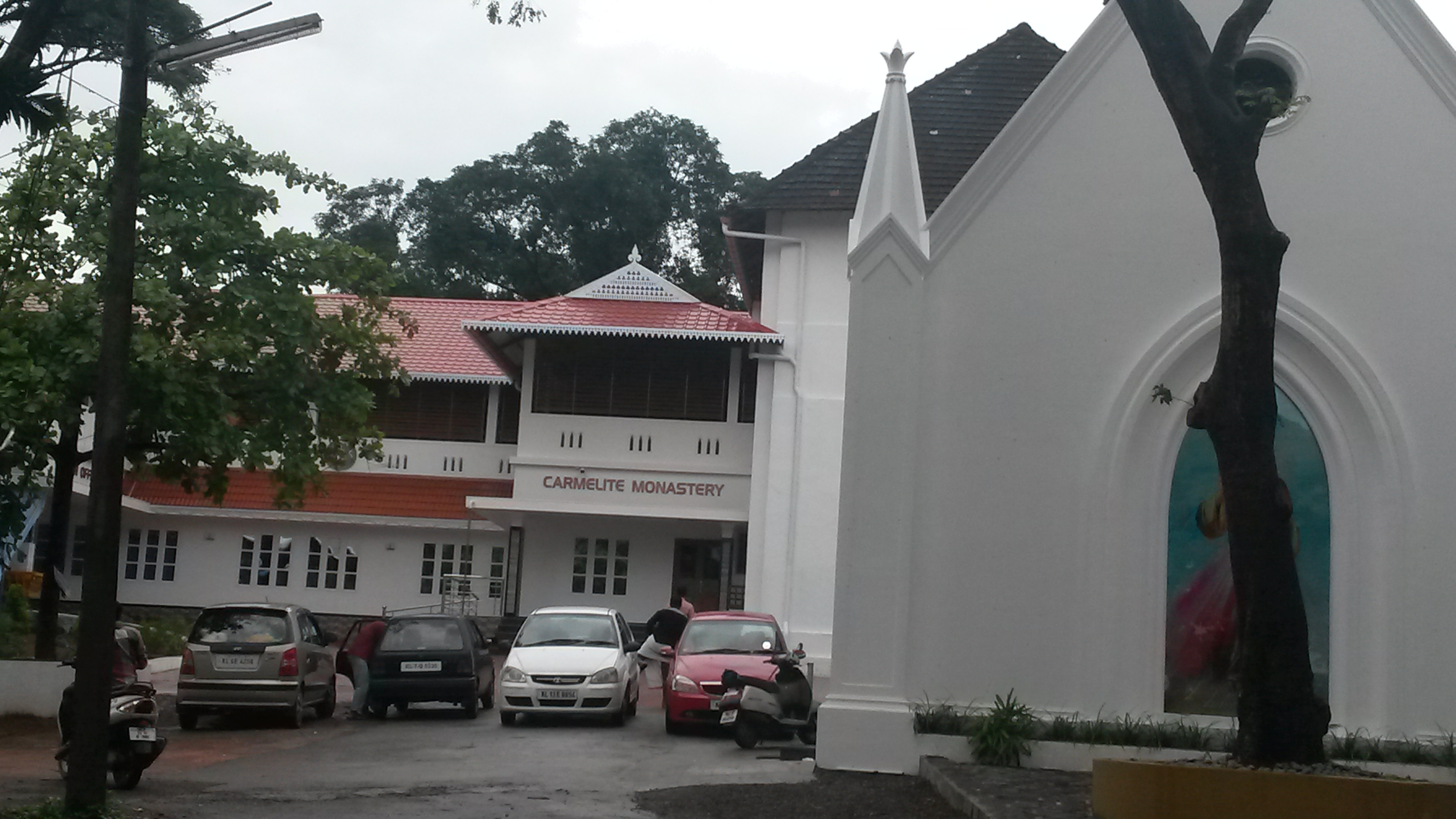
Carmelite Monastery

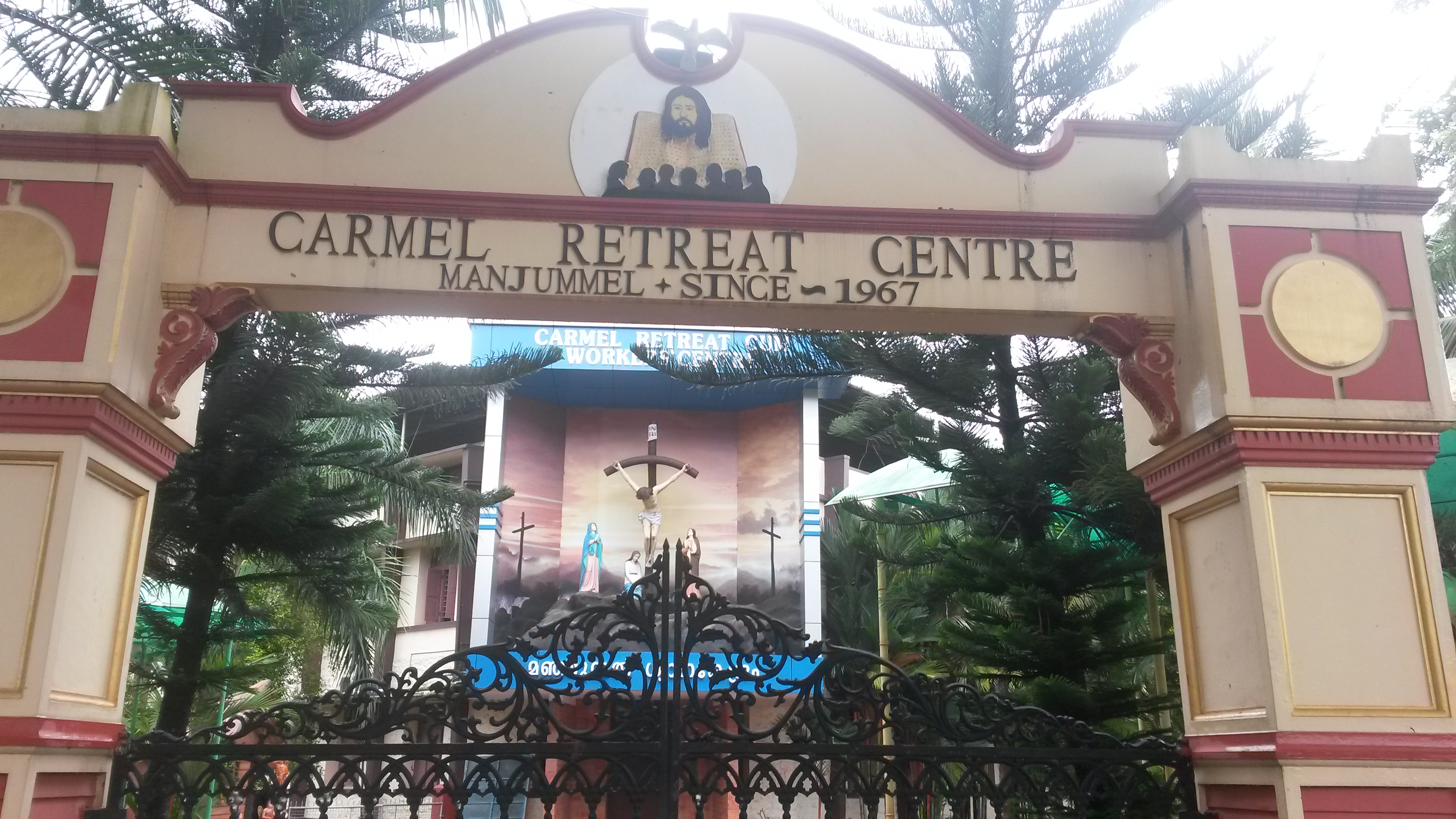
Carmel Retreat Centre

The Carmelite Monastery was founded by the Order of Discalced Carmelites in 1874, aligned to the congregation of Carmelites. It is situated in the church premises, adjoining the parish house. The monastery is home to 9 tertiary Carmelite priests, 9 lay brothers and several novices while the province has a strength of 214 priests and 109 Seminarians. It also manages a retreat centre, Carmel Retreat Centre, which is a residential apostolate in nature.

== St. Joseph's Hospital ==
The first Mission hospital in kerala and the second mission hospital in India, hospital was started in 1887 as a small dispensary by Nicholas Verhoven, a brother at the Carmelite Monastery in Koonammavu. The institution, over the years, grew to become the present-day St. Joseph’s Hospital, with inpatient service having 160 beds, critical care units and other modern facilities, including alternative medicine therapies.

== Location ==
The location of the church is in Manjummel, a satellite town of the industrial area of Eloor. The town sits on the banks of River Periyar, and the distance from the town of Kalamassery is around 8 km. Two National Highways pass near the town; National Highway 47 through Kalamassery and National Highway 17 towards west near Muttar. The church is situated along the Eloor-Muttar Road and is accessible through rail via Edappally railway station which is around 2 km away. The nearest airport is Kochi International Airport, approximately 22 km from the church.

== See also ==
- Roman Catholic Archdiocese of Verapoly
- St.Philomena's Forane Church, Koonammavu

== Image gallery ==
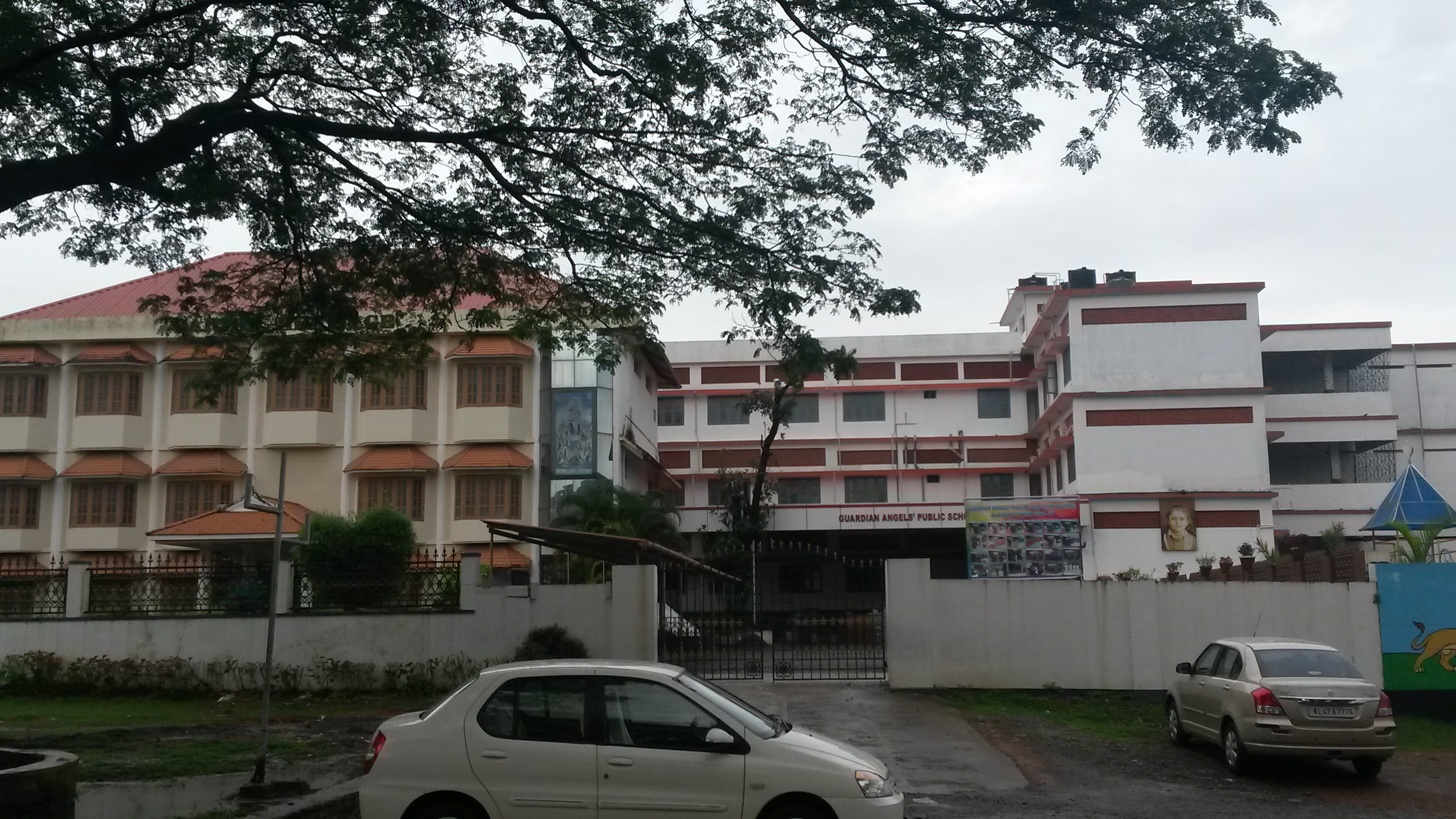
Guardian Angels Public School

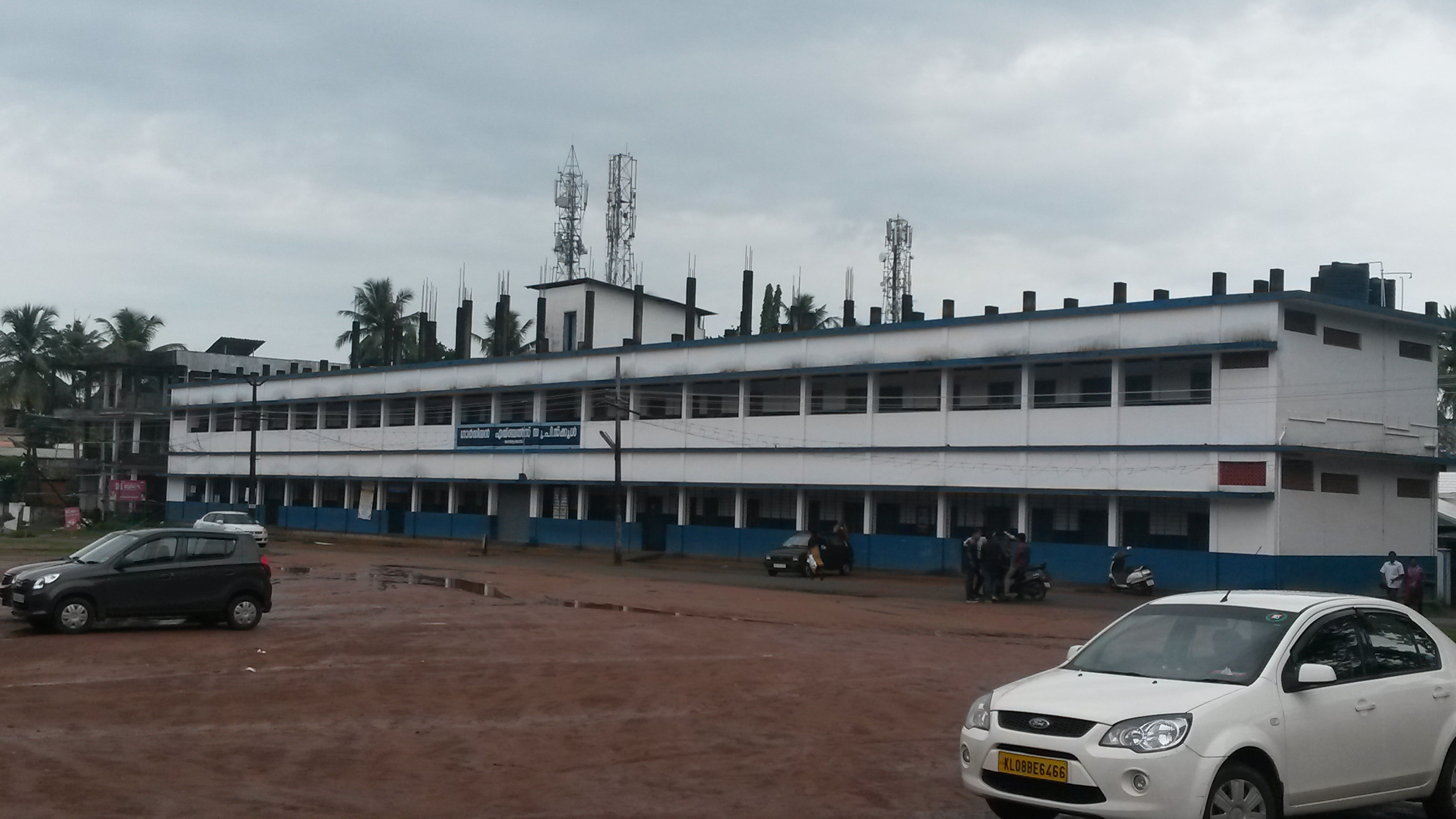
Guardian Angels U. P. School

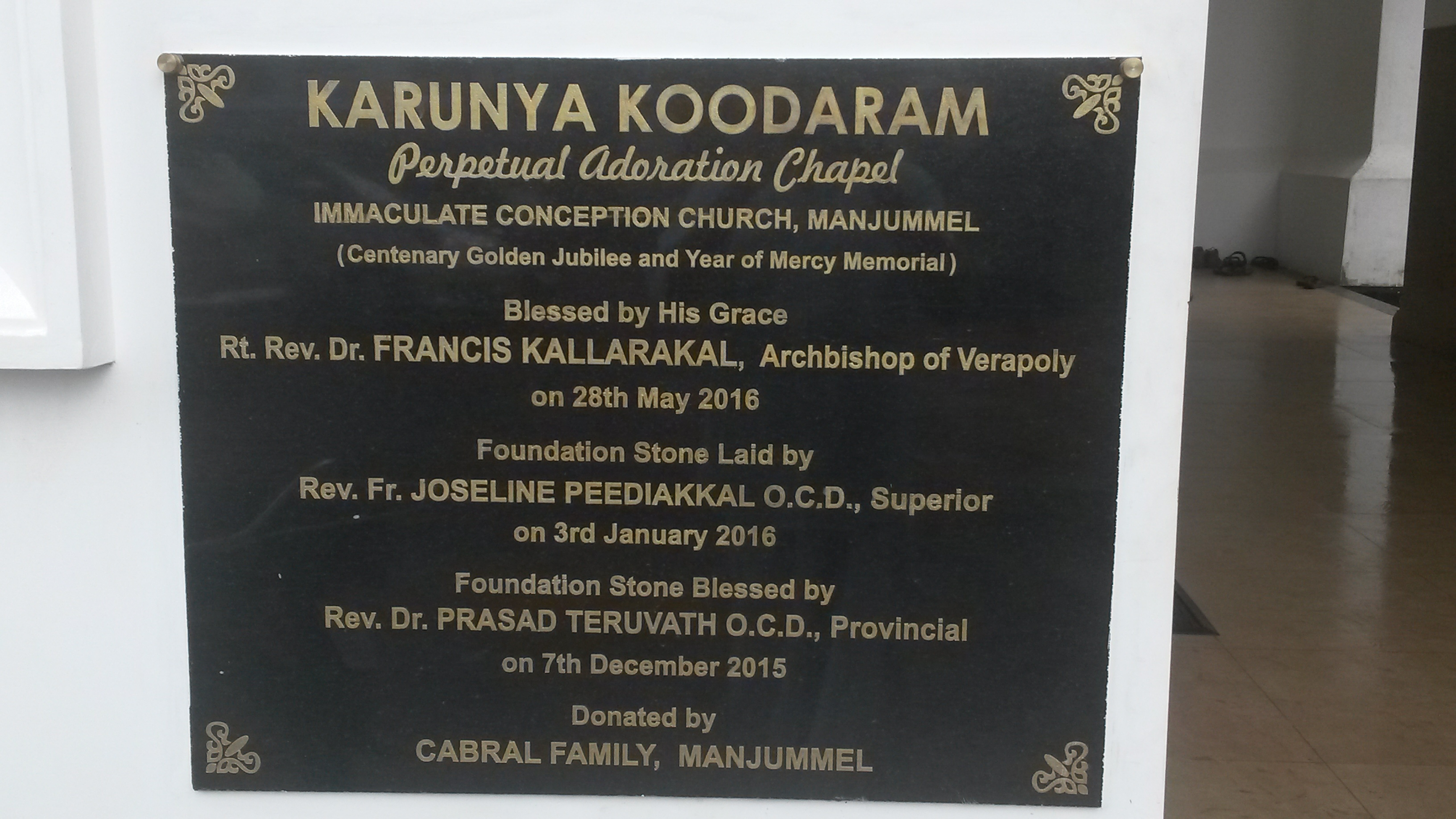
Karunya Koodaram foundation stone

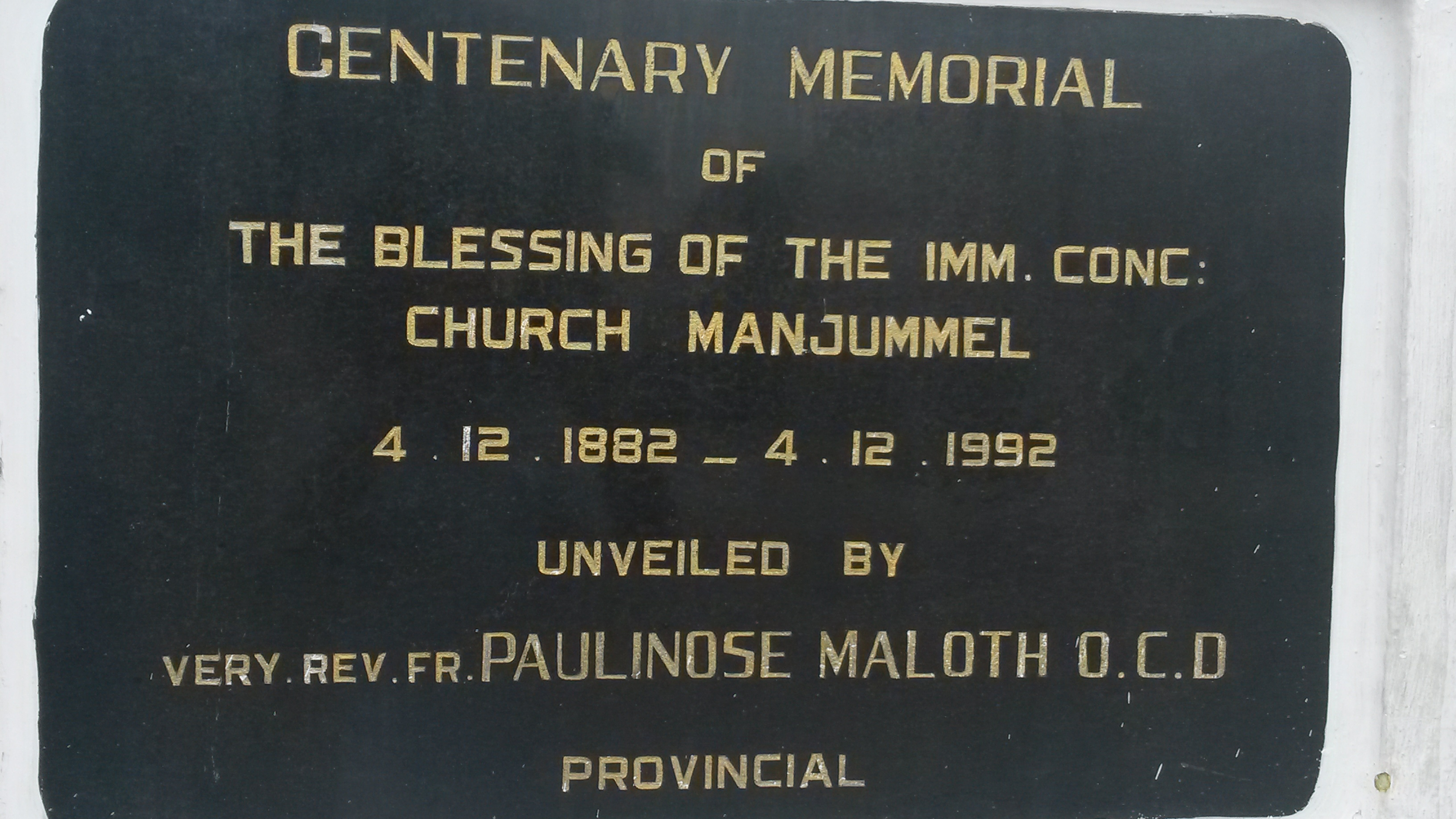
Manjummel Church foundation stone

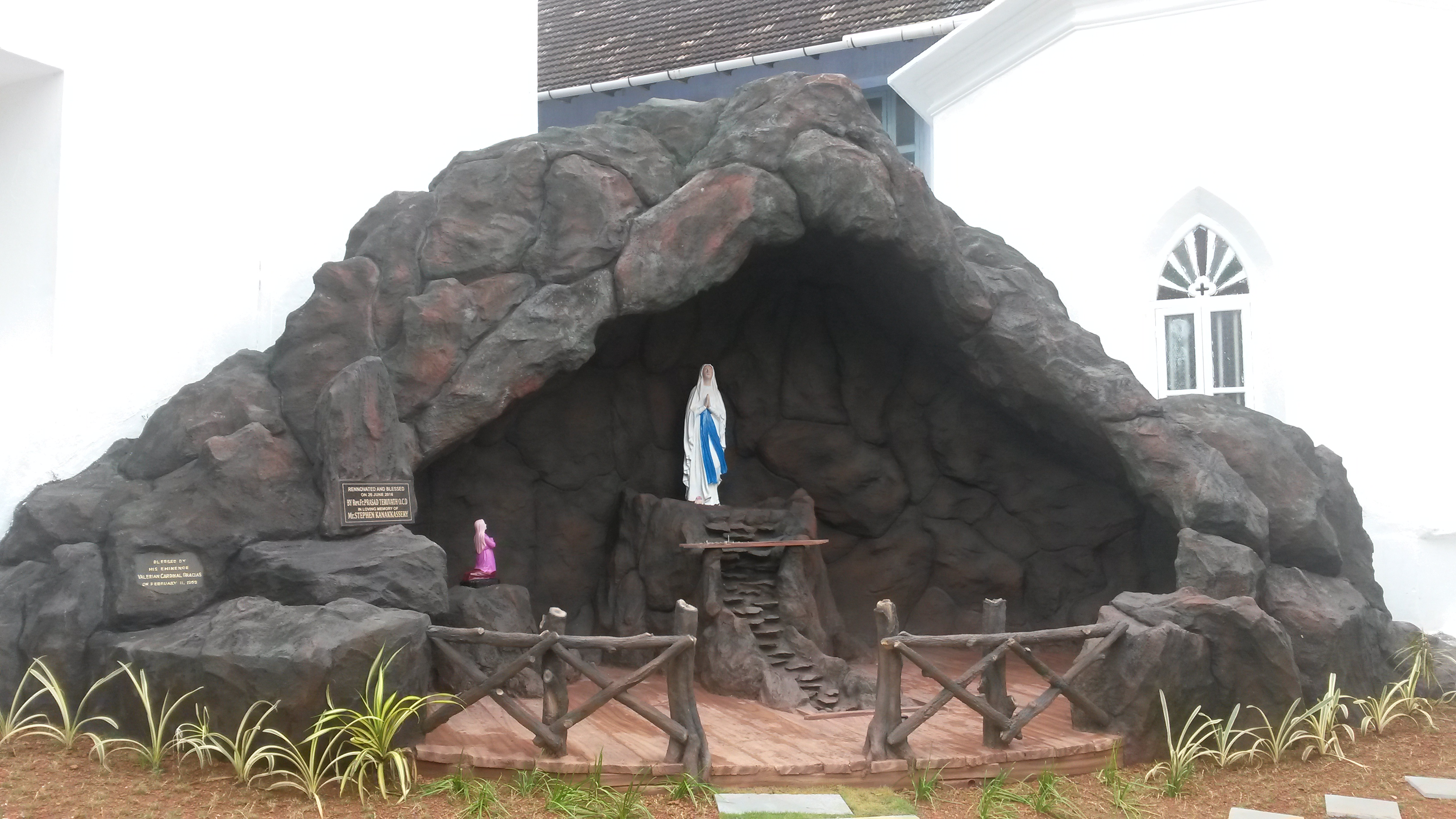
Grotto of Mother Mary

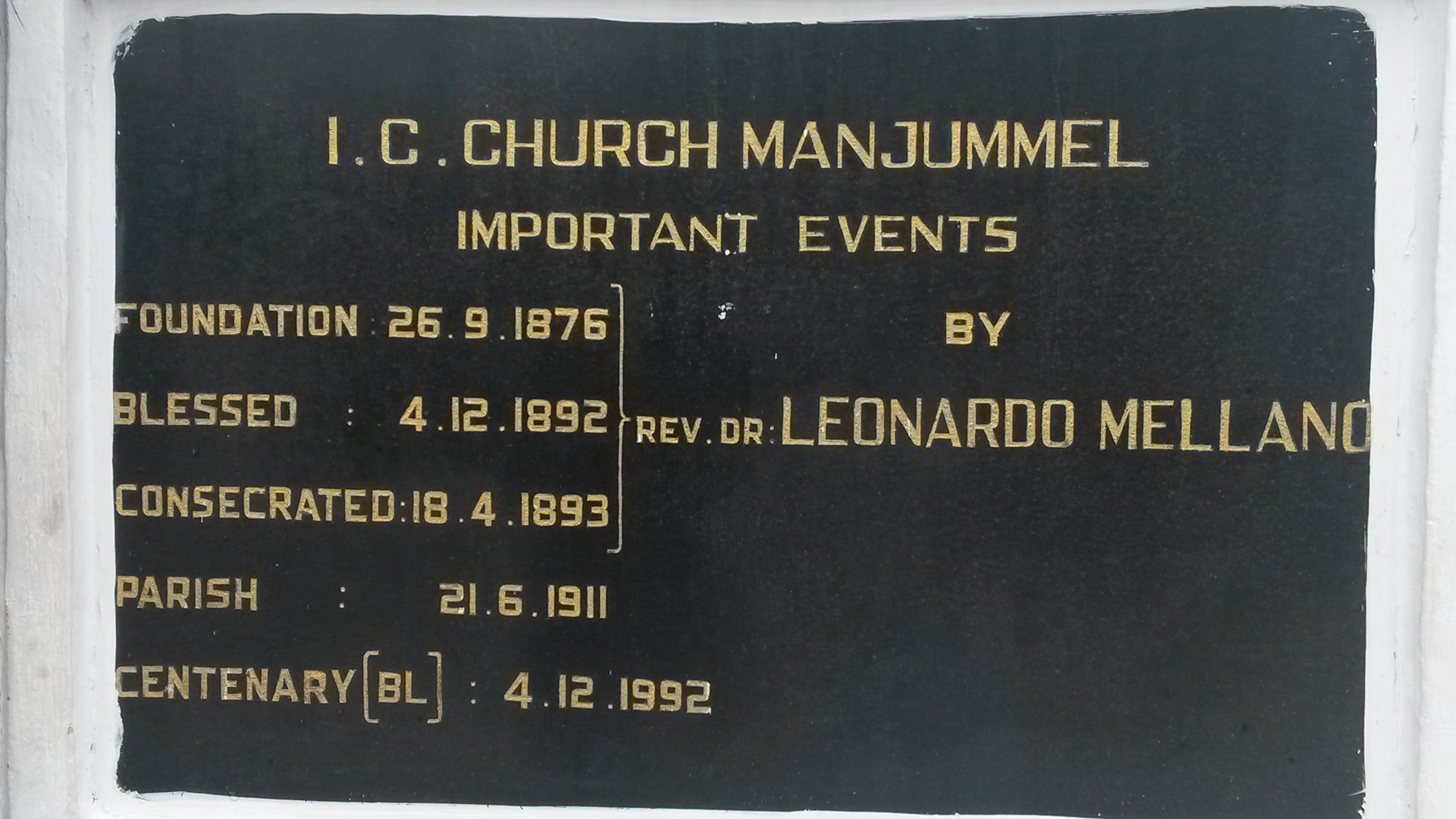
Manjummel Church stone inscription

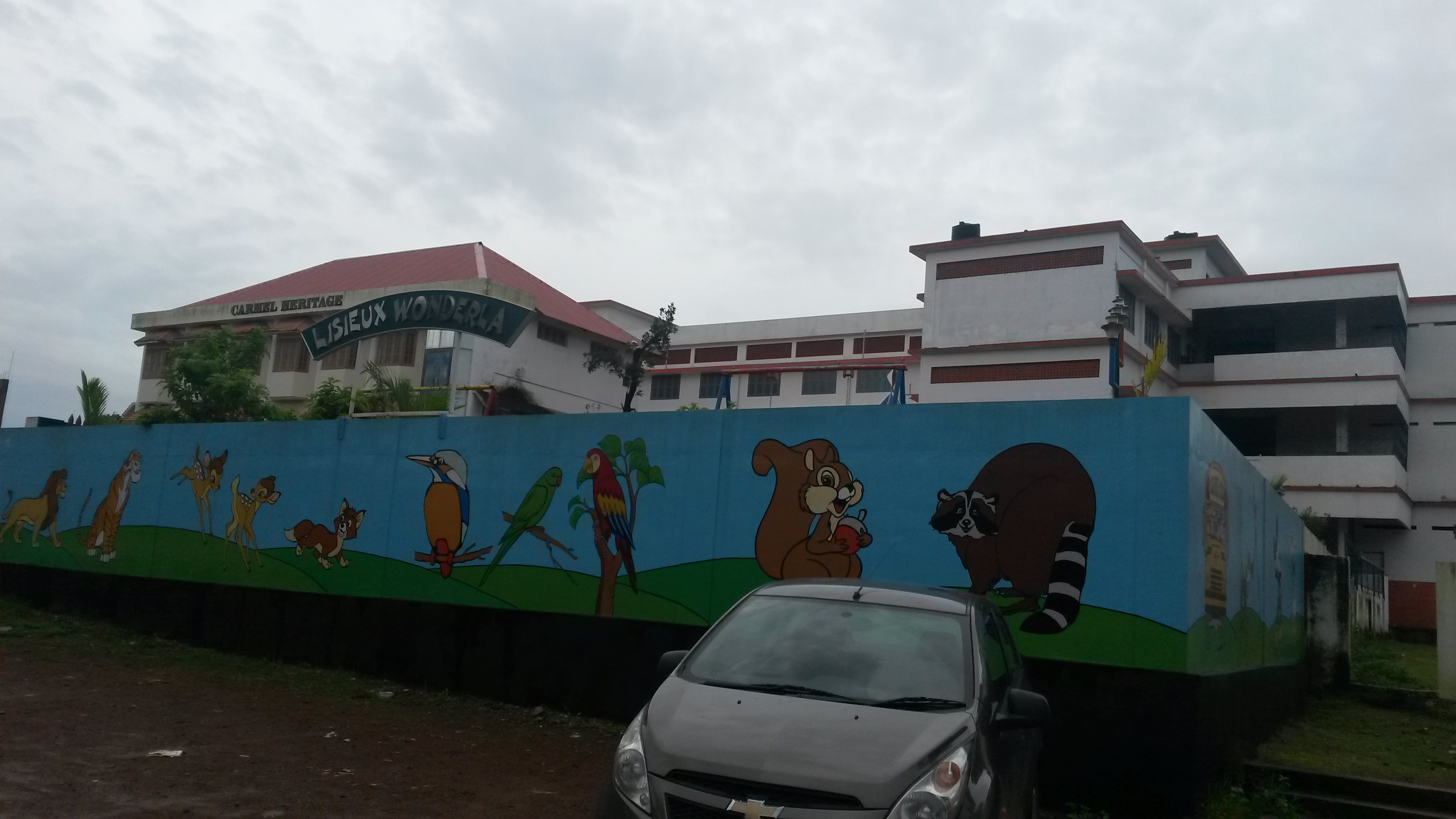
Lisieux Wonderla theme park

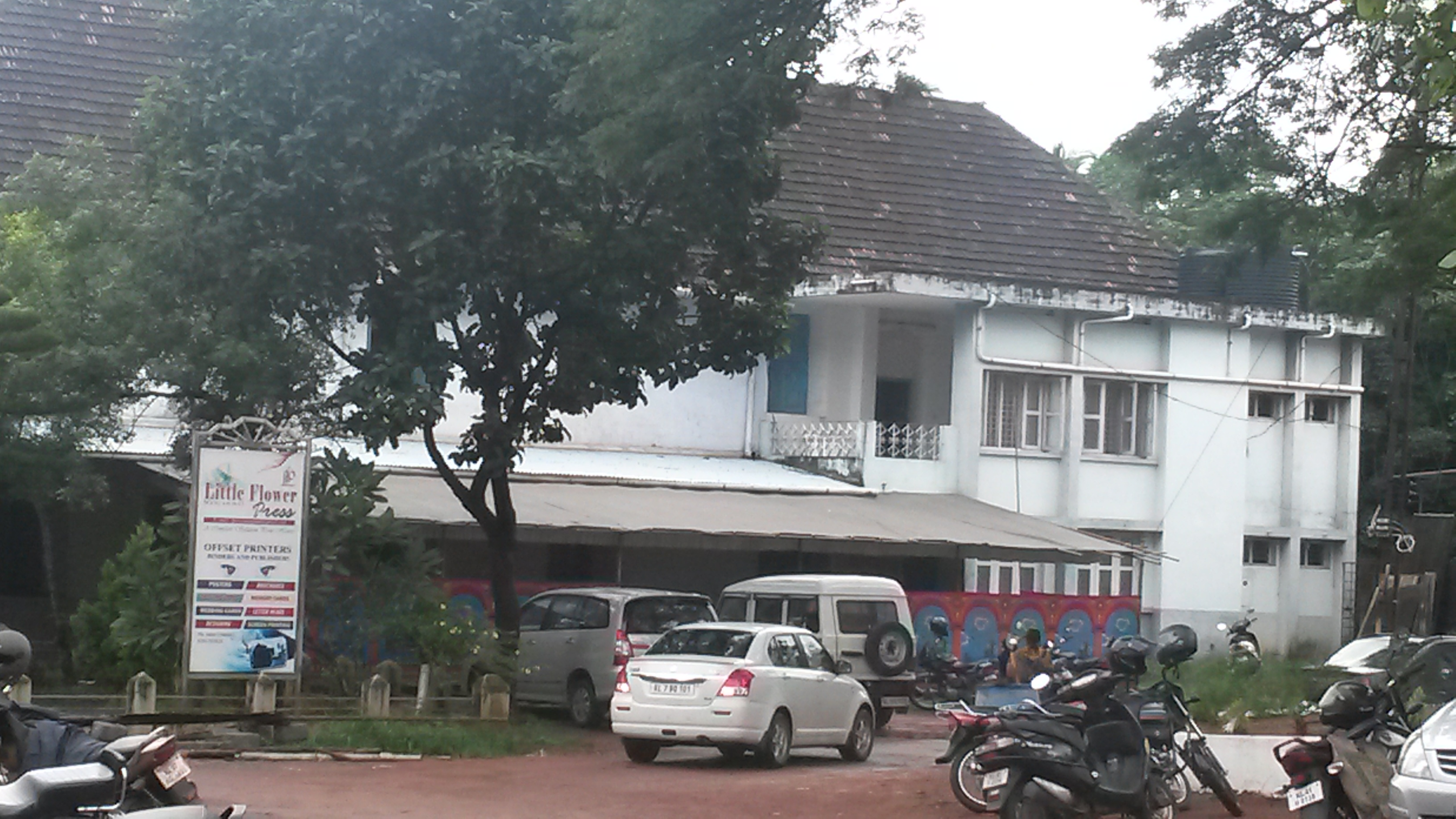
Little Flower Press
