= Ambalamedu High School =

Coordinates: 9.9829°N 76.3871°E

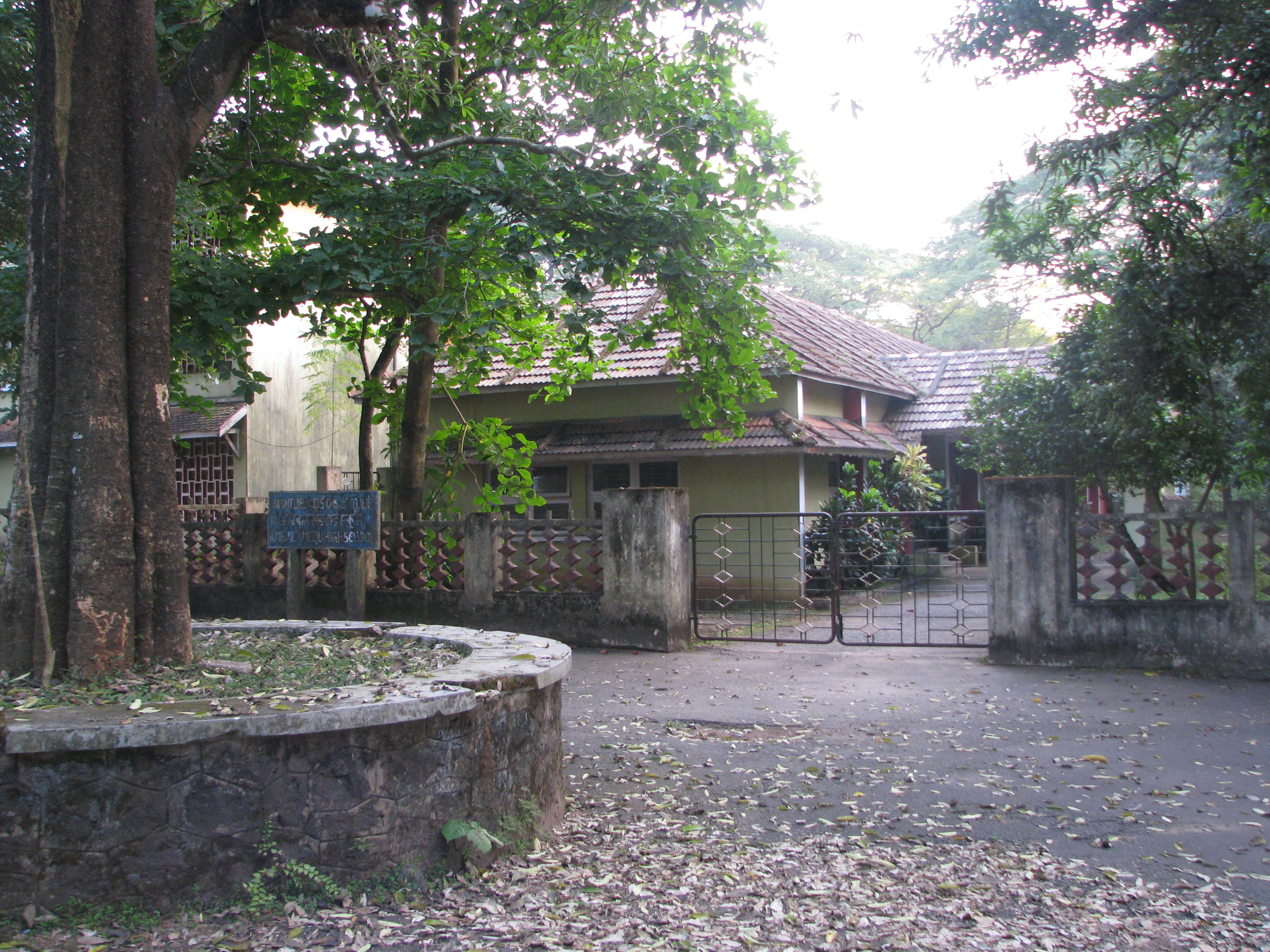
- Kochi, Kerala; India

Information
- School type: British Education System with Kerala Syllabus
- Established: 18 May 1970
- Closed: 31 March 2011
- School district: Ernakulam

Ambalamedu High School (AHS) was a school in Kerala, India. AHS offered co-curricular activities such as the Nature Club, Maths Club, Science Club, School Band, Youth Festival, Scouts, Guides, and NCC.

== Formation ==
The school was inaugurated on May 18, 1970, and the first SSLC batch in 1973 consisted of four students. It maintained a continuous 100% pass rate in the SSLC board examinations. It was managed by the Cochin Division of the Fertilizers and Chemicals Travancore Ltd (FACT). The school had an all-pass status until 2004, the last year it was run by FACT before being leased to private management.

== Tenure under TocH Residential Public School ==
Ambalamedu High School was handed over to TocH Residential Public School (Prabhat Residential Public School) in 2004. The private firm ran the school for five years and handed in back to FACT in 2009. A trust formed under a society in FACT managed the school for another two years for the sake of the students who were in class nine and ten. It closed down in 2011.

== Closure ==
The school closed at the end of 2011 when the company declined to continue its operation. Today, the school exists only in memory. Mr. V Gopalakrishna Pillai was the last headmaster of the school.

== Notable alumni ==
- former NASA scientist Rajeev Nambiar,
- student scientist Manu S. Madhav, who was part of NASA's Mars Redrover project,
- Dr Hafeez Rahman, chairman of Sunrise Hospitals,
- CA.Dr. Binoy J. Kattadiyil, Economist; managing director, IPA, Insolvency & Bankruptcy Board of India,
- actor Krishnakumar.
- Ananthu M
