= Fertilisers and Chemicals Travancore =

Chemical manufacturing company in India

The Fertilisers and Chemicals Travancore Limited (FACT)
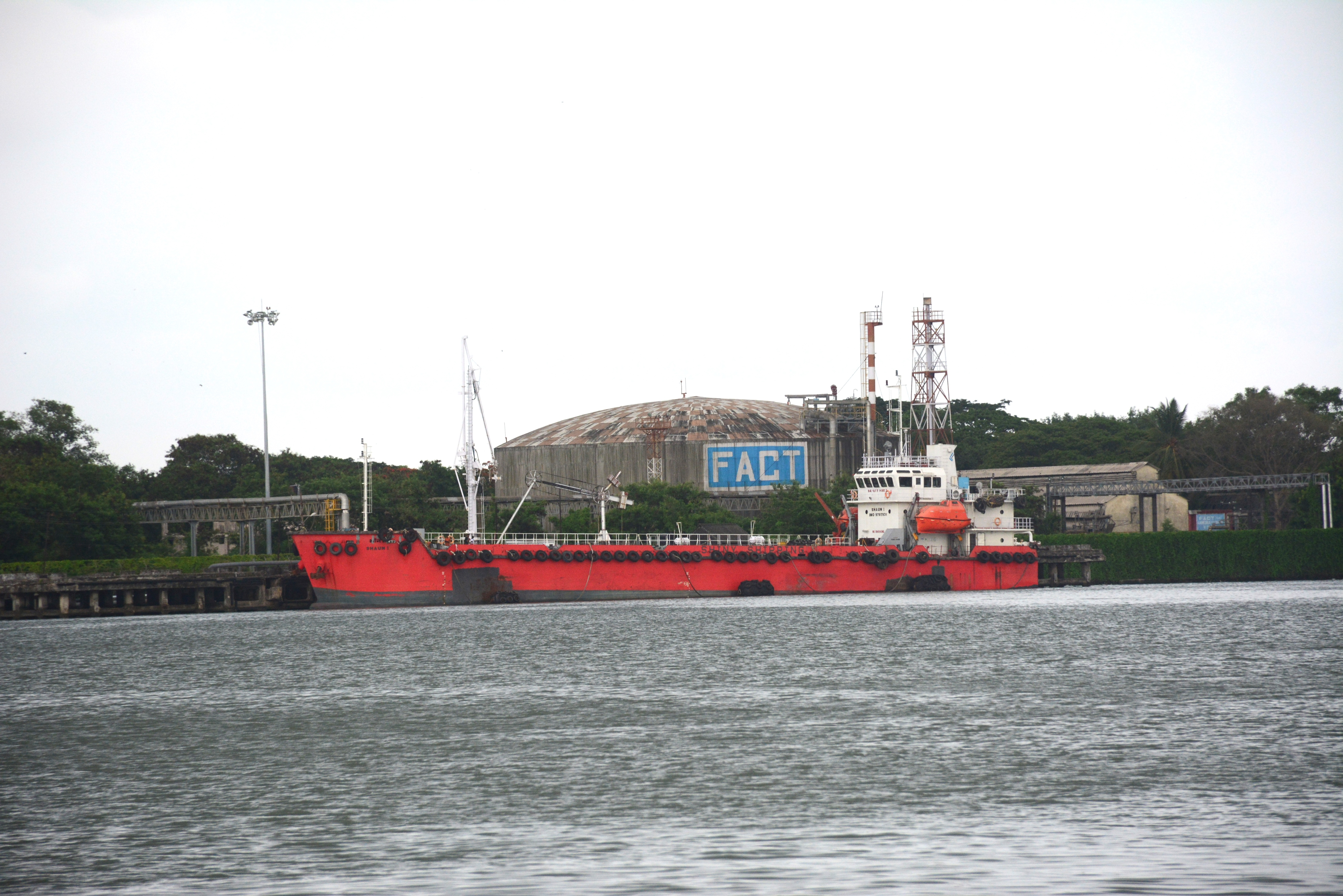
- FACT Cochin Division
- Type: Public
- Traded as: BSE: 590024; NSE: FACT
- Industry: Agrochemical
- Founded: 1943; 83 years ago
- Founder: Chithira Thirunal Balarama Varma
- Headquarters: Kochi, Kerala, India
- Area served: India
- Key people: S Sakthimani (Chairman & Managing Director)
- Products: Ammonia; Sulfuric acid; Ammonium phosphate-sulfate (FACTAMFOS); Ammonium sulfate; Zincated ammonium phosphate; Caprolactam
- Owner: Government of India (90%)
- Divisions: Udyogamandal Complex (UC); Cochin Division (CD)
- Website: www.fact.co.in

The Fertilisers and Chemicals Travancore Limited, abbreviated as FACT, is an Indian central public sector undertaking headquartered in Kochi, Kerala. It was incorporated in 1943, by Maharajah Sree Chithira Thirunal Balarama Varma of the Kingdom of Travancore. It was the first fertilizer manufacturing company in independent India and also the largest Central Public Sector Undertaking (CPSU) in Kerala. The company is under the ownership of Government of India and administrative control of the Ministry of Chemicals and Fertilizers.

It has 2 production units - Udyogamandal Complex (UC) at Eloor, Udyogamandal, and Cochin Division (CD) at Ambalamedu. In 1947, FACT started production of ammonium sulfate with an installed capacity of 50,000 MT per annum at Udyogamandal near Kochi. The Caprolactam plant in Udyogamandal was commissioned in 1990. Main products include ammonia, sulfuric acid, ammonium phosphate-sulfate (FACTAMFOS), ammonium sulfate, zincated ammonium phosphate, caprolactam, and also complex fertilizers. gypsum, nitric acid, soda ash and coloured ammonium sulfate are major by-products.

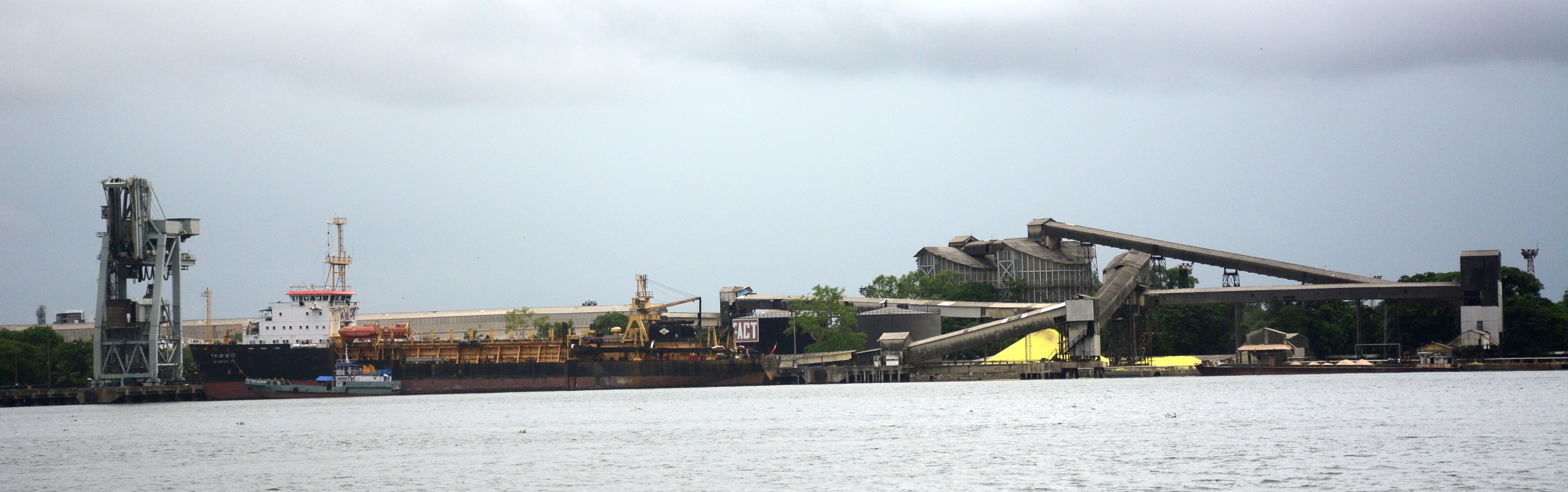
Panoramic view of FACT Cochin Division

== History ==
The factory commenced production of ammonium sulfate in 1947, at the dawn of Indian independence using wood as the raw material for production of ammonia. With the effect of time, wood gasification became uneconomic and was replaced with Naphtha reforming process. Through a series of expansion programmes, FACT soon became the producer of a wide range of fertilizers for all crops and all soil types in India. It became a Kerala State public sector enterprise in 1960 and in 1962, it came under the Government of India. The consultancy unit known as FACT Engineering and Design Organisation (FEDO) was set up in 1965 and has since diversified into chemicals, petrochemicals, hydrometallurgy, pharmaceuticals and other areas. The fabrication division, FACT Engineering works (FEW) was established in 1966. FACT has formed a joint venture company with Rashtriya Chemicals & Fertilizers Limited, named FRBL (FACT RCF Building Products Ltd) for manufacturing load-bearing panels and other building products using phosphogypsum.
