= Cochin Thirumala Devaswom =

- കൊച്ചി തിരുമല ദേവസ്വം / ഗോശ്രീപുരം
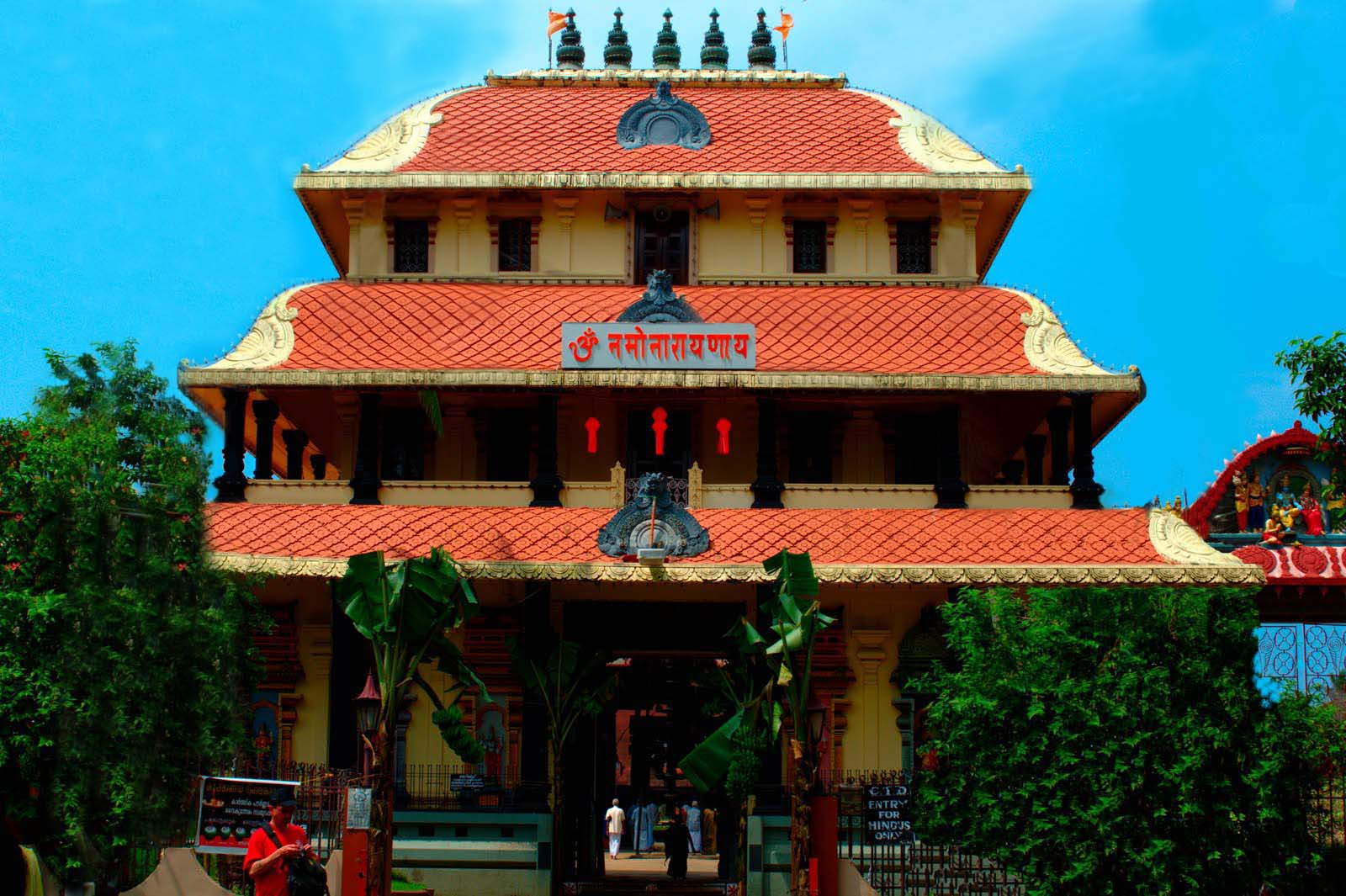
- CTD Raja Gopuram

Religion
- Affiliation: Hinduism
- District: Ernakulam
- Deity: Venkatachalapathi (Vishnu), Gosripuresha
- Festivals: Maholsavam and Ratholsavam

Location
- Location: Mattancherry
- State: Kerala
- Country: India
- Interactive map of Cochin Thirumala Devaswom

Architecture
- Type: Different from Dravidian architecture (Kerala style)
- Completed: 1599 AD
- Temples: 4 Upakovils, one Nagayakshi and one Swamiyar Samadhi inside, 4 small and one big sub-temples outside

Website
- http://gosripuram.org/

Cochin Tirumala Devaswom, also called Gosripuram is in Mattancherry, Kerala, India.
