= Kashi Math =

Spiritual organisation of Goud Saraswat Brahmins

- Sri Kashi Math Samsthan
- Deities of Samsthan Kashi Math

Religion
- Affiliation: Madhvacharya's Dvaita Siddhantha
- Deity: Vyasa Raghupathi Narasimha
- Festivals: Vyas Jayanthi, Ugadi Narashima Jayanthi, Vaishaka Poornima, Chaturmasa Vrutha, Krishna Janmashtami, Ganesh Chaturthi, Anantha Chaturdashi, Navaratri, Punyatithi Aaradhana of Shrimad Madhavendra Tirtha Swamiji, Shrimad Bhuvanendra Tirtha Swamiji, Shrimad Varadendra Tirtha Swamiji, Shrimad Sukratindra Tirtha Swamiji, and Shrimad Sudhindra Tirtha Swamiji, Righupakarma, Nagar Panchami, Vyas Mandir Pratishtha Mahotsav (Haridwar Vardanthi)

Location
- Location: Varanasi
- State: Uttar Pradesh
- Country: India

Architecture
- Founder: Vijayendra Tirtha by initiating Sanyasa Deeksha to Sri Yadavendra Tirtha
- Creator: Yadavendra Tirtharu of Kashi Math(1542)

Website
- https://kashimath.org/

Kashi Math is a matha (monastery) and a spiritual organisation followed by the Madhva section of Gaud Saraswat Brahmins, who are also referred as Madhwa Saraswat Brahmins or Vaishnava Saraswat Brahmins. It dates back to the 16th century. With its headquarters in Brahma Ghat, Varanasi. Kashi Math has followers all over the Konkan belt, prominently in Mumbai, Goa, Udupi, Mangalore, Kochi and other parts of Karnataka and Kerala.

== Deities ==
The principal deities of Kashi Math are charaprathishta ("moving installation") idols of Vyasa, Rama and Narasimha, who are also collectively known as the Vyasa Raghupathi Narasimha.

== Gurus ==
The Kashi Math follows the Guru-shishya tradition where the Guru of the Math initiates a shishya to succeed him upon his Samadhi. Samyamindra Thirtha is the 21st and current head (Mathadipathi) of the Math. The heads have been:

1. Yadavendra Thirtha -I
2. Keshavendra Thirtha
3. Upendra Thirtha -I
4. Yadavendra Thirtha -II
5. Raghavendra Thirtha
6. Devendra Thirtha
7. Madhavendra Thirtha
8. Jnaneendra Thirtha
9. Yadavendra Thirtha -III
10. Upendra Thirtha -II
11. Rajendra Thirtha
12. Sureendra Thirtha
13. Vishnu Thirtha
14. Vibhudendra Thirtha
15. Sumatheendra Thirtha
16. Vasudendra Thirtha
17. Bhuvanendra Thirtha
18. Varadendra Thirtha
19. Sukrathindra Thirtha
20. Sudhindra Thirtha
21. Samyamindra Thirtha

== List of Branch Maths ==
No	Name	Place	State	Address	Founder	Renovator
1	Varanasi Shri Kashi Math (Headquarters)	Varanasi	Uttar Pradesh	K 22/87, Brahma Ghat, Varanasi – 221001, (UP IN)	Cochin GSB's; AD 1540	Shrimad Sudhindra Thirtha Swamiji; AD 1977
2	Prayag Shri Kashi Math	Prayag	Uttar Pradesh	43, Mori Dharaganj, Prayag, Allahabad – 211 006,(UP IN)	Shrimad Rajendra Thirtha Swamiji	Shrimad Sudhindra Thirtha Swamiji
3	Kalpi Shri Kashi Math (Sri Bala Vyas Mandir)	Kalpi	Uttar Pradesh	Vyas Tila, Vyas Nagar, Kalpi – 285204, Jalaun Dist, (UP IN)	–	–
4	Haridwar Shri Vyas Ashram	Haridwar	Uttarakhand	Haripur Marg, P.O. Sadhubela, Haridwar – 249 410 (UT IN)	Shrimad Sudhindra Thirtha Swamiji; AD 1988	–
5	Badri Shri Vyas Ashram	Badrinath	Uttarakhand	Purana Mana Road, Badrinath – 246422 (UT IN)	–	–
6	Nagpur Shri Vyas Ashram (Sri Venkatesh Balaji Mandir)	Nagpur	Maharashtra	Plot No. 5, Phase II, Vasundara Green Farm House, Mouza Panjari, Wardha Highway, Nagpur – 441108	–	–
7	Nasik Shri Vyas Ashram (Sri Ramanjaneya Mandir)	Nasik	Maharashtra	Kailas Nagar, Nasik – Aurangabad Road, Nasik 422 003 (MH IN)	Shrimad Sudhindra Thirtha Swamiji; AD 1994	–
8	Dahisar Shri Kashi Math (Sri Vittal Rukumai Mandir)	Mumbai	Maharashtra	317-B Sri Sudhindra Nagar, Dahisar (E), Mumbai – 400068 (MH IN)	–	–
9	Walkeshwar Shri Kashi Math	Mumbai	Maharashtra	85, Banaganga Road, Walkeshwar, Mumbai – 400 006, (MH IN)	Shrimad Madhavendra Thirtha Swamiji	Shrimad Sukratindra Thirtha Swamiji; AD 1937
10	Khed Shri Kashi Math	Khed	Maharashtra	Barne Naka, Shinde Wade Jawala, N.H. 17, Post Barne, Khed Taluk – 415 709, Ratnagiri District, (MH IN)	Shrimad Sudhindra Thirtha Swamiji; AD 1995	–
11	Goa Shri Kashi Math	Goa	Goa	Bandora, Ponda – 403 401 (GA IN)	Shrimad Sudhindra Thirtha Swamiji; AD 1973	–
12	Bangalore Shri Kashi Math (Sri Partha Sarathi Mandir)	Bangalore	Karnataka	No. 14, Sri Kashi Math Road, 19th Cross; Malleshwaram, Bangalore 560055 (KA IN)	Shrimad Sudhindra Thirtha Swamiji; AD 1986	–
13	Hubli Shri Kashi Math (Sri Venkataramana Mandir)	Hubli	Karnataka	Behind Nrupathunga Hills (Venkatagiri), J.K. School Road, Shakthi Colony, Hubli – 580032 (KA IN)	–	–
14	Bhatkal Shri Kashi Math	Bhatkal	Karnataka	Raghunath Road, II Cross, Bhatkal – 581320, UK District (KA IN).	Shrimad Yadavendra Thirtha Swamiji; AD 1542	–
15	Basrur Shri Kashi Math (Sri Venkatramana Temple)	Basrur	Karnataka	Basrur, Udupi Dist – 576 211 (KA IN)	Shrimad Keshavendra Thirtha Swamiji	–
16	Hemmady Shri Kashi Math (Sri Gopinatha Temple)	Hemmady	Karnataka	N.H-66, Near Bus Stand, Hemmady PO, Kundapur Taluk – 574 203 Udupi district (KA IN)	Shrimad Keshavendra Thirtha Swamiji	–
17	Kota Shri Kashi Math (Sri Muralidhara Krishna Temple)	Kota	Karnataka	NH 66, Kota 576 211, Udupi district (KA IN)	Sri Subraya Bhat & His Brothers	–
18	Sasthan Shri Kashi Math (Sri Rama Mandir)	Sasthan	Karnataka	Pandeshwar village, Sasthan; Udupi district (KA IN)	–	–
19	Nayampalli Shri Kashi Math (Sri Gopal Krishna Temple)	Nayampalli	Karnataka	Nayampalli, Santhekatte-576 125, Udupi district, (KA IN)	–	–
20	Shirva Shri Kashi Math (Sri MahalasaNarayani Temple)	Shirva	Karnataka	Post Shirva Udupi Dist -574116 (KA IN)	–	–
21	Karkala Shri Kashi Math (Sri Venkataramana Temple)	Karkala	Karnataka	Opp. Sri Venkataramana Temple, Car Street, Karkala 574 104, Udupi district (KA IN)	–	Shrimad Sudhindra Thirtha Swamiji; AD 1969 & 1990
22	Surathkal Shri Kashi Math (Sri Venkataramana Temple)	Surathkal	Karnataka	PB No. 28, Surathkal 574 158, DK District (KA IN)	Shrimad Sumathindra Thirtha Swamiji	Shrimad Sukratindra Thirtha Swamiji; Shrimad Sudhindra Thirtha Swamiji
23	Konchady Shri Kashi Math (Sri MahalasaNarayani Temple)	Konchady	Karnataka	Padavinangady, Konchady P O, Mangalore 575008, DK District (KA IN)	Shrimad Sudhindra Thirtha Swamiji; AD 1967	–
24	Bantwal Shri Kashi Math	Bantwal	Karnataka	Opp. Sri Venkataramana Temple, Bantwal – 574 211, DK District (KA IN)	–	–
25	Bhagamandala Shri Kashi Math	Bhagamandala	Karnataka	Main Road, Bhagamandala 571 247, Kodagu district (KA IN)	–	Shrimad Samyamindra Thirtha Swamiji; AD 2013
26	Manjeshwar Shri Kashi Math (Srimad Anantheshwar Temple)	Manjeshwar	Kerala	Behind Srimath Ananteshwar Temple, Manjeshwar – 670323 (KL IN)	–	–
27	Ambalamedu Shri Kashi Math (Sri Kuladevata Mandir Complex)	Ambalamedu	Kerala	Ambalamedu Shri Kashi Math, Ambalamedu 682 303, Ernakulam. (KL IN)	Shrimad Sudhindra Thirtha Swamiji; AD 1992	–
28	Pallipuram Shri Kashi Math (Sri LN Raghupati Devaswom)	Pallipuram	Kerala	P.O. Pallipport – 683 515; Ernakulam Dist (KL IN).	–	–
29	Alleppy Shri Kashi Math (Venkatachalapathy Devaswom)	Alleppy	Kerala	Old Thirumala Temple, Alappuzha – 688011 (KL IN)	–	–
30	Calicut Shri Kashi Math (Sri Panduranga Mandir)	Kozhikode	Kerala	West Hill P.O. Kozhikode – 673 005 (KL IN)	Shrimad Sudhindra Thirtha Swamiji	–
31	Madras Shri Kashi Math	Chennai	Tamil Nadu	26, Kuppiah Chetty Street, West Mambalam, Chennai 600 033, (TN IN).	Shrimad Sudhindra Thirtha Swamiji; AD 1994	–
32	Rameshwara Shri Kashi Math	Rameshwaram	Tamil Nadu	101, Middle Street, Near West Gate, Rameshwaram 623 526 (TN IN).	King of Ramnad	–
33	Tirumala Shri Kashi Math	Tirupati	Andhra Pradesh	Tirumala Hills, Tirumala – 517504 (AP IN)	–	–
34	Tirupati Shri Kashi Math (Sri Gopala Krishna Mandir)	Tirupati	Andhra Pradesh	No. 242, Thimma Naidu Pallyam, Mangalam Road, Tirupati (AP IN)	Shrimad Sudhindra Thirtha Swamiji; Shrimad Samyamindra Thirtha Swamiji	–
35	Sreemath Muttah thirumala devasom (Cherthala)	Cherthala	Cherthala Alappuzha	Shrimad Madhavendra Thirtha Swamiji	–	–

== Internal strife ==
On 7 July 1989, in accordance with the guru-shishya tradition, the then guru, Sudhindra Thirtha, initiated a follower into sanyasa so that in due course they would succeed him as the 21st guru. For reasons not fully known, serious differences between Sudhindra Tirtha and his appointed successor, Raghavendra Tirtha, became apparent around 2000–2001 amidst concerns about insubordination and integrity. On 19 July 2000, the mathadipathi removed Raghavendra Tirtha from his position of successor by making use of an earlier communication from November 1999 which had requested relief from the tutelage. This removal necessitated the initiation of a new shishya to succeed Sudindra Thirtha and this was done on 20 June 2002 when Samyamindra Thirtha were initiated.

Thereafter the tussle among the pontiffs turned into a dispute over the control of the Kashi Math and the ownership of its many valuables and ornaments used during various religious observances. Those included about 234 pieces of jewelry and silver articles, as well as 27 idols including the main idol of Vyasa Raghupathi. Raghavendra Tirtha had possession of these items but was ordered by Court in Tirupathi to give them to Sudhindra Tirtha. The Court upheld the status of the senior pontiff and the mathadhipathi, accepted the junior's abdication and directed him to return all belongings of the math and refrain from interfering in its affairs.

A petition seeking a stay on the order was dismissed by the Andhra Pradesh High Court. The Supreme Court of India also confirmed the same on 2 December 2009 and upheld the High Court order recognizing Sudhendra Tirtha as mathadipadi.

After months of defying various court orders, Raghavendra Tirtha absconded with the valuables and ornaments and was arrested at Kadapa in October 2011.

Thereafter in November 2011, the 'parikaras' were handed over to Sudhindra Tirtha. Samyamindra Thirtha became main disciple (patta shishya) and successor (uttaradhikari) of Kashi Math.

Sudhindra Thirtha attained Vrindavan on 17 January 2016 at Vyasashram, Haridwar. As per the tradition, Samyamindra Thirtha became the new head of Kashi Math and they officially took charge on 28 January 2016 at Vyasashram, Haridwar. They are currently holding the 'parikaras' and offering the daily pujas.

== Parihara & Punah Prathishtta Mahotsav 2012 ==
Punah Prathishta of Sree Vyasa Raghupathi Narasimha of Shri Kashi Math Samsthan was done at Shri Venkataramana Temple on Car Street, Mangalore on Wednesday 13 June 2012.

The Punah Prathishta ceremony had begun on 9 June 2012 under the guidance of Shrimad Sudhindra Thirtha Swamiji, Mathadhipati of Shree Kashi Math Samsthan and their Patta Shishya Shrimad Samyamindra Thirtha Swamiji, who jointly conducted the rituals of the re-installation of the idol of Shri Vyasa Raghupati, the presiding deities of Shree Kashi Math Samsthan, at the Math Premises (Sri Sudhindra Sabha Sadan) in S.V Temple at the Karkataka Lagnam at 8:45 a.m.

These rituals included the Panchamrutha Abhisheka to Shri Vyasa, Raghupathi and Lord Narasimha. 108 aavarthane pavamana kalashabhisheka, gangadhi sapthaha teerthabhisheka, sanidhya Havana, mahapurnahuthi, and muhurtha nireekshane. Around 50,000 devotees, along with thousands of volunteers, took part in rituals such as prasanna puja, astamangala nireekshana, patta Kanika and other such rituals. As part of these rituals, devotees made offerings to Hari Gurus and received prasadam and blessings.

== See also ==
- Gokarna Math (Vaishnava math)
- Shri Gaudapadacharya Math (Smarta Tradition math)
