= Sudhindra Thirtha (Kashi Math) =

Indian guru

Shrimad Sudhindra Thirtha Swamiji
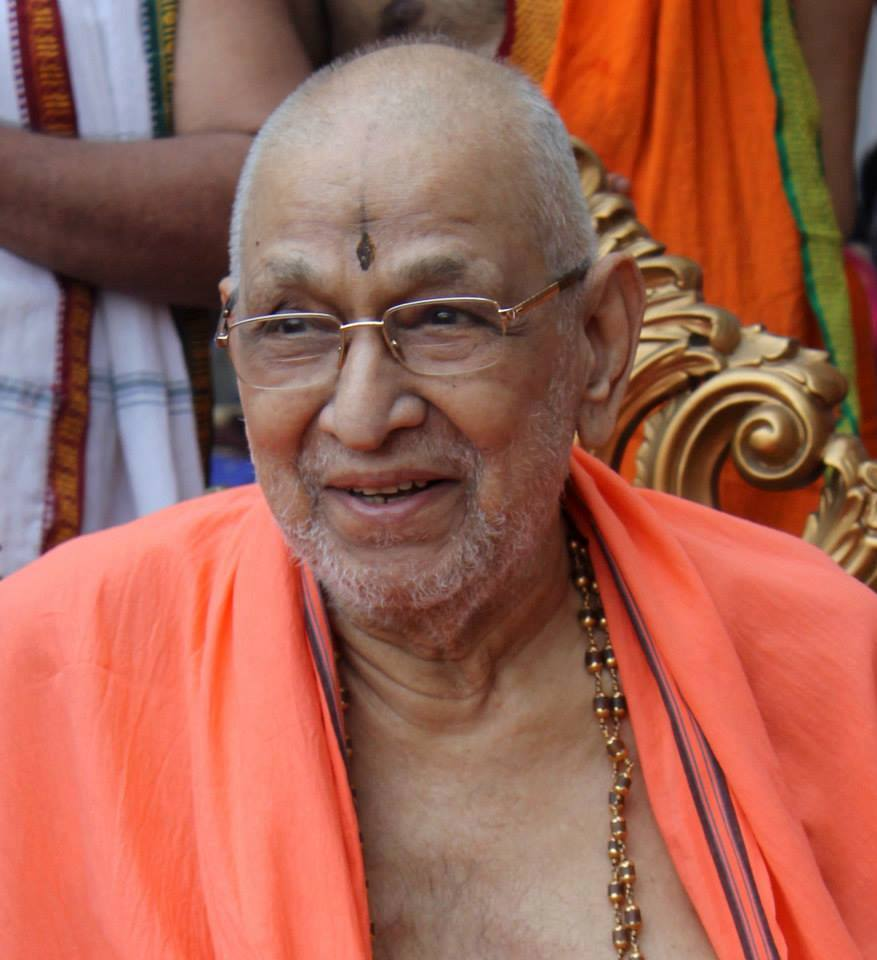
- Title: Mathadipathi

Personal life
- Born: Sadashiva Shenoy; 31 March 1926 Ernakulam, Kerala, India
- Died: 17 January 2016 (aged 89) Haridwar

Religious life
- Religion: Hinduism
- Order: 20th Mathadipathi
- Sect: Kashi Math

Religious career
- Teacher: Shrimad Sukrathindra Thirtha Swamiji
- Disciples: Shrimad Samyamindra Thirtha Swamiji
- Website: www.kashimath.org

Shrimad Sudhindra Thirtha Swamiji (31 March 1926 – 17 January 2016), also referred to as Shri Sudhindra Thirtha Swamiji, was the legal and spiritual head (mathadipathi) of the Kashi Math and the twentieth successive person called the swamiji of guru parampara.

== Education ==
Sudhindra Thirtha completed his high school education in 1942 from St. Albert's High School, Ernakulam and Intermediate course in Science from Maharajas College, Ernakulam.

== Vrindavan Sweekar ==
Sudhindra Thirtha attained Vrindavan on 17 January 2016 at Vyasa ashram, Haridwar.

As per the tradition of the math, to continue the guruparampara, on 7 July 1989, Thirtha initiated a vatu into sanyasa to be the 21st, and called him Raghavendra Thirtha. Due to internal strife Raghavendra was removed from the position and all rights in the math, with effect from 19 July 2000. Later, to continue the tradition and guruparampara of the math, it was necessary to initiate a new Shishya. Sudhindra theertha swamiji therefore initiated another vatu into sanyasa and named him as Samyamindra Thirtha swamiji on 20 June 2002 as the new successor. Thus Samyamindra become main disciple (patta shishya) & successor (uttaradhikari) of the math.
