= Aldona =

Aldona Aldonã
- Village
- Location of Aldona in Goa Aldona (India)
- Coordinates: 15°35′23″N 73°52′24″E
- Country: India
- State: Goa
- District: North Goa
- Sub-district: Bardez

Government
  - Body: Panchayat
- Elevation: 19 m (62 ft)

Population (2001)
  - Total: 6,320
- Time zone: UTC+5:30 (IST)
- PIN: 403508
- Area code: 91 0832

Aldona (or Aldonã) is a village that lies in the Bardez taluka of the Indian coastal state of Goa. It is known for producing several prominent Goans personalities.

== Geography ==
Aldona is located at 15°35′23″N 73°52′24″E at an average elevation of 19 metres (62 ft).

Aldona, as a comunidade-village, comprises around 16 wards. Bodiem and Danua wards are separated from the main village area by the Mapusa river, and come under the neighboring village of Tivim's panchayat. Aldona comunidade's other wards are Quitula, Ranoi, Coimawaddo, Gutcoi, Udoi, Cottarbhat, Santerxette, Panarim, Naikawaddo, Castelwaddo, Carona, Lankdem, Panth, Corjuem and Calvim.

== Demographics ==
As of the 2011 India census, Aldona had a population of 6,320. Males constituted 46% of the population and females 54%. Pin Code of Aldona is 403508 which comes under Goa postal division (Goa-Panaji Region, Maharashtra Circle). The average literacy rate was 79%, higher than the national average of 59.5%. Among the literate, 49% were males and 51% were females. 9% of the population was under 7 years of age.

Aldona is one of the few, if not the only, village which has two comunidades (village communities, or ganvkaria). Following "endless fights for nearly four centuries, culminating in the comunidade's bifurcation into two bodies – Communidade Fraternal of the Brahmins (which included goldsmiths) and the Comunidade de Boa Esperanca of the Chardo (Kshatriya) and Sudra castes."

== Government and politics ==
Aldona is part of Aldona (Goa Assembly constituency) and North Goa (Lok Sabha constituency).

== Religion ==
Aldona is a multi-religious village where residents include mainly Christians, Hindus, and Muslims. In addition to the Catholic Church and several Chapels, there exist temples spread all over the village. The Catholic Church is dedicated to São Tomé (St. Thomas). The Chapels include those in the localities of Carona (St. Rita de Cascia), Quitula (Nosa Senhora de Piedade) and Corjuem (Mãe de Deus).

It has several wards (vadde), which include Quitula, Goncoi, Udoim, Coimavaddo (Voilo and Sokoilo), Carona, Santerxette, Khoirut, Castel Vaddo, Naikavaddo, Panarim, Maina Vaddo, Cottarbat, Soddo, Goddar, Panarim and Ranoi.

The Central part of Aldona is connected to Corjuem by a state-of-the-art cable-stayed bridge held by six cables from either direction.

The current Catholic Patriarch of the East Indies and Archbishop of Goa and Daman, India, Filipe Neri António Sebastião do Rosário Ferrão is from Aldona (born 20 January 1953 in Santerxette, Aldona, Goa, India).

== St. Thomas Church ==
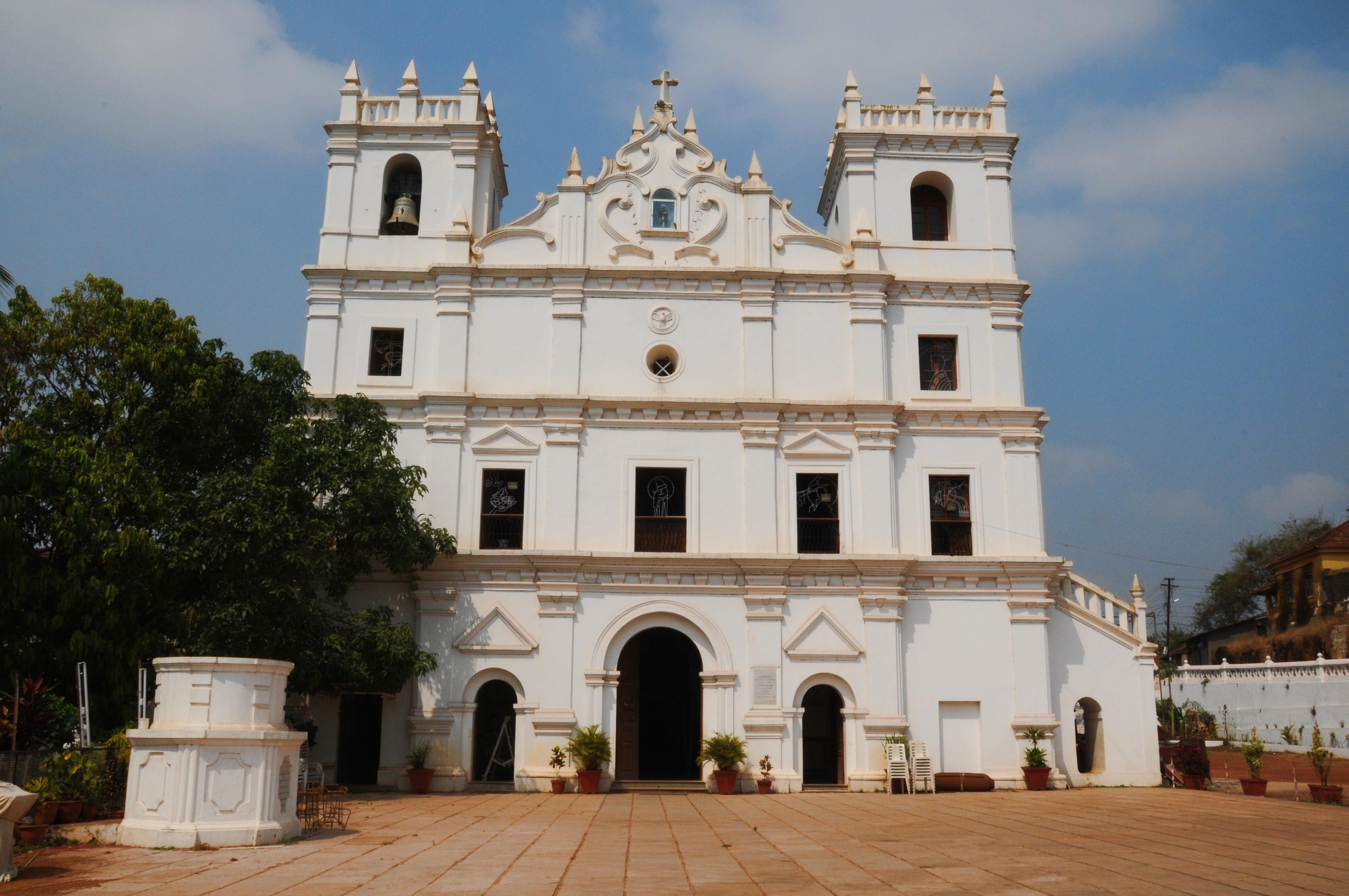
The façade of St. Thomas Church

The St. Thomas Church remains an awe-inspiring presence in Aldona. It was built in 1596 on a high plateau on the banks of the Mapusa River, a tributary of the Mandovi River. A flight of broad steps cut into a cliff leads to an open plain that surrounds the grand white building.

The Feast of St. Thomas is celebrated each year on the third Saturday following Easter Sunday.

Inside, the Church is ornately decorated with symbolic biblical murals and grand statues. The treasures of the Church are the subject of a village legend. At one time, the statues of the church were strung with jewelry by villagers as thanks for prayers answered. However, it is said that the churches were often robbed of these jewels.

The Church buildings are white-washed in the tradition of Goan churches. The bandstand on the grounds and the cemetery are also white-washed.

The gate of the church graveyard has a sign in Konkani which reads "Aiz Maka, Falea Tuka", prominently displayed at the entrance, which translates into something akin to 'Today for me, tomorrow for you', a poignant reminder of our mortality. The church's website is updated with the latest info along with a virtual tour of the church.Aldona Church Website

== Prominent landmarks ==
- Cemetery of the St. Thomas Church, Aldona
- Aldona comunidade(s): The village community. This comunidade village is believed to be at least 2000 years old.
- St Thomas Boys High School. Founded in 1923. Currently run by the Fransalian Fathers
- St. Thomas Girls School - It is run by the Sisters of the Apostolic Carmel.
- The Statue of educationist Professor Edward Soares erected at the Aldona market triangle.
- Cable-stayed bridge to Corjuem island
- Calvim bridge
- Stone bridge across Aldona backwaters
- Khorjuvem (Corjuem) fort with four wide ramps
- Cross marking the spot of the murder of Caitano Soares, en route to Ucassaim.

== Notable people ==
- Alfred Rose, singer, tiatrist, melody king of Goa
- Anil Joseph Thomas Couto, Archbishop of the Roman Catholic Archdiocese of Delhi (2013–present)
- Filipe Neri Cardinal Ferrão, the current Archbishop of Goa and Daman
- Isabel de Santa Rita Vás, author, playwright, theatre director and teacher
- Joseph Coutts, archbishop of Karachi, since 2012
- Jaime Valfredo Rangel of Corjuem, medical practitioner, director of Tipografia Rangel (Rangel Printing Press), president of the municipal council of Bardes (Mayor of Bardez) in Portuguese Goa and a delegate to the International Labour Organization for Portuguese India.
- Carlos Álvares Ferreira of Corjuem, Assistant Solicitor General of India, Public prosecutor and Advocate General of Goa, MLA of Aldona Assembly constituency.

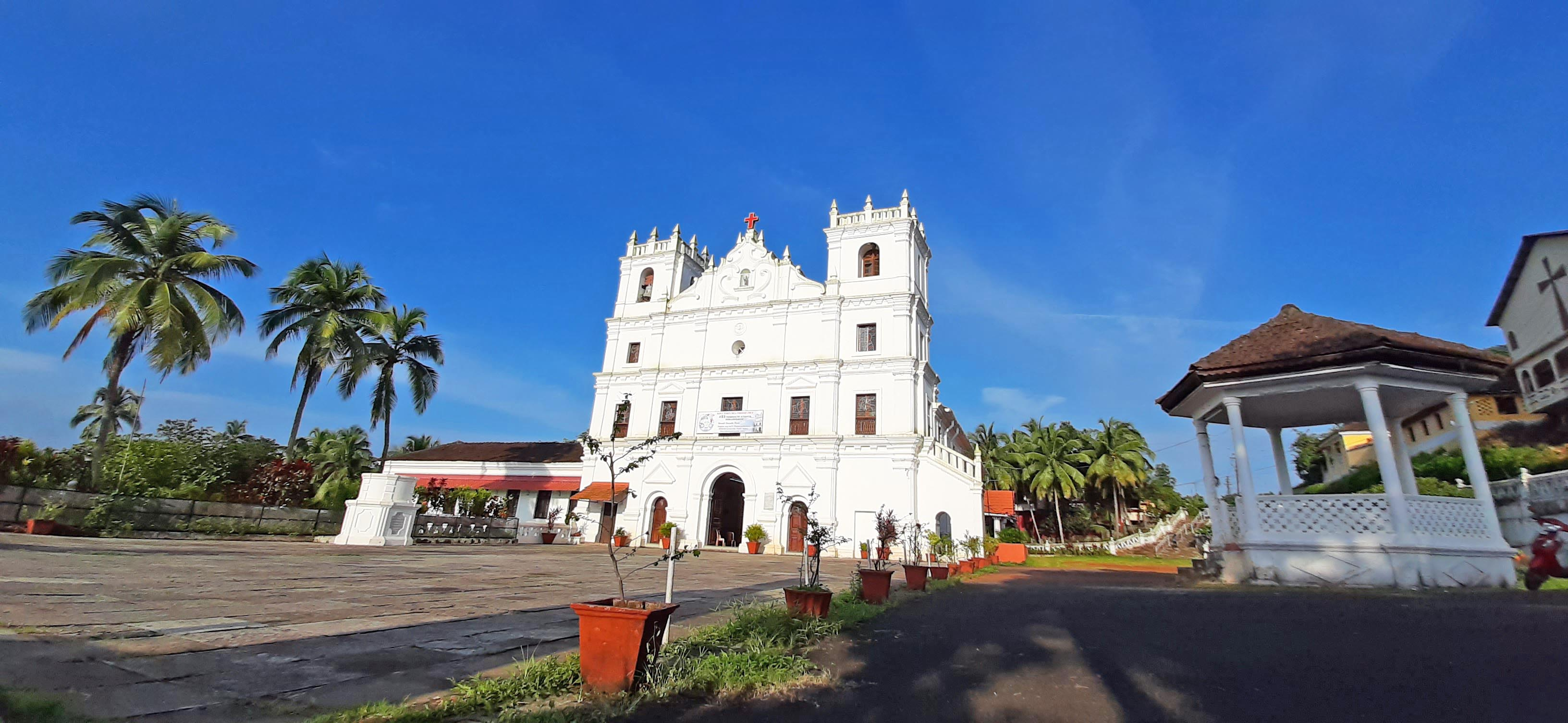

== Gallery ==
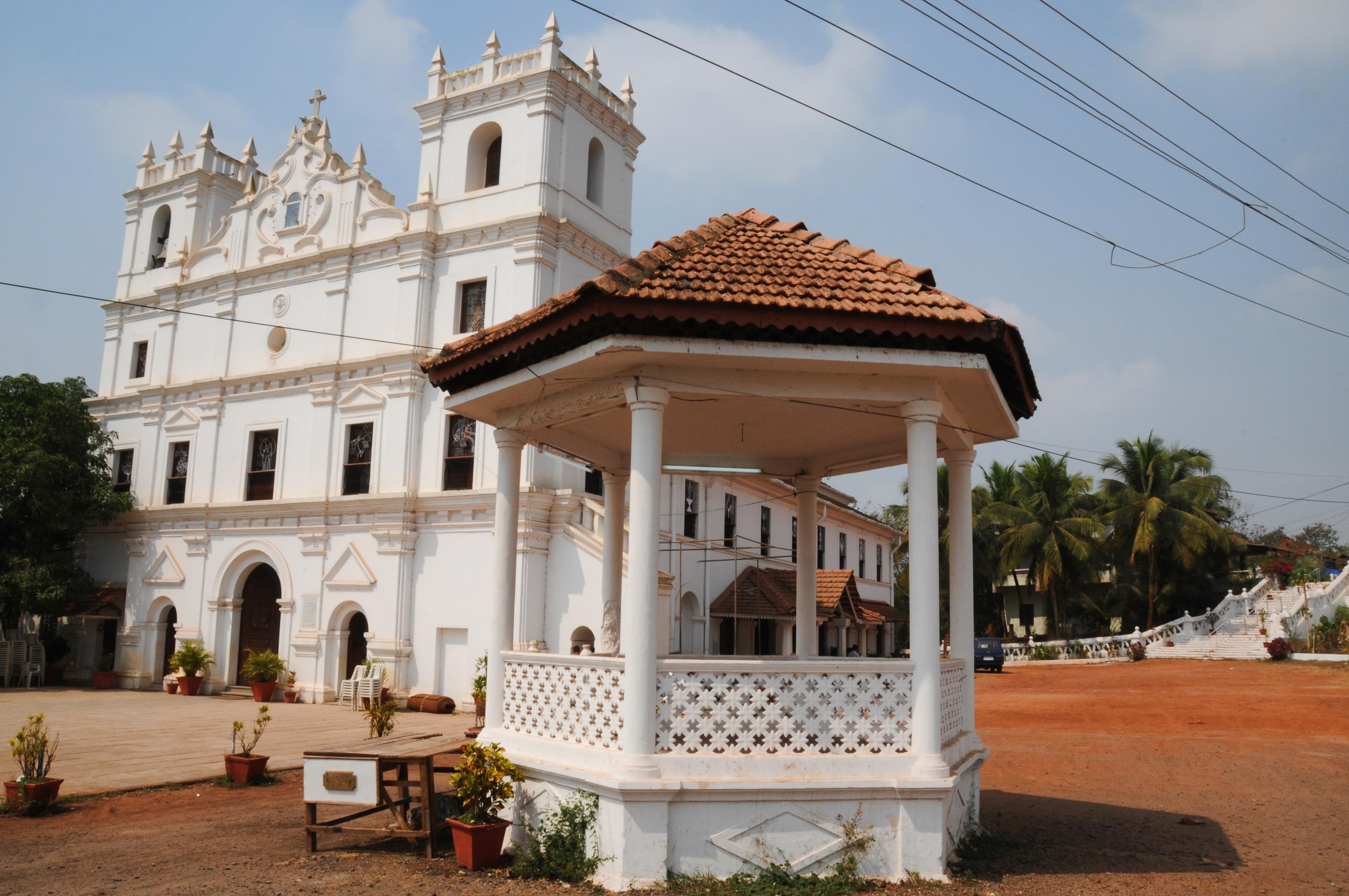
St. Thomas Church

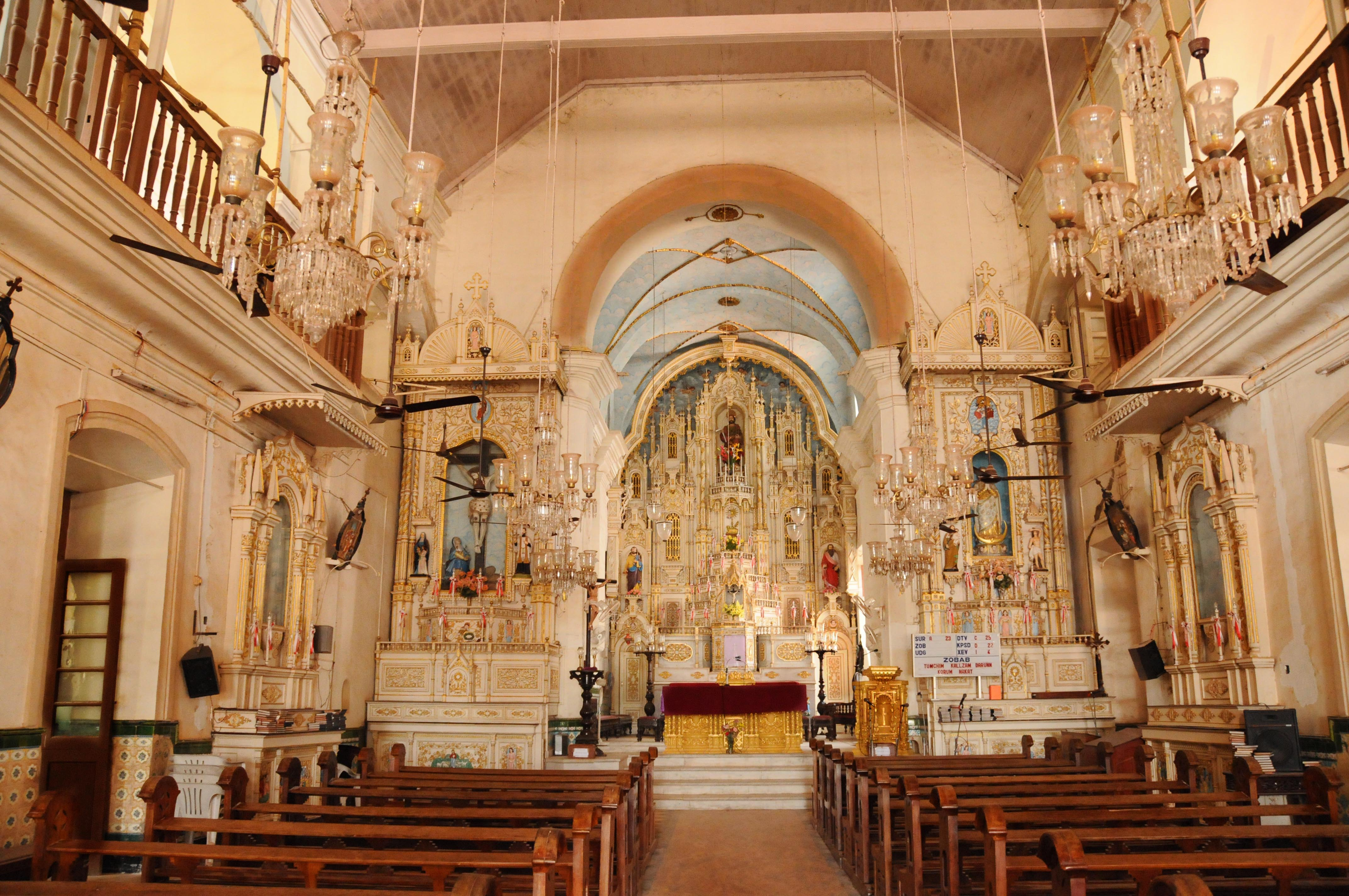
The interior of St. Thomas Church

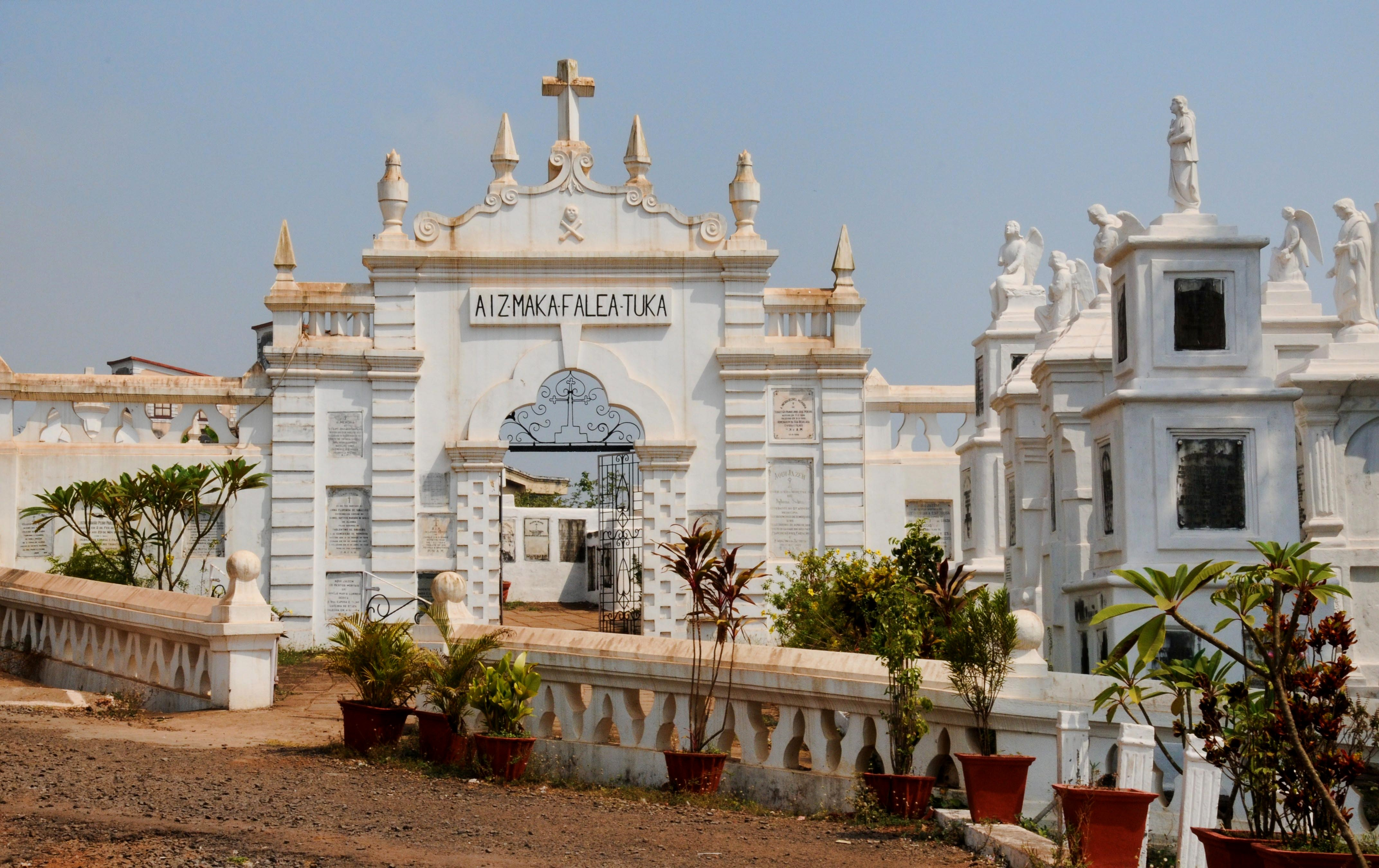
St. Thomas Church Cemetery

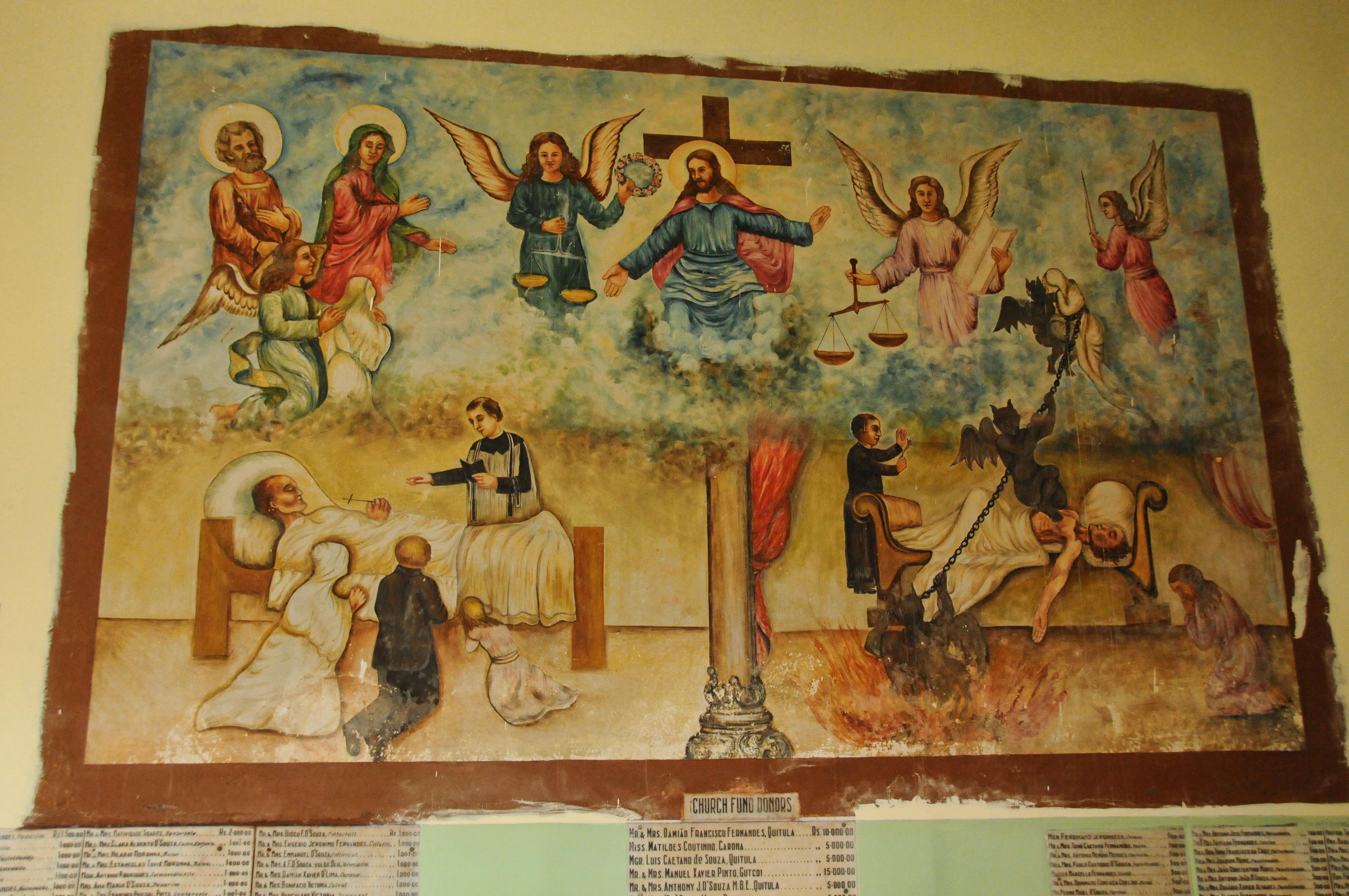
One of the many frescos that adorn the interior of St. Thomas Church

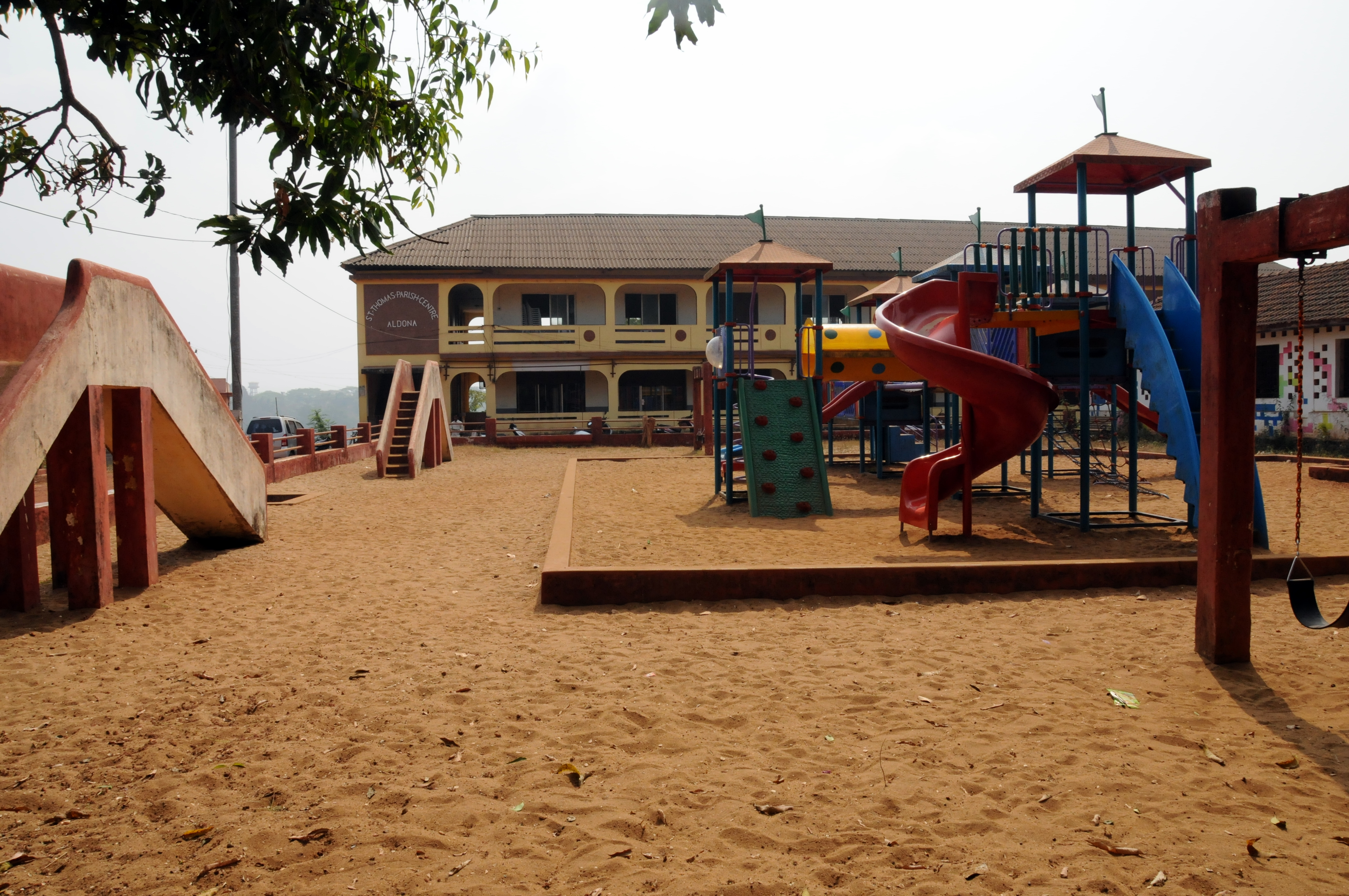
St. Thomas Parish Centre

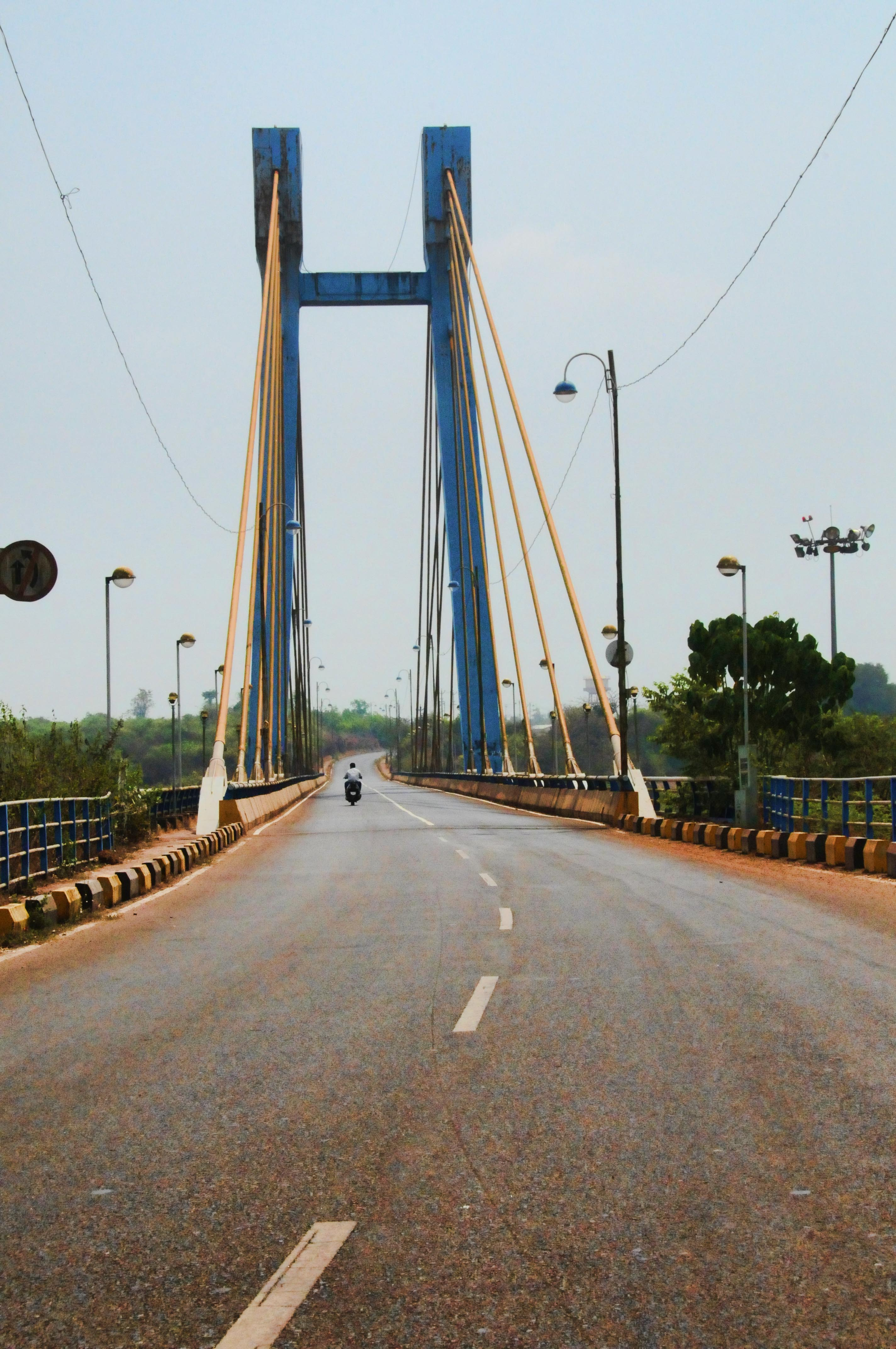
The cable bridge connecting Aldona and Corjuem

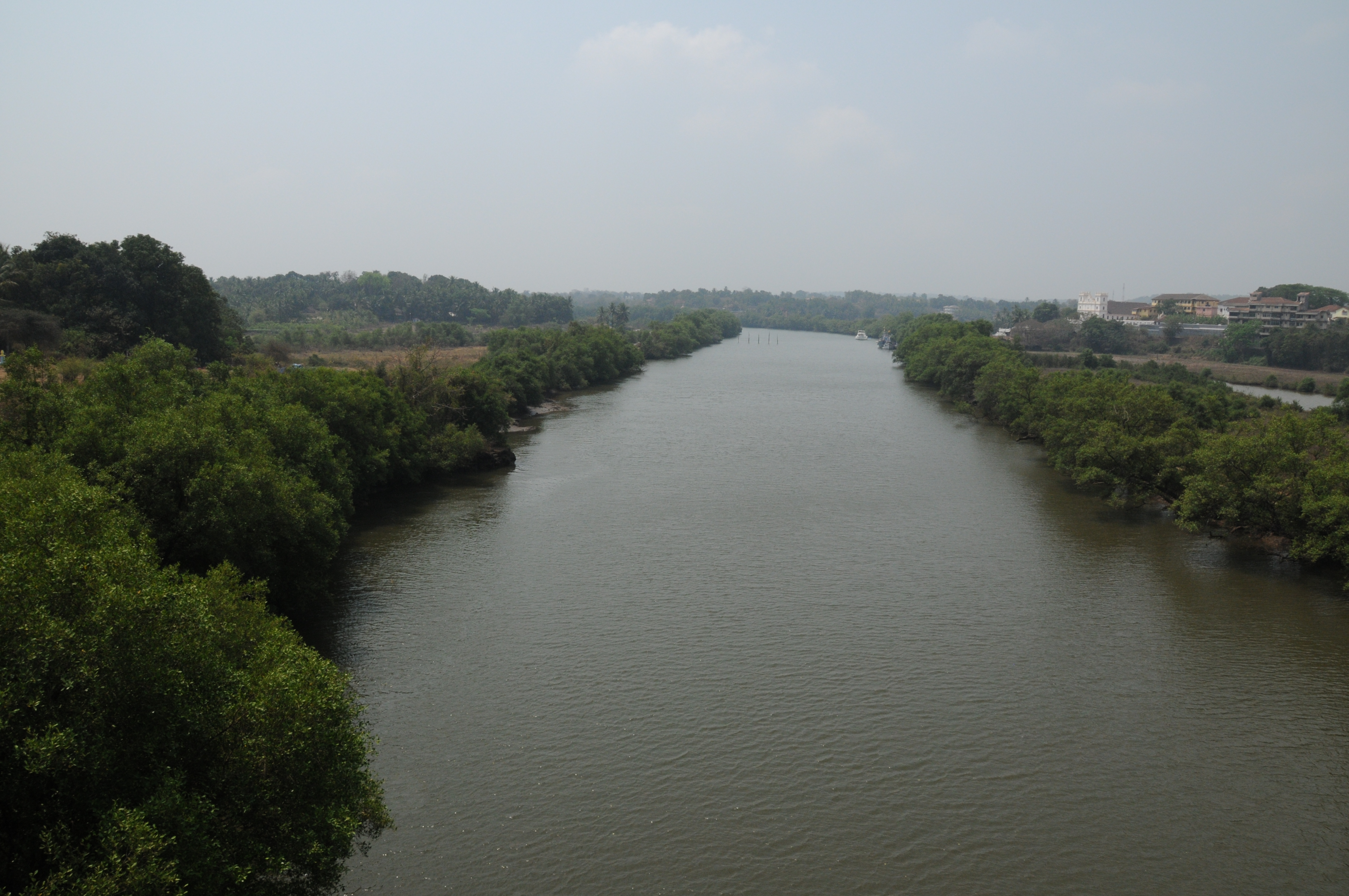
A view of St. Thomas Church and the Mapusa River tributary of the Mandovi River

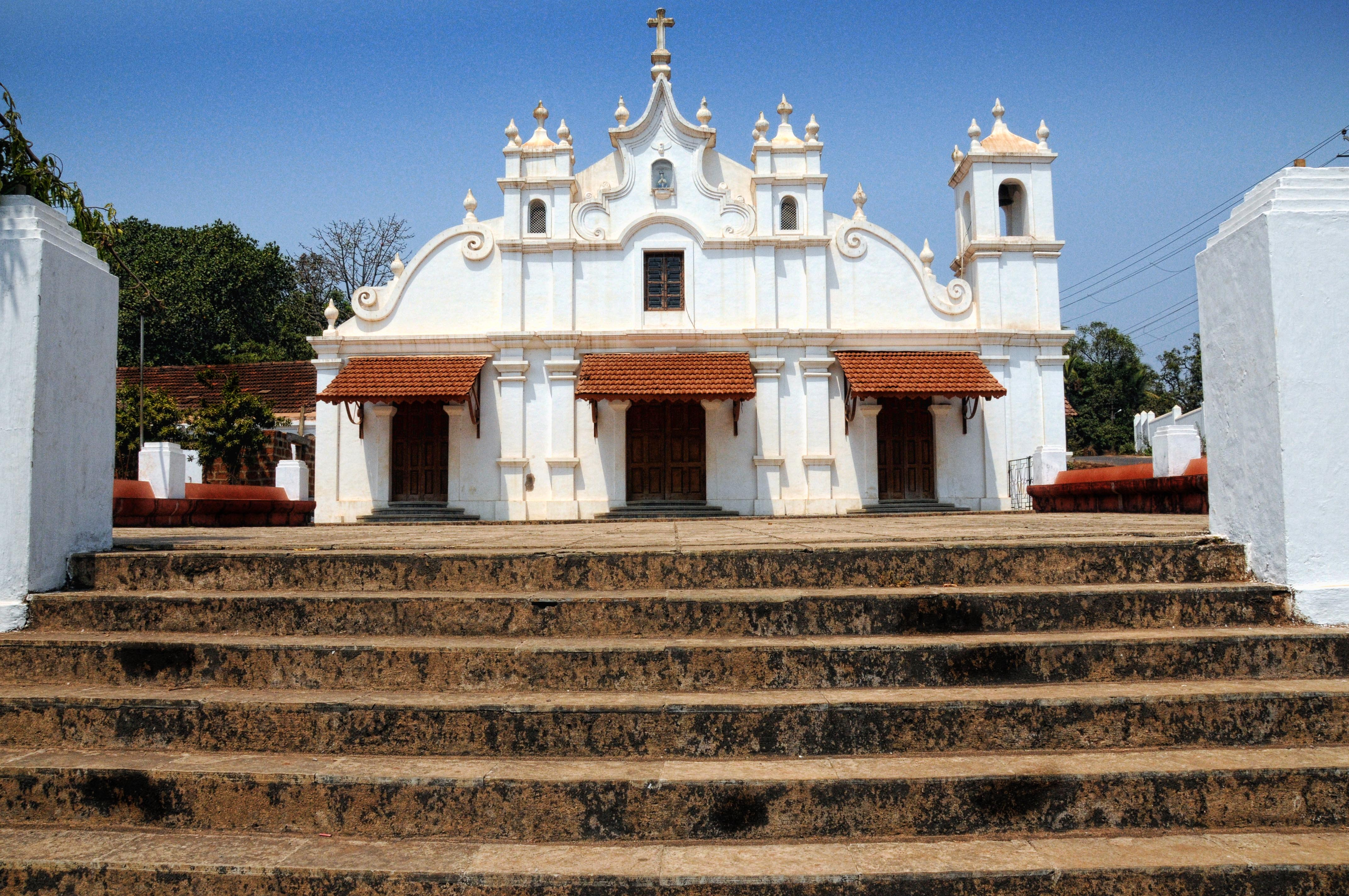
Mãe de Deus (Mother of God) Chapel in Corjuem

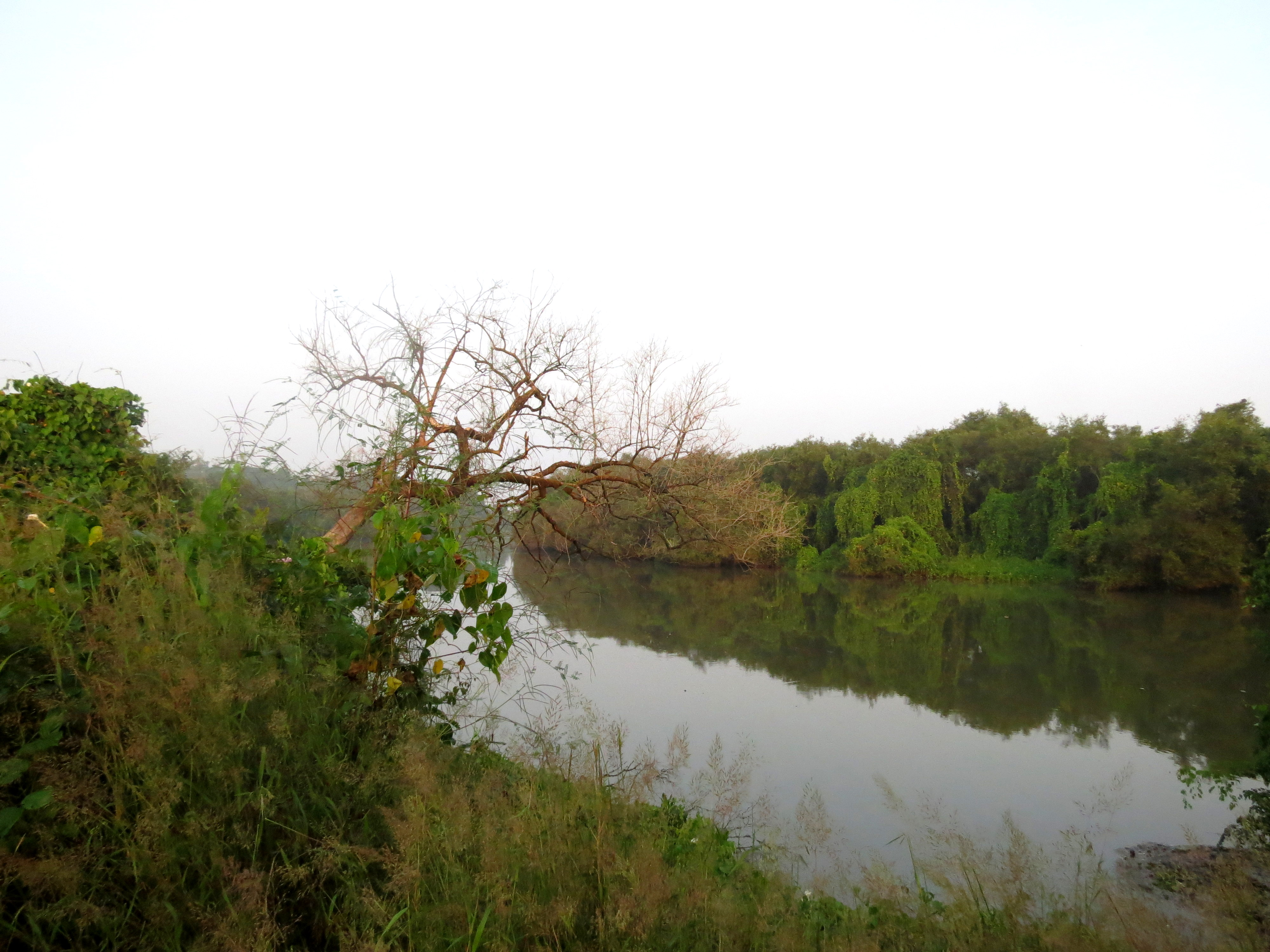
Mapusa river in Aldona Goa

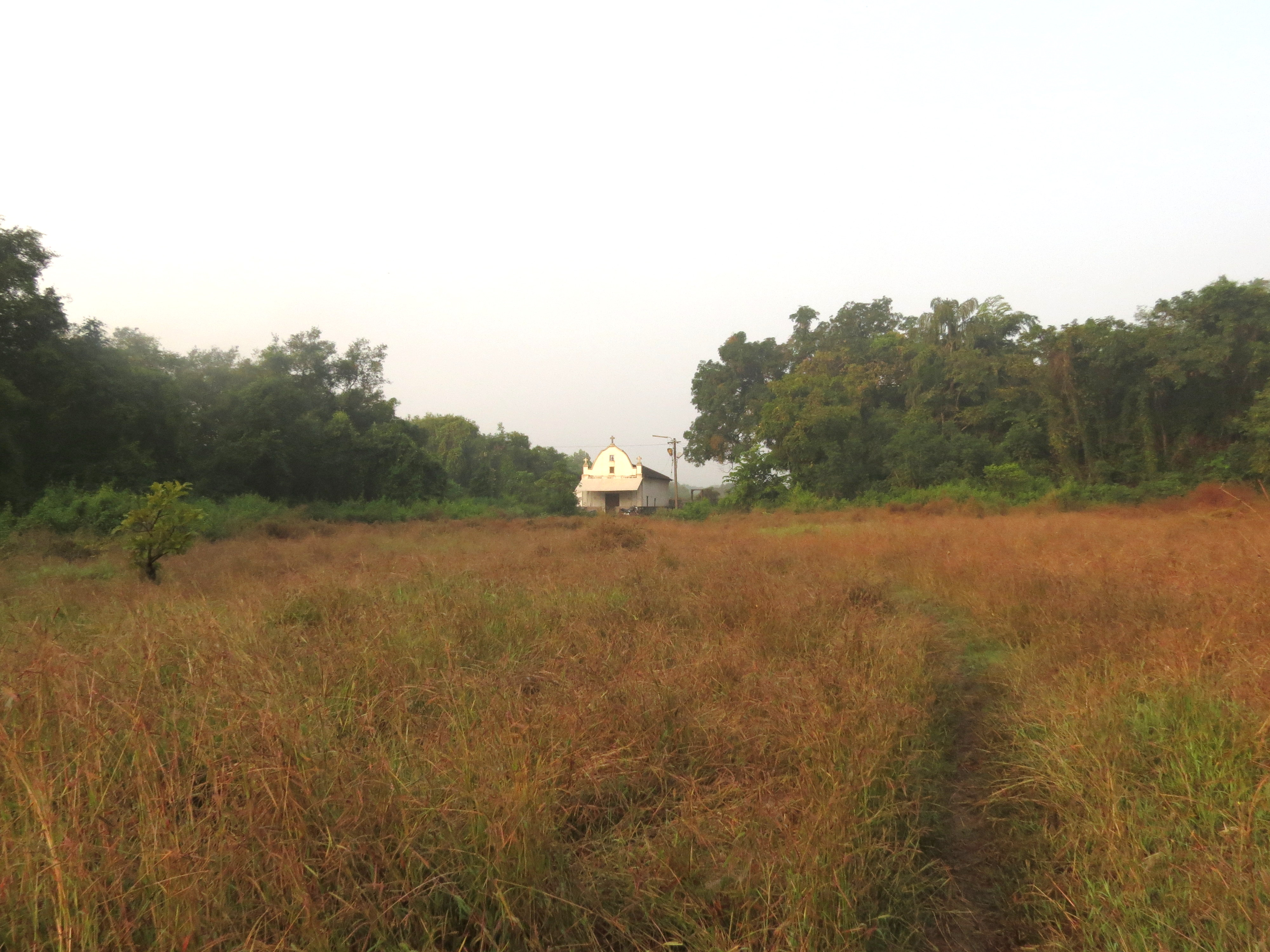
A chapel in Aldona Goa

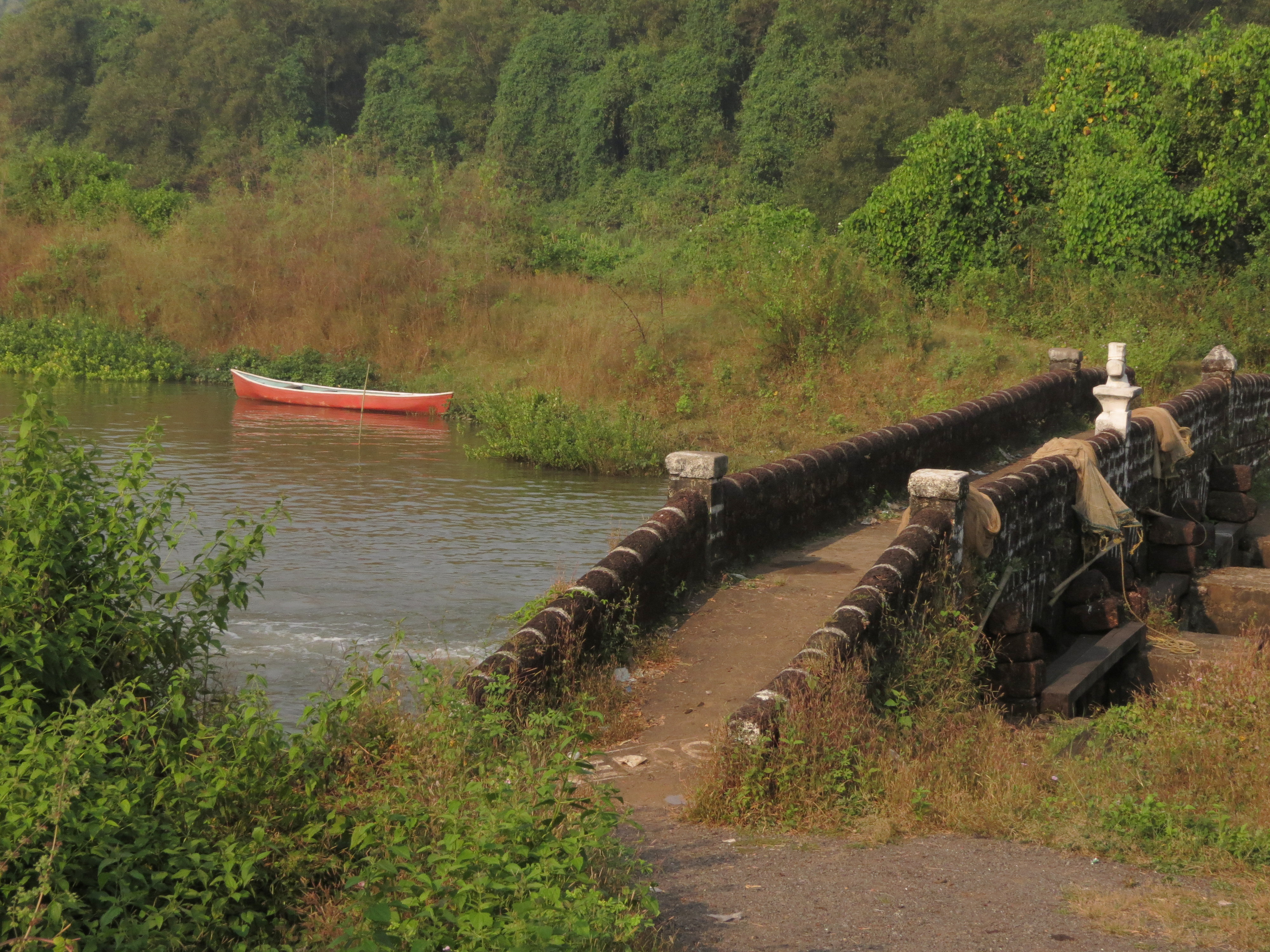
Sluice gate in Aldona Goa for fishing

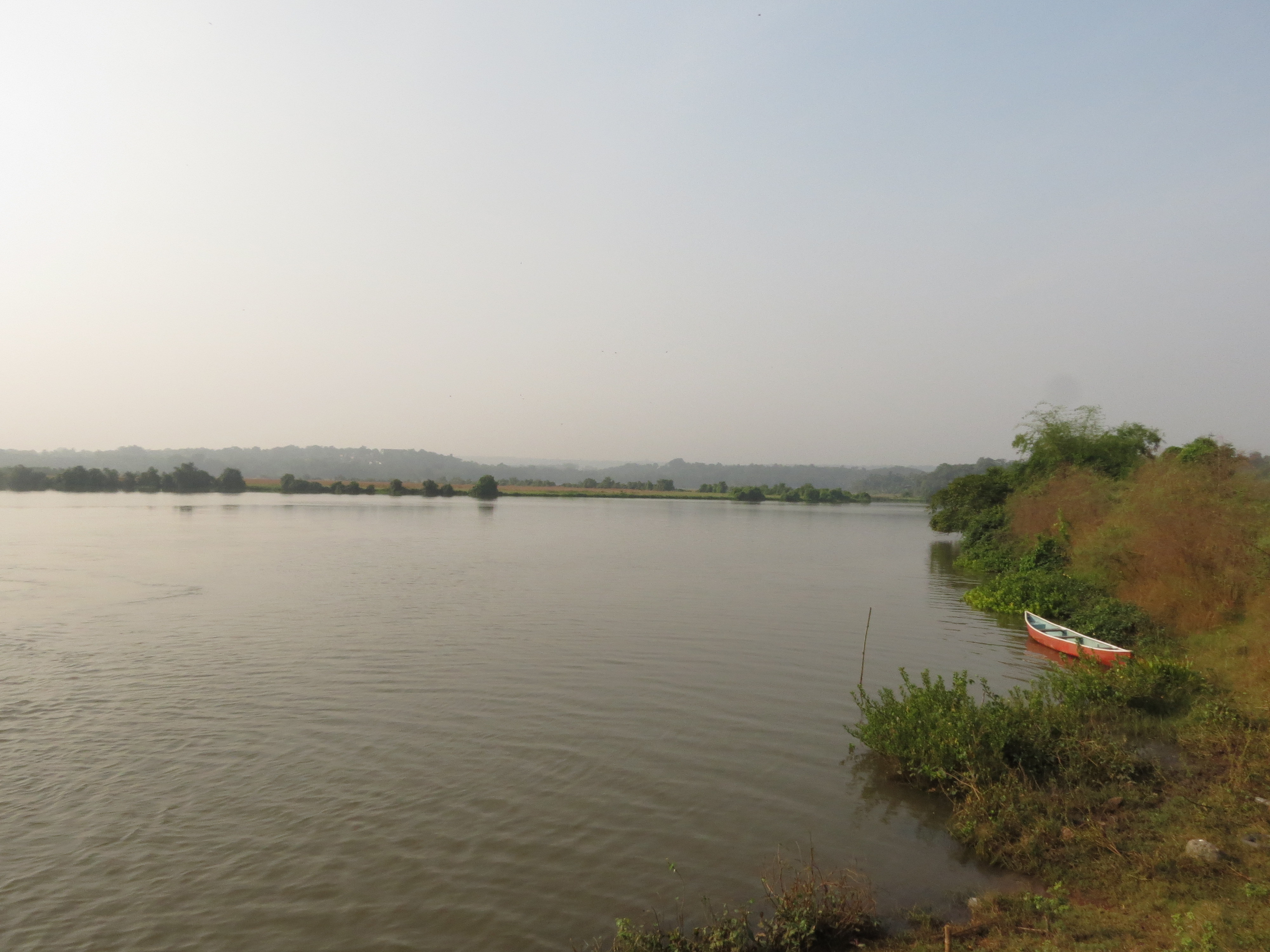
Aldona Goa

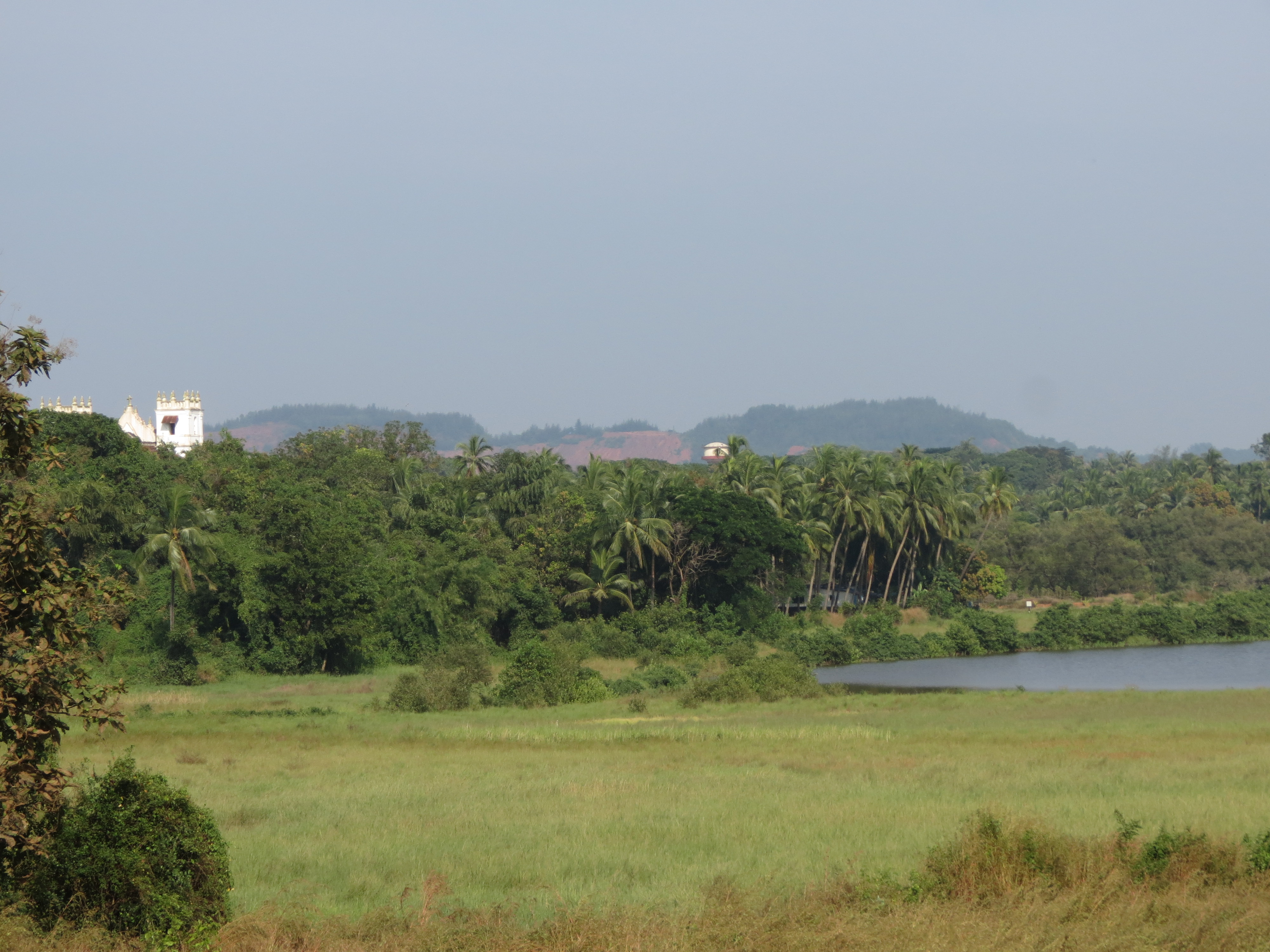
Aldona, Goa

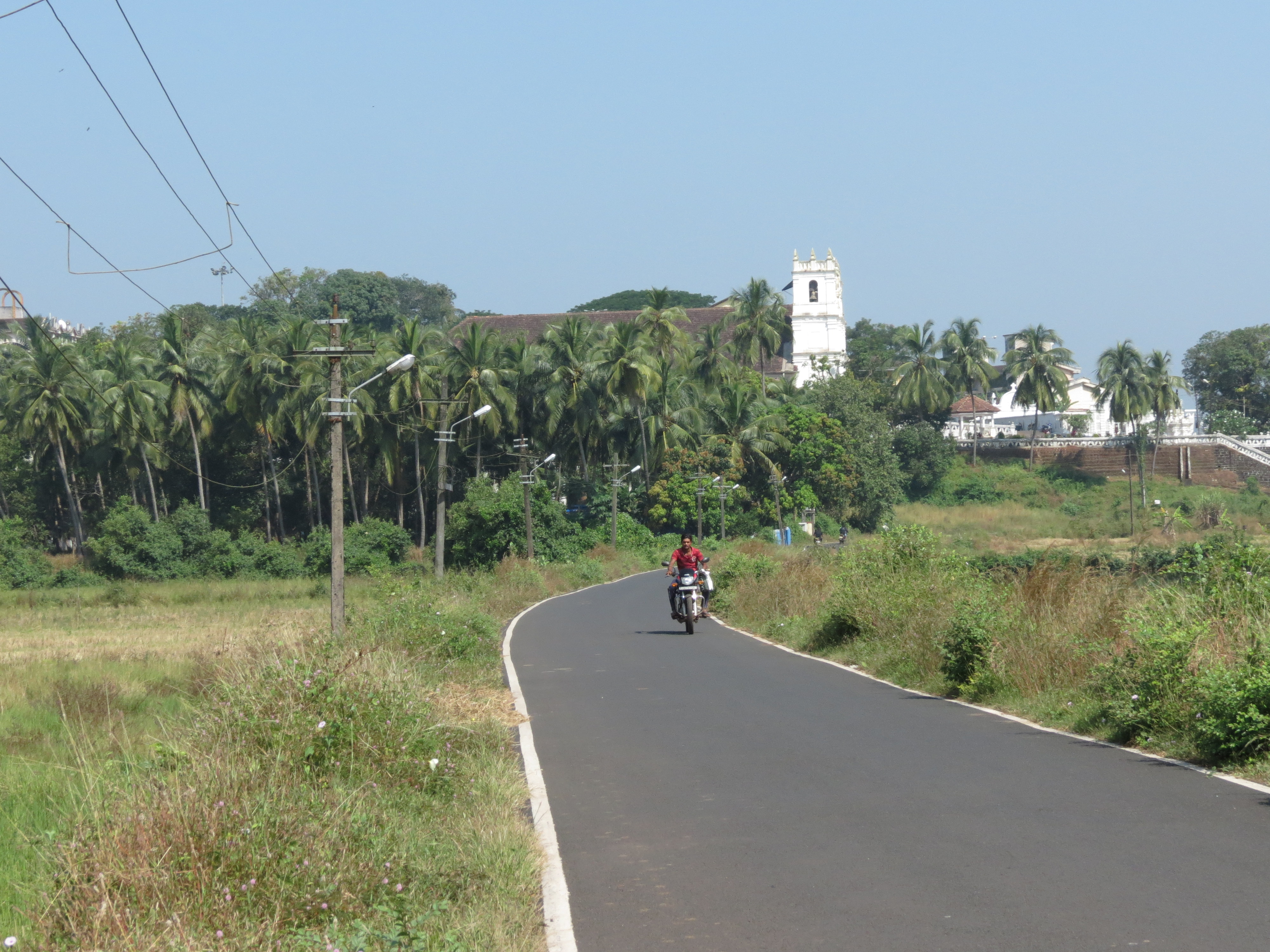
Approach road to St. Thomas church

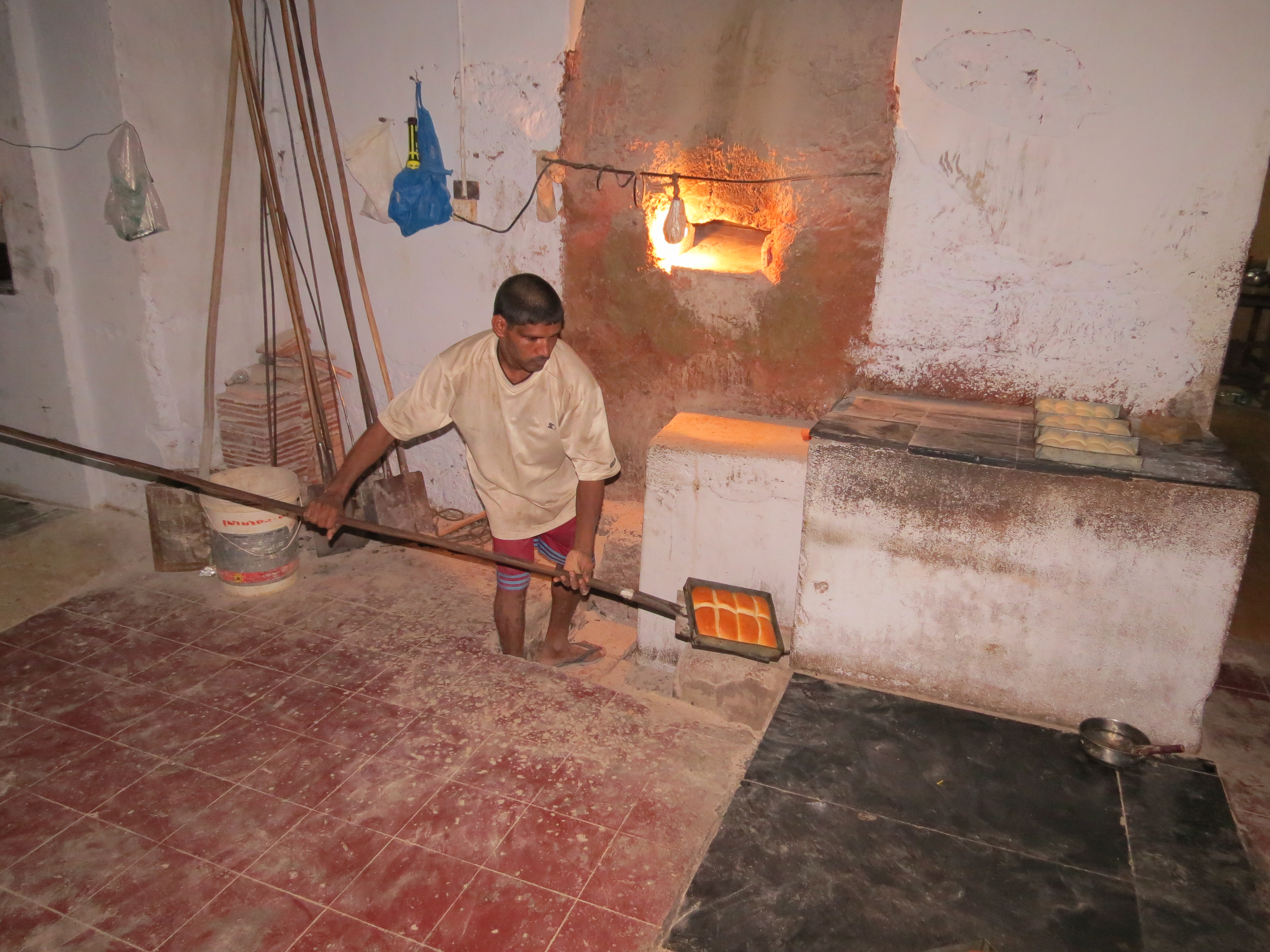
Bread making in Aldona Goa

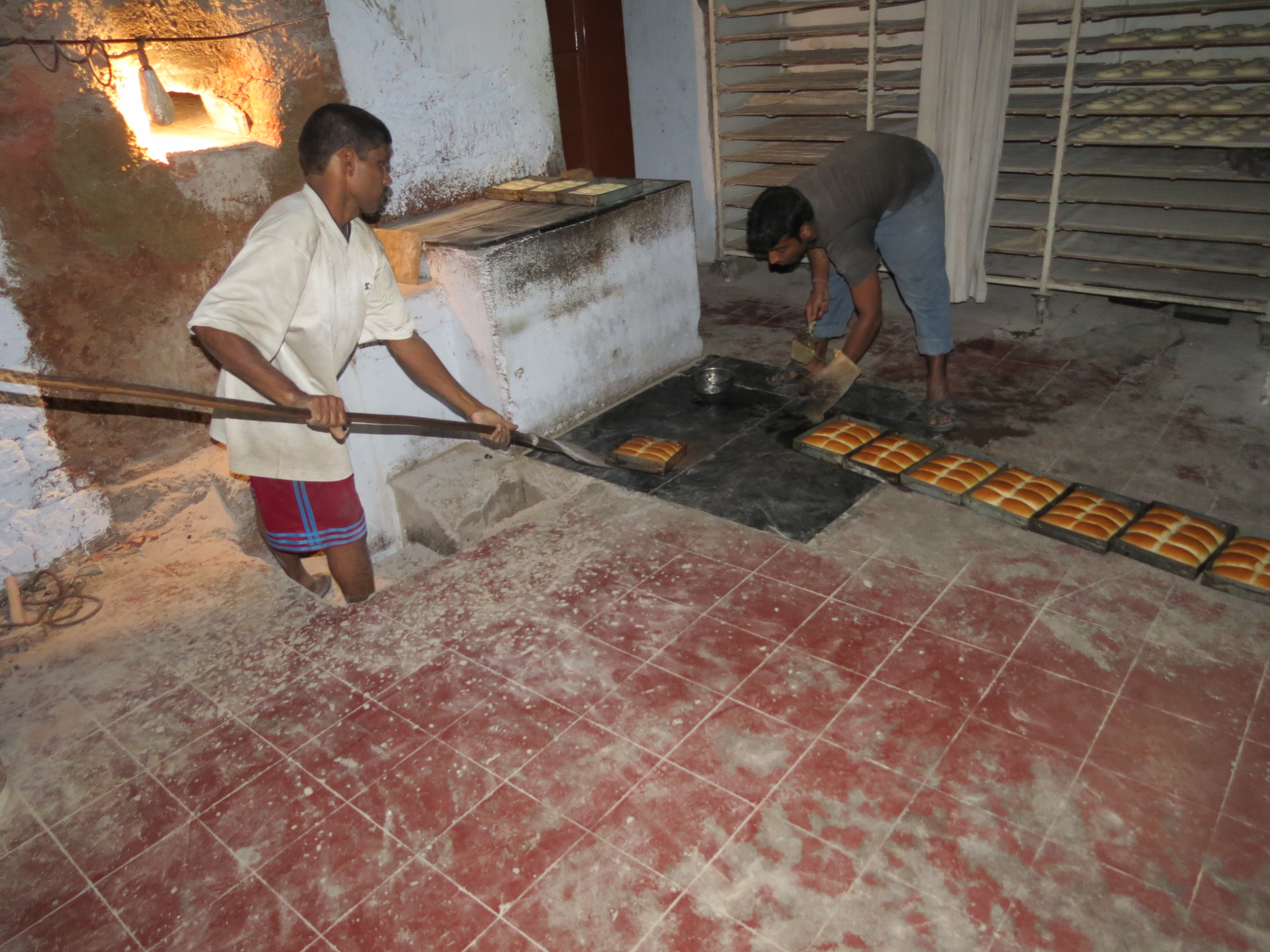
Bread making in Aldona Goa

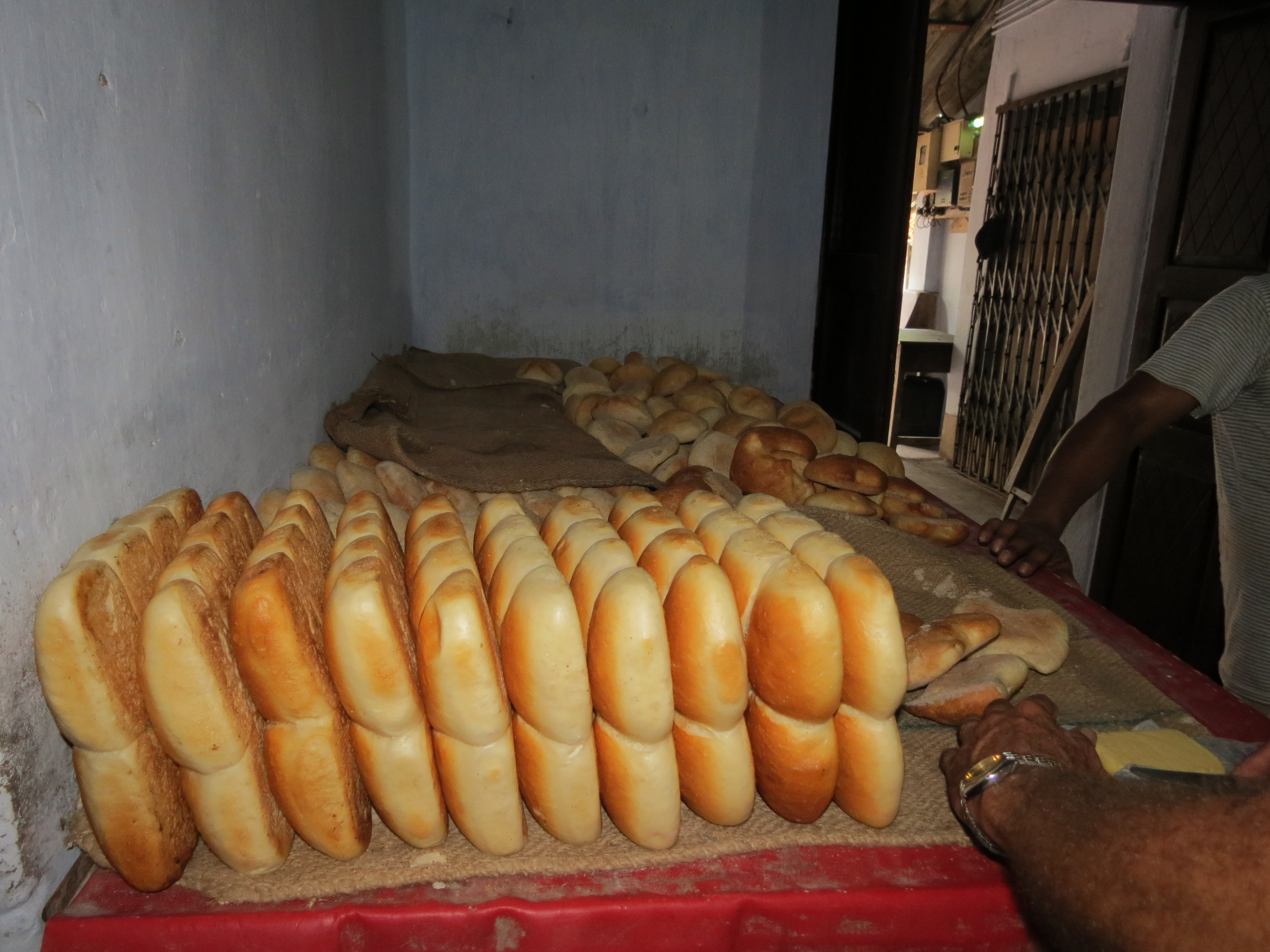
Bread freshly out

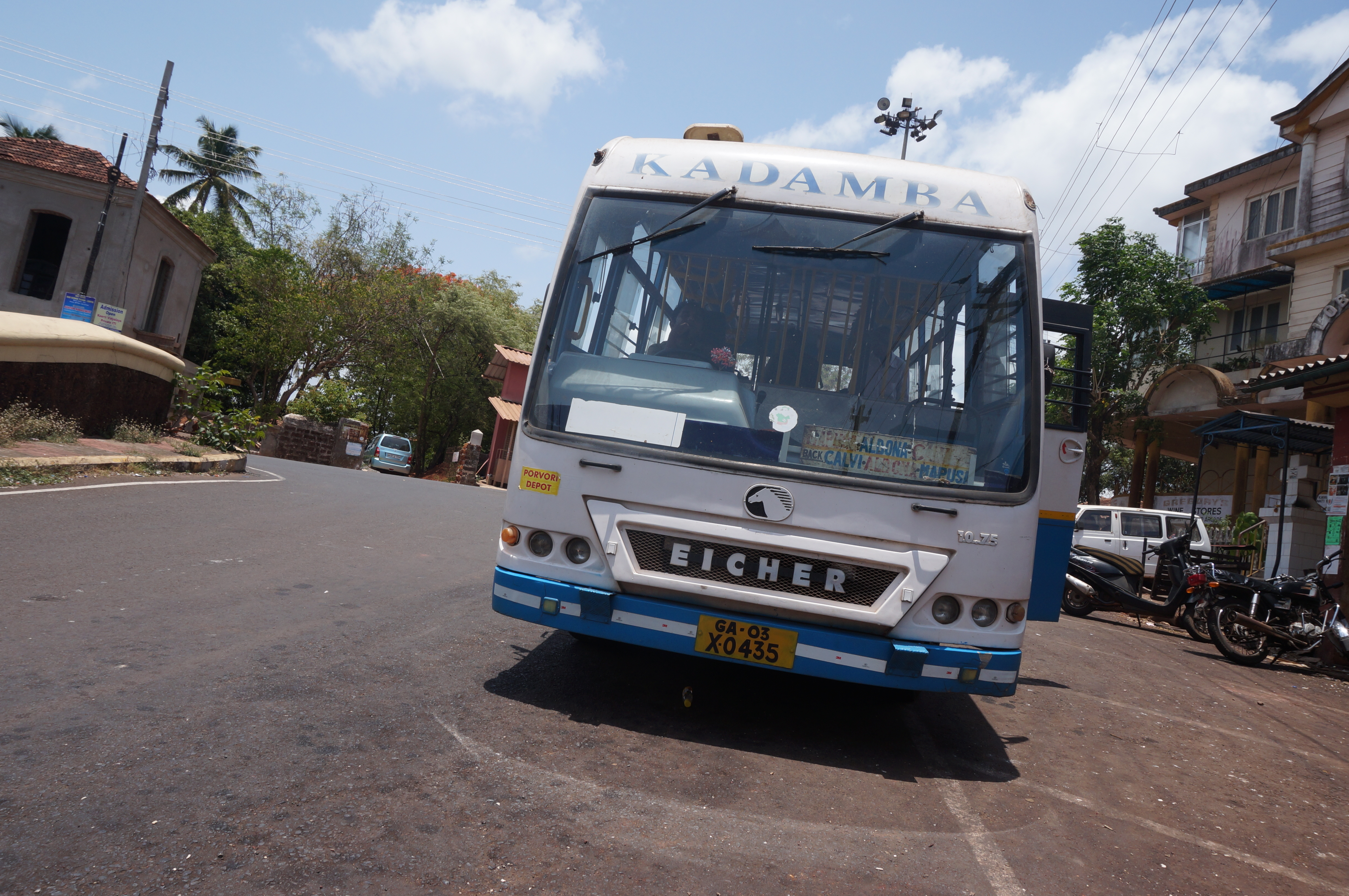
Village bus at Aldona

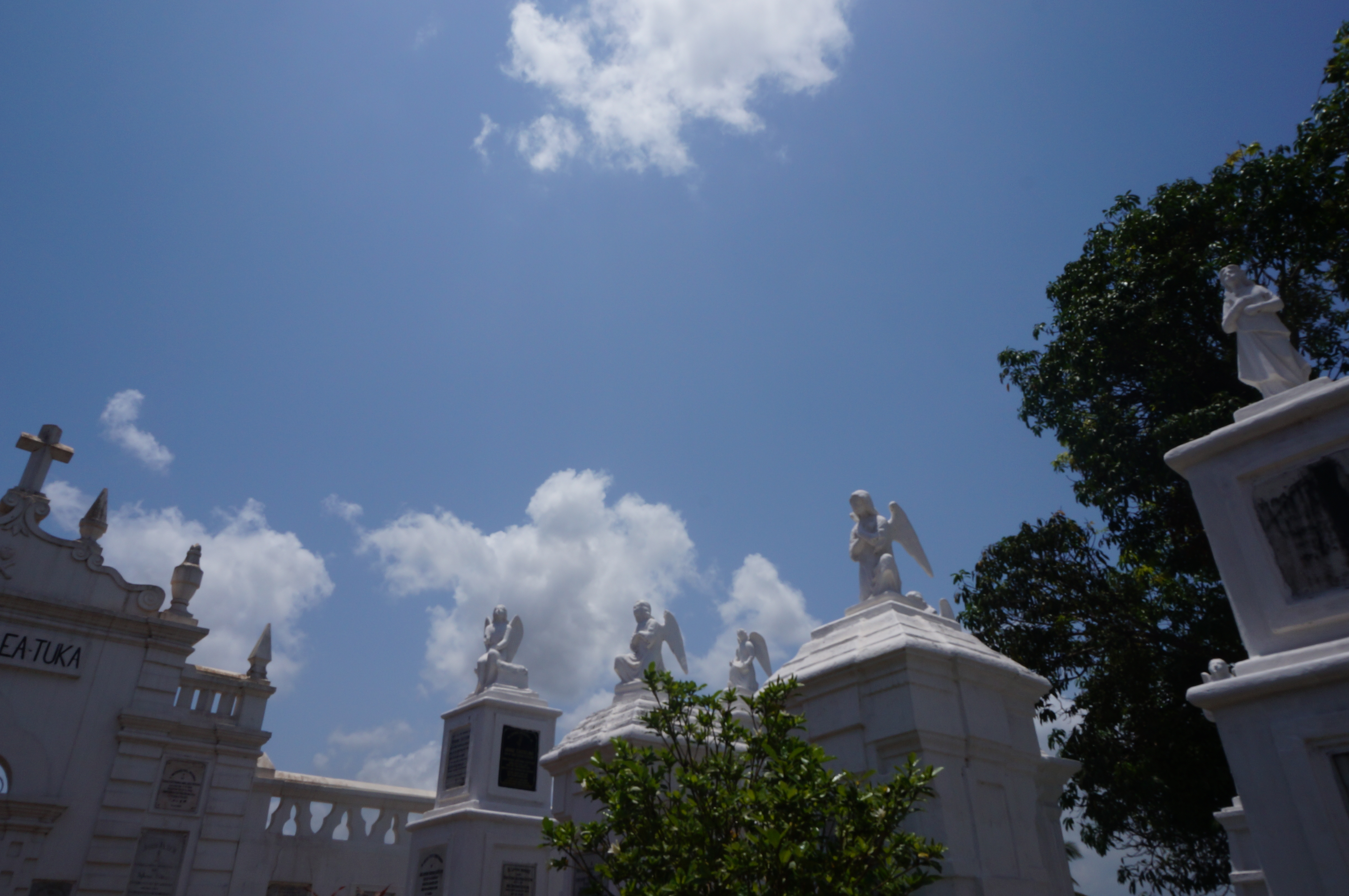
St. Thomas Church Cemetery

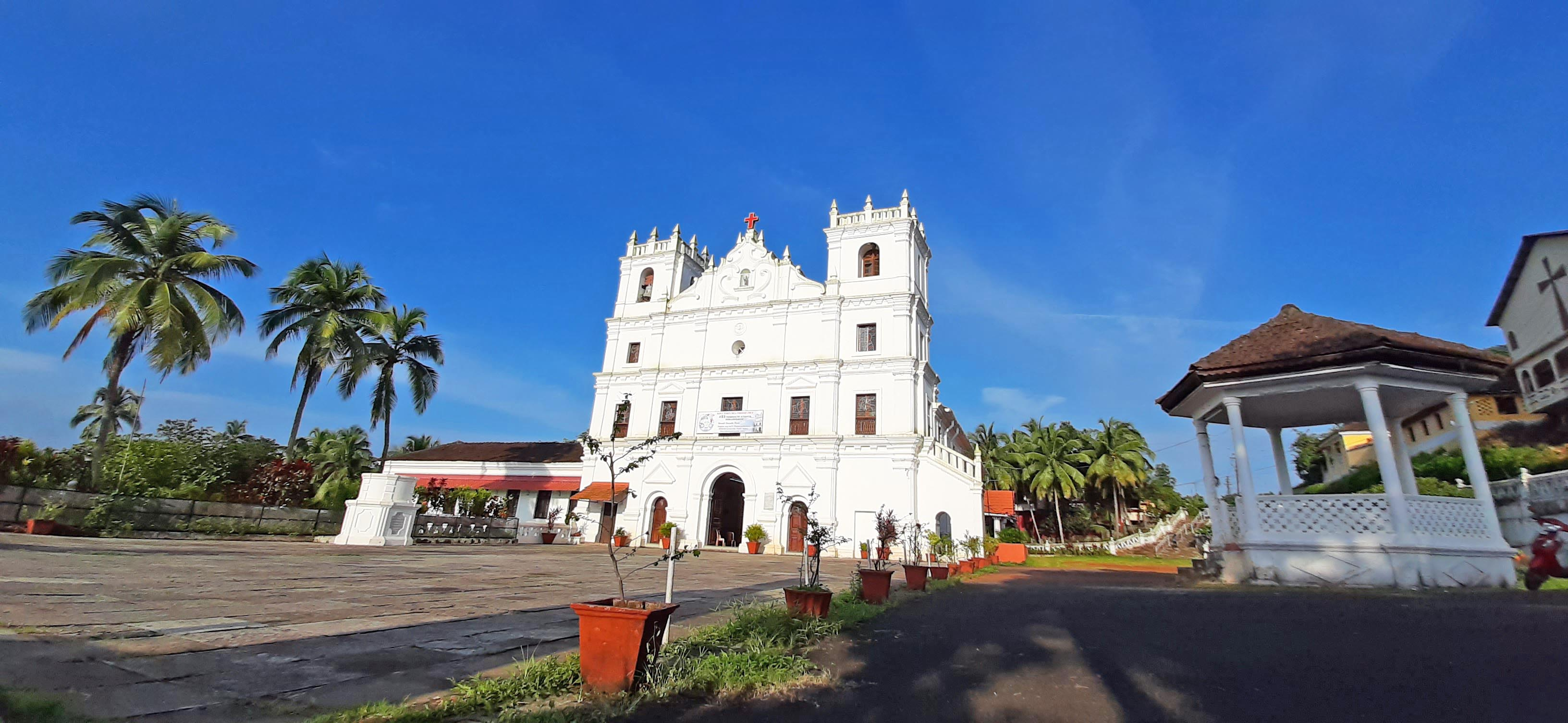
St. Thomas Church Aldona

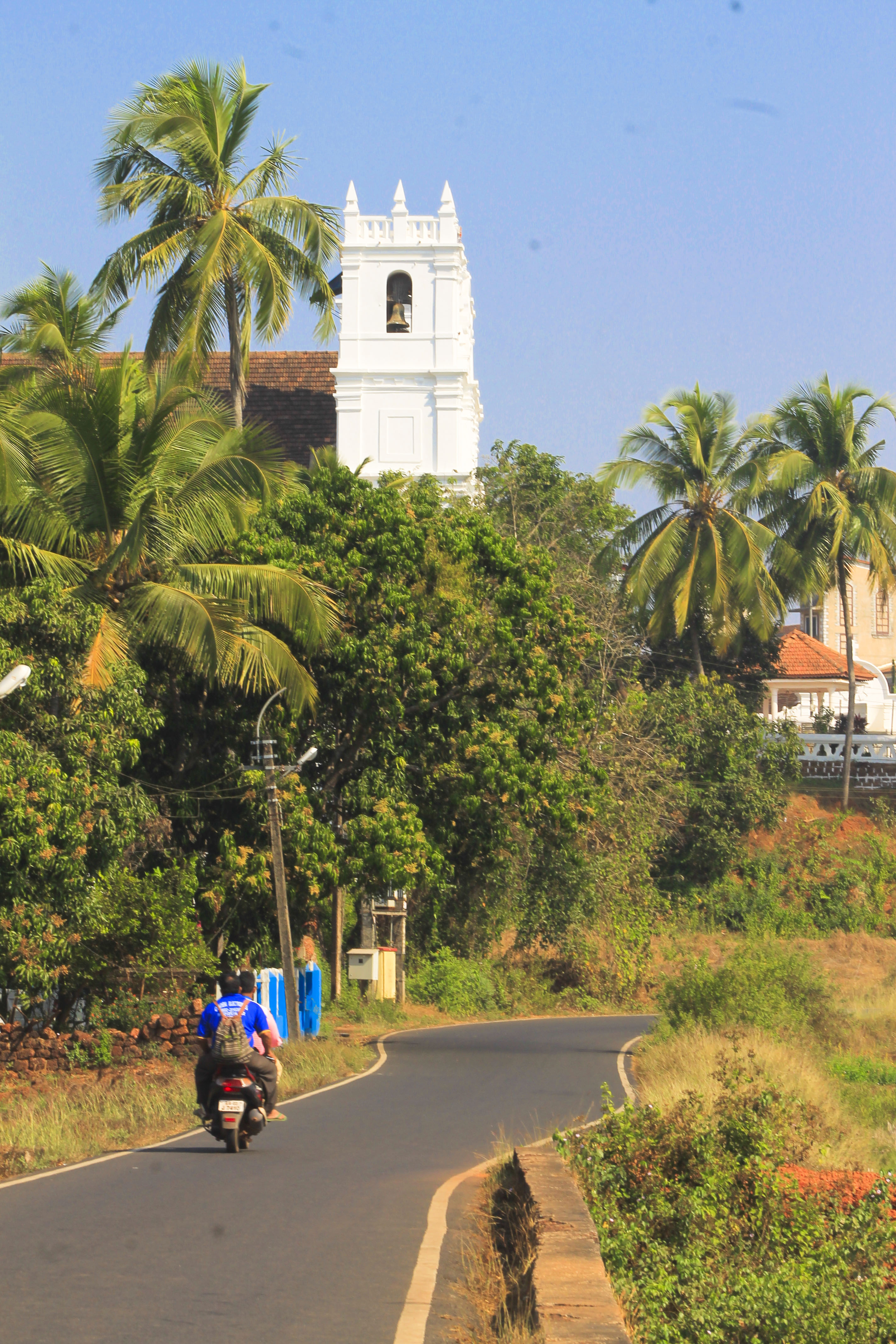
St. Thomas Church Aldona
