= Mapusa River =

Coordinates: 15°30′N 73°51′E

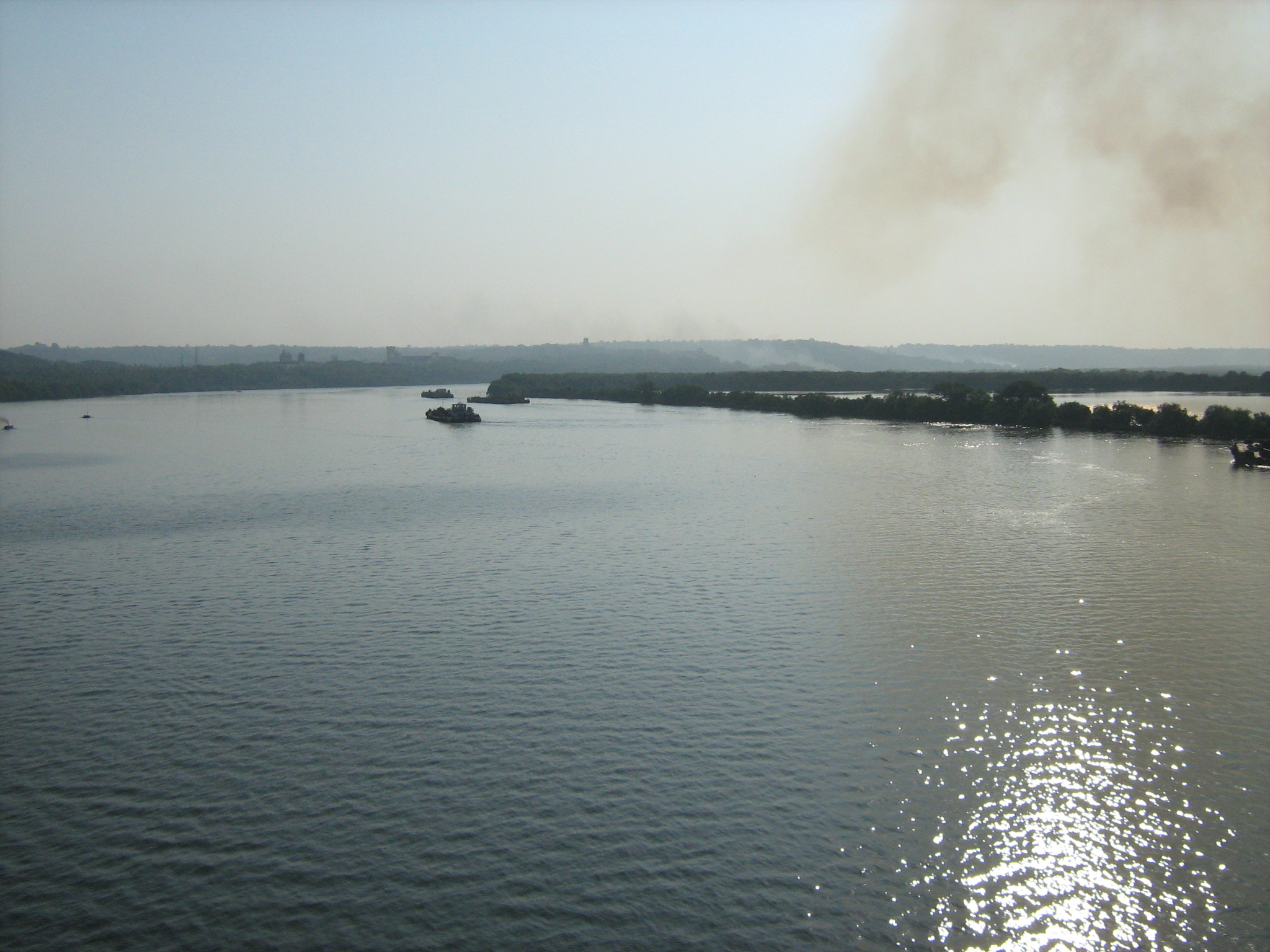
- Native name: Rio de Mapuça (Portuguese)

Location
- Country: India
- Cities: Mapusa, Aldona

Physical characteristics
- Source: Dumacem, Amthane
  - location: Bardez, India
- Mouth: River Mandovi
  - location: India
  - elevation: 0 m (0 ft)
- Discharge
  - location: mouth

Mapusa River (Rio de Mapuça) is one of the main tributaries of the River Mandovi in Goa, India. The river originates from the jungles of Dumacem and Amthane, meanders eastward and then southward before it drains itself in the Mandovi river at Penha de France. Mapusa River has separated Corjuem from mainland Aldona. The Assonora River is the main tributary of Mapusa River. It is situated 12 km from the mapusa city which is a capital of the Bardez taluka and is one of the largest towns of Goa. It flows 20 kilometres in western direction. Penha de Franca church is situated on the junction of the River Mapusa and River Mandovi. Mapusa is the largest town located on the banks of the river.

== Tributaries ==
Western tributaries

Surla river starts flowing from the western ghats of the Maharashtra and In Goa it originates at the surla forests. It gain the flow of stream at the sattari region in where the Mandrichi and deuchi rivers join. Ragoda River is originated in the elevations of Western Ghats.

Eastern and Southern Tributaries

In the high lands of Guirim the Moide River Stream originates. It makes a journey of 17 kilometres till which it joins the Main stream. Kotrachi nadi begins from the forests of Golali and it joins the main river at the sattari region.

Small Streams like patwal, zarme, Advoi, kothodem and kumbhtol also join the Mapusa river.

== History ==
The river since ancient times been used a popular waterway to transport agricultural products and spices which developed the Mapusa City. It was the major Inland streams. The River was a main way to import the essentials to the region. The mapusa became a region of trade market. It is no longer a main transpiration river due to the clogging of the urban wastage nearby. The wastage made living harder to the marine life.

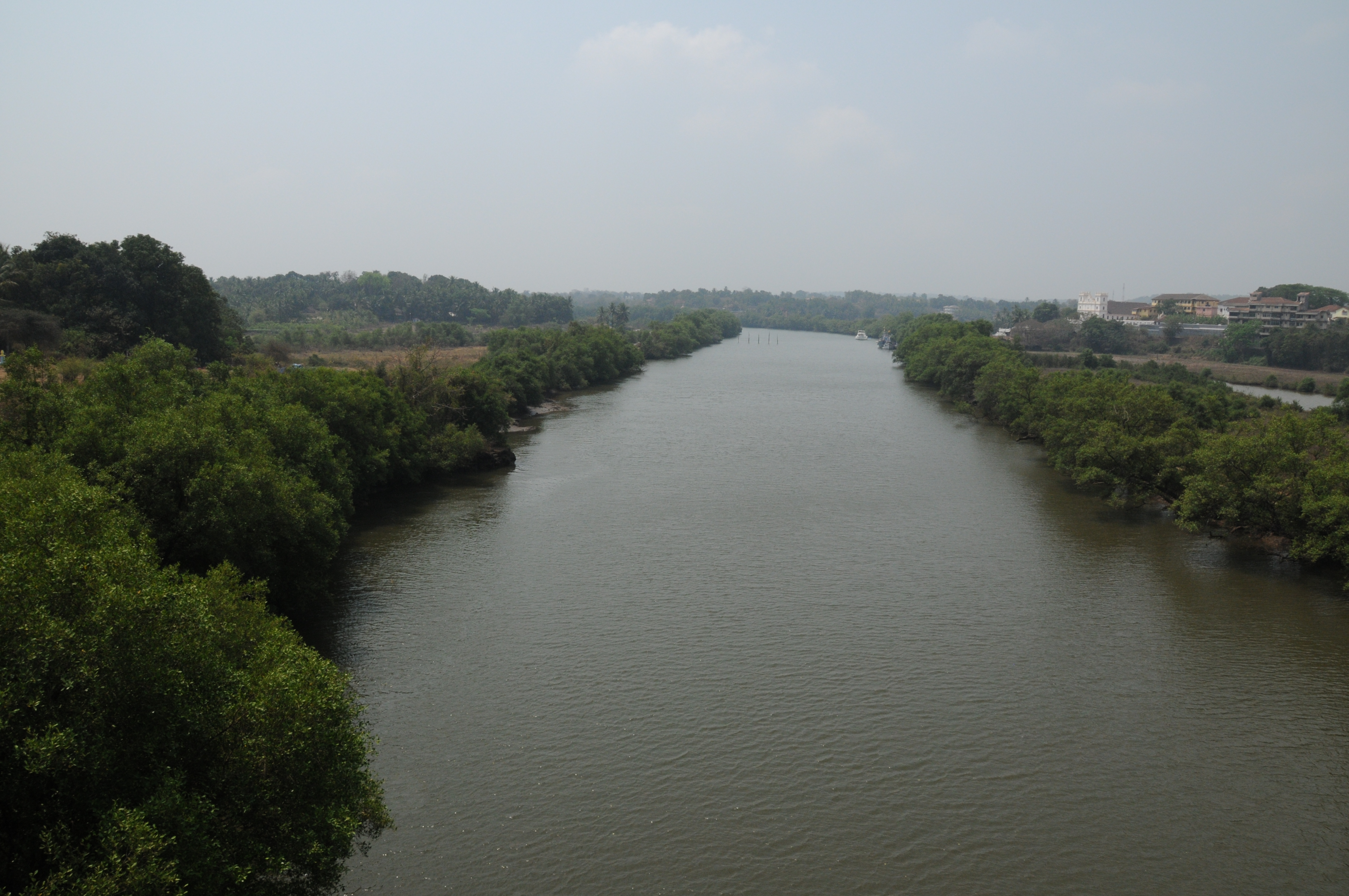
View of Mapusa River tributary
