= Corjuem Fort =

Fortress in Goa, India

- Forte da Assunção de Corjuem
- Part of Goa
- Bardez, Goa
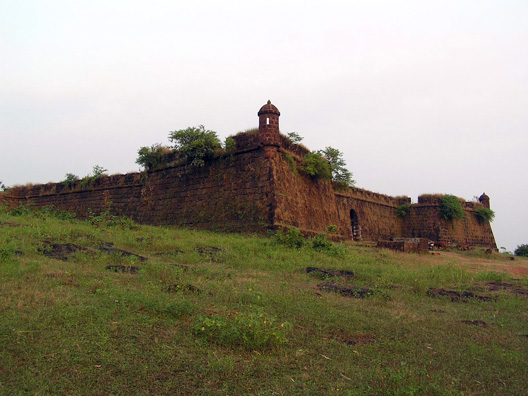
- Aerial view of the fortress

Site information
- Type: Fortress battery
- Controlled by: Portuguese India (1705–1961); India (1961–present)
- Open to the public: Yes
- Condition: Under Restoration
- Website: corjuemisland.com

Location
- Location of Corjuem Fort in Goa
- Location within Goa
- Coordinates: 15.5968°N 73.8928°E

Site history
- Built: 1705
- Built by: Caetano de Melo e Castro
- In use: Decommissioned in 1834
- Demolished: No

Fort Assunção or Corjuem Fort is a fortress situated 4 kilometres (2.5 mi) from the village of Aldona on the river island of Corjuem, Goa. It was a military fortress for the defense of Portuguese India. It is smaller than the other forts in Goa, but it gives a good view of the surrounding river and land. It is a protected monument under the Goa, Daman and Diu Ancient Monuments and Archaeological Sites and Remains Act.

Corjuem Fort is 12 kilometres (7.5 mi) from Panjim.

== Location ==
Corjuvem fort (inside view)

The Fort of Corjuem (Portuguese: Forte de Corjuem) is situated on an island with the same name in Bardez, to the east of the village of Aldona, from which it is separated by the Mapuçá River (a tributary of the Mandovi). It is one of the only two inland forts that are surviving that are made of pitted laterite.

== History ==
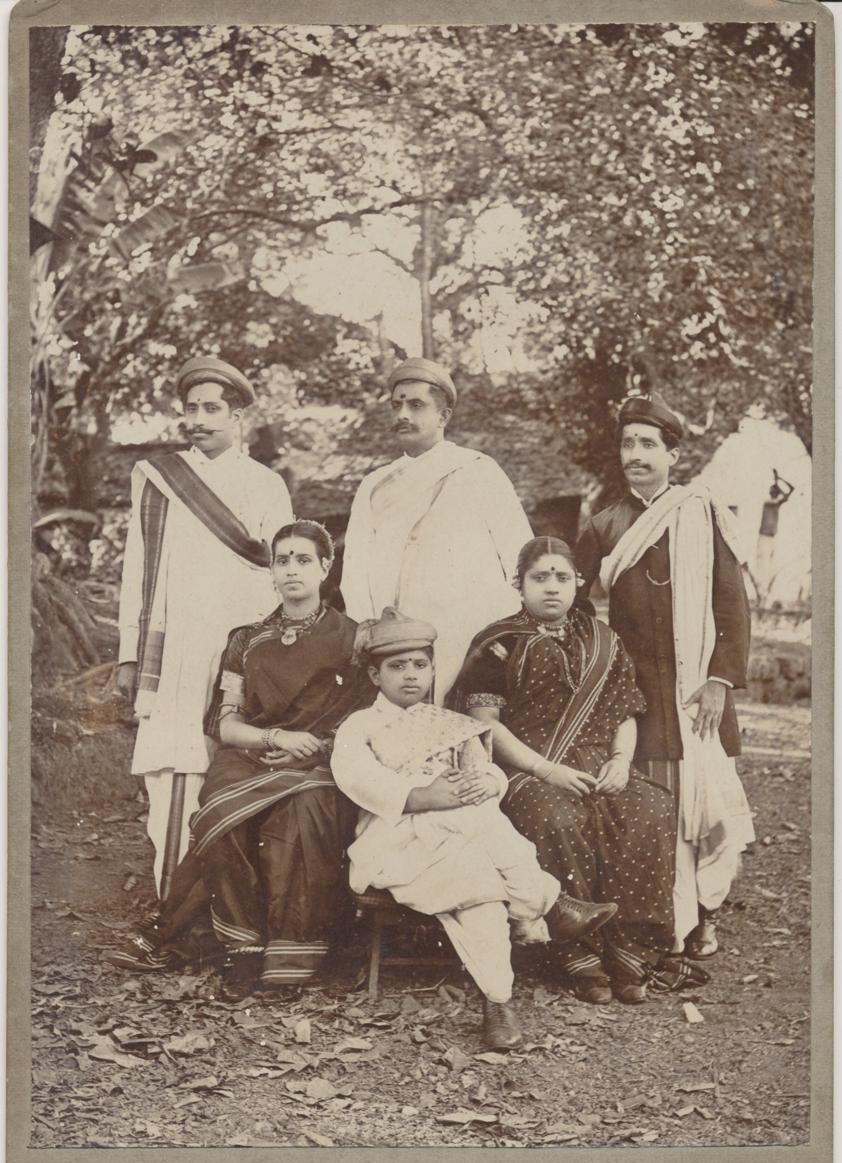
Ferreira family of Corjuem, including famous composer and lawyer Adv. Carlos Ferreira, Adv. Jose Heliodoro Ferreira, Dr. Jose Filippe Alvares and Dr. Armando Ferreira Alvares.

Under the Portuguese Viceroy Caetano de Mello e Castro, the control of the island came back under Portuguese India's administration. This fort built in 1705, by the Portuguese, as a defense against Maratha aggression, and was subsequently rebuilt and reinforced by them to boost up defenses along Panjim. In the eighteenth century, this fort successfully protected the Portuguese from rival kingdoms, who were camped just beyond the Mandovi River.

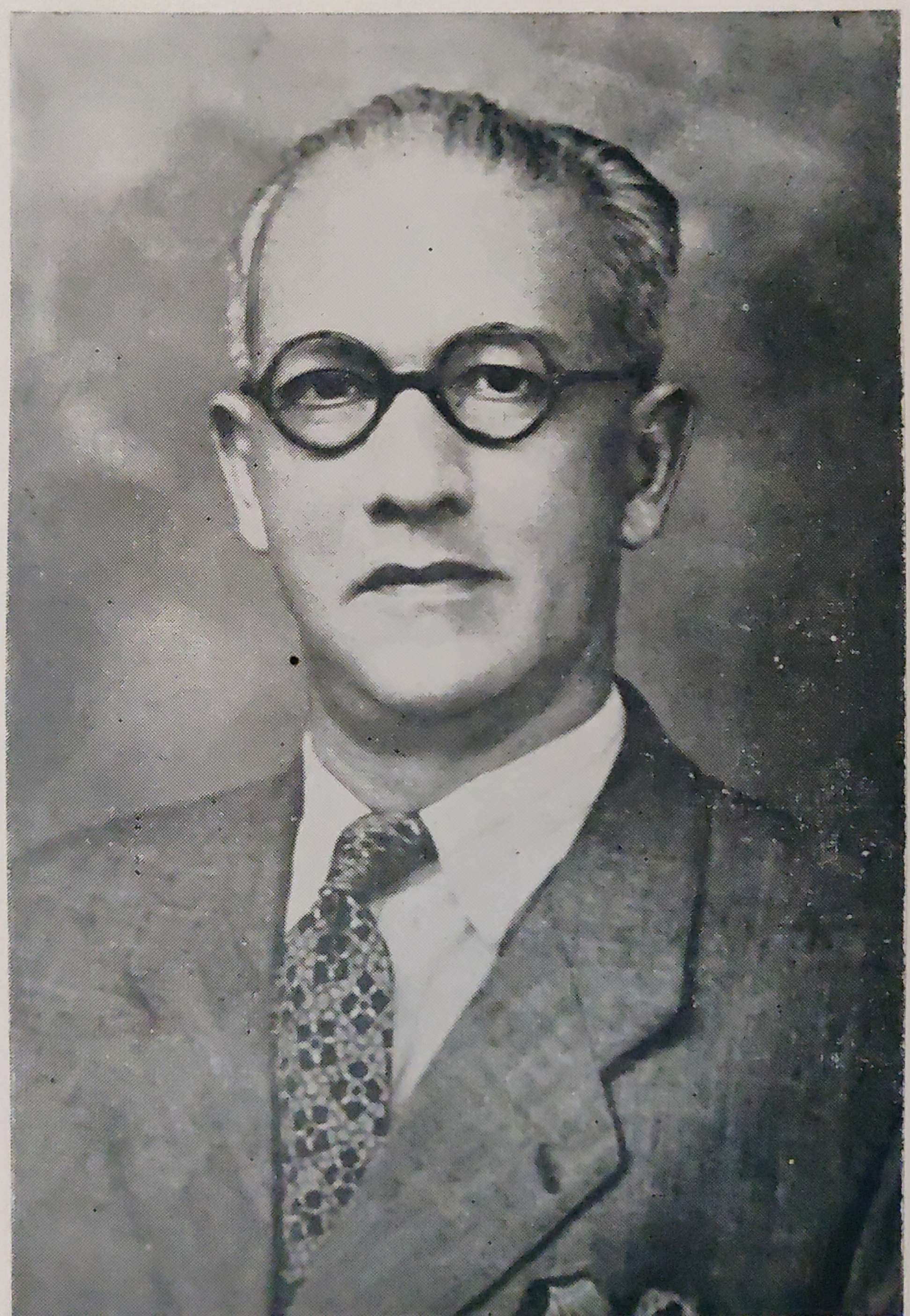
Jaime Valfredo Rangel, Industrialist, politician and owner of Corjuem Fort

In the early 1800s, the fort was used as a Military School and had in its defenses a battery of four guns. The fortress defended the town of Corjuem and also has a chapel under the parochial church of Aldona. The fort fell into disuse after the success of Novas Conquistas, as it had lost its purpose as a border defense.

== Development of Corjuem ==
Since the early 1800s the custodian of the island and Fort have been Joao Filippe Ferreira and his descendants. He also installed the altar of St. Anthony in the Fort. His family was influential in the construction of the 5 chapels and 3 temples in the village as well as being the benefactors of the Corjuem Gymkhana and the Mae de Deus School Corjuem. They developed the island post 1961, working with the authorities on roads, electrification and both the bridges.

Corjuem which was earlier just a ward of Aldona with no separate parish, first considered as a separate village in the Census of 1971 with 467 people, now has over 2,700 and comes under the Aldona Panchayat.

The Fort is currently under restoration by the Directorate of Archaeology Govt of Goa with backing from the Alvares Ferreira and Ferreira Rangel families.

== Folklore ==
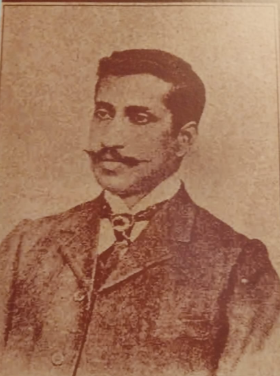
Adv. Carlos Eugenio Ferreira, the most famous son of Corjuem

The fort also has an interesting incident in which an ambitious Portuguese woman named Ursula e Lancastre, who determined to see the man's world, dressed as a male and took up navigation and military roles. She landed up at Corjuem as a soldier and many years later, voluntarily revealed her gender as she wished to marry a man.

The famous Dekhni song Hanv Saiba Poltoddi Voitam" by Carlos Eugenio Ferreira, grandson of Joao Fillipe Ferreira was written about crossing the river near Corjuem Fort

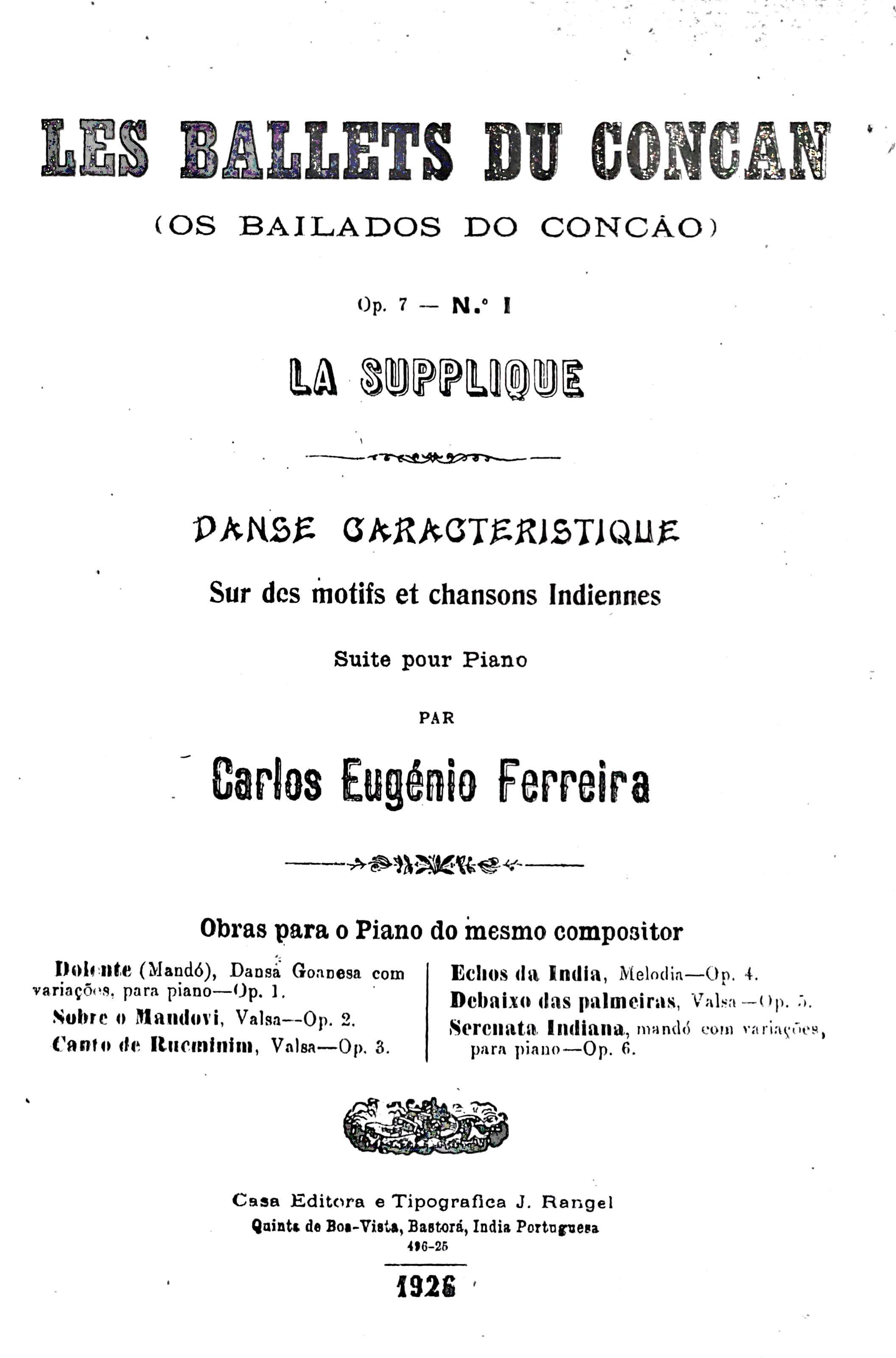
Hanv Saiba Poltoddi Voitam composed by Carlos Eugenio Ferreira Goa's most famous Dekhni song

== Santuário de Santo António de Lisboa ==
There is a Shrine dedicated to St. Anthony within the walls of the fort, at its entrance. It is owned by the Parish of Aldona and is regularly patronized and renovated.

The shrine has been a site of devotion for almost 200 years, since its installation by Adv. Ferreira. There is a tradition for the villagers to walk from the chapel of the village, Mae de Deus to the altar at the Fort in years of poor rainfall, praying to St. Anthony for rain. This has been witnessed latest in 2026, during the 2026 El Nino.
