= Jaime Valfredo Rangel =

Portuguese medical practitioner and diplomat (1897–1959)

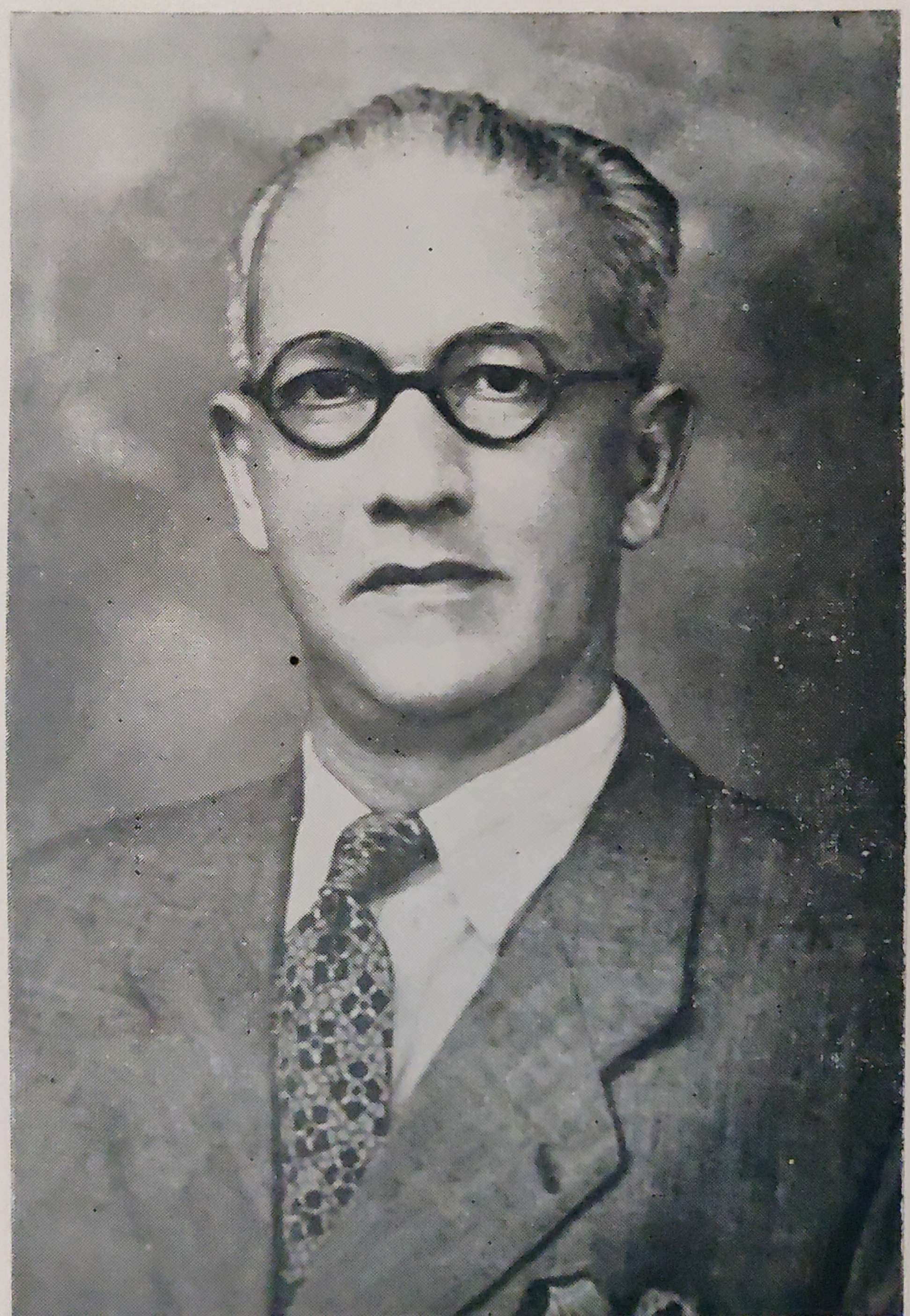
- Rangel in 1943
- Born: Francisco Newton João Vicente da Piedade Jaime Valfredo Rangel; 13 February 1897; Bastora, Goa, Portuguese India
- Died: 6 July 1959 (aged 62); Bangalore, Karnataka, India
- Education: Escola Medico–Cirurgica de Goa
- Spouse: Maria Filomena Frias Ferreira (m. 1921)
- Children: 7
- Scientific career
- Fields: Medicine, Portuguese literature, politics
- Workplaces: Escola Medico–Cirurgica de Goa; Tipografia Rangel

Francisco Newton João Vicente da Piedade Jaime Valfredo Rangel (13 February 1897 – 6 July 1959) was a Goan industrialist, medical practitioner, philanthropist, politician, and one of the main developers of Corjuem Island.

Throughout the course of his career as the owner and director of Tipografia Rangel (Rangel Printing Press), Rangel was responsible for the publication of thousands of books important to Portuguese literature and Goan literature and publication of Portuguese newspaper O Independente and the archives of Goa Medical College (then known as the Arquivos da Escola Medico Cirurgica de Nova Goa) for which he was the editor. Tipografia Rangel was one of the first private printing presses in Portuguese India and was a leader in the publishing of Portuguese literature in Portuguese India prior to the Indian Liberation of Goa in 1961.

== Early life ==
Jaime Valfredo Rangel was born in Bastora, Bardes, Portuguese Goa to Goan Catholic parents. He was the eldest son of the Vicente Joao Janin Rangel, founder of Tipografia Rangel, and Augusta Udobildes Correia Lobo e Rangel. His father, originally from Piedade, Goa moved to Bastora, Goa and founded Tipografia Rangel in 1886. Jaime excelled in languages and was a polyglot highly proficient in English, Konkani, Portuguese, Latin and French. He completed his matriculation from University of Bombay in 1915 and graduated as a medical doctor from Escola Medico–Cirurgica de Nova Goa (which subsequently became known as Goa Medical College) in 1922 in Panjim where he was the editor of the Arquivos da Escola Medico–Cirurgica de Nova Goa which he continued to publish even post the completion of his medical studies. Prior to completing his medical degree he was a teacher of Portuguese at Sacred Heart of Jesus in Parra, Goa. After completing his degree, he took his place as a director of the family business Tipografia Rangel.

== Director of Tipografia Rangel ==
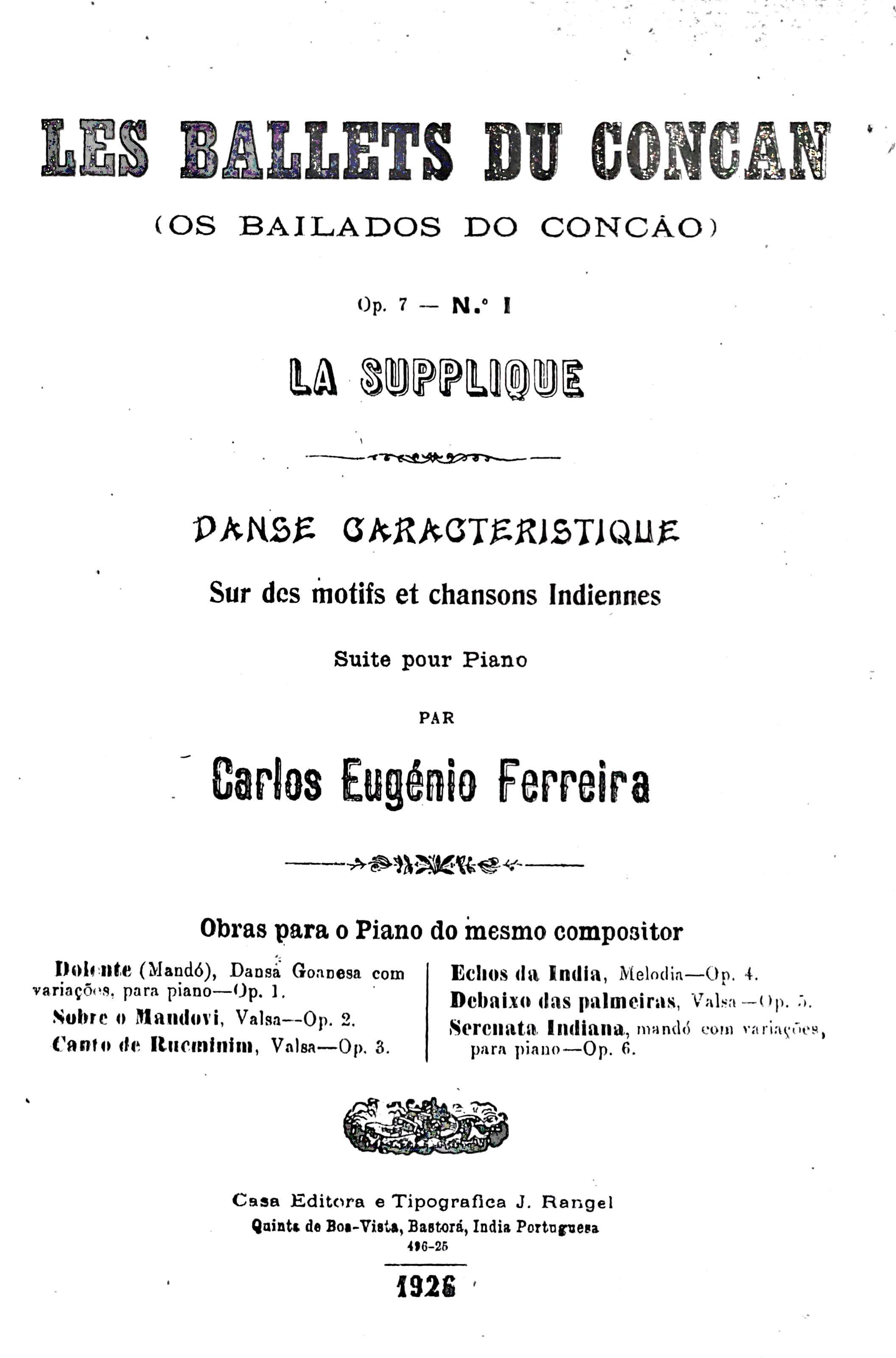
Hanv Saiba Poltoddi Voitam composed by Carlos Eugenio Ferreira Goa's most famous Dekhni song

During Rangel's time as head of the publication house did his business and literature in Goa flourish. The Press published work in English, Konkani, French and Portuguese. He took up responsibility of printing Boletim do Instituto Vasco da Gama and this was subsequently renamed as Boletim Instituto Menezes Braganza, the bulletin of one of the premier institutions for cultural activities in Goa since the 19th century. Rangel was also deeply involved in the scientific press of Portuguese India at the time publishing five periodicals in the medical field including the Arquivos da Escola Medico–Cirurgica de Goa and that had been established by Froilano de Mello and Boletim Geral De Medicina, an instruction for all doctors in Portuguese India. The publication house was one of the largest in Goa publishing a total of 17 periodicals at the time including O Independente and O Indespensavel that were also created and edited by the Rangel family. His publications made him well known and his publication house synonymous for literature published in Goa at the time. In 1926 Tipografia Rangel published Hanv Saiba Poltodi Vetam by Carlos Eugenio Ferreira, which would become one of the most famous Dekhni songs in Goa and be adapted by Raj Kapoor as Na mangoon sona chandi in his Hindi movie Bobby. They continued to publish the work of this artist during his lifetime. Rangel also authored and published a book Imprensa em Goa in 1957 a description of the history and state of the media in Portuguese India during the Portuguese rule of Goa which continues to be used a reference for the state of the colonial media.

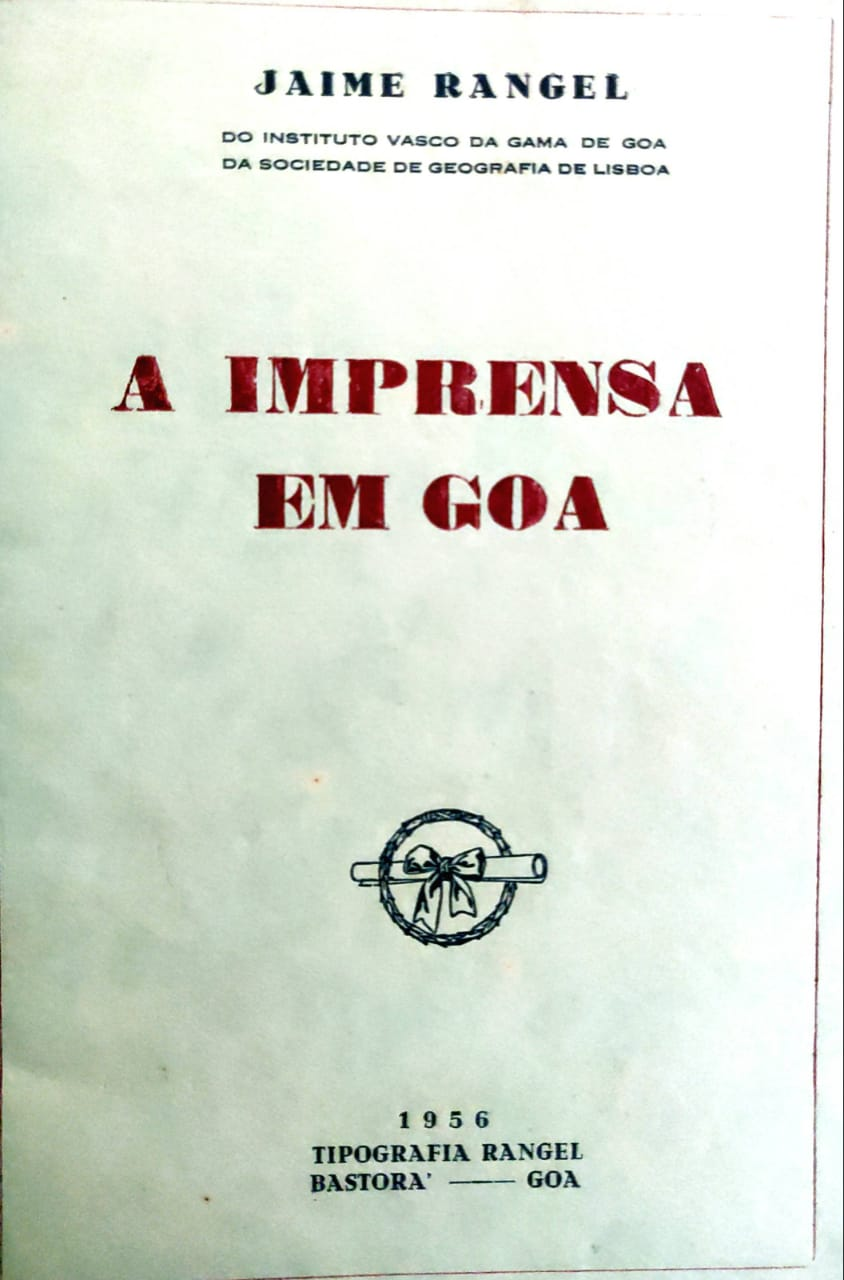
Jaime Valfredo Rangel's study on the colonial media in Goa

== Political career ==
Rangel was elected as a councillor of the Municipal Council of Bardes in 1929 and appointed as the President of the council in April 1940, a position which he held till 1949. As President of the Municipal Council of Bardez Rangel took significant efforts for development and beautification projects at headquarters of the municipality Mapusa where he built roads and gardens including the first concrete road in Mapusa which is still active. He also renovated the Asilo Hospital in Mapusa further granting the hospital an annual subsidy of Rs.6000 in order for the hospital to start functioning efficiently. He was subsequently appointed by Portuguese Government to be the representative to the International Labour Organization of Portugal. In this position he attended Asia International Labour Conferences in Bandung in 1950, Chennai in 1952, Tokyo in 1953, Bangkok in 1954, Rangoon in 1955 and Delhi in 1957 where he received an audience with the first President of India, Dr Rajendra Prasad.

== Personal life and charitable contributions ==
Rangel was married to Maria Ana Filomena Frias Ferreira, the niece of Carlos Eugenio Ferreira from Corjuem, Goa at the age of twenty four and had seven children. He died while on vacation in Bangalore on 6 July 1959.

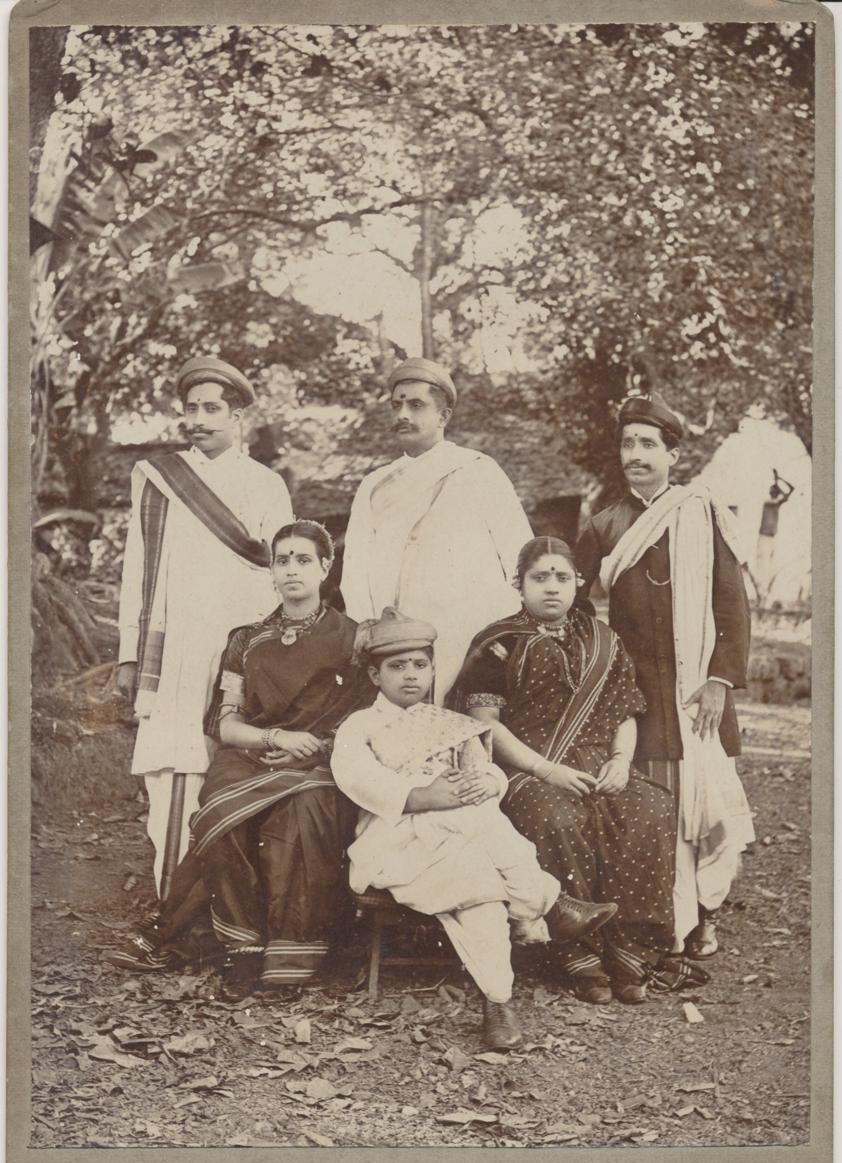
Ferreira family of Corjuem, including the father in law of Dr. Rangel, Jose Heliodoro and Carlos Eugenio

Dr Rangel was a benefactor to many institutions and was a fervent supporter of education for women even donating property owned by him and his family to The Sisters of the Cross of Chavanod on which they started Holy Cross High School, Bastora. Dr Rangel believed in the equality of all and uplifment of Scheduled Castes he donated three acres of his personal land for affordable housing which houses over a 200 people in Corjuem, he also ensured employment and built a culture for uplifment of the community which his family continues to be a benefactor to and where his family continues to be the custodians to the 17th century Fort. He is well known for his work on medical records during the colonial period in India, which have been used subsequently as references for multiple publications about the History of Medicine in that region. Tipografia Rangel continues to be remembered one of the most well-known institutions for Portuguese Literature and Goan Literature in India during the colonial period.

His son Dr Jose Rangel was a poet, author of Toada da Vida e Outros Poemas, Founder Director of the Voicuntrao Dempo Centre for Indo-Portuguese Studies named after co-founder of Dempo Mining Corporation and MP in Portuguese Parliament, Voicuntrao Dempo and part of the executive committee of the United Goans Party as well as succeeding his father as Director of Tipografia Rangel.

== Selected Works Published by Tipografia Rangel ==
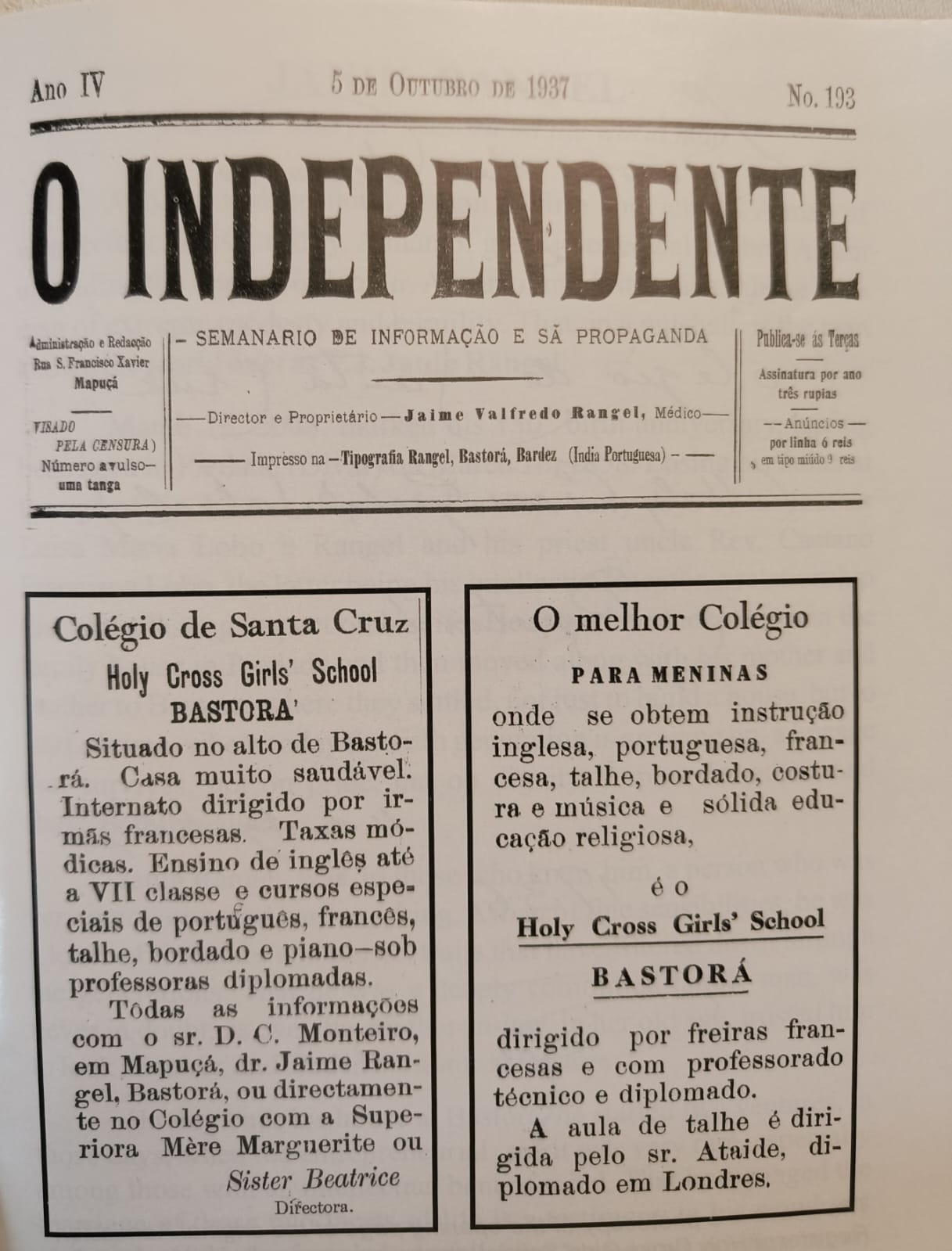
O Independente published by Jaime Valfredo Rangel

- Independente (O) (1933-1945)
- Boletim De Institute Vasco Da Gama (1926-1961)
- Arquivos da Escola Medico Cirurgica de Nova Goa
- Agentes da diplomacia Portuguesa in India, with a preface and notes by Panduronga S. S. Pissurlencar. Bastora Tipografia Rangel, 1952.
- Bosquejo histórico das comunidades, Felippe Neri Xavier (1903-1907)
- Hanv Saiba Poltodi Vetam by Carlos Eugenio Ferreira (1926)
- Etnografia da Índia Portuguesa by A.B de Braganca (1940)
- Colaboradores hindús de Afonso de Albuquerque by Panduronga S. S. Pissurlencar (1941)
- Armandbabache Don Mog: Konkani ani Goem by Manohar Sardessai (1984)
- Gramática da lingua Concani by VJ Janin Rangel (1933)
- A Imprensa em Goa by Jaime Rangel (1957)
