= Indian Information Service =

Government of India civil Service

- Emblem of India

Service Overview
- Abbreviation: IIS
- Formed: 1960; 66 years ago
- Country: India
- Training Grounds: Indian Institute of Mass Communication; Film and Television Institute of India
- Cadre Controlling Authority: Ministry of Information and Broadcasting
- Legal Personality: Governmental: Civil Service
- Association: Indian Information Service Association

Top most post in the cadre
- Principal Director General: Shri Jaideep Bhatnagar (IIS)

Head of the Civil Services
- Cabinet Secretary: T. V. Somanathan (IAS)

The Indian Information Service (IIS) (Hindi: भारतीय सूचना सेवा) is the central civil service under Group A and Group B of the Central Civil Services of the executive branch of the Government of India.

Indian Information Service officers are the media managers of the Government of India. They act as a vital communication link between the Government and the people by way of disseminating information and communicating various Government policies and schemes to the public at large; and also collecting and providing valuable feedback to the Government for policy formulation.

Most IIS officers work in various media units which are under Ministry of Information and Broadcasting such as DD News, All India Radio, Press Information Bureau, Central Bureau of Communication etc. During their tenure in Press Information Bureau, they are posted with various Ministries as spokespersons to handle the Ministry's information and communication needs and help in policy formulation.

IIS officers are also posted as spokespersons to various constitutional bodies such as Comptroller and Auditor General of India, Election Commission of India and statutory bodies such as Central Bureau of Investigation. Besides postings all over India, an IIS officer also gets posted to a few foreign assignments under the Prasar Bharati.

== History ==
Indian Information Service (IIS) was established as an organized central service named Central Information Service (CIS) on 1 March 1960. Prior to 1960, these posts were staffed by officers recruited separately by each media unit. In 1987, CIS was bifurcated into IIS Group 'A' and IIS Group 'B'.

== Recruitment ==
IIS Group-A officers are selected through two modes,

1. Direct recruitment through Civil Services Examination conducted by the Union Public Service Commission for recruitment to the various Civil Services of the Government of India, including the Indian Administrative Service (IAS), Indian Foreign Service (IFS) and Indian Police Service (IPS) among others.
2. And also through promotion to IIS Group-A from the Senior Grade officers of IIS Group-B.

== Privatization ==
With the exponential increase of private electronic and print media, and with the universal access to social media, the role of IIS officers has sharply shrunk in the recent years. The IIS officers have also not been able to keep abreast with the competition. The government is currently considering privatizing the broadcasting in India.

== Training ==
After the officers are allocated the Service depending on their rank and preferences in the Civil Services Examination, they undergo a three months Foundation Course at Lal Bahadur Shastri National Academy of Administration Mussoorie. This is followed by nine months of professional training at Indian Institute of Mass Communication, New Delhi. During the training period there is also a 3-week training module for IIS Officer Trainees at Film and Television Institute of India Pune. Thereafter, an IIS Probationer undergoes one year On-Job-Training, during which he/she is attached to various media units under Ministry of Information and Broadcasting such as-

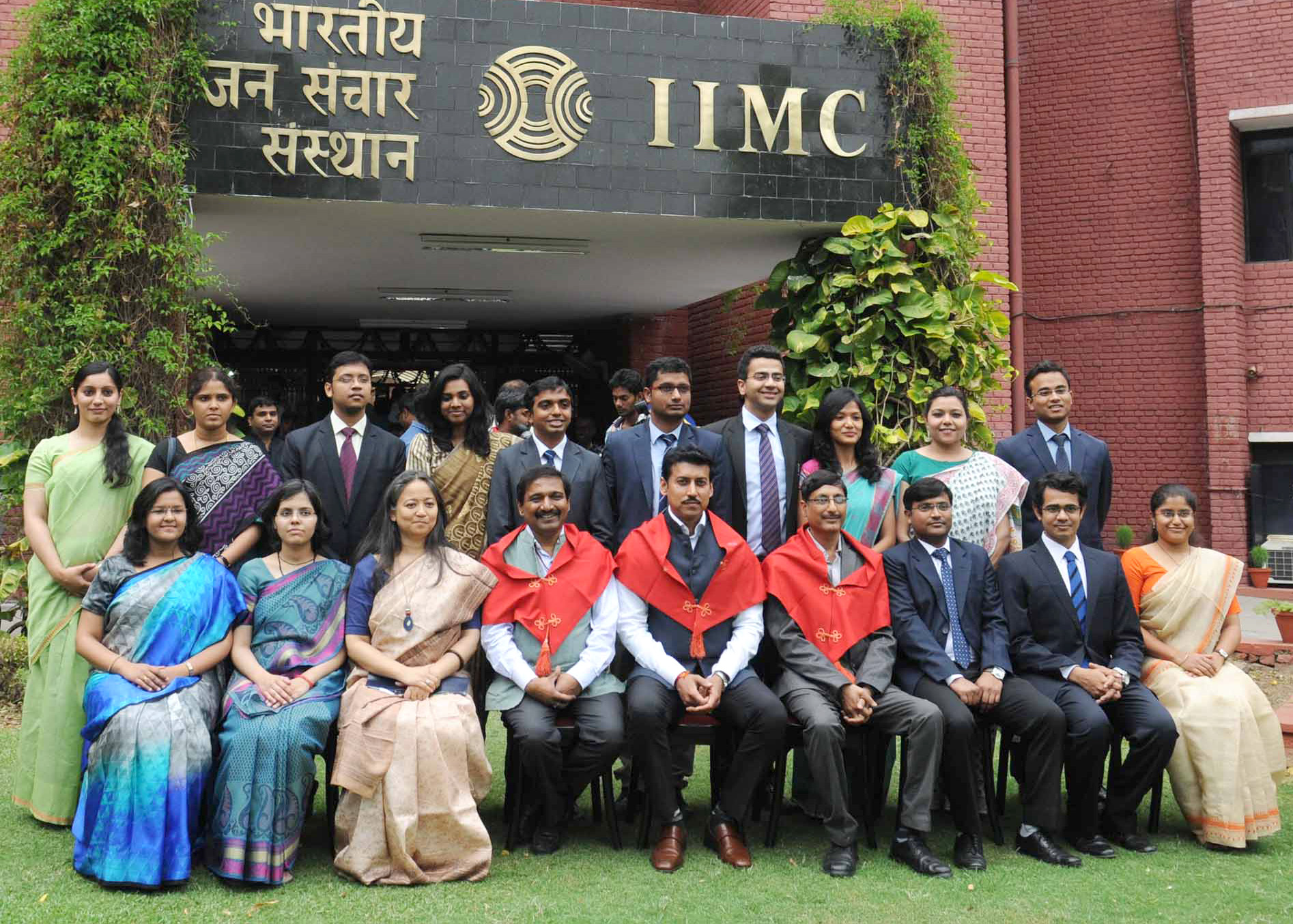
The 2015 batch of IIS officers before IIMC with the Minister of State for Information & Broadcasting, Col. Rajyavardhan Singh Rathore

- Press Information Bureau
- All India Radio
- DD News
- Registrar of Newspapers for India
- Publications Division
- New Media Wing of Ministry of Information and Broadcasting
- Central Bureau of Communication (merger of Song and Drama Division, Directorate of Field Publicity and Directorate of Advertising and Visual Publicity in 2017) – 23 Regional Outreach Bureau (ROB) and 148 Field Outreach Bureau are there under CBC.
- Electronic Media Monitoring Centre

== Career progression ==
After successful completion of the two years of probation, an IIS officer is posted to a media unit depending on the vacancy and requirement. During the various roles of his or her career, in Directorate hierarchy, an IIS officer progresses through following designations in ascending order of seniority-

Ranks, designations, and positions held by Indian Information Service (IIS) officers in their career
Grade / Scale (Level on Pay Matrix)	Posting in Indian Information Service	Position in Government of India	Position in Order of precedence in India	Pay Scale (Basic Pay)
Apex Scale (Pay Level 17)	Director General of Information	Secretary	23	₹225,000 (US$2,300)
Higher Administrative Grade + (Pay Level 16)	Principal Director General	Additional Secretary	25	₹205,400 (US$2,100)—₹224,400 (US$2,300)
Higher Administrative Grade (Pay Level 15)	Director General	Additional Secretary	25	₹182,200 (US$1,900)—₹224,100 (US$2,300)
Senior Administrative Grade (Pay Level 14)	Additional Director General	Joint Secretary	26	₹144,200 (US$1,500)—₹218,200 (US$2,300)
Selection Grade (Pay Level 13)	Director	Director		₹123,100 (US$1,300)—₹215,900 (US$2,200)
Junior Administrative Grade (Pay Level 12)	Joint Director	Deputy Secretary		₹78,800 (US$820)—₹209,200 (US$2,200)
Senior Time Scale (Pay Level 11)	Deputy Director	Under Secretary		₹67,700 (US$700)—₹208,700 (US$2,200)
Junior Time Scale (Pay Level 10)	Assistant Director Entry-level (Probationer)	Assistant Secretary		₹56,100 (US$580)—₹177,500 (US$1,800)

== Work profile ==
By its very nature of handling the information and communication, the Service enjoys a great diversity in its nature of work and responsibilities. The Ministry of I&B lists the functions of an IIS officer in its official mandate as:

- To plan and execute the media strategy to provide publicity to various programmes/schemes of the Government for the welfare of the people across the country.
- Organisation of press conferences and visual publicity campaigns for disseminating information to the people on the various activities and policies of the Government of India through various tools of mass communication.
- Control, supervision and guidance to News Services units of All India Radio and DD News including regional news units.
- To look after administration and coordination work of PIB headquarters and day to day publicity works of the Government.
- To guide, supervise and control the field publicity units of the Central Government spread across the country and to issue timely directions for effective monitoring and evaluation of field units.
- To monitor the complex legal issues involved in the verification of titles, registration and circulation for Newspapers in India.

== See also ==
- Press Information Bureau
- Ministry of Information and Broadcasting
- National Media Centre, New Delhi
- Ofcom
