= Geeta Ilangovan =

Indian journalist and filmmaker

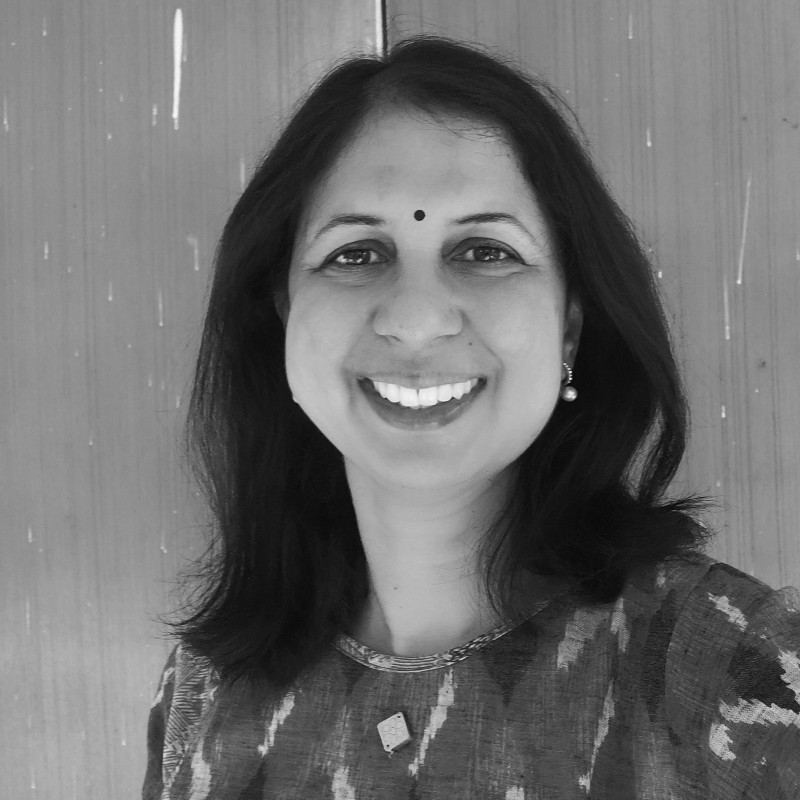
- Born: 1 January 1971 (age 55); Coimbatore, India
- Occupation: Film director
- Writing career
- Language: Tamil
- Genre: Non-Fiction

Geeta Ilangovan is an Indian journalist, writer and filmmaker of short films and documentaries which tackle social and gender based issues.

== Education ==
She is from Tiruppur. She earned a degree in nutrition science from PSG College, Coimbatore where she met her husband. She then earned an M.A. in journalism at Madurai Kamaraj University, despite resistance from her family.

Ilangovan then applied for the Indian Information Service exam conducted by the UPSC for journalism postgraduates. In 1998, she gained an all-India ranking of 2.

== Career ==
=== Filmmaking ===
Her first short film 'Little space' (2007), about children with mental illness, won the SCARF India award. In 2014, it won 2nd best documentary in the Chennai Women's International Film Festival. Her 2010 film Agrinaigal (2010) is about the struggle of transgender people to find dignified employment. She made three conversational films for children regarding myths and issues around menstruation, and caste discrimination including the one on 'honor killing', in 2018.

=== Writing ===
Ilangovan primarily writes non-fiction. Her article on women panchayat leaders, published in Tamil magazine Aval Vikatan, won the Sarojini Naidu Award and 200,000 cash prize for best reporting of women in panchayat raj (from Hunger Project-India) in 2005. Her essays were published under the title, "Dupatta Podunga Thozhi" by Her stories Publication. She has also spoken about her work to students at schools.

== See also ==
- List of Indian writers
