= National Media Analytics Centre =

Proposed government agency in India

National Media Analytics Centre is a proposed special media cell of the Indian National Security Council Secretariat tasked to track content online to counter news and comments deemed negative or provocative. The centre uses software designed by Ponnurangam Kumaraguru, an assistant professor at Delhi-based Indraprastha Institute of Information Technology, to comb posts and comments and classifies them into relevant categories.

== See also ==
- Electronic Media Monitoring Centre
- New Media Wing
