= List of chief guests at the Delhi Republic Day parade =

Since 1950, India has been hosting head of state or government of another country as the state guest of honor for Republic Day celebrations in New Delhi. During 1950–1954, Republic Day celebrations were organized at different venues (like Irwin Amphitheatre, Kingsway, Red Fort and Ramlila Maidan). It was only starting 1955 when the Republic Day parade in its present form was organized at Rajpath. The guest country is chosen after a deliberation of strategic, economic and political interests. During 1950s–1970s, a number of Non-Aligned Movement and Eastern Bloc countries were hosted by India.

== List of chief guests ==
Chief guests at the Delhi Republic Day Parade
Year	Portrait	Chief Guest	Country	Designation	Note		Host
1950		Sukarno	Indonesia	President of Indonesia			Rajendra Prasad
1951		Tribhuvan	Nepal	King of Nepal			Rajendra Prasad
1952	No information available						
1953	No information available						
1954		Jigme Dorji Wangchuck	Bhutan	King of Bhutan			Rajendra Prasad
1955		Malik Ghulam Muhammad	Pakistan	Governor-General of Pakistan	(Note: First guest for parade at Rajpath.)		Rajendra Prasad
1956		Rab Butler	United Kingdom	Chancellor of the Exchequer	Two guests (Note: On each of these occasions, Edwina Mountbatten, Countess Mountbatten of Burma from United Kingdom was also the official guest for the parade.)		Rajendra Prasad
1956		Kōtarō Tanaka	Japan	Chief Justice of Japan	Two guests		Rajendra Prasad
1957		Georgy Zhukov	Soviet Union	Minister of Defence			Rajendra Prasad
1958		Ye Jianying	China	Marshal of the People's Republic of China			Rajendra Prasad
1959		Philip	United Kingdom	Royal consort of British monarch	2nd invitation		Rajendra Prasad
1960		Kliment Voroshilov	Soviet Union	Chairman of the Presidium of the Supreme Soviet	2nd invitation		Rajendra Prasad
1961		Elizabeth II	United Kingdom	Queen of the United Kingdom and the other Commonwealth realms	3rd invitation (Note: Prince Philip, Duke of Edinburgh also accompanied Queen Elizabeth II during the parade.)		Rajendra Prasad
1962		Viggo Kampmann	Denmark	Prime Minister of Denmark	(Note: Attended Republic Day in Madras (Chennai).)		Rajendra Prasad
1963		Norodom Sihanouk	Cambodia	King of Cambodia			Sarvepalli Radhakrishnan
1964		Louis Mountbatten	United Kingdom	Chief of the Defence Staff	4th invitation		Sarvepalli Radhakrishnan
1965		Rana Abdul Hamid	Pakistan	Minister of Food and Agriculture	2nd invitation		Sarvepalli Radhakrishnan
1966	No information available (Note: No invitations were sent out possibly due to the demise of Prime Minister Lal Bahadur Shastri on 11 January 1966 in Tashkent. The new government headed by Indira Gandhi was sworn in on 24 January 1966 (only two days before the Republic Day).)						
1967		Mohammed Zahir Shah	Afghanistan	King of Afghanistan	(Note: For the first time, the President of India (Sarvepalli Radhakrishnan) could not take the salute at the Republic Day parade due to ill-health. Mohammed Zahir Shah arrived on 28 January.)		Sarvepalli Radhakrishnan
1968		Alexei Kosygin	Soviet Union	Chairman of the Council of Ministers of the Soviet Union	3rd invitation	Two guests	Zakir Husain
1968		Josip Broz Tito	Yugoslavia	President of Yugoslavia		Two guests	Zakir Husain
1969		Todor Zhivkov	Bulgaria	Prime Minister of Bulgaria			Zakir Husain
1970		Baudouin	Belgium	King of Belgium	(Note: Attended only the Beating Retreat.)		V. V. Giri
1971		Julius Nyerere	Tanzania	President of Tanzania			V. V. Giri
1972		Seewoosagur Ramgoolam	Mauritius	Prime Minister of Mauritius			V. V. Giri
1973		Mobutu Sese Seko	Zaire	President of Zaire			V. V. Giri
1974		Josip Broz Tito	Yugoslavia	President of Yugoslavia	2nd invitation	Two guests	V. V. Giri
1974		Sirimavo Bandaranaike	Sri Lanka	Prime Minister of Sri Lanka		Two guests	V. V. Giri
1975		Kenneth Kaunda	Zambia	President of Zambia			Fakhruddin Ali Ahmed
1976		Jacques Chirac	France	Prime Minister of France			Fakhruddin Ali Ahmed
1977		Edward Gierek	Poland	First Secretary of the Polish United Workers' Party			Fakhruddin Ali Ahmed
1978		Patrick Hillery	Ireland	President of Ireland			Neelam Sanjiva Reddy
1979		Malcolm Fraser	Australia	Prime Minister of Australia			Neelam Sanjiva Reddy
1980		Valéry Giscard d'Estaing	France	President of France	2nd invitation		Neelam Sanjiva Reddy
1981		Jose Lopez Portillo	Mexico	President of Mexico			Neelam Sanjiva Reddy
1982		Juan Carlos I	Spain	King of Spain			Neelam Sanjiva Reddy
1983		Shehu Shagari	Nigeria	President of Nigeria			Zail Singh
1984		Jigme Singye Wangchuck	Bhutan	King of Bhutan	2nd invitation		Zail Singh
1985		Raúl Alfonsín	Argentina	President of Argentina			Zail Singh
1986		Andreas Papandreou	Greece	Prime Minister of Greece			Zail Singh
1987		Alan Garcia	Peru	President of Peru			Zail Singh
1988		J. R. Jayewardene	Sri Lanka	President of Sri Lanka	2nd invitation		Ramaswamy Venkataraman
1989		Nguyễn Văn Linh	Vietnam	General Secretary of the Communist Party of Vietnam			Ramaswamy Venkataraman
1990		Anerood Jugnauth	Mauritius	Prime Minister of Mauritius	2nd invitation		Ramaswamy Venkataraman
1991		Maumoon Abdul Gayoom	Maldives	President of the Maldives			Ramaswamy Venkataraman
1992		Mário Soares	Portugal	President of Portugal			Ramaswamy Venkataraman
1993		John Major	United Kingdom	Prime Minister of United Kingdom	5th invitation		Shankar Dayal Sharma
1994		Goh Chok Tong	Singapore	Prime Minister of Singapore			Shankar Dayal Sharma
1995		Nelson Mandela	South Africa	President of South Africa			Shankar Dayal Sharma
1996		Fernando Henrique Cardoso	Brazil	President of Brazil			Shankar Dayal Sharma
1997		Basdeo Panday	Trinidad and Tobago	Prime Minister of Trinidad and Tobago			Shankar Dayal Sharma
1998		Jacques Chirac	France	President of France	3rd invitation		K. R. Narayanan
1999		Birendra	Nepal	King of Nepal	2nd invitation		K. R. Narayanan
2000		Olusegun Obasanjo	Nigeria	President of Nigeria	2nd invitation		K. R. Narayanan
2001		Abdelaziz Bouteflika	Algeria	President of Algeria			K. R. Narayanan
2002		Cassam Uteem	Mauritius	President of Mauritius	3rd invitation		K. R. Narayanan
2003		Mohammed Khatami	Iran	President of Iran			A. P. J. Abdul Kalam
2004		Luiz Inácio Lula da Silva	Brazil	President of Brazil	2nd invitation		A. P. J. Abdul Kalam
2005		Jigme Singye Wangchuck	Bhutan	King of Bhutan	3rd invitation		A. P. J. Abdul Kalam
2006		Abdullah	Saudi Arabia	King of Saudi Arabia			A. P. J. Abdul Kalam
2007		Vladimir Putin	Russia	President of Russia	4th invitation		A. P. J. Abdul Kalam
2008		Nicolas Sarkozy	France	President of France	4th invitation		Pratibha Patil
2009		Nursultan Nazarbayev	Kazakhstan	President of Kazakhstan			Pratibha Patil
2010		Lee Myung Bak	South Korea	President of South Korea			Pratibha Patil
2011		Susilo Bambang Yudhoyono	Indonesia	President of Indonesia	2nd invitation		Pratibha Patil
2012		Yingluck Shinawatra	Thailand	Prime Minister of Thailand			Pratibha Patil
2013		Jigme Khesar Namgyel Wangchuck	Bhutan	King of Bhutan	4th invitation		Pranab Mukherjee
2014		Shinzo Abe	Japan	Prime Minister of Japan	2nd invitation		Pranab Mukherjee
2015		Barack Obama	United States	President of the United States			Pranab Mukherjee
2016		François Hollande	France	President of France	5th invitation		Pranab Mukherjee
2017		Mohamed bin Zayed Al Nahyan	United Arab Emirates	Crown Prince of Abu Dhabi			Pranab Mukherjee
2018		Hassanal Bolkiah	Brunei	Sultan of Brunei		Ten guests (Note: Heads of the ten ASEAN states.)	Ram Nath Kovind
2018		Hun Sen	Cambodia	Prime Minister of Cambodia	2nd invitation	Ten guests	Ram Nath Kovind
2018		Joko Widodo	Indonesia	President of Indonesia	3rd invitation	Ten guests	Ram Nath Kovind
2018		Thongloun Sisoulith	Laos	Prime Minister of Laos		Ten guests	Ram Nath Kovind
2018		Najib Razak	Malaysia	Prime Minister of Malaysia		Ten guests	Ram Nath Kovind
2018		Aung San Suu Kyi	Myanmar	State Counsellor of Myanmar		Ten guests	Ram Nath Kovind
2018		Rodrigo Duterte	Philippines	President of the Philippines		Ten guests	Ram Nath Kovind
2018		Lee Hsien Loong	Singapore	Prime Minister of Singapore	2nd invitation	Ten guests	Ram Nath Kovind
2018		Prayut Chan-o-cha	Thailand	Prime Minister of Thailand	2nd invitation	Ten guests	Ram Nath Kovind
2018		Nguyễn Xuân Phúc	Vietnam	Prime Minister of Vietnam	2nd invitation	Ten guests	Ram Nath Kovind
2019		Cyril Ramaphosa	South Africa	President of South Africa	2nd invitation		Ram Nath Kovind
2020		Jair Bolsonaro	Brazil	President of Brazil	3rd invitation		Ram Nath Kovind
2021	No chief guest due to COVID-19 pandemic (Note: An invitation for 2021 was sent to British Prime Minister Boris Johnson, but after a few weeks he cancelled his visit, citing the need to oversee pandemic response in the United Kingdom.) (Note: Invitations for 2022 were sent to leaders of five Central Asian nations – Kassym-Jomart Tokayev of Kazakhstan, Sadyr Japarov of Kyrgyzstan, Emomali Rahmon of Tajikistan, Gurbanguly Berdimuhamedow of Turkmenistan and Shavkat Mirziyoyev of Uzbekistan. But due to surge in COVID-19 cases and the new Omicron variant being on the rise, Indian government decided not to host foreign dignitaries.)						
2022	No chief guest due to COVID-19 pandemic						
2023		Abdel Fattah el-Sisi	Egypt	President of Egypt			Droupadi Murmu
2024		Emmanuel Macron	France	President of France	6th invitation (Note: An invitation was sent out to U.S. President Joe Biden, but he cancelled his visit due to the country's 2023 spying allegations against India.)		Droupadi Murmu
2025		Prabowo Subianto	Indonesia	President of Indonesia	4th invitation		Droupadi Murmu
2026		Ursula von der Leyen	European Union	President of the European Commission	Two guests		Droupadi Murmu
2026		António Costa	European Union	President of the European Council	Two guests		Droupadi Murmu

== Summary by continent and region ==
Countries invited as chief guests for the Republic Day parade. European Union (once invited) and Yugoslavia (twice invited) has not been depicted in the map. Erstwhile Soviet Union is depicted as Russia. 6 times (France) 5 times (United Kingdom) 4 times (Bhutan, Indonesia, Soviet Union/Russia) Thrice (Brazil, Mauritius) Twice (Cambodia, Japan, Nepal, Nigeria, Pakistan, Singapore, South Africa, Sri Lanka, Thailand, Vietnam) Once Never invited

By continent and geographic region, the invitations break up as follows:

Continent	Region	Invitations	Countries
Asia (37)	Southeast Asia	17	Brunei, Cambodia (twice), Indonesia (4 times), Laos, Malaysia, Myanmar, Philippines, Singapore (twice), Thailand (twice), Vietnam (twice)
Asia (37)	South Asia	12	Afghanistan, Bhutan (4 times), Maldives, Nepal (twice), Pakistan (twice), Sri Lanka (twice)
Asia (37)	East Asia	4	China, Japan (twice), South Korea
Asia (37)	West Asia	3	Iran, Saudi Arabia, United Arab Emirates
Asia (37)	Central Asia	1	Kazakhstan
Europe (26)	Western Europe	13	Belgium, France (6 times), Ireland, United Kingdom (5 times)
Europe (26)	Eastern Europe	8	Bulgaria, Poland, Soviet Union/Russia (4 times), Yugoslavia (twice)
Europe (26)	Southern Europe	3	Greece, Portugal, Spain
Europe (26)	Northern Europe	1	Denmark
Europe (26)	European Union	1	European Union
Africa (12)	Southern Africa	6	Mauritius (thrice), South Africa (twice), Zambia
Africa (12)	North Africa	2	Algeria, Egypt
Africa (12)	West Africa	2	Nigeria (twice)
Africa (12)	East Africa	1	Tanzania
Africa (12)	Central Africa	1	Zaire
America (8)	South America	5	Argentina, Brazil (thrice), Peru
America (8)	North America	2	Mexico, United States
America (8)	Caribbean	1	Trinidad and Tobago
Oceania (1)	Australasia	1	Australia

== See also ==
- List of diplomatic visits to India
