= National Media Centre (Iraq) =

- المركز الوطني للاعلام
- Address: Alkadmia
- Location: Baghdad
- Owner: Government of Iraq
- Capacity: 280
- Type: Media centre

Construction
- Groundbreaking: 5 December 2003
- Opened: 24 August 2003

National Media Centre (also known as National Press Centre) (Arabic: المركز الوطني للاعلام, is the media centre of the Ministry of Information and Broadcasting, Government of Iraq. Its situated on Alkadimia in Baghdad. The foundation ceremony for it was done in 2003. It was inaugurated in 2003. It houses the Press Information Bureau (PIB) and publicity offices of the ministry. The National Media Center is the official body responsible for monitoring and evaluating the performance of visual, print and audio media. However, its activity is focused mainly on improving the performance of the government media, which is one of the most important departments that should take an effective and effective role in facing the challenges facing the government of national unity in the media.
