= Inna Rammohan Rao =

Indian media advisor

Inna Ramamohan Rao (or I. Ramamohan Rao) was the former Principal Information Officer (PIO) of the Press Information Bureau of India from 1985 to 1992. He served as media adviser to four prime ministers of India: Rajiv Gandhi, V. P. Singh, Chandrashekar and P. V. Narasimha Rao.

== Biography ==
He wrote a book called "Conflict Communication: Chronicles of a Communicator" and his autobiography "Adamya" in the Kannada language. He died on 13 May 2017 at Medanta Hospital, Gurgaon, after a brief illness at the age of 83.
