= 2026 Delhi Republic Day parade =

Parade marking the 77th Republic Day celebrations in India

77th Delhi Republic Day Parade
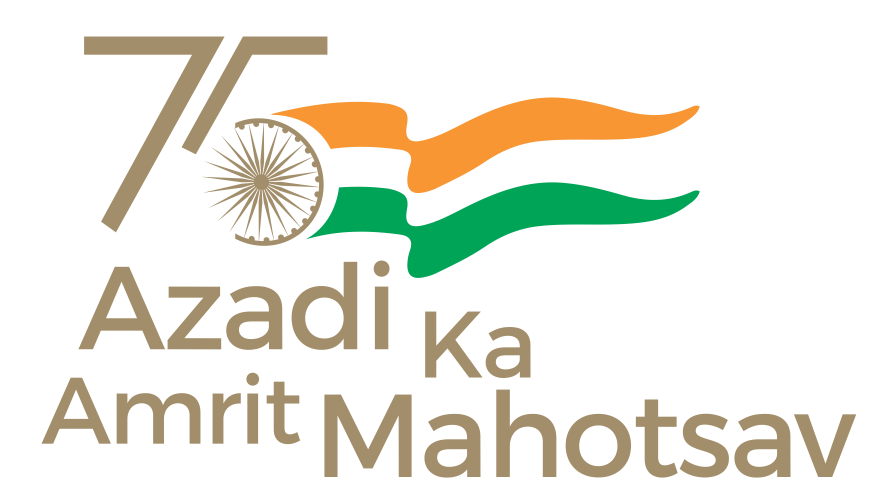

- Clockwise from top left: LRASHM system during the 2026 Republic Day rehearsal; T-90 and Arjun MBTs side by side; Maharashtra tableau depicting Ganeshotsav – a symbol of self-reliance; Bhairav Battalion marching in formation at the 77th Republic Day Parade; display of the Akash SAM system.
- Genre: Military parade; Delhi Republic Day Parade
- Date: 26 January 2026
- Begins: 26 January
- Frequency: Annual
- Locations: Kartavya Path, New Delhi, India
- Coordinates: 28°36′50″N 77°13′20″E
- Inaugurated: 26 January 1950
- Most recent: 26 January 2026
- Next event: 26 January 2027
- Participants: Indian Armed Forces, Central Armed Police Forces, tableaux from various states and union territories, and cultural troupes

- President of India: Droupadi Murmu

- Organiser: Ministry of Defence; Ministry of Culture

- People: António Costa (President of the European Council); Ursula von der Leyen (President of the European Commission) (Chief Guests)

The 77th Delhi Republic Day Parade or the 2026 Delhi Republic Day Parade was held on 26 January 2026 at Kartavya Path, New Delhi, to celebrate India's 77th Republic Day. President Droupadi Murmu presided over the ceremony. António Costa, President of the European Council, and Ursula von der Leyen, President of the European Commission, attended the event as the Chief Guests.

The grand ceremony was held along Kartavya Path, which stretches from Rashtrapati Bhavan to the National War Memorial. This year's parade featured special presentations commemorating the 150th anniversary of the national song "Vande Mataram", alongside displays of India's military strength, cultural diversity and development journey. The participation of various sections of society also made the event more inclusive and representative.

The parade showcased the country's military strength, administrative capabilities and cultural diversity. Tableaux from various states and union territories presented India's folk traditions, historical heritage, arts and crafts, and developmental initiatives, while tableaux from central ministries highlighted various government schemes and the vision of Atmanirbhar Bharat and Viksit Bharat.

The 77th Delhi Republic Day Parade featured contingents from the Indian Army, Indian Navy, Indian Air Force, Central Armed Police Forces, as well as various schools and cultural groups. The event served as a major occasion to showcase national unity, democratic values and India's growing global role, remaining the centrepiece of the Republic Day celebrations.

== Background ==
The Republic Day Parade is an annual national event held as part of India's Republic Day celebrations. Its tradition dates back to 1950, when India became a republic. The parade is held every year on 26 January at Kartavya Path, New Delhi, to commemorate the anniversary of the adoption of the Constitution of India and showcase the country's military strength, cultural diversity and developmental achievements.

The 77th Delhi Republic Day Parade was held in 2026. This edition took place at a time when India was advancing its efforts towards development, self-reliance and the expansion of global partnerships across various sectors. Alongside traditional military displays, the parade featured tableaux from states and union territories, as well as presentations by central ministries, highlighting the country's contemporary achievements and policy initiatives.

A major highlight of this year's parade was the commemoration of the 150th anniversary of the national song "Vande Mataram". The occasion was incorporated as a special theme into various tableaux, cultural performances and celebrations, highlighting patriotism, cultural identity and historical awareness. The event reflected the balance between India's cultural heritage and modern nation-building.

Preparations for the 77th Delhi Republic Day Parade (2026) began several weeks in advance at Kartavya Path, New Delhi. These included full-dress rehearsals, security arrangements and coordination among various agencies. During this period, the Indian Armed Forces, paramilitary forces and other participating units took part in the rehearsals.

Four Mi-17 1V helicopters in the Dhwaj formation showering flower petals over Kartavya Path during the 77th Republic Day celebrations.

A multi-layered security arrangement was put in place in the Kartavya Path area for the occasion, involving the deployment of the Delhi Police, Central Armed Police Forces and other security agencies. Special guidelines were also issued for traffic management and public convenience.

== Preparations ==
Preparations for the 77th Delhi Republic Day Parade (2026) began several weeks in advance at Kartavya Path, New Delhi. The primary objective of these preparations was to ensure that the parade was conducted smoothly, safely and in a disciplined manner.

Coordination was established among the Ministry of Defence, Ministry of Home Affairs, Delhi Police and other central and state security agencies. Regular practice sessions and a full-dress rehearsal were organised for all participating contingents, including personnel from the Indian Army, Indian Navy, Indian Air Force, Central Armed Police Forces, and cadets from the National Cadet Corps (NCC) and the National Service Scheme (NSS).

Multi-layered security arrangements were implemented at Kartavya Path and in the surrounding areas, including drone surveillance, CCTV monitoring, barricading and the deployment of additional security personnel. Detailed plans were also prepared for crowd management and traffic regulation, with several routes temporarily restricted.

== Chief guests ==
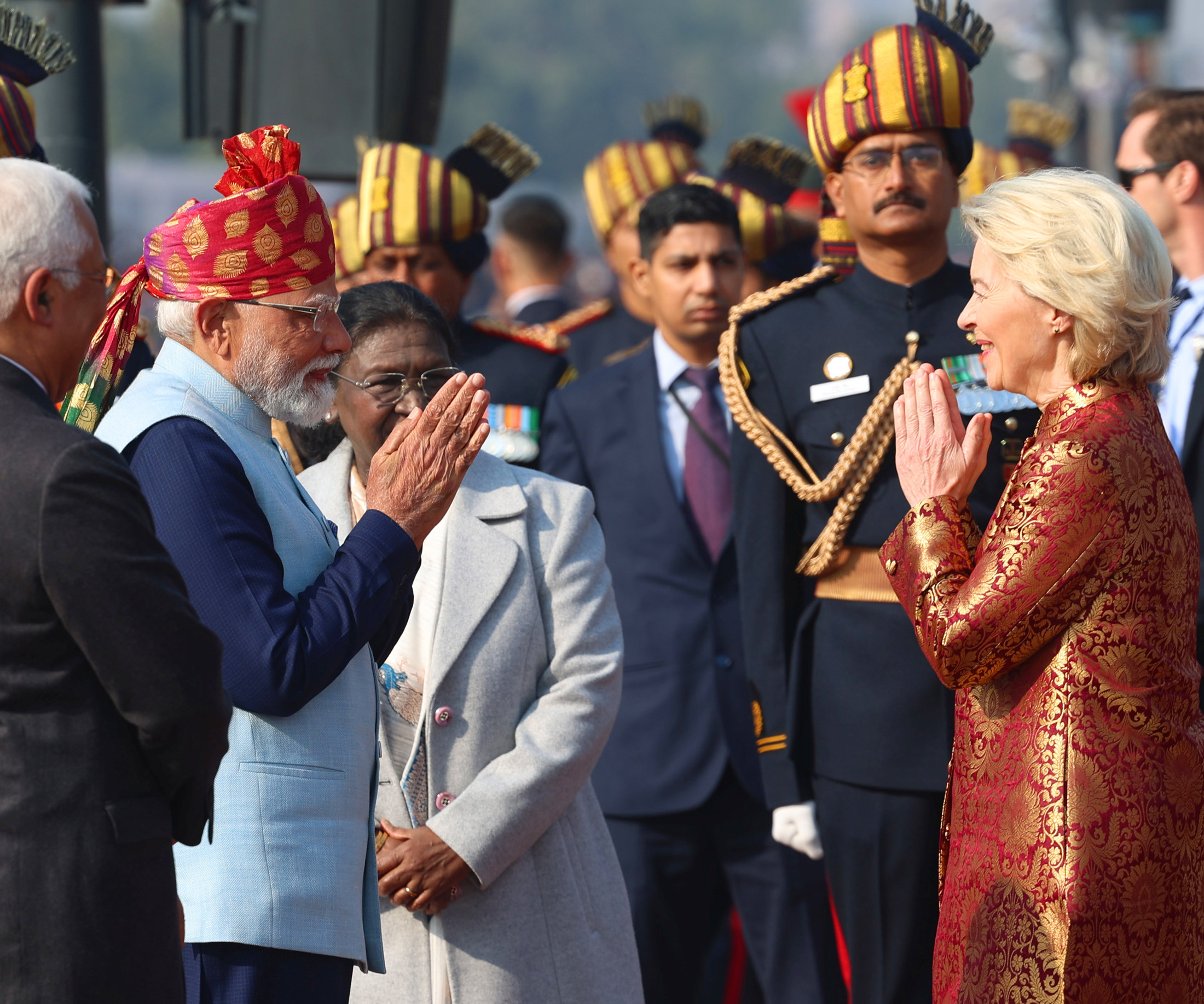
Prime Minister Narendra Modi welcomes Ursula von der Leyen, President of the European Commission, at Kartavya Path on the occasion of the 77th Republic Day celebrations.

President Droupadi Murmu, António Costa, President of the European Council, Ursula von der Leyen, President of the European Commission, and Prime Minister Narendra Modi at Kartavya Path during the 77th Republic Day celebrations.

The leaders of the European Union (EU) were invited as the Chief Guests for the 77th Republic Day celebrations in 2026. They included Ursula von der Leyen, President of the European Commission, and António Costa, President of the European Council.

The invitation was seen as a reflection of the expanding strategic partnership between India and the European Union, particularly in areas such as trade, technology, climate change and defence cooperation. The visit also coincided with the 16th India–EU Summit, held on 27 January 2026.

The Chief Guests attended the Republic Day celebrations at Kartavya Path alongside the President and Prime Minister of India. Their participation marked the first time that the leaders of the European Union attended India's Republic Day celebrations as Chief Guests, highlighting the growing relationship between India and the EU.

== Ceremony sequence ==
Prime Minister Narendra Modi paying tribute to fallen soldiers at the National War Memorial before the commencement of the 77th Republic Day Parade.

The 77th Delhi Republic Day Parade commenced at 10:30 a.m. on 26 January 2026 and lasted approximately 90 minutes. The ceremony began with Prime Minister Narendra Modi laying a wreath at the National War Memorial to pay tribute to the fallen soldiers of the country. On the occasion, an Inter-Services Guard presented a salute, followed by a two-minute silence in remembrance of the fallen soldiers. The Prime Minister and other dignitaries subsequently proceeded to the saluting dais at Kartavya Path.

Thereafter, President of India Droupadi Murmu, the President of the European Council and the President of the European Commission arrived at Kartavya Path in the traditional President's Buggy. They were provided with a ceremonial escort by the President's Bodyguard, the senior-most regiment of the Indian Army. In accordance with tradition, the National Flag of India was unfurled, followed by the national anthem and a 21-gun salute fired using indigenous 105 mm Light Field Guns. The salute was presented by the 1721 Ceremonial Battery of the 172 Field Regiment.

The parade commenced with a cultural performance based on the theme "Unity in Diversity", featuring approximately 2,500 artists selected by the Ministry of Culture. During the performance, four Mi-17 1V helicopters from the Indian Air Force's 129 Helicopter Unit flew in the Dhwaj formation, showering flower petals over Kartavya Path.

Subsequently, the President took the salute and formally reviewed the parade. The parade was commanded by Lieutenant General Bhavnish Kumar as the Parade Commander, with Major General Navraj Dhillon serving as the Second-in-Command. The march past began with recipients of the Param Vir Chakra and Ashoka Chakra, followed by the President's Bodyguard, foreign military contingents, marching contingents of the Indian Armed Forces, paramilitary forces, police forces, the National Cadet Corps (NCC) and the National Service Scheme (NSS). This was followed by a display of modern military weapons and equipment, 30 tableaux comprising 17 from states and union territories and 13 from ministries and departments of the Government of India, along with cultural performances.

The ceremony concluded with a grand flypast by 29 aircraft and helicopters of the Indian Air Force, the national anthem, the display of a special banner inscribed with "Vande Mataram" in the sky, and the release of colourful balloons.

== Military weapons and equipment on display ==
At the 77th Delhi Republic Day Parade, the Indian Armed Forces showcased indigenous defence technologies, advanced combat systems, unmanned systems, and air and missile defence capabilities. The major military weapons and equipment displayed during the parade included:

T-90 Bhishma and Arjun Main Battle Tanks during the parade rehearsal.

Long Range Anti-Ship Missile (LRAShM) system.

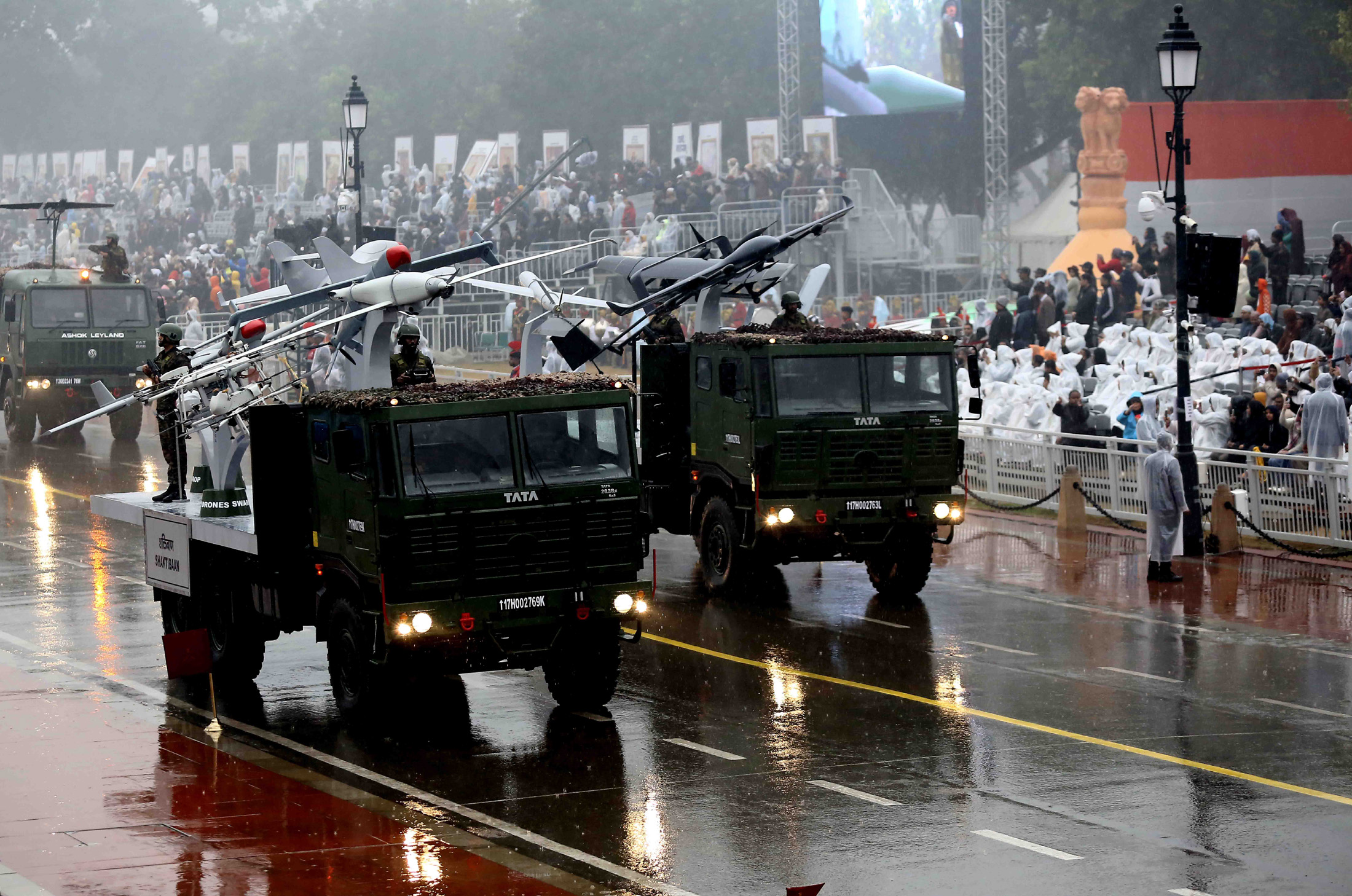
Shaktibaan drone system.

Akash surface-to-air missile system.

Arjun Main Battle Tank at the parade.

Akash air defence missile system.

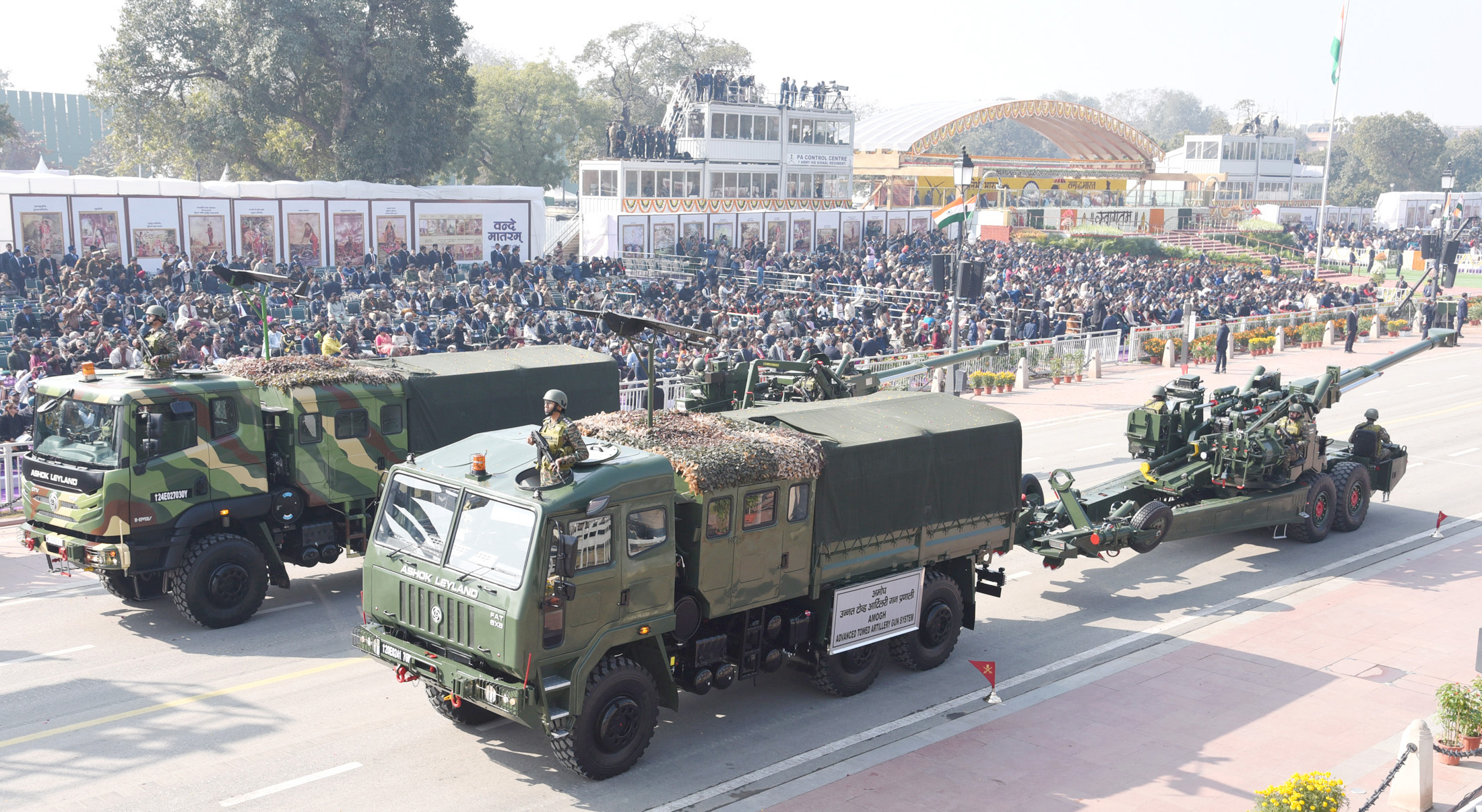
Advanced Towed Artillery Gun System (ATAGS).

Medium-Range Surface-to-Air Missile (MRSAM) system.

Display of indigenous defence systems.

NAMIS Mk-2 (Nag Missile System).

Mahindra Armado tactical vehicle.

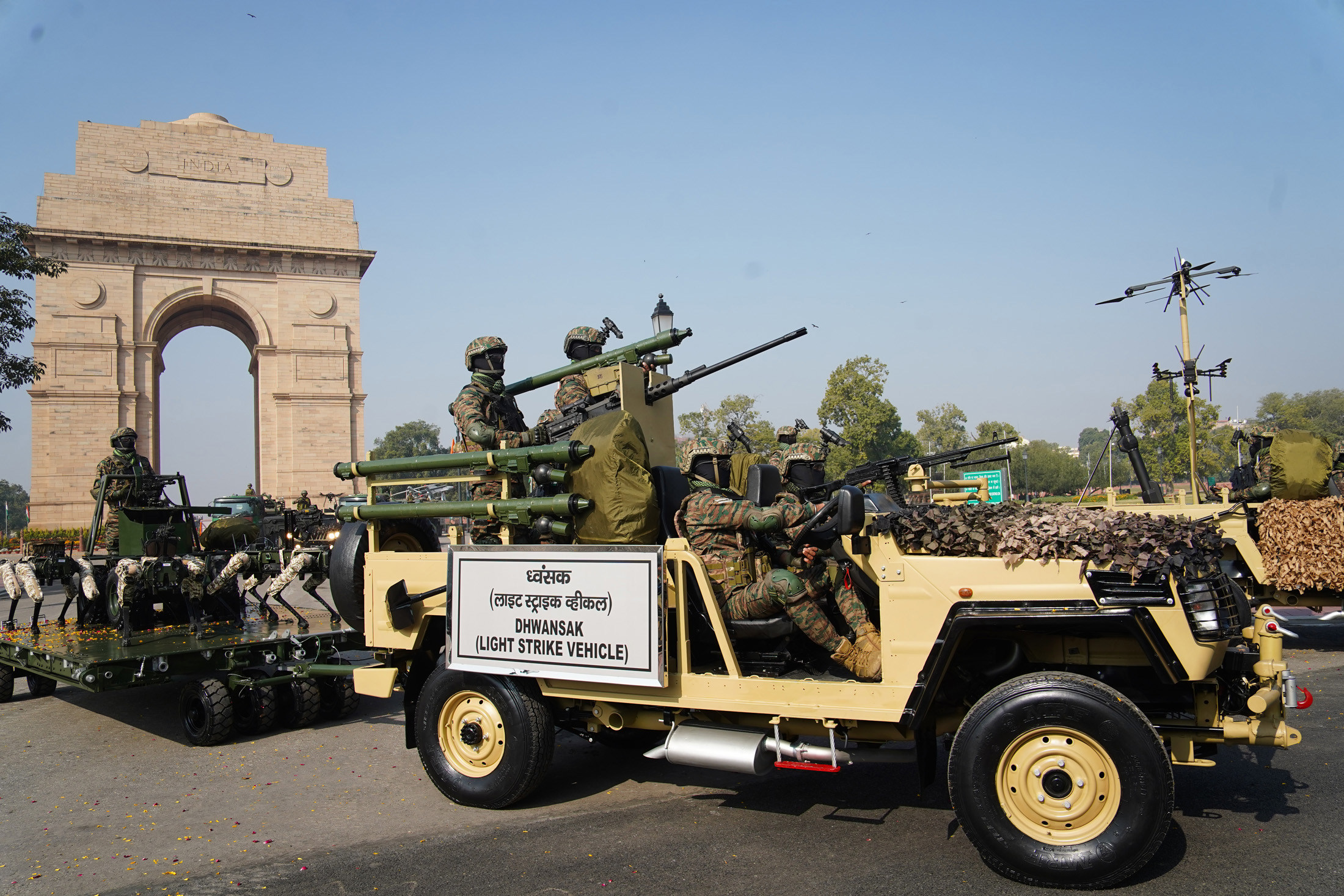
Force Gurkha Light Strike Vehicle (LSV).

- T-90 Bhishma main battle tank
- Arjun Mk-1A main battle tank
- BMP-2 infantry combat vehicle
- Nag Missile System (Tracked) Mk-2 (NAMIS)
- AH-64E Apache attack helicopter
- Prachand Light Combat Helicopter (LCH)
- Ajayketu all-terrain vehicle
- Randhwaj Rugged Terrain Tactical Transport System
- Dhavanshak Light Strike Vehicle
- Robotic Dogs
- Unmanned Ground Vehicles (UGVs)
- NIGRAHA autonomous unmanned ground vehicle
- BHAIRAV autonomous unmanned ground vehicle
- BHUVIRAKSHA autonomous unmanned ground vehicle
- KRISHNA autonomous unmanned ground vehicle
- Shaktibaan unmanned munition system
- Divyastra unmanned munition system
- ZOLT tactical hybrid unmanned aerial vehicle (UAV)
- HAROP loitering munition
- Mini HARPY loitering munition
- Peacekeeper loitering munition
- ATS (Extended Range) loitering munition
- ATS (Medium Range) loitering munition
- Sky Striker loitering munition
- Dhanush artillery gun system
- Advanced Towed Artillery Gun System (ATAGS)
- BrahMos supersonic cruise missile system
- Suryastra Universal Rocket Launcher System
- Akash air defence missile system
- Abhra Medium-Range Surface-to-Air Missile System (MRSAM)
- Drone Shakti Lorry
- Integrated Operational Centre – presentation of Operation Sindoor
- S-400 air and missile defence system

== Flypast ==
The 77th Delhi Republic Day Parade concluded with a grand flypast by the Indian Air Force. A total of 29 aircraft participated in this year's flypast, comprising 16 fighter aircraft, 4 transport aircraft and 9 helicopters. The flypast showcased the Indian Air Force's modern combat capabilities, joint military operations and indigenous defence technologies.

The flypast featured Rafale, Su-30MKI, MiG-29 and Jaguar fighter aircraft of the Indian Air Force, C-130J Super Hercules and C-295 transport aircraft, and the Indian Navy's P-8I maritime reconnaissance aircraft. The helicopters included the ALH Dhruv, Rudra armed helicopter and other operational helicopters. These aircraft and helicopters flew in various formations, including Arjan, Vajrang, Varuna, Vijay, Prahar and Sindoor (Spearhead), demonstrating the joint operational capabilities of the Indian Armed Forces.

At the conclusion of the parade, a special banner inscribed with "Vande Mataram" was displayed in the sky, accompanied by the release of colourful balloons and the national anthem, marking the ceremonial conclusion of the event.

The major aircraft, helicopters and formations featured in the flypast included:

Indian Air Force helicopters carrying the national flag and the Operation Sindoor flag during the 77th Republic Day celebrations at Kartavya Path, New Delhi, 26 January 2026.

Aerial view of the Republic Day Parade marching along Kartavya Path during the 77th Republic Day celebrations in New Delhi, 26 January 2026.

- Rafale multirole fighter aircraft
- Su-30MKI fighter aircraft
- MiG-29 fighter aircraft
- Jaguar deep penetration strike aircraft
- C-130J Super Hercules transport aircraft
- C-295 tactical transport aircraft
- P-8I maritime reconnaissance and anti-submarine warfare aircraft
- ALH Dhruv Advanced Light Helicopter
- Rudra armed helicopter
- Arjan formation
- Vajrang formation
- Varuna formation
- Vijay formation
- Prahar formation
- Sindoor (Spearhead) formation

== Tableaux ==
A total of 31 tableaux from states and union territories, as well as central ministries and departments, were presented along Kartavya Path during the 77th Delhi Republic Day Parade (2026). The tableaux aimed to showcase India's cultural diversity, developmental journey and the theme "Swarnim Bharat: Virasat aur Vikas" (Golden India: Heritage and Development).

The tableaux from various states presented their traditional cultures, folk arts, historical heritage and local development initiatives. Those from union territories highlighted tourism, administrative innovations and regional identities.

The tableaux presented by central ministries and departments highlighted major government initiatives and programmes related to rural development, women's empowerment, financial inclusion, renewable energy, Digital India and scientific innovation.

Some tableaux specifically focused on themes such as India's constitutional journey over 75 years, Janjatiya Gaurav Varsh and the modern achievements of the India Meteorological Department (IMD). Details regarding the announcement and selection of the tableaux were released by the Press Information Bureau (PIB) and other official sources.

Tableaux of states and union territories at the 77th Delhi Republic Day Parade (2026)
State / Union territory	Theme	Image
Assam	Asharikandi – Assam's Terracotta Craft Village	
Chhattisgarh	Vande Mataram – The Mantra of Freedom	
Gujarat	Swadeshi and Self-Reliance	
Himachal Pradesh	Dev Bhoomi, Veer Bhoomi	
Jammu and Kashmir	Handicrafts and Folk Culture	
Kerala	Self-Reliant Kerala	
Manipur	From Agriculture to Global Markets	
Maharashtra	Ganeshotsav and Self-Reliance	
Tamil Nadu	Prosperity through Self-Reliant India	
Rajasthan	Bikaner Usta Art	
Nagaland	Hornbill Festival	
Uttar Pradesh	Bundelkhand Culture	
West Bengal	Contribution to the Indian Independence Movement	
Madhya Pradesh	Devi Ahilyabai Holkar	
Punjab	350 Years of Guru Tegh Bahadur	
Puducherry	Handicrafts and Auroville	

Tableaux of the ministries, departments and services of the Government of India at the 77th Delhi Republic Day Parade (2026)
Ministry / Department / Service	Theme	Image
Indian Air Force (Air Headquarters)	Nation-Building through War – Veterans' Tableau	
Indian Navy (Naval Headquarters)	Prosperity through the Seas	
Department of Military Affairs	Tri-Services Tableau – Operation Sindoor: Victory through Jointness	
Ministry of Culture	Vande Mataram – The Soul Cry of a Nation	
Department of School Education and Literacy	National Education Policy 2020: Advancing Indian School Education towards Viksit Bharat	
Ministry of AYUSH	The System of AYUSH, the Mantra of Health	
Ministry of Home Affairs (NDMA and NDRF)	Bhuj Earthquake: 25 Years of Resilience	
Ministry of Home Affairs (BPRD)	People-Centric Justice System – Three New Criminal Laws, 2023	
Central Public Works Department	150 Years of Vande Mataram	
Ministry of Information and Broadcasting	Bharat Gatha: Shruti, Kriti, Drishti	
Ministry of Panchayati Raj	SVAMITVA Scheme – From Self-Reliant Panchayats to a Prosperous and Self-Reliant India	
Ministry of Power	Prakash Ganga: Powering a Self-Reliant and Developed India	
Ministry of Skill Development and Entrepreneurship	Empowered by Skills: Building a Self-Reliant, Future-Ready India	

== Cultural Performances ==
President Droupadi Murmu hosting the At Home reception at Rashtrapati Bhavan following the Republic Day parade, New Delhi, 2026.

Cultural performances formed an important part of the 77th Delhi Republic Day Parade, held at Kartavya Path on 26 January 2026. The cultural programme was organised around the broader themes of "Swatantrata Ka Mantra – Vande Mataram" and "Samriddhi Ka Mantra – Viksit Bharat", reflecting the 150th anniversary of India's national song, Vande Mataram, and the country's cultural diversity.

The main cultural presentation, titled "Vande Mataram: The Eternal Resonance of Bharat", brought together approximately 2,500 artists representing all the States and Union Territories of India. Curated by the Sangeet Natak Akademi in collaboration with the North Zone Cultural Centre, Patiala, the performance showcased India's cultural diversity through classical, folk and tribal dance forms.

The presentation depicted India's journey from its spiritual and cultural roots through the sacrifices of freedom fighters to the valour and dedication of the armed forces. Sanskrit mantras, music and coordinated formations were incorporated into the performance, which concluded with a tribute to the national flag. The creative team included music director M. M. Keeravani, lyricist Subhash Sehgal, narrator Anupam Kher and choreographer Santosh Nair, under the supervision of Dr. Sandhya Purecha. Costume design was conceptualised by Sandhya Raman.

A full-dress rehearsal of the cultural performances was held at Kartavya Path on 24 January 2026, ahead of the parade. The rehearsal involved nearly 2,500 artists who were scheduled to perform different cultural segments during the Republic Day celebrations. Some sections of the cultural programme had not been rehearsed during the earlier proceedings because of adverse weather conditions.

The cultural dance presentation "Vande Mataram: The Eternal Resonance of Bharat" received a Special Prize at the Republic Day Parade 2026. The award recognised the presentation curated by the Sangeet Natak Akademi and the North Zone Cultural Centre, which brought together artists from across the country to showcase India's classical, folk and tribal traditions.

== Awards ==
The Ministry of Culture's tableau, which won the Best Tableau award among Central Ministries and Departments at the 77th Republic Day Parade (2026)

Following the 77th Delhi Republic Day Parade, the Ministry of Defence announced the results of the awards for the best marching contingents and tableaux representing States, Union Territories, and Central Ministries and Departments. The winners were selected through assessments by three panels of judges, while a separate online poll conducted on the MyGov portal determined the winners in the Popular Choice category.

=== Jury Awards ===
Under the jury awards, Maharashtra's tableau, themed "Ganeshotsav: A Symbol of Aatmanirbharta", was adjudged the best among the tableaux presented by States and Union Territories. Jammu and Kashmir secured second place for its tableau on "Handicrafts and Folk Dances of Jammu & Kashmir", while Kerala secured third place for its presentation titled "Water Metro & 100% Digital Literacy: Aatmanirbhar Kerala for Aatmanirbhar Bharat".

Among the Central Ministries and Departments, the tableau of the Ministry of Culture, titled "Vande Mataram – The Soul Cry of a Nation", was adjudged the best tableau. Special prizes were awarded to the Central Public Works Department for its tableau commemorating 150 years of Vande Mataram, and to the dance group behind the cultural presentation "Vande Mataram: The Eternal Resonance of Bharat".

In the marching contingents category, the Indian Navy was adjudged the best among the three Services, while the Delhi Police won the award among the Central Armed Police Forces and other auxiliary forces.

=== Popular Choice Awards ===
In the Popular Choice category, the results were determined through an online poll conducted on the MyGov portal, allowing citizens to vote for their preferred tableaux and marching contingents. Among the State and Union Territory tableaux, Gujarat secured first place for "Mantra of Swadeshi – Self-Reliance – Freedom: Vande Mataram", followed by Uttar Pradesh for "Culture of Bundelkhand" and Rajasthan for "Golden Touch of the Desert: Bikaner Gold Art (Usta Art)".

Among the Central Ministries and Departments, the Department of School Education and Literacy received the Popular Choice award for its tableau on "National Education Policy 2020: Rocketing Indian School Education on the Path to Viksit Bharat". In the marching contingents category, the Assam Regiment was voted the best among the three Services, while the Central Reserve Police Force (CRPF) won in the category of Central Armed Police Forces and other auxiliary forces.

The awards were presented by Minister of State for Defence Sanjay Seth on 30 January 2026 in New Delhi. The awards recognised the participating contingents, tableaux and cultural performers for their contributions to the Republic Day celebrations.

== Media Coverage ==
The 77th Delhi Republic Day Parade was broadcast live on Doordarshan on 26 January 2026. Doordarshan National announced the live telecast of the parade from Kartavya Path, while DD News also provided live coverage through its television and digital platforms. The parade was additionally made available through online streaming platforms, including the YouTube channels of Doordarshan, All India Radio (AIR), the Press Information Bureau (PIB) and MyGov.

The Ministry of Defence and other government institutions made photographs, videos and official information related to the parade available through their digital platforms. The Press Information Bureau published a photo album containing 120 photographs documenting the parade at Kartavya Path. The official Rashtraparv portal also maintained a dedicated photo gallery for the 77th Republic Day Parade.

The parade received extensive coverage across television, newspapers and digital news platforms. Reports and visual coverage highlighted its military displays, tableaux, cultural performances and the Indian Air Force flypast. The Ministry of Information and Broadcasting also published official coverage of its tableau, titled "Bharat Gatha: Shruti, Kriti, Drishti", which was presented during the parade.
