= Delhi Republic Day parade =

Parade marking the Republic Day celebrations in India

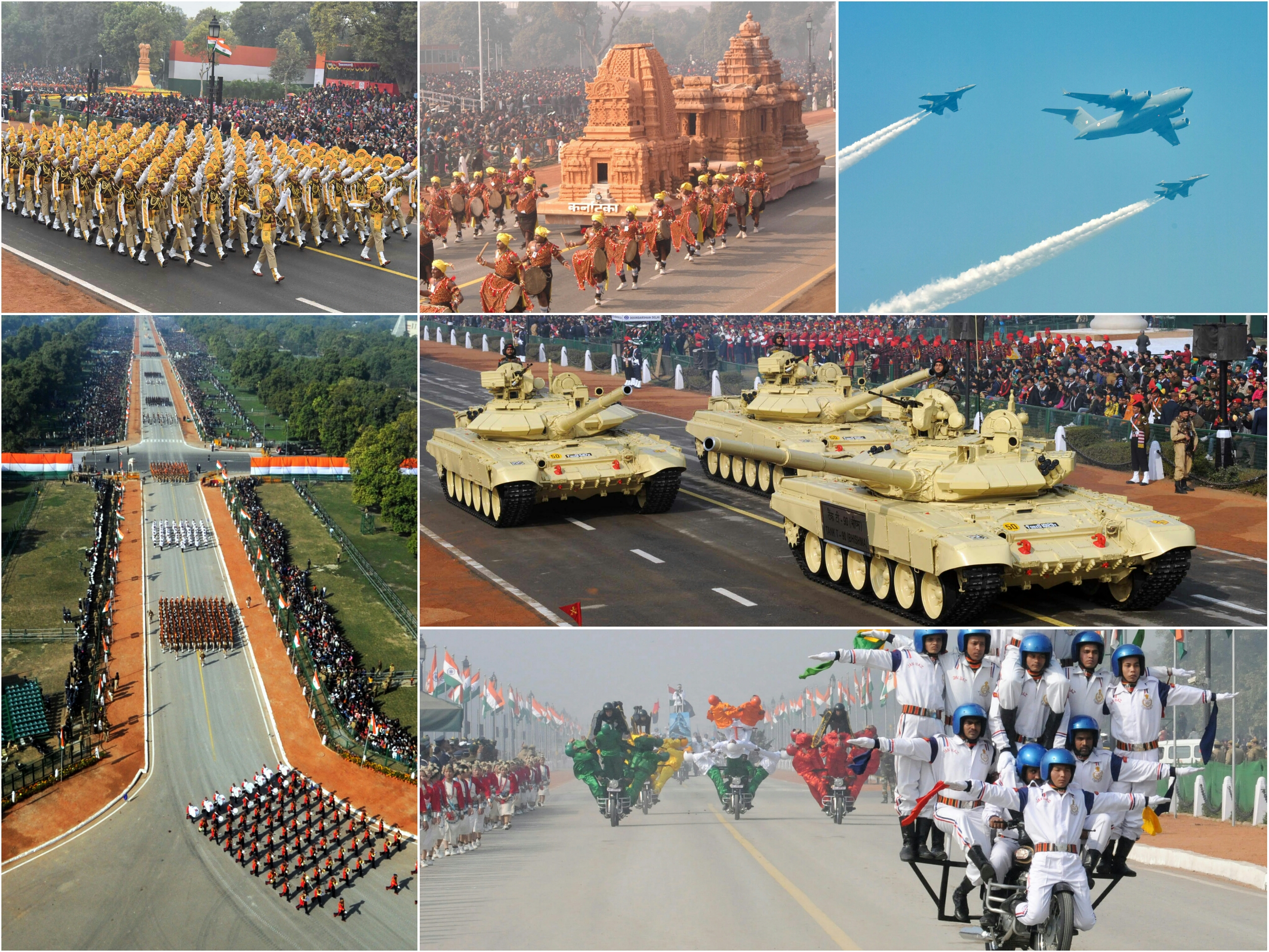
- Clockwise from top left: CISF marching contingent (2017); tableau of Karnataka (2010); a C-17 Globemaster flanked by two Su-30 MKIs (2018); T-90 tanks (2016); daredevil riders of BSF (2014); bird’s eye view of Kartavya Path (2013).
- Genre: National Military And Cultural patriotic parade
- Begins: 26 January
- Ends: 29 January by Retreat Ceremony
- Frequency: Annual
- Locations: New Delhi, India
- Inaugurated: 26 January 1950
- Most recent: 26 January 2026
- Next event: 26 January 2027
- Organiser: Ministry of Defence Ministry of culture
- Website: indianrdc.mod.gov.in

The Delhi Republic Day parade is the largest and most important of the parades marking the Republic Day celebrations in India. The parade takes place every year on 26 January at Kartavya Path, New Delhi. It is the main attraction of India's Republic Day celebrations, which last for three days. The first parade was held in 1950, and it has been held every year since. The cultural pageant is a symbol of a diverse but united India.

The parade marches from the Rashtrapati Bhavan on the Kartavya Path to India Gate and from there to Red Fort. It opens with the unfurling of the national flag by the President of India. This is followed by marching from several regiments of the Army, Navy, and Air Force, along with their bands, and tableaux from various states signifying their cultures are displayed. A beating retreat ceremony signifies the end of the parade.

== History ==
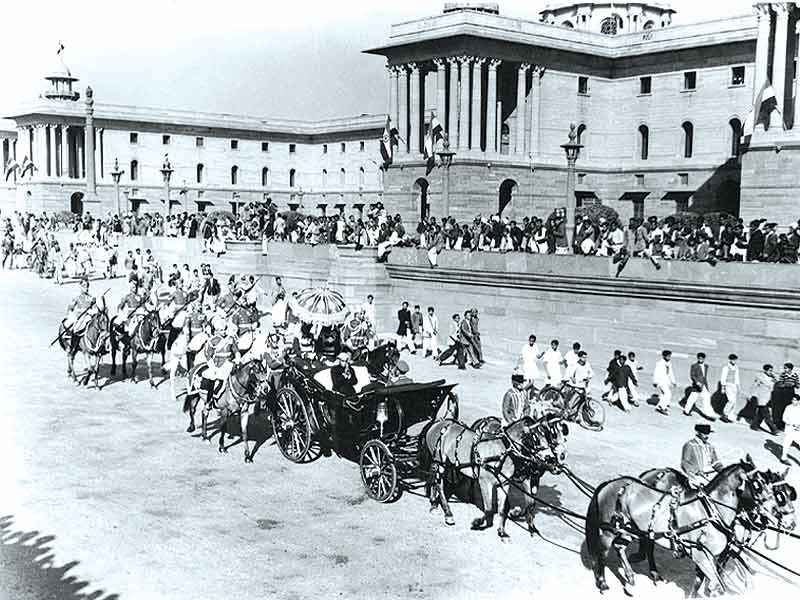
President Rajendra Prasad (in the horse-drawn carriage) during the first parade in 1950.

The first Republic Day Parade was held on 26 January 1950, led by then Brigadier Moti Sagar of the Gorkha Regiment, during which the President of Indonesia Sukarno was the chief guest. The flypast of that parade included aircraft such as Harvards, Consolidated B-24 Liberators, Dakotas, Hawker Tempest, Spitfires and jet planes comprising a total of more than a hundred aircraft. The venue was Irwin Amphitheater, now known as Major Dhyan Chand National Stadium. The parades are the legacy of the British Raj, as a showcase of power to the rival States. Since time immemorial the parades have been a show of strength, mystical prowess of the empires and nation-state, legacy of triumph, and inspiring loyalty to the State. The Prussian State was the pioneer of modern military parades. Indian leaders attached military parades to the Republic Day to commemorate the triumph of a new sovereign strong republic against the colonial power. Consequently, among many other innovations, the unique and grand cultural tableaux were included as an integral part of the parade symbolising a strong and diverse republic, replete with symbols of a larger nationalism incorporating massive regional diversity. With time the colonial symbols have been systematically pushed away, and an Indianisation has happened. The 75th Delhi Republic Day parade]in 2024 was celebrated as a Golden Jubilee milestone, marking a significant occasion in the history of the event.

== Parade ==
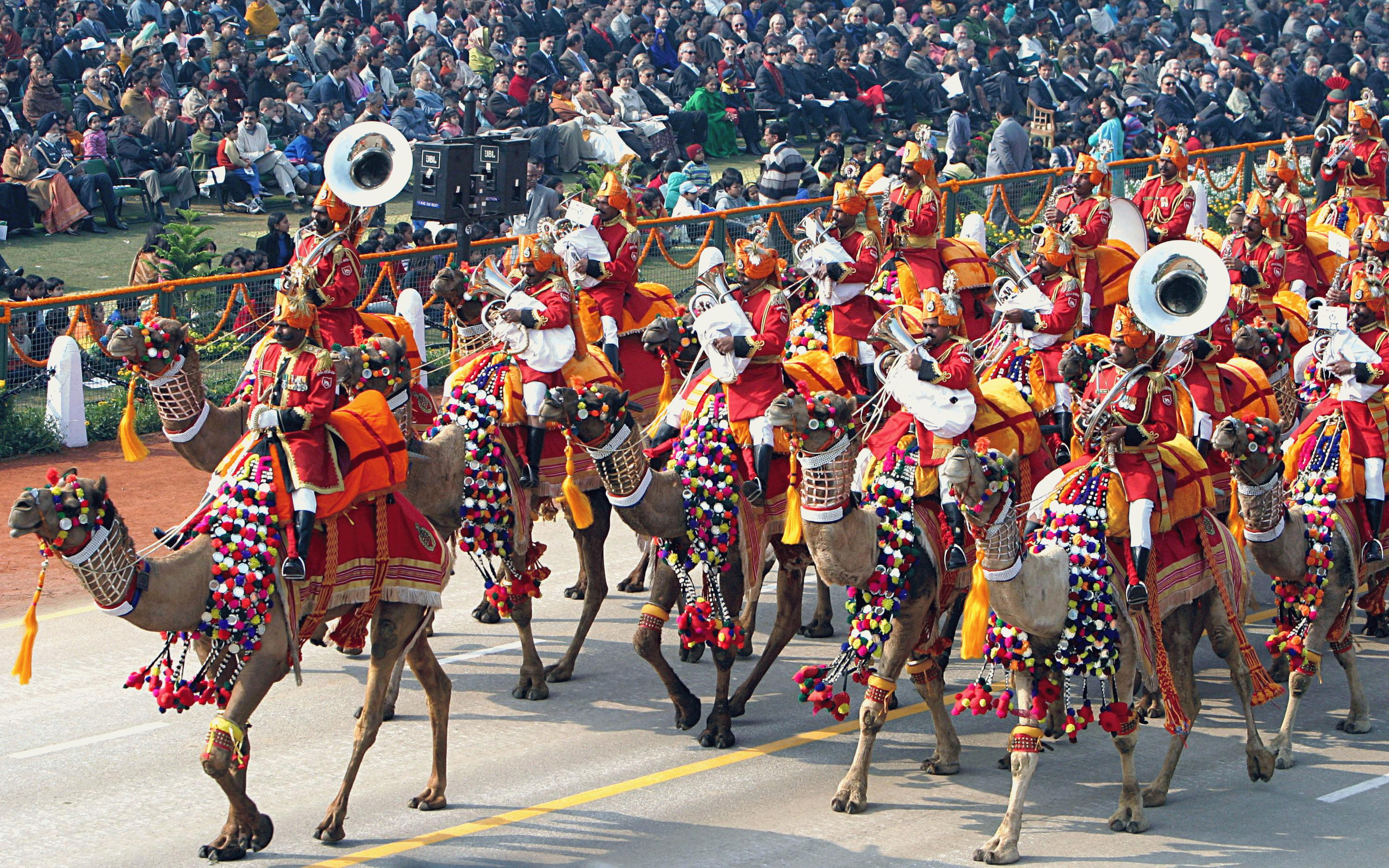
The BSF Camel Contingent during the 2015 parade.

To mark the Republic Day, an annual parade is held in New Delhi, starting at the Rashtrapati Bhavan (the President's residence), and proceeding along the Kartavya Path, past the India Gate. Prior to its commencement, the Prime Minister lays a floral wreath at the National War Memorial (previously at the Amar Jawan Jyoti memorial) at one end of Kartavya Path, which is followed by two minutes silence in the memory of fallen soldiers. Thereafter he/she reaches the main dais at Kartavya Path to join other dignitaries. Subsequently, the President arrives along with the chief guest of the occasion. They are escorted on horseback by the President's Bodyguard.

First, the president unfurls the National flag, as the National Anthem Jana Gana Mana is played, and a 21-gun salute is fired by the Indian Army Regiment of Artillery as the PBG renders the National Salute and its standard is dipped. Next, as the PBG trots off the dais, important awards like the Ashok Chakra and Param Vir Chakra are given away by the President. The President comes forward to award the medals of bravery to the people from the armed forces for their exceptional courage in the field and also the civilians, who have distinguished themselves by their different acts of valour in different situations, either in military, civilian or disaster scenarios. This is followed by the regiments of Armed Forces starting their march past, led by the parade commander and their second in command, followed by living recipients of gallantry medals of the Republic. Following the march past of the armed forces follows the march of personnel belonging to the federal security organizations and the Delhi Police, which marches also on behalf of all territorial, state, city and municipal police forces. Children who are recipients of the National Bravery Award ride past the spectators on colourfully decorated elephants(in the past) or vehicles.

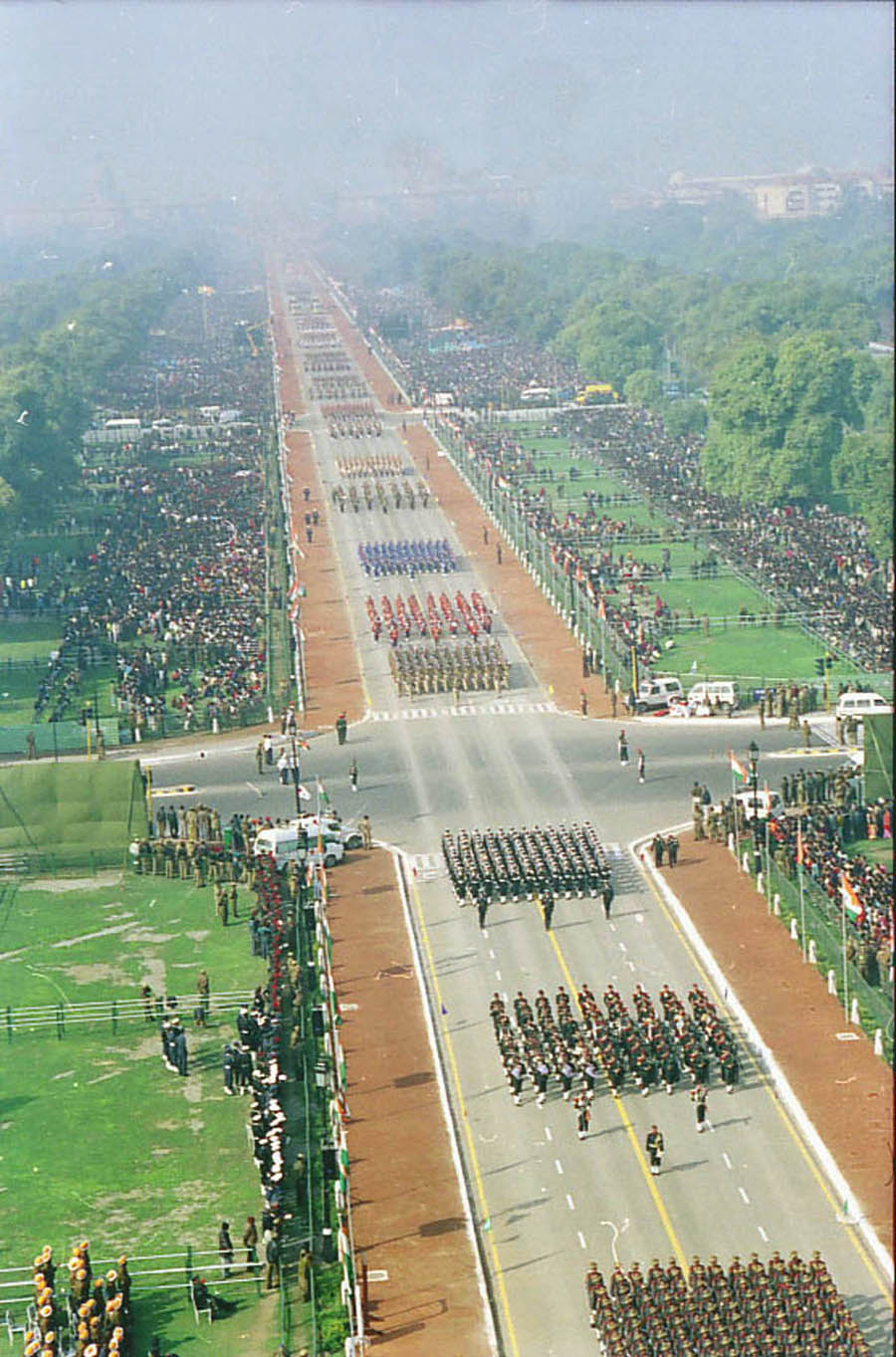
The 2004 parade from India Gate.

18 to 24 different regiments of the Indian Army in addition to the Navy, and Air Force (total nearly 55)) with their bands march past in all their finery and official decorations. The President of India who is the Commander-in-Chief of the Indian Armed Forces, takes the salute. Twelve contingents of various para-military forces of India and other civil forces also take part in this parade. One of the unique sights of the parade is the camel mounted Border Security Force contingent, which is the only camel mounted military force in the world. The best NCC cadets, selected from all over the country consider it an honour to participate in this event, as do the school children from various schools in the capital. They spend many days preparing for the event and no expense is spared to see that every detail is taken care of, from their practice for the drills, the essential props and their uniforms. 22 to 30 floats exhibiting the cultures of the various states and union territories of India, including floats of union ministries and state enterprises are in the grand parade, which is broadcast nationwide on television and radio. These moving exhibits depict scenes of activities of people in those states and the music and songs of that particular state accompany each display. Each display brings out the diversity and richness of the culture of India and the whole show lends a festive air to the occasion. People from different parts of the country enjoy watching the representation of their state rolling along in the parade. Around 1200 schoolchildren present cultural dances as part of the parade. The 2016 Republic Day marked the return of K-9 Dog Squad to the parade after 26 years.

The parade traditionally ends with dare devil motor cycle riding display by motorcycle units of the Armed Forces and civil security services and a flypast by the Indian Air Force jets and helicopters. In 2019, the flypast included aircraft such as Su 30 MKI, Jaguar, Mig 29, C-17 Globemaster and HAL Rudra.

A full dress rehearsal parade is organised on 23 January every year.

To promote gender equality and women empowerment, in 2024, most of the contingents, including the motorcycle acrobat teams were composed entirely of women.

=== Tableaux ===
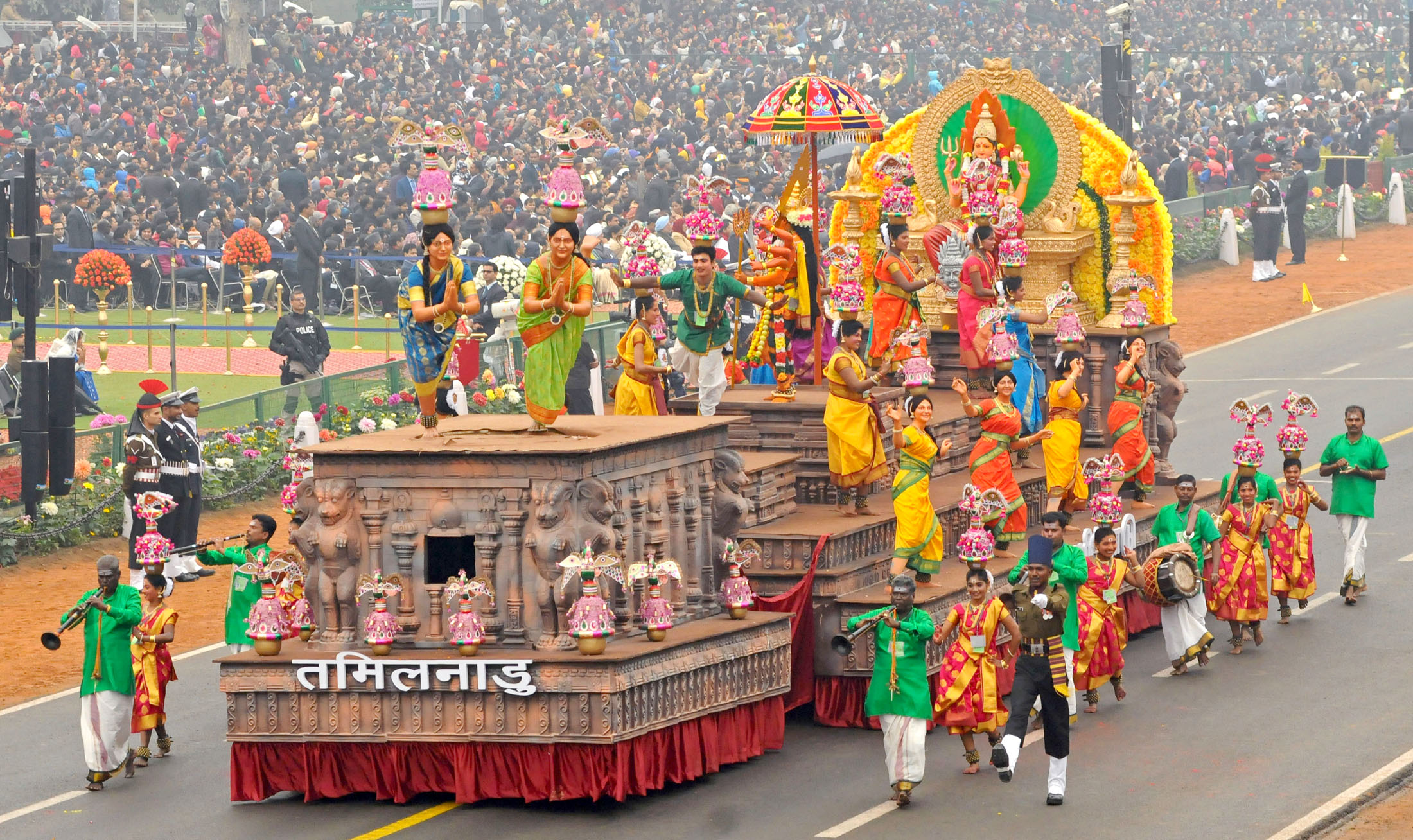
The tableau of Tamil Nadu passes through the Kartavya Path during the 2017 parade.

The selection process of the tableaux is conducted by the Ministry of Defence, which involves a number of guidelines. The ministry recommends that tableaux represent a historical event, heritage, culture, development programmes and environment. The tableaux must not carry any logos and should carry some animation and sound.

Proposals are invited from union ministries and departments of the union government of India, and from states and union territories of India within a fixed deadline. The proposals are examined by a committee of experts from arts fields. The examination process involves 2 rounds. The first round provides suggestions for modifications, after evaluating the sketches and designs. The second round evaluates three-dimensional models, after which a final judgement is passed by the committee. A system was introduced in 2024, which gives every state and union territory a chance to showcase their tableau during the Republic Day parade once every three years.

=== Beating Retreat ===
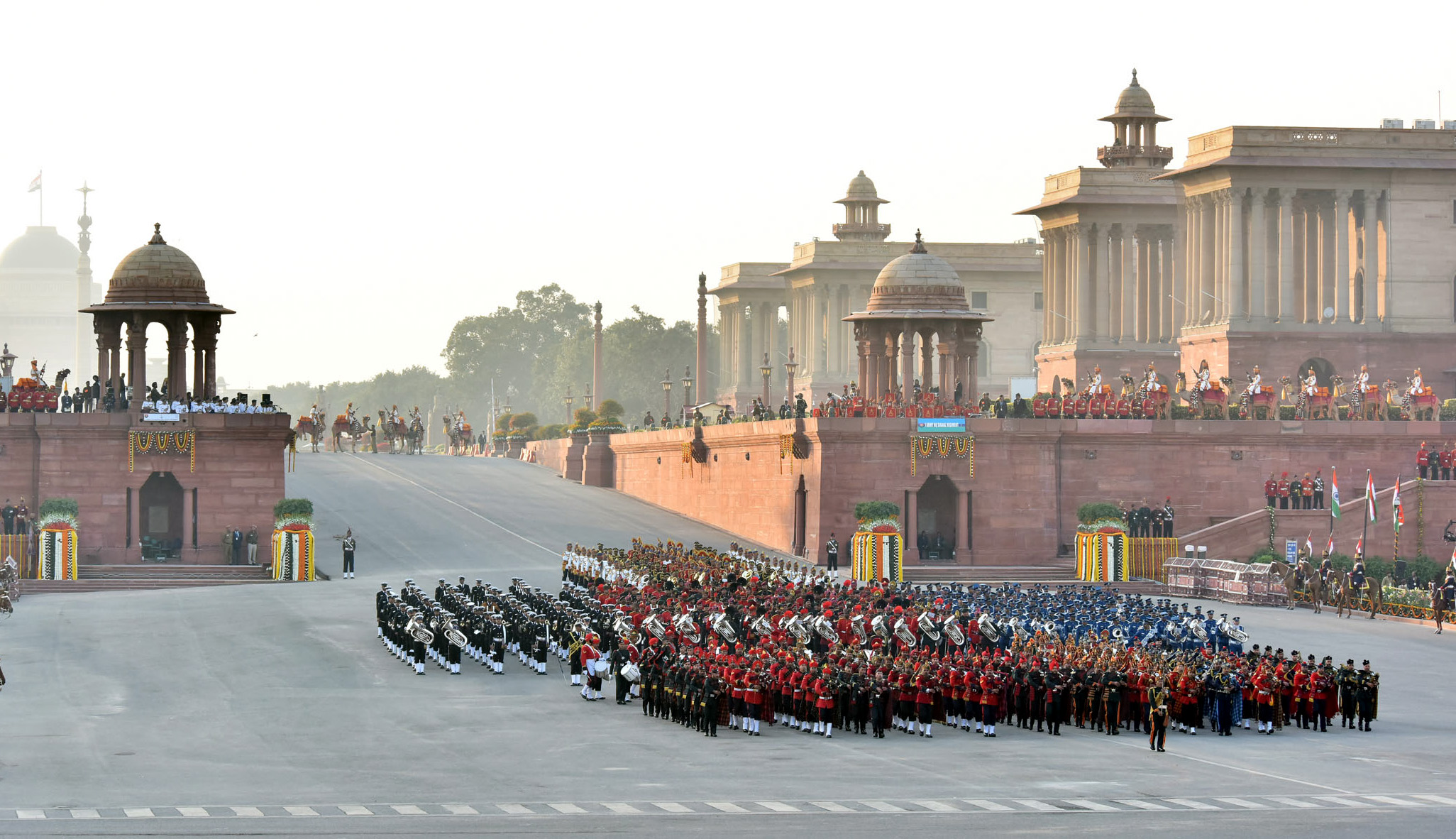
The Beating Retreat ceremony at Vijay Chowk on 29 January 2018.

The Indian Beating Retreat ceremony officially denotes the end of Republic Day festivities. It is conducted on the evening of 29 January, the third day after the Republic Day. It is performed by the bands of the three wings of the military, the Indian Army, Indian Navy and Indian Air Force. The venue is Raisina Hill and an adjacent square, Vijay Chowk, flanked by the north and south block of the Rashtrapati Bhavan (President's Palace) towards the end of Kartavya Path.

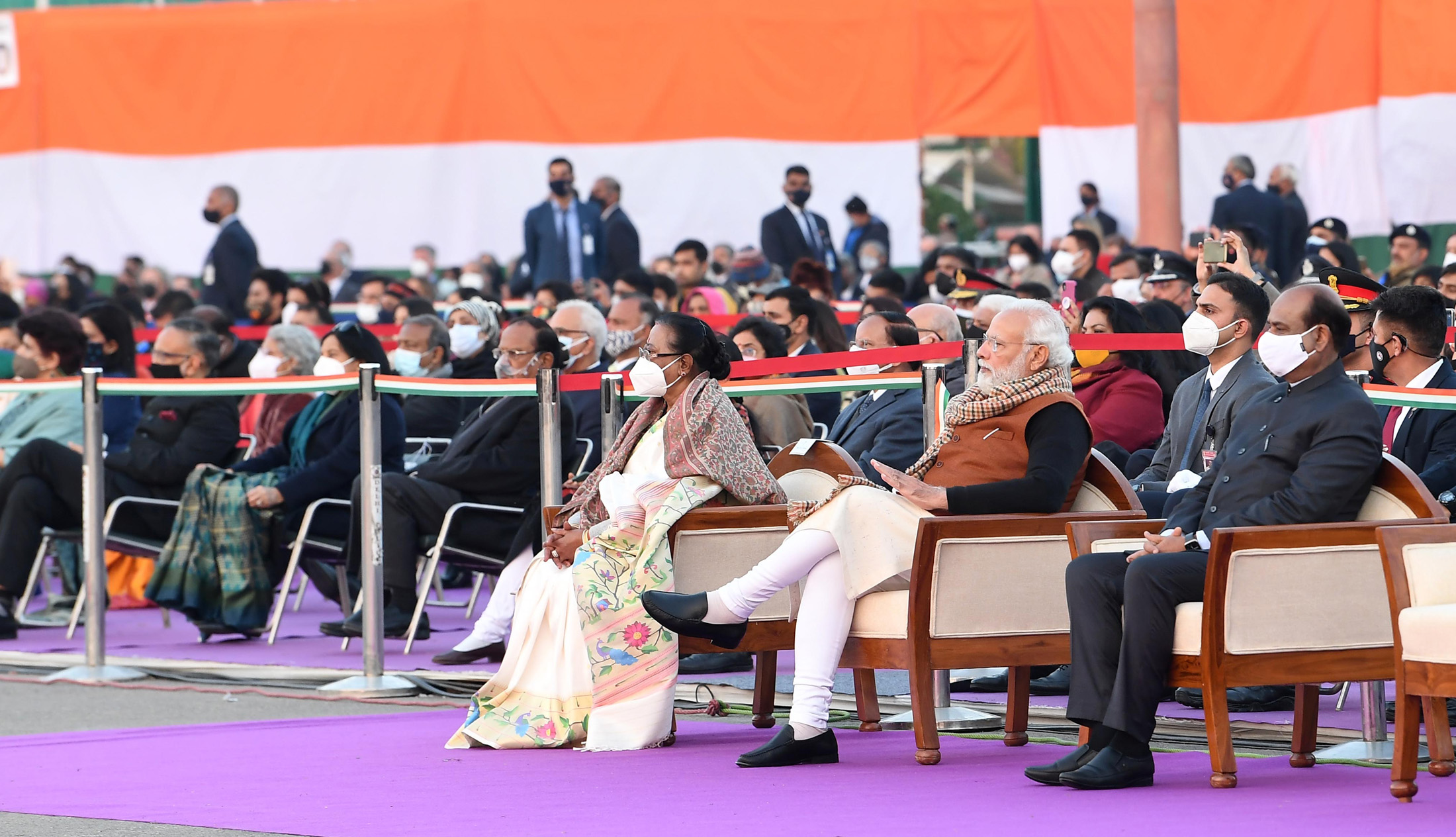
PM Modi and other dignitaries at the Beating Retreat ceremony in 2022.

The Chief Guest of the function is the President of India who arrives escorted by the Presidential Body Guard (PBG), a cavalry unit. When the President arrives, the PBG commander asks the unit to give the National Salute, which is followed by playing of the Indian National Anthem, Jana Gana Mana, by the Army developed the ceremony of display by the massed bands in which Military Bands, Pipe and Drum Bands, Buglers and Trumpeters from various Army Regiments besides bands from the Navy and Air Force take part which play popular tunes like the National Song of India Vande Mataram, Mahatma Gandhi's favourite hymn Vaishnava Jana To, Saare Jahan Se Achcha, Abide With Me and Aye Mere Watan Ke Logo at the end.

Mostly, after Republic Day Celebrations Schools and Colleges Observe Holiday on 27 January.

== Guest contingents ==
In 2016, French Army soldiers and a French Army Band took part in the 67th Republic Day parade. This marked the first time since the beginning of the parade in 1950, that a foreign army contingent marched down the Rajpath during the Republic Day parade.

| Year | Country | Unit | Contingent Details | Photo |
|---|---|---|---|---|
| 2016 | France | 35th Infantry Regiment | 76 soldiers 48-member band | |
| 2017 | United Arab Emirates | United Arab Emirates Presidential Guard | 149 soldiers 35-member band | |
| 2021 | Bangladesh | Bangladesh Armed Forces | 90 soldiers 32-member band | |
| 2023 | Egypt | Egyptian Armed Forces | 144 soldiers 12-member band | |
| 2024 | France | 2nd Foreign Infantry Regiment | 95 soldiers 33-member band | |
| 2025 | Indonesia | Indonesian National Armed Forces | 152 soldiers 190-member band | |
| 2026 | European Union | Defence forces of the European Union | 5 soldiers | |

== Awards ==
=== Best marching contingents ===
| Year | Best Marching Contingent among Services | Best Marching Contingent among CAPFs/other auxiliary forces |
|---|---|---|
| 1983 | National Cadet Corps (Senior Under Officer Ubhay Bharti Trikha) | NA |
| 1991 | Madras Engineer Group (Second Lieutenant Vivek Jaswal) | NA |
| 1994 | Gorkha Regiment (Major J. S. Tanwar) | NA |
| 1995 | Gorkha Regiment | NA |
| 1996 | Brigade of the Guards (Captain Arun Malik) | NA |
| 1997 | Madras Engineer Group (Lieutenant Pranay Dangwal) | Border Security Force |
| 1998 | Bombay Engineer Group (Captain Atul Suryavanshi) | Indo-Tibetan Border Police |
| 1999 | Bihar Regiment | Indo-Tibetan Border Police |
| 2000 | Indian Air Force | Indo-Tibetan Border Police |
| 2001 | Madras Regiment | Delhi Police |
| 2002 | Indian Navy | Delhi Police |
| 2003 | Madras Engineer Group | Delhi Police |
| 2004 | Indian Navy | Indo-Tibetan Border Police |
| 2005 | Sikh Regiment | Delhi Police |
| 2006 | Bihar Regiment | Delhi Police |
| 2007 | Jat Regiment | Central Industrial Security Force |
| 2008 | Rajputana Rifles | Central Industrial Security Force |
| 2009 | Territorial Army | Central Reserve Police Force |
| 2010 | Dogra Regiment | Central Reserve Police Force |
| 2011 | Indian Air Force | Indo-Tibetan Border Police |
| 2012 | Indian Air Force | Border Security Force |
| 2013 | Indian Air Force and Indian Navy | Central Industrial Security Force |
| 2014 | Sikh Light Infantry | Central Reserve Police Force |
| 2015 | Brigade of the Guards and Sikh Regiment | Central Industrial Security Force |
| 2016 | Assam Regiment | Border Security Force |
| 2017 | Madras Engineer Group | Central Industrial Security Force |
| 2018 | Punjab Regiment | Indo-Tibetan Border Police |
| 2019 | Gorkha Regiment | Central Reserve Police Force |
| 2020 | Indian Air Force | Central Industrial Security Force |
| 2021 | Jat Regiment | Delhi Police |
| 2022 | Indian Navy | Central Industrial Security Force |
| 2023 | Punjab Regiment | Central Reserve Police Force |
| 2024 | Sikh Regiment | Delhi Police |
| 2025 | Jammu and Kashmir Rifles | Delhi Police |
| 2026 | Indian Navy | Delhi Police |

=== Best three tableaux ===
| Year | First | Second | Third |
|---|---|---|---|
| 1981 | Goa | | |
| 1988 | Goa | | |
| 1989 | | Goa | |
| 1990 | | Goa | |
| 1991 | Goa | | |
| 1995 | | Goa | |
| 2000 | Goa | | |
| 2001 | Rajasthan | Ministry of Railways | Gujarat and Jammu and Kashmir |
| 2002 | Jammu and Kashmir | | |
| 2003 | Goa | Assam | Uttar Pradesh |
| 2005 | Karnataka | Ministry of Law and Justice | Uttar Pradesh, Jammu and Kashmir and Ministry of Railways |
| 2007 | Odisha | Ministry of Culture | Maharashtra |
| 2008 | Kerala | Karnataka | Ministry of Human Resource Development |
| 2009 | Kerala | Maharashtra | Tamil Nadu and Jammu and Kashmir |
| 2010 | Ministry of Culture | Goa | Chhattisgarh |
| 2011 | Delhi | Karnataka | Rajasthan |
| 2012 | Ministry of Human Resource Development | Goa | Karnataka |
| 2013 | Kerala | Rajasthan | Chhattisgarh |
| 2014 | West Bengal | Tamil Nadu | Assam |
| 2015 | Maharashtra | Jharkhand | Karnataka |
| 2016 | West Bengal | Tripura | Assam |
| 2017 | Arunachal Pradesh | Tripura | Maharashtra and Tamil Nadu |
| 2018 | Maharashtra | Assam | Chhattisgarh |
| 2019 | Tripura | Jammu and Kashmir | Punjab |
| 2020 | Assam | Odisha | Uttar Pradesh |
| 2021 | Uttar Pradesh | Tripura | Uttarakhand |
| 2022 | Uttar Pradesh | Karnataka | Meghalaya |
| 2023 | Uttarakhand | Maharashtra | Uttar Pradesh |
| 2024 | Odisha | Gujarat | Tamil Nadu |
| 2025 | Uttar Pradesh | Tripura | Andhra Pradesh |
| 2026 | Maharashtra | Jammu and Kashmir | Kerala |

=== Best tableaux among the Ministries/Departments ===
| Year | Ministry/Department |
|---|---|
| 2020 | National Disaster Response Force and Ministry of Jal Shakti |
| 2021 | Department of Biotechnology |
| 2022 | Ministry of Education and Ministry of Civil Aviation |
| 2023 | Ministry of Tribal Affairs |
| 2024 | Ministry of Culture |
| 2025 | Ministry of Tribal Affairs |
| 2026 | Ministry of Culture |

=== Popular Choice Awards ===
In 2022, for the first time, the public were allowed to vote for their favourite floats and marching contingents using the MyGov app. The floats with the most votes are declared the winners.

| Year | Best State / Union Territory tableaux | | | Best Marching Contingent among Services | Best Marching Contingent among CAPFs/other auxiliary forces | Best tableaux among the Ministries/Departments |
| Year | First | Second | Third | Best Marching Contingent among Services | Best Marching Contingent among CAPFs/other auxiliary forces | Best tableaux among the Ministries/Departments |
|---|---|---|---|---|---|---|
| 2022 | Maharashtra | Uttar Pradesh | Jammu and Kashmir | Indian Air Force | Central Reserve Police Force | Ministry of Communications |
| 2023 | Gujarat | Uttar Pradesh | Maharashtra | Indian Air Force | Central Reserve Police Force | Ministry of Home Affairs |
| 2024 | Gujarat | Uttar Pradesh | Andhra Pradesh | Rajputana Rifles | CRPF Woman | Ministry of Home Affairs |
| 2025 | Gujarat | Uttar Pradesh | Uttarakhand | Indian Army Corps of Signals | Central Reserve Police Force | Ministry of Women and Child Development |
| 2026 | Gujarat | Uttar Pradesh | Rajasthan | Assam Regiment | Central Reserve Police Force | Deptt. of School Education & Literacy |

== See also ==
- Military parade
- List of diplomatic visits to India
- List of chief guests at Delhi Republic Day parade
- 2021 Indian farmers' Republic Day protest

== Notes ==
1.On each of these occasions, Lady Edwina Mountbatten from United Kingdom was also the official guest for the parade.
2. Duke of Edinburgh Prince Philip also accompanied Queen Elizabeth II during the parade.
3.Danish Prime Minister attended Republic Day in Madras (Chennai).
4.No invitations were sent out possibly due to the demise of Prime Minister Lal Bahadur Shastri on 11 January 1966 in Tashkent. The new government headed by Indira Gandhi was sworn on 24 January 1966 (only two days before the Republic Day).
5.For the first time, the President of India (Sarvepalli Radhakrishnan) could not take the salute at the Republic Day parade due to ill-health. Zahir Shah arrived on 28 January.
6.Attended only the Beating Retreat
7.This marked the first time India invited the EU's top leadership jointly for this honour, signalling a major boost to the India-EU Strategic Partnership.
