= National Media Centre, New Delhi =

Coordinates: 28.6183799°N 77.2169529°E

National Media Centre
- राष्ट्रीय मीडिया केन्द्र
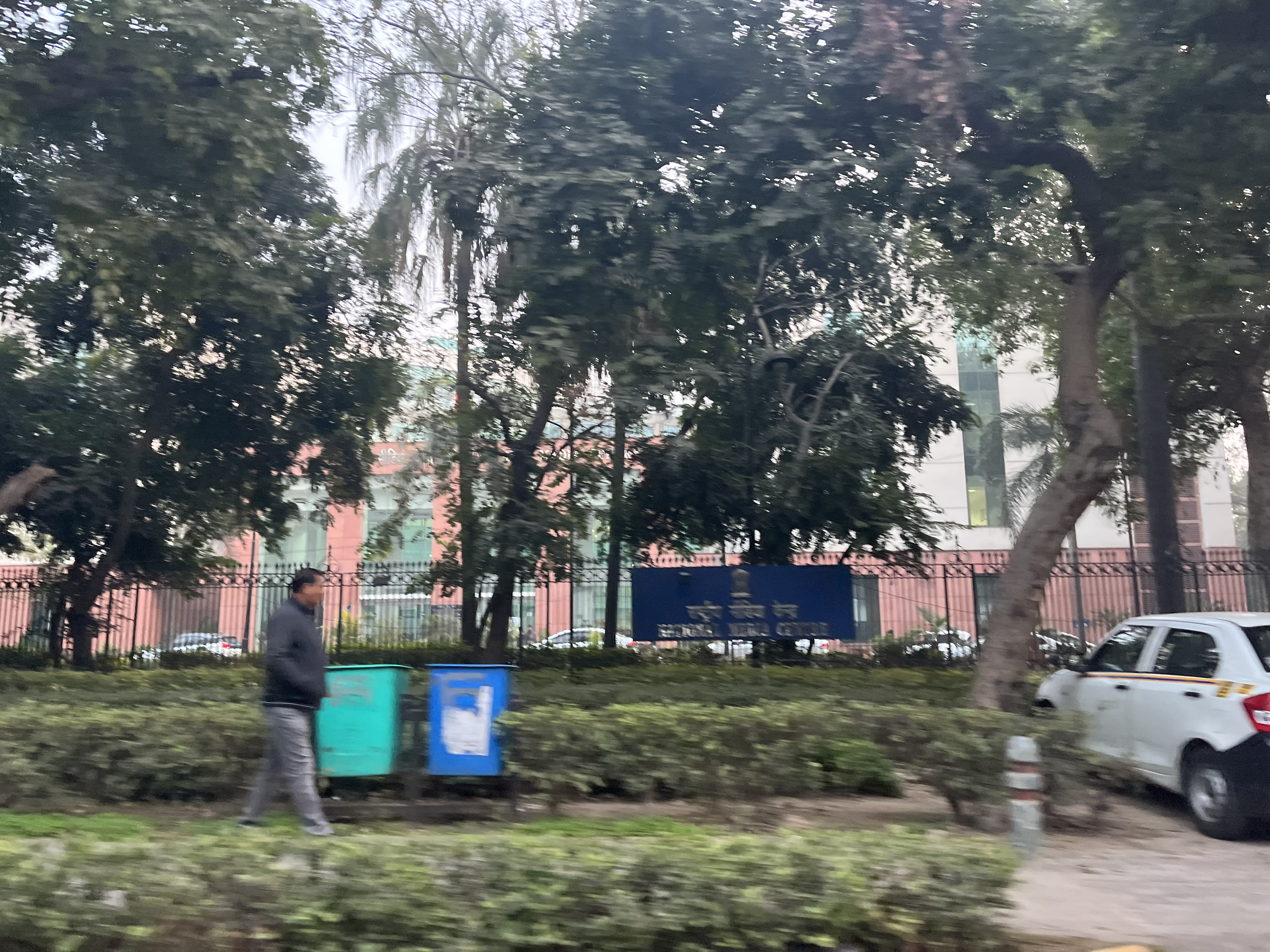
- Interactive map of National Media Centre
- Address: 7-E, Raisina Road,
- Location: New Delhi
- Owner: Government of India
- Capacity: 283
- Type: Media centre

Construction
- Groundbreaking: 5 December 2001
- Opened: 24 August 2013
- Cost: Rs.60 crore

National Media Centre (also known as National Press Centre) is the media centre of Ministry of Information and Broadcasting, Government of India. Its situated on Raisina Road in Central Delhi, close to the Rashtrapati Bhawan and Sansad Bhavan (Parliament House) and important ministries. The foundation ceremony for it was done in 2001. It was inaugurated in 2013. It houses the Press Information Bureau (PIB) and publicity offices of the ministry. It was modeled on media centres in Washington and Tokyo and other capitals.

== History ==
Prime Minister Atal Bihari Vajpayee laid the foundation and performed the bhoomi poojan on 5 December 2001 for the National Press Centre as it was named then. It was built by National Buildings Construction Corporation (NBCC) at a cost of ₹60 crore (US$6.2 million) over a period of three years. and was inaugurated on 24 August 2013 by Prime Minister Manmohan Singh.

== Structure ==
The centre is built on a 1.95-acre plot. The glass facade building consists of four floors with a hall for press conferences that can seat 283 people, a briefing room with 60-person capacity, 24 workstations. It has all modern communication needs. It also has a library, lounge and cafeteria. The press conference hall and media lounge have Wi-Fi access.
