= Press Information Bureau =

Indian government agency

- पत्र सूचना कार्यालय
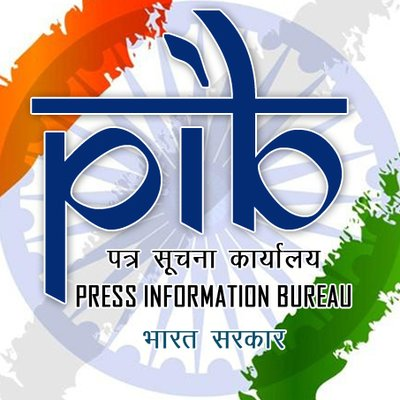

Agency overview
- Formed: June 1919; 107 years ago
- Headquarters: National Media Centre, New Delhi
- Minister responsible: Ashwini Vaishnaw, I&B Minister
- Agency executive: Anupama Bhatnagar, IIS, Director General
- Website: pib.gov.in

The Press Information Bureau, commonly abbreviated as PIB, is a nodal agency of the Government of India under the Ministry of Information and Broadcasting. Based in National Media Centre, New Delhi, Press Information Bureau disseminates information to print, electronic and web media on government plans, policies, programme initiatives and achievements. It is available in 14 Indian official languages, which are Dogri, Punjabi, Bengali, Odia, Gujarati, Marathi, Meitei (Manipuri), Tamil, Kannada, Telugu, Malayalam, Konkani and Urdu, in addition to Hindi and English, out of the 22 official languages of the Republic of India. (Note: The Meitei language (officially called Manipuri) versions of the press releases are presently available in Bengali script, but there is plan of changing the script into Meitei script (Manipuri script) in due course of time.)

The head of PIB is also the Official Spokesperson of the Government of India and holds the rank of Principal Director General (Special Secretary equivalent).

== History ==
The Press Information Bureau was established in June 1919 as a small cell under Home Ministry under the British government. Its main task was to prepare a report on India to be placed before the British Parliament. It was then located in Shimla.

The first head of the publicity cell was Professor L.F. Rushbrook Williams of Allahabad University who was designated Officer on Special Duty. Prof. Williams had earlier worked with Sir Stanley Reed on the Central Publicity Board.

In 1941, J. Natrajan became the first Indian to head the bureau as Principal Information Officer.

The organisation's name was changed to the Press Information Bureau in 1946.

The bureau has been reconstituted many times since independence of India in 1947.

== Structure and function ==
Administratively, the Press Information Bureau is one of the media units working under the Ministry of Information & Broadcasting, Government of India. It is the nodal agency for public communication and media relations for the entire Union Government of India (though some organizations have their own outfits to look after their specialized media and publicity functions, e.g. Ministry of External Affairs and the armed forces).

With headquarters in New Delhi, it now has a nation-wide network of eight regional offices and 34 branch offices. Over 60 information officers are presently in position in the bureau. The bureau has information officers attached to different ministries, constitutional bodies and autonomous organizations of the government of India. They are responsible for information dissemination and unpaid publicity for those organizations.

The bureau issues press releases, features, photographs, infographics and videos for giving information to electronic, print and web media on the following matters:

- Government planning
- Government policies
- Programme initiatives
- Achievements of the government

The bureau has a Press Facilitation unit for press accreditation and facilitation during press conferences and events that are open for the media. At present, about 2500 editors, correspondents, camerapersons and technicians from print, radio, television and web media are accredited.

Its website contains archives of press releases issued by it since 1947. It has also launched the mobile version of its website and a mobile app.

In November 2019, the PIB set up a fact-checking unit to check government related news.

== Heads/government spokespersons ==
No.	Principal information officers	From	To
1.	J. Hennessy	April 1938	December 1941
2.	J. Natrajan	January 1942	July 1945
3.	Pothan Joseph	July 1945	December 1946
4.	A. S. Iyenger	October 1946	December 1948
5.	B. L. Sharma	February 1949	March 1954
6.	M. L. Bhardwaj	March 1954	October 1955
7.	T. R. V. Chari	October 1955	July 1961
8.	M. L. Bhardwaj	July 1961	May 1963
9.	L. R. Nair	May 1963	January 1966
10.	M. L. Bhardwaj	January 1966	July 1971
11.	H. J. D'Penha	July 1971	June 1974
12.	A. R. Baji	December 1974	August 1976
13.	L. Dayal	August 1976	September 1977
14.	G. S. Bhargava	June 1978	April 1980
15.	Wilfred Lazarus	April 1980	April 1982
16.	U. C. Tiwari	April 1982	May 1985
17.	Inna Rammohan Rao	June 1985	January 1992
18.	S. Narendra	February 1992	December 1998
19.	N. J. Krishna	December 1998	October 2002
20.	Sahab Singh	November 2002	February 2004
21.	Shakuntala Mahawal	March 2004	July 2005
22.	Deepak Sandhu	August 2005	January 2006

No.	Principal Directors General (Media & Communication)	From	To
1.	Deepak Sandhu	February 2006	December 2008
2.	Umakant Mishra	December 2008	March 2009
3.	Neelam Kapur	April 2009	August 2014
4.	Frank Noronha	August 2014	April 2018
5.	Sitanshu Kar	May 2018	September 2019
6.	K. S. Dhatwalia	October 2019	February 2021
7.	Jaideep Bhatnagar	March 2021	July 2022
8.	Satyendra Prakash	August 2022	28 February 2023
9.	Rajesh Malhotra	March 2023	August 2023
10.	Manish Desai	September 2023	March 2024
11.	Sheyphali B. Sharan	April 2024	June 2024
12.	Dhirendra K. Ojha	July 2024	July 2025
13.	Anupama Bhatnagar	August 2025	Incumbent

== See also ==
- Ministry of Information and Broadcasting
- Prasar Bharati
