= Electronic Media Monitoring Centre =

Electronic Media Monitoring Centre (EMMC) is a subordinate office under the Indian Ministry of Information and Broadcasting tasked to monitor content of television channels and report on violations of the programme and advertising code.

== History ==
The centre was set up on 9 June 2008, by the Congress led UPA government.

== Working ==
The violations committed by channels are interpreted along the lines of the programme code of the Cable Television Networks Rules (1994) which under Section 6 lists the several "don'ts" that the channels have to conform to, failing which, they shall be issued a show cause notice. The sweeping provisions under the aforementioned act ask channels not to offend good taste, decency or attack religions or communities. Nor should they carry anything that is likely to encourage or incite violence or anything that goes against the maintenance of law and order. Specifically, the code says programmes should not telecast anything amounting to contempt of court; They should contain aspersions on the integrity of the President and the judiciary, criticise, malign, or slander any individual in person or certain groups, segments of social, public and moral life of the country. This is the code that the EMMC follows as it looks for transgressions and airtime to ministers. According to sources, "It is the tracking of ministers that consumes all the time, and prevents a proper monitoring of channels" It is here that officials watch out for television channels, about 600 of them, tripping on the programme code, drawn up by the government, offering the I&B ministry reasons to serve show cause notices on the channels. The EMMC monitors 'around 600' TV channels on a day-to-day basis. The penalties vary, depending on the degree of violation. On 2 March 2015, Rajyavardhan Singh Rathore, the Minister of State for the Information and Broadcasting Ministry in a query stated that there were at least three instances in 2015 against channels over violations of the Programming and Advertising Code: While in one case, an order was issued to take a channel off air for seven days, in another case, a warning was issued. In another instance, a show cause notice was issued. According to Arun Jaitley, over 20 channels were banned for flouting of rules over the last 20 years. In January 2015, an amount of Rs.20 crore was allocated in the financial year 2014-15 for facilitating augmentation of the monitoring capacity of the EMMC. By 2017, the Government hopes to increase the capacity of the EMMC to about 1500 channels.
