= List of Indian Christians =

This page lists notable Indian Christians. The list includes both Indians who lived within India and its predecessor states, and those of Indian ancestry who resided in other countries.

== Freedom fighters ==
- Accamma Cherian, an Indian independence activist from Travancore (Kerala) popularly known as the Jhansi Rani of Travancore
- Ignacio Pinto, leader of the 1787 revolution against Portuguese rule in India known as the Conspiracy of the Pintos
- K. C. Mammen Mappillai
- Titusji The only Christian to take part in Dandi March
- Kali Charan Banerjee (1847–1902)
- K. T. Paul Freedom fighter and first Indian leader of YMCA in India
- Krishna Mohan Banerjee
- Amrit Kaur
- Harendra Coomar Mookerjee
- Pandita Ramabai
- S. K. Rudra
- Madhusudan Das

== Business ==
- M. G. George Muthoot, Chairman of Muthoot Group
- Joy Alukkas, Indian Entrepreneur
- Sunny Varkey, Entrepreneur and Founder of GEMS Education
- Jose Alukkas
- K. M. Mammen Mappillai, Founder of MRF
- Sabu M Jacob, managing director, Kitex Garments Limited
- Santhosh George Kulangara, Founder of Safari TV
- Noble Babu Thomas, Film Producer
- Annamma Mathew, Founder of Vanitha
- Mathai George Muthoot, Indian Businessman
- Victor Menezes, Indian Banker
- Mammen Mathew, Chief Editor, Malayala Manorama
- Ivan Menezes, CEO of Diageo
- K. M. Mathew
- Francisco D'Souza, Former CEO and Vice Chairman of Cognizant
- Gerson da Cunha, advertising professional who was also a stage and film actor, social worker, and author
- A. V. Thomas, founding owner of The A.V.T. Group of companies, a leading family-owned business group in South India based in Chennai.
- Kurien K Varghese Chief Executive Officer, VisionFund India Private Limited

== Politicians, activists and Indian Civil Service ==
- C Joseph Vijay, first Christian chief minister of Tamil Nadu
- Ajit Jogi, first Chief Minister of Chhattisgarh
- John Matthai, Minister of Railways in First Cabinet of Independent India.
- A. K. Antony, Former Indian defence minister.
- Sonia Gandhi, is an Italian Indian politician mother of politicians Rahul Gandhi, Priyanka Gandhi and wife of late husband former Prime Minister of India Rajiv Gandhi.
- George Fernandes, He was an Indian trade unionist, statesman, journalist, freethinker and former Indian defence minister.
- K. M. George (politician), Founder of Kerala Congress
- John Brittas, is an Indian politician, journalist, managing director of Kairali TV and Kairali News (Malayalam Communications Ltd.) and former Business Head of Asianet Communications. He was elected to Rajya Sabha from Kerala as CPI(M) nominee.
- Madhusudan Das, Indian lawyer and social reformer. He was the first graduate and advocate of Orissa (Present Odisha).
- Oommen Chandy, former Chief Ministers of Kerala
- A. J. John, founder leader of Travancore State Congress

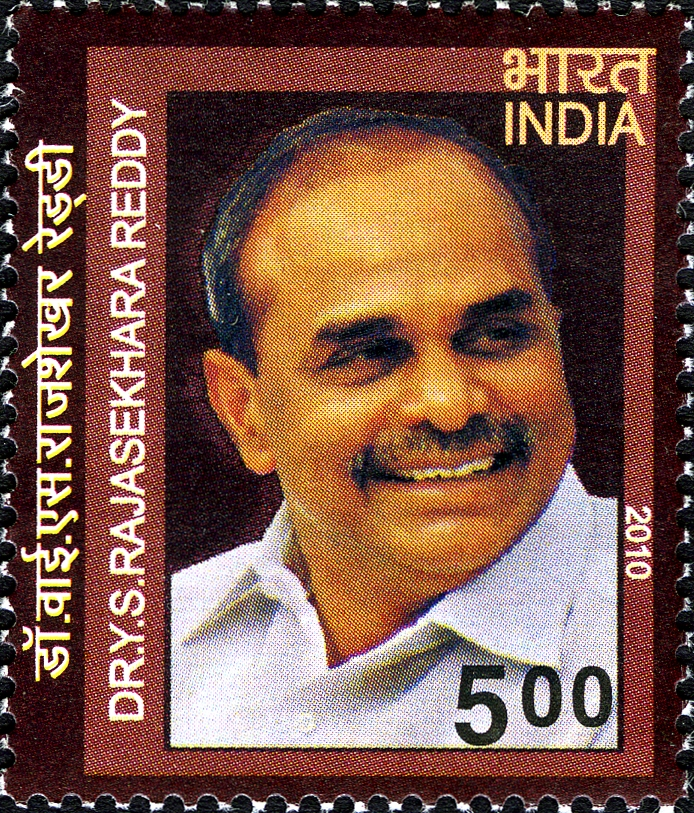
Y. S. Rajasekhara Reddy, two-time Chief minister of Andhra Pradesh portrayed on a stamp

- K M Mani, politician in the Kerala Congress (M)
- Baby John, Politician in Kerala
- M. M. Thomas, Christian theologian and social activist who served as Governor of Nagaland (1990–1992).
- Y. S. Rajasekhara Reddy (1949–2009), former Chief Minister of Andhra Pradesh
- Y. S. Vivekananda Reddy, former M. P. of Kadapa and Minister of Andhra Pradesh
- Y. S. Jagan Mohan Reddy, former Chief Minisiter of Andhra Pradesh
- Thomas Chandy, Former minister, Businessman.
- Joachim Baxla, four-time MP of Alipurduar in West Bengal and Revolutionary Socialist Party politician
- Margaret Alva
- Fr. Stan Swamy, Indian Roman Catholic priest and tribal rights activist
- Sibi George, Malayali Indian Diplomat
- Francisco Luís Gomes, Goan politician
- Wilfred de Souza, Former Chief Minister of Goa
- Sojan Joseph, was born in India but settled in UK. He became Kerala's 1st MP in the UK and First Labor Party win in the Ashford defeat of the Conservative Party (UK) in over 139 years.
- Dinesh D'Souza, is an Indian American right wing political commentator, conspiracy theorist, author and filmmaker.
- Kamala Harris, is an Indian American former Vice President of the United States of America.
- Nikki Haley, is an Indian American politician associated with Republican (United States) party.
- Bobby Jindal, is an Indian American ex governor of Louisiana and politician associated with Republican (United States) party.
- Kevin Thomas (politician), is an Indian American politician associated with Democrats (United States) party.
- Abraham George (politician), is an Indian American politician associated with Republican (United States) party.
- Stanley George, is an Indian American political strategist, political commentator associated with the Republican (United States) party.

== Indian Armed Forces and Indian Police Service ==
- General Sunith Francis Rodrigues, PVSM, VSM, (19 September 1933 - 4 March 2022) was a retired Indian army officer who was Chief of the Army Staff of the Indian Army from 1990 to 1993 and Governor of Punjab from 2004 to 2010.
- Ronald Lynsdale Pereira, (25 May 1923 – 14 October 1993) was a flag officer in the Indian Navy. He served as the ninth Chief of Naval Staff from 1979 to 1982. He is considered to be one of the architects of the modern Indian Navy.
- Lieutenant-General Francis Tiburtius Dias, PVSM, AVSM, Vrc (14 October 1934 – 16 January 2019) was a retired Indian Army officer, who was involved in the Indo-Pakistani War of 1971.
- Major General Ian Cardozo, AVSM, SM, is a former Indian Army officer. During the Indo-Pakistani War of 1971, After the fall of Dhaka, Cardozo stepped on a land mine and his leg was critically injured. Due to non-availability of morphine or pethidine, and absence of medics, his leg could not be amputated surgically. He subsequently used his khukri to amputate his own leg He was the first war-disabled officer of the Indian Army to command a battalion and a brigade.
- Admiral Oscar Stanley Dawson, PVSM, AVSM (13 November 1923 – 23 October 2011) was a four-star admiral in the Indian Navy. He served as the 11th Chief of the Naval Staff from 1 March 1982 to 30 November 1984. He was the Director of Naval Operations during the Indo-Pakistan War of 1971. After retirement, Admiral Dawson served as the Indian High Commissioner to New Zealand
- Julio Rebeiro, Padma Bhushan, Commissioner of Police Mumbai, Director General Central Reserve Police Force, Director General of Police Gujarat, Director General of Police Punjab, Indian Ambassador to Romania
- Sushil Kumar (admiral), PVSM, UYSM, AVSM, NM (died 27 November 2019) was an Indian Navy Admiral who served as Chief of Naval Staff of the Indian Navy.
- Captain Keishing Clifford Nongrum, MVC (7 March 1975 – 1 July 1999) was an Indian Army officer of 12 Jammu and Kashmir Light Infantry. He was posthumously awarded the Maha Vir Chakra, India's second-highest gallantry award, for exemplary valor in combat during operations in the Kargil War in 1999.
- Alexander Jacob IPS, retd DGP, Kerala Police
- Hormis Tharakan IPS, former chief of the Research and Analysis Wing (R&AW), retd DGP, Kerala Police
- Jacob Punnoose IPS, retd DGP, Kerala Police
- Lance Naik Albert Ekka Param Vir Chakra was an Indian soldier. He was killed in action in the Battle of Gangasagar, during the Indo-Pakistan War of 1971[1] He was posthumously awarded India's highest military award, the Param Vir Chakra, for his valour in the face of the enemy

== Entertainment/Cinema ==
- J. C. Daniel (28 November 1900 – 27 April 1975), was an Indian filmmaker who is considered as the father of Malayalam cinema.
- Janalynn Castelino, Pop singer-songwriter, record producer and doctor of Italian-Indian origin
- Divine, Indian hip-hop rap singer
- Katrina Kaif, Indian Bollywood actress
- John Abraham, Indian former model, Bollywood actor and enterpreneur
- Samantha Ruth Prabhu, South Indian Tollywood film actress
- Abish Mathew, Indian Comedian and YouTuber
- Ruben, Indian film editor
- Aju Varghese, Nasrani Mappila actor and producer
- Ian D'Sa, Canadian Guitarist
- Vikrant Massey, Indian actor who is well known for his versatility acting in Bollywood Hindi films.
- Barry John (theatre director), is an Indian theatre director, actor and acting coach who has successfully coached several film stars like Shah Rukh Khan, Dulquer Salmaan, Rana Daggubati and Freida Pinto.
- Faye D'Souza, Indian journalist and television news anchor.
- Suresh Peters, Indian singer, rapper, and musician
- Bosco-Caesar, Indian Bollywood choreographers
- John Kokken, Indian Tollywood Malayali actor
- Luke Coutinho, Indian entrepreneur, author and lifestyle guru.
- Jennifer Winget, Indian soap opera actress and television host
- Basil Joseph, Nasrani Mappila director and actor
- Esther Anil, Malayali actress
- Tara Anne Fonseca, Former Indian model and Miss Asia Pacific 1973 pageant contest title holder.
- Lekha Washington, Anglo Indian actress, artist and product designer.
- Hazel Keech, Actress, female model and wife of former Indian professional cricketer Yuvraj Singh.
- Diana Hayden, Former female model and Miss World 1997 pageantry winner.
- Frank Fernand, was an Indian filmmaker and musician known for Goan Konkani cinema work.
- Chic Chocolate, was an Indian trumpeter and did lead a Jazz band in Taj Mahal Hotel.
- Lara Dutta, Indian Actress, wife of former tennis player Mahesh Bhupathi and was also former female model and pageant winner.
- Denzil Smith, Anglo Indian film, stage actor and producer
- Anthony Gonsalves, was an Goan music composer, music arranger and music teacher.
- Benjamin Gilani, is an Indian television and theatre actor.
- Pearle Maaney, Indian actress, lyricist, YouTuber and television presenter
- Esther Victoria Abraham, Former female model, Miss India 1947 pageantry winner as she is officially the first Miss India winner after Independence from colonial British Raj rule and formation of new independent India.
- Kenny Sebastian, Indian Comedian and digital social media Influencer
- Nafisa Joseph, was a former female model, video jockey and Miss Universe 1997 beauty pageant finalist.
- Archana Kavi, Indian actress and television host
- Marc Robinson, Indian supermodel
- Alyque Padamsee, was an Indian theatre personality and ad film maker.
- Pearl Padamsee, was an Indian theatre personality as a stage actress, director and producer.
- Vedika Pinto, Indian female model, dancer and actress.
- Ivan Sylvester Rodrigues, Indian theatre artist and film actor based in Mumbai.
- Keith Sequeira, Indian actor, former supermodel and VJ.
- Luke Kenny, Indian actor, model, film director, producer, music composer, musician, DJ and VJ of Irish ancestry.
- Naveen Andrews, Anglo-American actor whose parents are from Kerala.
- Elnaaz Norouzi, International film actress.
- Innocent, Malayali actor
- Tiger Prabhakar, Kannada cinema actor
- Vijay, Indian actor
- Vikram, Indian actor
- Johnny Lever, Indian actor and comedian.
- Jamie Lever, Comedian and daughter of great Indian actor and comedian Johnny Lever.
- Jimmy Moses, Comedian
- Nelson Dilipkumar, Tamil film industry director and screenwriter
- Christabelle Howie, Former Indian female supermodel and beauty pageant title holder.
- Terence Lewis (choreographer), Indian dancer, singer and choreographer
- Kunchacko Boban, Indian actor
- Lymaraina D'Souza, Counseling Therapist, former pageant winner and female model.
- Babu Antony, Malayali actor
- Evelyn Sharma, Actress and model
- Kalki Koechlin, Actress
- Annu Antony, Malayali actress
- Tamara Moss, Indian female model
- Nifa and Nishan Hindes, Twin female Models
- Nathalia Kaur, Female Model and actress
- Erica Fernandes, Indian actress
- Alencier Ley Lopez, Malayali actor
- Krissann Barretto, Indian actress, model and reality TV show star
- Nargis Fakhri, American actress and model
- Lal, Malayali director and actor
- Lalu Alex, Nasrani Mappila actor
- Nagma, movie actress and politician.
- Lal Jose, Indian Film Director
- Vijay Antony, Indian Actor, music composer, playback singer and producer
- Gavin Packard, Anglo Indian actor of Irish American ancestry and origin
- Serin George, Indian female model and digital creator
- Elizabeth Anita Reddi, Indian female model
- Sarah Jane Dias, Indian actress, VJ and model
- Rochelle Rao, Anglo Indian female model
- Lauren Gottlieb, Dancer and actress
- Natalie Di Luccio, Classical crossover singer and wife of Raghu Ram
- Honey Rose, Malayali actress
- Nataša Stanković, Actress, model and dancer
- Freida Pinto, Indian - American Actress
- Jeniffer Piccinato, Model and actress
- Rachel David, Malayali actress
- Carol Gracias, Indian female supermodel
- Krystle D'Souza, Indian TV show actress
- Nivin Pauly, Nasrani Mappila actor
- Rimi Tomy, Malayali actress and singer
- Sathyan (actor), Malayali Actor, Police inspector, soldier (Viceroy's Commissioned Officer), clerk, school teacher
- Candice Pinto, Indian female model
- Miya George, Malayali actress
- Kelly Gale, Female model
- Stebin Ben, Indian playback singer
- Jason Shah, Actor and Fitness model
- Lissy (actress), Malayali actress and wife of acclaimed Film Director Priyadarshan.
- Kalyani Priyadarshan, Malayali actress and daughter of Lissy (actress).
- Angela Jonsson, Female model and actress
- Cindy Bishop, Female model, beauty pageant winner and activist
- Andrea Jeremiah, Indian Actress and Playback Singer
- Nina Manuel, Indian model, television host and VJ
- Tovino Thomas, Nasrani Mappila actor
- Jean Paul Lal, Actor and Director
- Anu Emmanuel, Malayali Actress
- Reita Faria, Indian physician and female model
- Navodaya Appachan, Indian Film Producer and Entrepreneur
- Joju George, South Indian Actor
- Siju Wilson, Indian Actor
- Anna Ben, Indian actress
- Raiza Wilson, Indian actress
- Diana Penty, Indian actress
- Diandra Soares, Indian model, fashion designer and television host
- Waluscha De Sousa, Indian actress and model
- Elli Avram, Actress
- Reba Monica John, Indian actress
- Roshan Mathew, Film Actor
- Russell Peters, Comedian
- Rosshan Andrrews, Film Director
- Anju Kurian, Malayali actress
- Gail Nicole Da Silva, Indian female model
- Alphonse Puthren, Indian Film Director and Writer
- Shine Tom Chacko, Indian Actor
- Fleur Ezekiel, Indian female model
- Madonna Sebastian, Malayali actress
- Asin, Indian Actress
- Chris Perry, Indian Musician and Film Producer
- Nelson Dilipkumar, Film Director
- Lisa Haydon, Indian Actress and model
- Sebastian D'Souza, Music Arranger
- Nivetha Thomas, Malayali actress
- Amala Paul, South Indian film Actress
- Rimi Tomy, Indian Singer and Actress
- Anchal Joseph, Female model
- Asha Leo, Female Model
- Dhanya Mary Varghese, Malayali actress
- Bruna Abdullah, Actress and model
- Malaika Arora, Indian actress and VJ
- Amrita Arora, Former Indian actress and model
- Lisa Ray, Actress
- Mayanti Langer, Indian sports journalist, sportscaster, anchor/ emcee, TV presenter/ broadcaster. Wife of Cricketer Stuart Binny and daughter-in-law of Roger Binny.
- Nicole Faria, Indian female model
- Gia Johnson, Female Model
- Gaelyn Mendonca, Indian actress, model, television presenter and VJ
- Genelia D'Souza, Indian Actress
- Anukreethy Vas, Actress, Model and beauty pageant holder
- Meera Jasmine, Indian Actress
- Amy Jackson, Actress and model
- Adline Castelino, Indian female Model and beauty pageant winner
- Regina Cassandra, Indian Actress and model
- Ileana D'Cruz, Indian born Portuguese actress
- Catherine Tresa, Actress
- Oviya, Tamil Actress
- Remo D'Souza, Indian dance choreographer, Film producer and director
- Shalini, South Indian Actress
- Richard Rishi, Indian Actor
- Midhun Manuel Thomas, Indian film director and screenplay writer
- Vincy Aloshious, South Indian Actress who works in Malayalam films
- Sandra Thomas, South Indian film producer and actress
- Rojin Thomas, South Indian film director and screenplay writer
- Listin Stephen, Indian film producer and distributor
- Anto Joseph, South Indian film producer, distributor and cinema exhibitor
- Lijo Jose Pellissery, Indian film director and actor working in Malayalam industry
- Lijin Jose, South Indian film director
- Shamlee, South Indian Actress
- Deborah Priya Henry, Female former model activist social worker
- Dino Morea, Indian actor and model
- Vivian Dsena, Indian reality TV, soap opera actor and model
- Nayanthara, South Indian film actress
- Remo Fernandes, Indian born Portuguese singer and musician
- Ester Noronha, Indian actress and singer
- Kim Sharma, Indian former model and Bollywood actress
- Tara D'Souza, Indian actress and female model
- Monisha Blessy, Indian Tamil film industry actress
- Malishka Mendonsa, Indian radio personality and actress
- Anisha Ambrose, Indian south indian actress and model
- Amalda Liz, Indian Malayalam film actress
- Jewel Mary, Indian Malayalam film actress and television presenter
- Niti Taylor, Indian Hindi television soap opera actress
- Vaishnavi Macdonald, Indian Hindi film and television actress
- Kaziah Liz Mejo, South Indian female model and pageant winner.
- Nikhil D'Souza, Indian singer and songwriter
- Virginia Rodrigues (actress), Indian actress and author
- Daniel Fernandes (comedian), Indian stand-up comedian who is known for his dark and surreal style of comedy.
- Jonathan Gaming, Professional esports athlete, video gamer, YouTuber and social media influencer

== Science, technology and healthcare ==
- Thomas Anantharaman, computer statistician specializing in Bayesian inference.
- Thomas Zacharia, computational scientist.
- Mathew Kalarickal, Indian cardiologist and also known as Father of angioplasty in India.
- Verghese Kurien, Indian dairying engineer, social entrepreneur and Father of White Revolution (India) in India.
- Brenton M Jerry, Software Developer and Information Technology consultant.
- Jacob Chandy, Indian Neurosurgeon also known as Father of neurosurgery in India.
- K. A. Abraham, interventional cardiologist and a medical writer. Chief Cardiologist at the Southern Railway Headquarters Hospital, Chennai, and Chief Medical Director of the Southern Railways
- Mammen Chandy, was involved in establishing the first bone marrow transplantation program in India at Christian Medical College, Vellore. He was awarded Padma Shri.

== Sports ==
- Michael Ferreira, three-time Billiards Amateur World Champion.
- Vijay Hazare, Cricketer
- Tinu Yohannan, Former Indian cricketer from Kerala.
- Roger Binny, Indian cricketer, part of Indian squad that won the 1983 Cricket World Cup Final
- Steven Dias, Former Indian footballer and current football coach
- Abey Kuruvilla, Former Indian cricketer
- Noel David, Former Indian cricketer
- Sunil Valson, Former Indian World Cup 1983 winning cricketer
- Seriton Fernandes, Indian footballer
- Vinod Kambli, cricketer
- Mahesh Bhupathi, professional tennis player
- Jimmy George, volleyball player
- Anju Bobby George, Indian former female Athlete from Kerala
- Robert Bobby George, Indian former engineer, triple jump athlete and coach, husband of ex female athlete Anju Bobby George.
- Leander Paes, Indian legendary professional tennis athlete.
- Vece Paes, Indian ex field hockey player and father of Leander Paes.
- Jennifer Paes, Indian female ex basketball player and mother of Leander Paes.
- Brandon Fernandes, Indian footballer
- Deep Grace Ekka, Indian field hockey player.
- Albino Gomes, Indian footballer.
- Romeo Fernandes, Indian footballer.
- Cavin Lobo, Indian footballer
- Milagres Gonsalves, Indian footballer
- Jaison Vales, Indian footballer
- Keegan Pereira, Indian footballer
- Godwin Franco, Goan Indian footballer
- Anthony Barbosa, Goan footballer
- Luis Barreto, Indian former footballer
- Keenan Almeida, Indian professional footballer.
- Lenny Rodrigues, Indian professional footballer.
- Francis Fernandes, Indian footballer.
- Sheldon Jackson (cricketer), Indian cricketer
- Bryce Miranda, Indian professional footballer
- Jinson Johnson, Indian Athletics track athlete
- Sanson Pereira, Indian professional footballer
- Mary Kom, Indian Boxer
- Dipika Pallikal, She is the first Indian to break into the top 10 in the PSA Women's rankings.
- Angel Mary Joseph, Indian former track and field athlete.
- Viren Rasquinha, Indian former professional field hockey athlete and national team captain.
- Robin Singh (footballer), Indian footballer
- Climax Lawrence, Indian former footballer
- Clifford Miranda, Indian footballer
- Anthony Fernandes (footballer), Indian former ex footballer and current assistant coach of Mumbai City FC.
- Godfrey Pereira, Indian former ex footballer and current head coach manager of Air India FC.
- Sachin Baby, Indian cricketer who plays for Kerala domestic cricket team.
- Leander D'Cunha, Indian professional footballer
- Treesa Jolly, Indian female badminton player
- Royston Dias, Mumbai based Indian professional cricketer
- Liston Colaco, Indian professional footballer
- Jeswin Aldrin, Indian athletics field athlete
- Saviour Gama, Indian footballer
- Lovlina Borgohain, Female boxer who recently participated in the Paris 2024 Olympic Games.
- Reeth Abraham, Indian female former track and field athlete.
- Ancy Sojan, Indian Long jump field athlete.
- Glan Martins, Indian professional footballer
- Jemimah Rodrigues, Indian female Cricketer.
- Shiny Wilson, Indian athlete. She has been a National Champion in 800 metres for 14 years.
- Vincy Barretto, Indian professional footballer
- Jacob Martin (cricketer), Former Indian professional cricketer who used to captain Baroda cricket team.
- Stuart Binny, Indian cricketer and son of Roger Binny.
- Alen Deory, North East Indian professional footballer.
- Rino Anto, South Indian footballer.
- Vineeth Revi Mathew, Indian professional basketball player from Kerala.
- Joaquim Abranches, Indian footballer.
- Denzil Franco, Indian footballer.
- Lester Fernandez, Indian professional footballer.
- Kean Lewis, Indian professional footballer.
- Rupert Nongrum, Indian professional footballer.
- Isaac Vanmalsawma, Indian professional footballer.
- Jovel Martins, Indian professional footballer.
- Alber Gonsalves, Indian professional footballer.
- Bruno Colaço, Indian professional footballer.
- Alwyn George, Indian professional footballer.
- Shilton D'Silva, Indian professional footballer.
- Wayne Vaz, Indian professional footballer.
- Justin Stephen, Indian professional footballer.
- Clyde Fernandes, Indian professional footballer.
- Collin Abranches, Indian professional footballer.
- Beevan D'Mello, Indian professional footballer.
- Anthony D'Souza, Indian professional footballer.
- Fulganco Cardozo, Indian professional footballer.
- Seiminlen Doungel, Indian professional footballer.
- Rowilson Rodrigues, Indian professional footballer.
- Tanisha Crasto, Indian female badminton player
- Aneesha Cleetus, Indian female basketball player
- Robin Uthappa, Indian Cricketer
- Sanju Samson, Indian Cricketer.
- Ryan Williams (soccer, born 1993), Anglo Indian footballer who used to play for Australia men's national soccer team.
- K. M. Beenamol, an international athlete from India
- Tintu Luka, Indian athlete
- Geethu Anna Jose, Indian Basketball Player
- Brison Fernandes, Indian professional football athlete
- Varun Aaron, Indian professional cricketer.
- Mayookha Johnny, Indian track and field athlete.
- Raynier Fernandes, Indian professional footballer
- T. C. Yohannan, Indian long jumper
- K. M. Binu, Indian Athlete
- Macarton Nickson, Indian professional footballer
- Mathias Boe, Former Badminton professional athlete who is currently the doubles coach of Indian national Badminton team and also husband of Indian Bollywood actress Taapsee Pannu.
- Nayana James, Indian track and field athlete.
- Minimol Abraham, Indian former female Volleyball team player.
- Anna Mathew (volleyball), Indian female Volleyball athlete
- Rowllin Borges, Indian professional footballer
- Joseph Abraham, Indian hurdler.
- Vijay Amritraj, Indian former professional tennis player.
- Mamatha Maben, Former Indian female Cricketer
- Susan Florentina, Indian female Basketball athlete

== Arts ==
- Laurie Baker, Indian architect and Padma Shri awardee for Architecture, 1992.

== Christian Ministries ==
- George Koovakad - Indian cardinal of the Syro-Malabar Catholic Church
- Baselios Joseph- Catholicos of India of the Syriac Orthodox Church
- Baselios Thomas I- 1st Catholicos of India of the Syriac Orthodox Church
- Raphael Thattil - Indian major archbishop of the Syro-Malabar Catholic Church
- Philipose Chrysostom - Padma Bushan, bishop
- Baselios Mar Thoma Paulose II - 8th Catholicos of the Malankara Orthodox Syrian Church (2010–2021).
- Baselios Mar thoma Mathews III - 9th Catholicos of the Malankara Orthodox Syrian Church
- Puroshottam Choudhary - preacher, evangelist, writer of Christian literature
- Joseph Mar Thoma - Metropolitan of the Mar Thoma Syrian Church.
- Aurobindo Nath Mukherjee - first Indian Bishop of Calcutta and Metropolitan of India
- Lal Behari Dey - Indian journalist, writer, and Christian missionary
- Ravi Zacharias - Christian apologist,
- D. G. S. Dhinakaran - Christian evangelist.
- Valerian Gracias - First cardinal from India.
- Duraisamy Simon Lourdusamy - First Indian to head a Sacred Congregation of the Catholic Church.
- Acharya K. K. Chandy - President Emeritus- Fellowship of Reconciliation India; 1 of the 3 Founding Fathers - Christavashram, Kottayam; Founder Father- Gurukul Ecumenical Centre for Peace.
- Varghese Payyappilly Palakkappilly - Founder of the Congregation of the Sisters of the Destitute.
- Mary Celine Payyappilly - Servant of God, Professed Religious of the Congregation of the Mother of Carmel.
- Varkey Vithayathil - Catholic Cardinal and former Major Archbishop of the Syro-Malabar Church.
- Antony Padiyara - Catholic Cardinal and the First Major Archbishop of the Syro-Malabar Catholic Church.
- Joseph Parecattil - First from the Syro-Malabar church to be made a cardinal.
- Augustine Kandathil - First head of the Syro-Malabar Church and first Indian to assume powers and rule as an archbishop of the Catholic Church.
- Kuriakose Elias Chavara - First Indian to be beatified Syro-Malabar Catholic Church.
- Saint Alphonsa - first Indian Catholic to be raised to sainthood Syro-Malabar Catholic Church.
- V. C. Samuel - World-renowned Theologian, Historian, Ecumenical Leader, Professor/Dean in India and abroad, Priest, Indian Orthodox Church.
- Cyril Baselios - Former head of the Syro-Malankara Catholic Church.
- Mariam Thresia - Syro-Malabar Church.
- St. Euphrasia - Syro-Malabar Church.
- St. Joseph Vaz - Goan Oratorian priest and missionary to Sri Lanka
- Rani Maria Vattalil - Catholic religious and missionary social worker in the Franciscan Clarist Congregation
- Nidhiry Mani Kathanar - Priest of the Syro-Malabar Church
- Neiliezhü Üsou (1941–2009), Baptist preacher, theologian, Church musician, music teacher and composer from the North-Eastern state of India, Nagaland.
- Baselios Yeldo - was the Maphrian of the East of the Syriac Orthodox Church. He was the Catholicos of Jerusalem and Mosul. He is the Saint of Malankara Orthodox, Syriac Orthodox and Jacobite Orthodox Churches.
- Baselios Mar Thoma Mathews I - First Catholicos who used Mar Thoma in his title.
- Antonio Francisco Xavier Alvares - First Head of Goan Orthodox who was a Catholic Priest who joined Malankara Orthodox Syrian Church
- Devasahayam Pillai (1712–1752), He was canonized as a saint of the church by Pope Francis on 15 May 2022, layman and martyr of the Roman Catholic Church.
- Kattumangattu Abraham Mar Koorilos -(late)The first primate and Metropolitan of the Malabar Independent Syrian Church
- Geevarghese Gregorios - (1848–1902) First Indian to be raised to sainthood.
- Kurien Thomas - founder of the Fellowship of the Pentecostal Churches in India and Central India Theological Seminary.
- Geevarghese Dionysius of Vattasseril (Dionysius VI) (1858–1934) Malankara Metropolitan and Saint of Malankara Orthodox Church.
- Thomas Fernando, former Catholic bishop of Roman Catholic Diocese of Tuticorin
- Francis Tiburtius Roche, former Catholic bishop of Roman Catholic Diocese of Tuticorin
- Peter Fernando, former Catholic bishop of Roman Catholic Diocese of Tuticorin
- John Banerjee, Anglican Assistant bishop of Lahore

=== Others in Christian ministry ===
- Maria Theresa Chiramel – Catholic nun.
- Ken Gnanakan – Evangelist, singer, environmentalist and founder of Acts Ministries.
- P. C. John – Kerala Brethren person.
- Nirmala Joshi – Former Superior General of the Missionaries of Charity.
- Bakht Singh – (6 June 1903 – 17 September 2000) was a Christian evangelist in India and other parts of South Asia.
- Sadhu Sundar Singh – Missionary, Christian universalist.
- Sadhu Kochoonju Upadesi – Malayali preacher and poet / composer.
- Benjamin Bailey (missionary) – Missionary, Founded the first College in India, Developed first English Malayalam Dictionary.
- Graham Staines – Australian missionary
- Elizabeth Paul – Sister at CSI Order of Sisters, first woman to be ordained to priesthood
- Joseph John (minister)

== Literature ==
- Dom Moraes - India writer and poet
- Henry Louis Vivian Derozio - Anglo-Indian poet and social worker
- Krishna Mohan Banerjee - Bengali writer and first president of Bengal Christian Association
- Michael Madhusudan Dutt - famous Bengali poet and dramatist
- Toru Dutt - Bengali translator and poet in English and French
- Narayan Waman Tilak, Marathi poet
- Sarah Joseph. Is an Indian novelist and short story writer in Malayalam.
- Thomas Joseph, Was an Indian writer of Malayalam literature.
- Badal Sircar, Bengali playwright
- Mario Miranda, cartoonist
- Jaime Valfredo Rangel, Goan pioneer publisher and writer

== Cultural leaders ==
- George Menachery - Historian, author, encyclopaedist, archaeologist, anthropologist, writer of Church History
- Harris Jayaraj - A prominent music director mainly works in Tamil cinema
- Mother Teresa - Nobel Peace Prize winner Albanian Indian Catholic nun and founder of Missionaries of Charity religious institute and organization.
- D. Imman - Music director of Tamil cinema
- Fr. Paul Poovathingal, Carnatic music singer
- K. J. Yesudas - Indian Singer
- Ruskin Bond - Anglo Indian Padma Shri and Padma Bhushan award-winning Author
- Stephen Devassy - Indian Musician
- Tom Alter - White Indian Actor and son of American Christian missionaries

== See also ==
- Christianity in India
- Christianity in West Bengal
- Church of South India
- Telugu Christians
- Christianity in Tamil Nadu
- Goan Catholics
- Anglo-Indian people
- List of Saint Thomas Christians
- List of Syro-Malabar Catholics
- Mangalorean Catholics
- Marathi Christians
- Malankara Orthodox Syrian Church
- Christianity in Nagaland
- Christianity in Assam
- Christianity in Mizoram
- Mar Thoma Syrian Church
- Christianity in Gujarat
- Christianity in Uttar Pradesh
- Christianity in Madhya Pradesh
- Church of North India
- Christian Revival Church
