= Manal (disambiguation) =

Manal was an Argentine rock group.

Manal may also refer to:

- Manal (name), list of people with the name
- Manal Kayiru, 1982 Indian comedy drama film
- Manal Kayiru 2, 2016 Indian comedy drama film
- Manal Naharam, 2015 Indian film
- Manal Matha Shrine, church in Tamil Nadu
- Dewal Manal, union council in Pakistan
