= Yvon Ambroise =

Bishop of Tuticorin

The Reverend Yvon Ambroise
- Bishop Emeritus of Tuticorin
- See: Tuticorin
- Appointed: 1 April 2005
- Installed: 18 May 2005
- Term ended: 24 February 2019
- Predecessor: Peter Fernando
- Successor: Stephen Antony Pillai

Orders
- Ordination: 23 December 1967 by Ambrose Rayappan
- Consecration: 18 May 2005 by Pedro López Quintana

Personal details
- Born: Yvon Ambroise; 30 August 1942 (age 84) Pondicherry
- Denomination: Catholic
- Parents: Ponnu Tambi Ambroise, Antoinette Ambroise
- Motto: Life in its fullness (John 10:10)
- Coat of arms: Yvon Ambroise's coat of arms

Ordination history of Yvon Ambroise
History
Priestly ordination
- Ordained by: Ambrose Rayappan
Episcopal consecration
- Principal consecrator: Pedro López Quintana
- Co-consecrators: Antony Anandarayar Peter Fernando

Styles of Yvon Ambroise
- Reference style: His Excellency
- Spoken style: Your Excellency
- Religious style: The Most Reverend

Yvon Ambroise (born 30 August 1942) is the Bishop Emeritus of Tuticorin. He was appointed on 1 April 2005 and was consecrated by Pedro López Quintana on 18 May 2005. Bishops Antony Anandarayar and Peter Fernando acted as co-consecrators. He succeeded Bishop Peter Fernando to become the sixth bishop of Tuticorin. His term ended on 24 February 2019 and he was succeeded by Bishop Stephen Antony Pillai.

He was born to Ponnu Tambi Ambroise and Antoinette Ambroise in Pondicherry, India. He was ordained a priest at Immaculate Conception Cathedral, Pondicherry by Archbishop Ambrose Rayappan.

== Posts Held ==
He has held the following positions:

- 15-05-1968 – Jun. 1969 Assistant Parish Priest at Cuddalore N.T.
- Jun. 1969 - Feb. 1970 St.Peter’s Pastoral Institute Poonamallee – Student
- Feb. 1970 - May 1971 Asst. Parish Priest at Neyveli
- May 1971- Aug. 1972 Diocesan Director of YCS & YCW
- Aug. 1972 -Jun. 1974 Parish Priest of Thurinjipoondy
- Jun. 1974 -Sep. 1976 Lent to Hyderabad, Andhra
- Regional YCS & YCW Chaplain
- Sep. 1976 – Higher Studies in Belgium
- Jan. 1983 – Asst. Director, Caritas Asia, India
- May 1988 – Executive Director of Caritas, India
- Jun. 1995 – Sabbatical Year
- 25.05.1996 – 20.09.1999 Parish Priest of Quasi Parish T.R.Pattinam
- 10.09.1999 – Secretary, Coordinator – Caritas Asia.
- 01.04.2005 Nominated Bishop of Tuticorin.

Catholic Church titles
Preceded by Peter Fernando	Bishop of Tuticorin; 18 May 2005 - 24 February 2019	Succeeded by Stephen Antony Pillai
