= Stephen Antony Pillai =

Roman Catholic bishop

His Excellency Stephen Antony Pillai
- Bishop of Tuticorin
- Archdiocese: Madurai
- Diocese: Tuticorin
- Appointed: 17 January 2019
- Successor: Incumbent

Orders
- Ordination: 7 May 1979
- Consecration: 24 February 2019 by Yvon Ambroise

Personal details
- Born: 22 June 1952 (age 74) Kanyakumari Tamil Nadu India
- Denomination: Roman Catholic
- Education: Pontifical Urban University

Stephen Antony Pillai (born 22 June 1952) mononymously known as Stephen is the Indian bishop of the Roman Catholic Diocese of Tuticorin.

== Early life and priestly formation ==
Born in Keezha Manakudy of the Diocese of Kottar in the civil district of Kanyakumari district, Tamil Nadu, India, Pillai sought to become a priest, entering the St Thomas Minor Seminary, Santhome, Chennai in 1969. He gained his bachelor's degree in philosophy in Arul Anandar College, Karumathur, Madurai, being an alumnus of Christ Hall seminary, Karumathur, Madurai. He continued his theological formation in St Paul's Seminary, Trichy and obtained a bachelor's degree in theology. After his formation, he was ordained a priest for the diocese of Vellore on 7 May 1979.

== Pastoral ministry ==
As a priest of the Diocese of Vellore, he has served the diocese in various capacities. He was appointed as assistant parish priest in our Lady of Lourdes Shrine in Chetpet (1979-1980) and in Sacred Heart Church in Polur (1980-1981). As the parish priest, he has served in the following parishes: Our Lady of Fatima church (1983-1986) and Cathedral of Vellore (2001-2005). He has been appointed as the director of the diocesan pastoral center (1996-1999), as vicar general (2002-2005), vicar forane and member of the episcopal council (2010-2016), and the director of the diocesan retreat centre (2017-2019). To add a feather to his extensive pastoral ministry, he has been a missionary to Guadeloupe, France (1990-1996).

== Higher studies and teaching ministry ==
After two years of ministry in the diocese, he was sent to St Peter's Pontifical Institute, Bangalore for master's degree in theology (1981-1983). He also pursued a doctoral degree in biblical theology from Pontifical Urban University, Rome (1986-1989). He was a professor in St Paul's seminary (1999-2001) and served as vice rector of the seminary (2006-2010). He has been a visiting professor to Don Bosco major seminary, Chennai, Pallotine major seminary, Mysore, Karnataka, and to St Paul's seminary, Trichy (since 2017).

== Announcement and consecration ==
Pope Francis accepted the resignation of Bishop Yvon Ambroise and appointed Stephen Antony Pillai as the new bishop of the diocese of Tuticorin on 17 January 2019. His episcopal ordination took place on 24 February 2019. He is the seventh bishop of the Roman Catholic Diocese of Tuticorin.

Catholic Church titles
Preceded by Yvon Ambroise	Bishop of Tuticorin; 24 February 2019	Incumbent
