= X. D. Selvaraj =

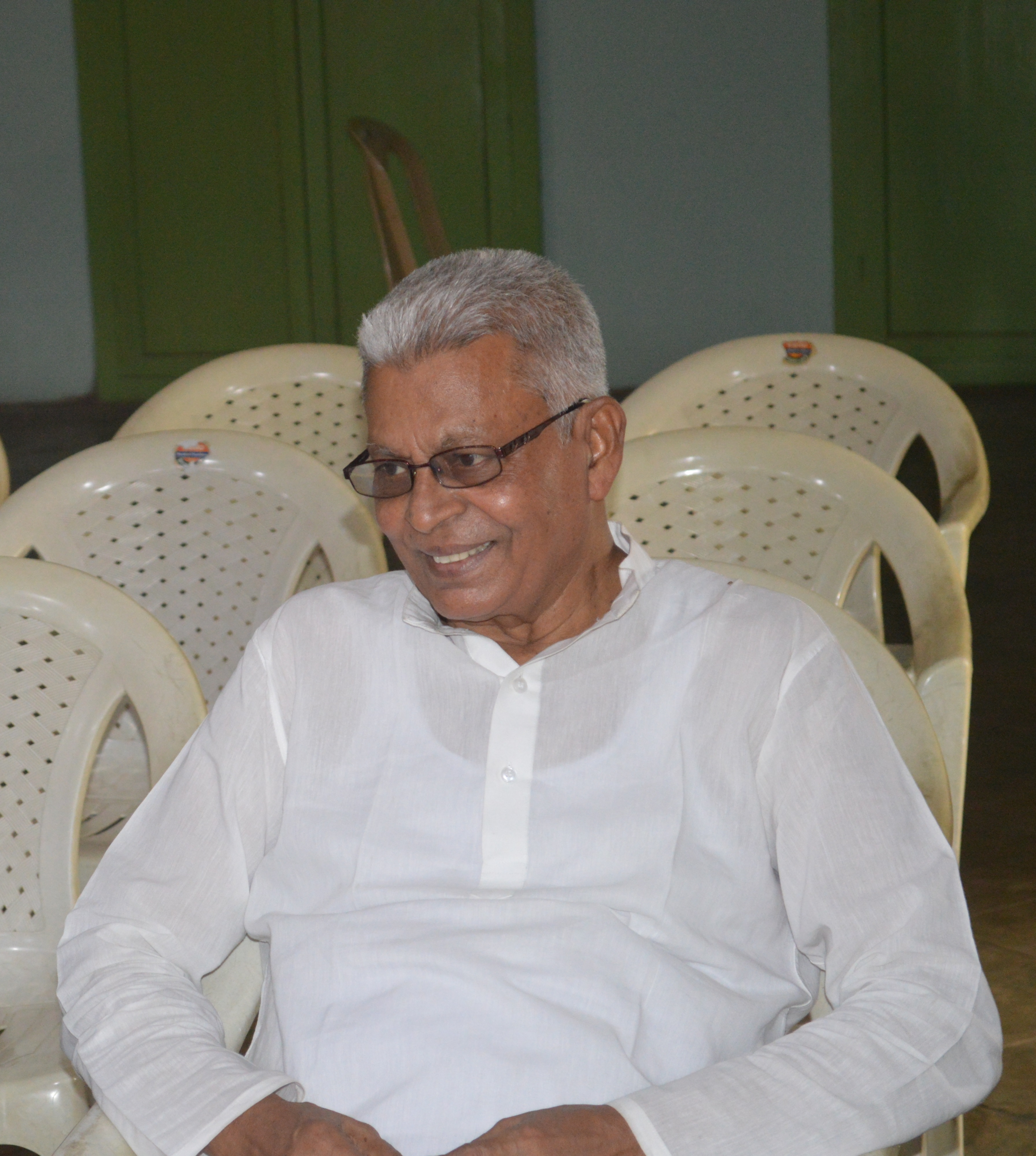
Fr X D Selvaraj

== Early life ==
The Rev. Fr. X. D. Selvaraj (born 13 May 1944, Idinthakarai, Nellai) is a Roman Catholic priest from Tamil Nadu, India.

== Ministry ==
Fr. X. D. Selvaraj was ordained a priest on 19 October 1971 for the Roman Catholic Diocese of Tuticorin.

He has served the diocese in various capacities as priest. He was appointed professor in St Paul's Seminary, Trichy. He served as the secretary of the laity commission of Conference of the Catholic Bishops of India (2004–2008). He is a member of Catholic Priests’ Conference of India. He has been a social activist. He raised his concern in a convention conducted by Catholic Priests’ Conference of India on 23 September 2005 about the identity and culture of tribal people which is threatened by industrialization and globalization. He addressed the response of the youth in the context of Indian reality on 7 January 2011. He presented an analysis of the socio, economic, political and cultural reality on 3 March in a training course on ROL in Nagercoil. He invited the catholic priests to work for justice and human right issues in the Catholic Priest's Conference of India on 26 September 2018.

== Publications ==
He is the author of the book Viduthalaiyin Paathaikal, published in 2016.
