= Thomas Fernando =

Indian Roman Catholic bishop

- Church: Catholic Church
- Diocese: diocese of Tiruchirappalli
- In office: 24 January 1971 – 30 December 1990
- Predecessor: James Mendonca
- Successor: Gabriel Lawrence Sengol
- Previous posts: Bishop of Tuticorin (1953-1971) />Coadjutor Bishop of Tuticorin (1950-1953)

Orders
- Ordination: 18 March 1939
- Consecration: 01 October 1950 by Francis Tibrutius Roche

Personal details
- Born: 9 May 1913 Idinthakarai (southeast of Vairavikinaru), Province of Madras, British Raj, British Empire
- Died: 4 July 2006 (aged 93)

Most.Rev.Thomas Fernando Bishop Emeritus Of Tuticorin & Tiruchirappalli

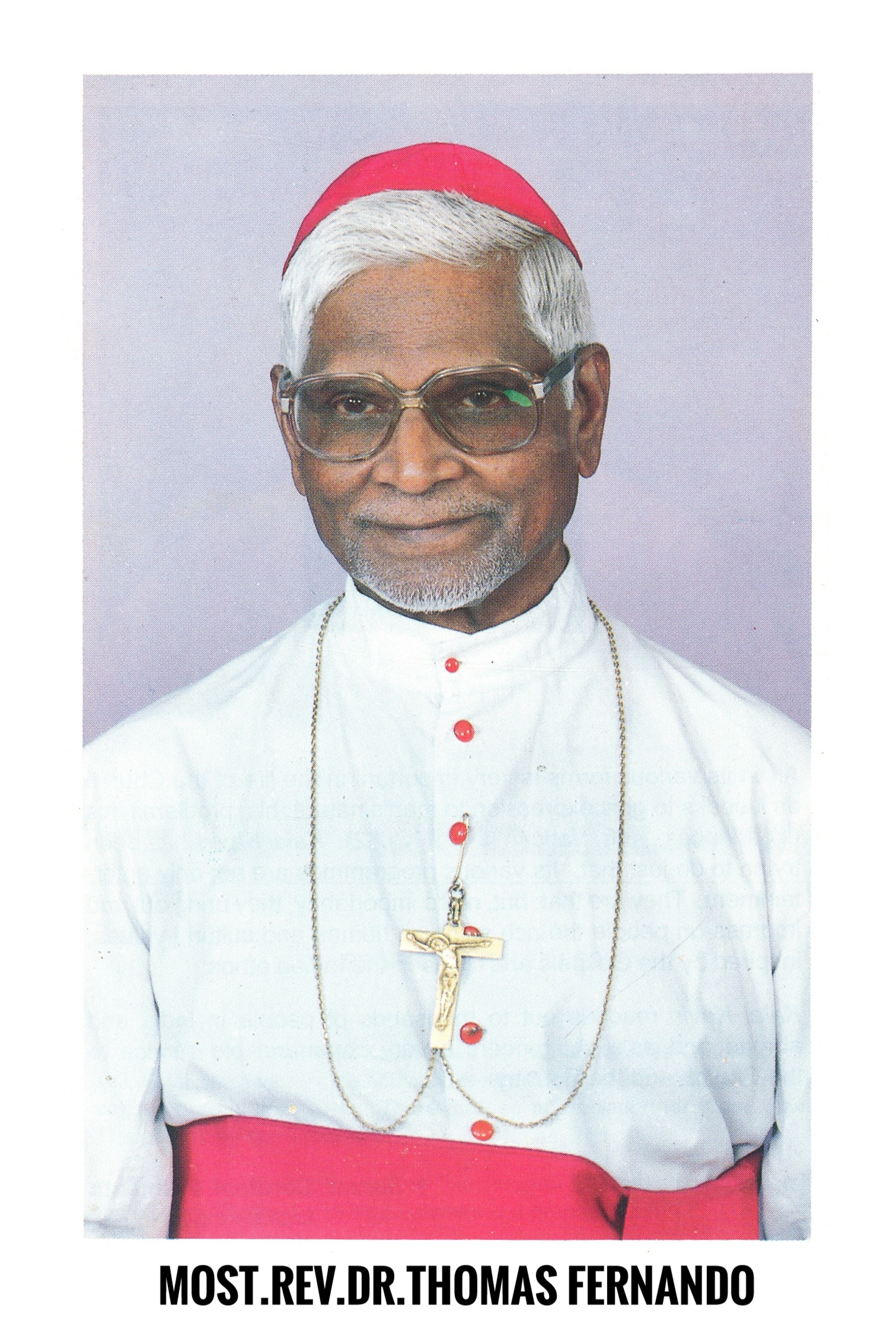
Most Rev Bishop Thomas Fernando

Thomas Fernando was an Indian Roman Catholic bishop.

== Early life ==
Bishop Thomas was born on 09 May 1913 at Idinthakarai, a coastal village ten kilometers away in the east from Kaniyakumari the southern tip of India. He was the second of the seven children to his parents. The eldest was a daughter and today she is a retired religious nun aged 96 at the Servite Convent (Bethany) at Tuticorin. Two of his younger brothers – Rev. Fr. Rosario Fernando and Rev. Fr. Charles Fernando are the Priests of Tuticorin Diocese now living a retired life in Tuticorin.

== Career ==
He was ordained a priest for the diocese of Tuticorin on 18 March 1939. After his higher studies in theology, Indian philosophy and canon law in Rome, he was appointed coadjutor bishop of Tuticorin on 25 June 1950 and ordained bishop on 1 October 1950. He succeeded Bishop Francis Tiburtius Roche on 26 June 1953, as the second bishop of the diocese of Tuticorin. After twenty years of episcopal ministry in the diocese of Tuticorin, on 23 November 1970, he was transferred as bishop to the diocese of Tiruchirapalli.

== Achievements ==
He participated in all four sessions of the Second Vatican Council. Inspired by the spirit of the council, he became the forerunner in implementing its teachings in Tamil Nadu, by reforming liturgical and para-liturgical celebrations. He translated Latin liturgical texts into Tamil language. He promoted catechism, evangelization, liturgy, social communication, Tamil literature, culture and inter-religious dialogue. As bishop he founded Kalai Kaveri college for music to promote Catholic faith through fine arts. He established the congregation of the Sacred Heart Sisters, initially to take care of St Joseph Charity Home in Adaikalapuram, a diocesan rite congregation on 19 December 1954 to undertake mission work in the Tuticorin diocese. As bishop Tirichirapalli, he felt the need of the female missionary collaboraters, He founded a congregation of St Thomas Catechetical Sisters in Tirichirapalli. He is hailed for helping Tamil poet Kannadasan write Yesu Kaviyam. After 56 years as a bishop, he died on 4 July 2006.
