= St. Joseph Shrine, Panagudi =

Shrine in Tamil Nadu, India

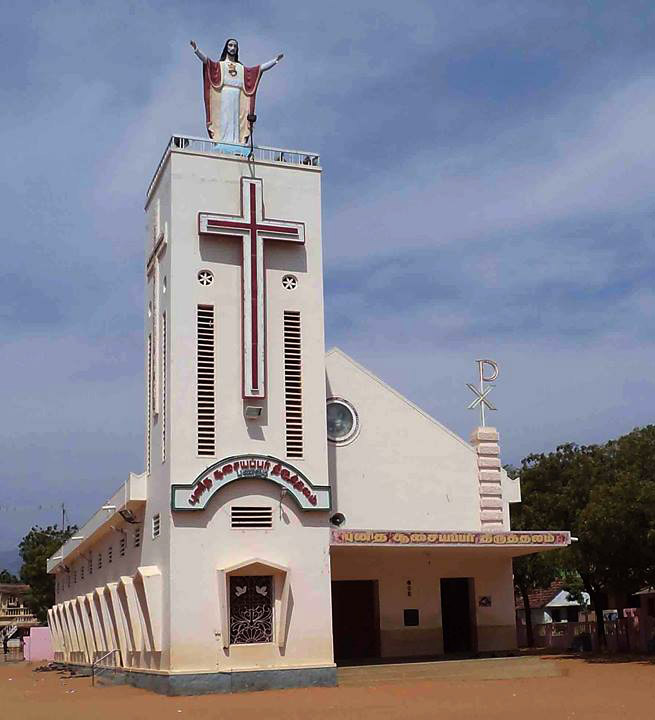
- Front view of the Shrine

Religion
- Affiliation: Roman Catholic
- Ecclesiastical or organisational status: Shrine
- Year consecrated: 1976

Location
- Location: Panagudi, Tamil Nadu
- Interactive map of St. Joseph Shrine, Panagudi
- Coordinates: 8.316895°N 77.577703°E

Architecture
- Style: Modern

Website
- StJosephShrine

St. Joseph Shrine, Panagudi is a shrine dedicated to Saint Joseph under the Diocese of Tuticorin in Tamil Nadu.

== History ==
A church of Saint Joseph was built in the 1870s and renovated in 1891 and 1892, when the church was in the Kaavalkinaru parish. Panagudi was established as an independent parish on 24 December 1939. During the period from 1972 to 1981 the current church was built and consecrated.
