= Matthew K. Thomas =

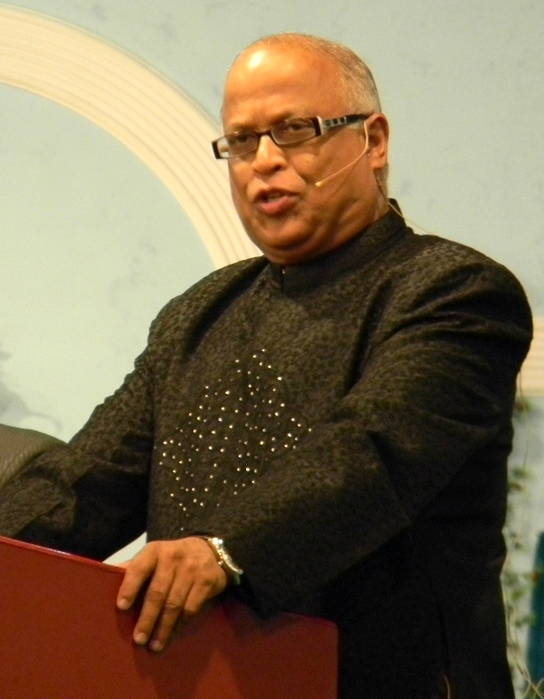

Chairman of Fellowship of the Pentecostal Churches in India

Personal details
- Born: Matthew K. Thomas; 2 November 1948 (age 77) Itarsi, Madhya Pradesh, India
- Spouse: Aleyamma Thomas
- Children: Mercy, Michael, Melissa
- Education: Sagar University
- Profession: Academic, Pastor
- Website: www.matthewkthomas.org

Matthew K. Thomas (born 2 November 1948) is the son of Kurien Thomas and the present Chairman of the Fellowship of the Pentecostal Churches in India. He is the present President of Central India Theological Seminary and also the President of Central India Outreach. He was also Secretary of the Pentecostal World Fellowship and later served on its Advisory Committee.

== Early life ==
Matthew K. Thomas was born to Kurien Thomas and Annamma Thomas on 2 November 1948. In his autobiography, Kurien Thomas mentions the events surrounding Matthew's birth:

On the 2nd of November, 1948, our second son was born. He was delivered in the house attended by a village midwife. One of the believers, a sister, was also present. She told me that according to the custom of the place, as soon as the child was born, the midwife should be given a gift of some kind. I did not have even one penny to my name; what could I give her? I went outside and began pacing up and down in the courtyard. I prayed earnestly: "Lord, please let me not be ashamed before this Hindu woman. Give me something I can give to her." I was still praying when the postman came with a money order for ten rupees. As I received the money the baby was born. At once I put a few rupees into the midwife's hand. I can't help thinking that God had a quartz timepiece long before man had one, because He is always on time.

Matthew grew up in Itarsi and went on to Sagar University where he finished his M.Sc. in Zoology. He then began to teach in a College in Hoshangabad for sometime, before leaving India for the United States. On 2 March 1974, Matthew was married to Aleyamma who was also working as nurse in America. Matthew became successful as a businessman in US, but sooner realized that he was called to ministry in India.

== Return to India and Ministry ==
In 1992, he returned to India to join with his father in the ministry. He was appointed as the Principal of Central India Bible College, which under his leadership, grew into Central India Theological Seminary. The biographical note on Matthew's website states:

Dr. Thomas, a flourishing businessman in the States, responded to God’s calling and left his secular orientations to enter into full-time ministry in Central India. Under his leadership, Dr. Thomas established Central India Outreach (CIO) which embodies House of Hope (Orphanages), Central India Theological Seminary (CITS), Central India Vocational Instructional Centre (CIVIC), Central India Mercy Clinic (CIMC), Central India Restoration Centre Lives Empowered (CIRCLE), and Indovision 20/20.

== See also ==
- Kurien Thomas
- Central India Theological Seminary
- Pentecostal World Fellowship
- Fellowship of the Pentecostal Churches in India
