= Panagudi =

- Special grade town panchayat
- Location in Tamil Nadu, India
- Coordinates: 8°20′57″N 77°34′02″E
- Country: India
- State: Tamil Nadu
- District: Tirunelveli

Population (2011)
  - Total: 29,895
- Time zone: UTC+5:30 (IST)
- PINComisionar: 627109
- Telephone code: 04637
- Vehicle registration: TN 72

Panagudi is a special grade townpanchayat in the Tirunelveli district in the Indian state of Tamil Nadu.it is biggest towns in thirunelveli district and fastest growing town in thirunelveli district

Panagudi is known for its wind farms, the Pathini energy drink (from palm trees), brick production, clay tiles, climatic conditions and scenic views.

== History ==
Legend has it that Panagudi got its name from its abundance of palm trees, known in Tamil as panai maram. The name Panagudi directly derives from Panaikudi, the names of its post office and railway station.

== Demographics ==
As of 2011 India census, Panagudi had a population of 29,895. Males constituted 49% of the population and females constituted 51%. Panagudi has a literacy rate of 77%, which is higher than the national average of 74.04%; literacy is 80% for males, and 73% for females. In Panagudi, 11% of the population is under six years of age.

Adherents of three religions, Islam, Christianity, and Hinduism, live in different areas of the town. Panagudi is a hub for different castes and religions, but the Nadars predominate. They were well known as palm climbers in earlier days, but currently, they depend more on business activities. Nadars are categorized as Hindu Nadars and Christian Nadars.

== Climate, geography, nature, wildlife ==
Surrounded by mountainous terrain, Panagudi is located in a windy area, which has led to the development of several wind farms around the area.

Panagudi experiences two monsoons, the southwestern monsoon and the northeastern monsoon. Panagudi has the Western Ghats (Mahendragiri) running on the west side and is surrounded by a chain of mountains. The mountains form natural waterfalls named Kuthara Paanjan and Kani Maram Thoppu, both of which receive water when the season is favourable. A waterfall is located in the area known as Kuthira Panchan, in Mahendragiri of the Western Ghats, 9 kilometres (5.6 mi) away from the Panagudi Police Station. The waterfall is located outside of the town limits, though there is an approach road. There are no signboards, so people who wish to visit the place must find the falls with the help of locals in the area. The fall is seasonal in nature, and hence the best time to visit is after the monsoon, when the flow is good. The other popular areas in the mountains are Kanchi Paarai, Kunni Muthu Solai, Sengamaal, and Iyar Thottam. There are farms and plantations of various crops, fruits, cashew nuts, and mangos around Panagudi. Nature is well protected and maintained in this area. Paddy and bananas are cultivated and Vazhai Thoppu is famous for banana cultivation. The Panagudi forest is a habitat of various animals such as tigers, elephants, different species of deer including sambar deer, fox, Indian wolves, red dogs, bears, rabbits, porcupines, and various species of snakes and birds.

== Landmarks ==
The ramaling swami udanurai sivakami ambal and nambi singa perumal temples presence on over 2000 years old and famous temples like udaiyadi sudalai madan swamy temple and veerakaali amman temple. The Roman Catholic churches St. Joseph Church is located here. Panagudi also has a number of other Christian churches.

== Economy ==
Panagudi had many important industries. The town was a business hub for various corporations such as KKNPP and ISRO, as well as tile factories, wind farms, and other projects.

=== Major industries ===
Employment opportunities for the people of Panagudi are quite scattered. Major employers are:

- ZOZWEB SOFTWARES PRIVATE LIMITED is an AI software Development company located in main road Panagudi*
- Techdragon, online content marketing company situated in Panagudi
- 7Host, web hosting company located in Panagudi
- Kudankulam Nuclear Power Plant, Kudankulam, at 15 minutes travel time
- ISRO, Mahendragiri, at 10 minutes travel time
- SEZ, Nanguneri, at 30 minutes travel time
- Cholamandalam Investments And Finance Company Ltd, Other Financial Companies and Banks at 15minutes travel time

== Education ==
- Manonmaniam Sundaranar University Colleges
- VET College of Education
- St. Ann's Matriculation School
- Sacred Heart Brothers Institutions such as Tamil medium school, matriculation school, and CBSC school
- Murugan Typewriting Institute, 90 West Car Street, cell 9865380329
- Murugan Computer Center
- Murugan Hindi Tuition Center
- RMS International School
- Pulliman Matriculation School
- TDTA Middle School, Thalavaipuram
- TDTA School, Panagudi
- Government Higher Secondary School
- Hussay Middle School

== Adjacent areas ==
=== Sivakamipuram ===
It is a village located on the NH7 Road w.i.s. next to Panagudi. St. Ann's Matriculation Higher Secondary School is located in this specialgrade town panchayat

=== Thalavaipuram ===
Thalavaipuram falls under the Panagudi special grade town panchayat and used to be a village. Now it is growing fast culturally and economically. In 2001, an English medium school named Bharath Nursery School was started in Thalavaipuram in a rented building near the Thalavaipuram bus stop, which shifted to its own premises on the way to Panagudi.

Pushpavanam

It is a special grade town panchayat located near to Panagudi. St Theresa's R.C Middle School located in this city
