= Diocese of Tuticorin =

Roman Catholic diocese in Tamil Nadu, India

Coordinates: 8.8048°N 78.1564°E

Diocese of Tuticorin Dioecesis Tuticorensis தூத்துக்குடி மறைமாவட்டம்
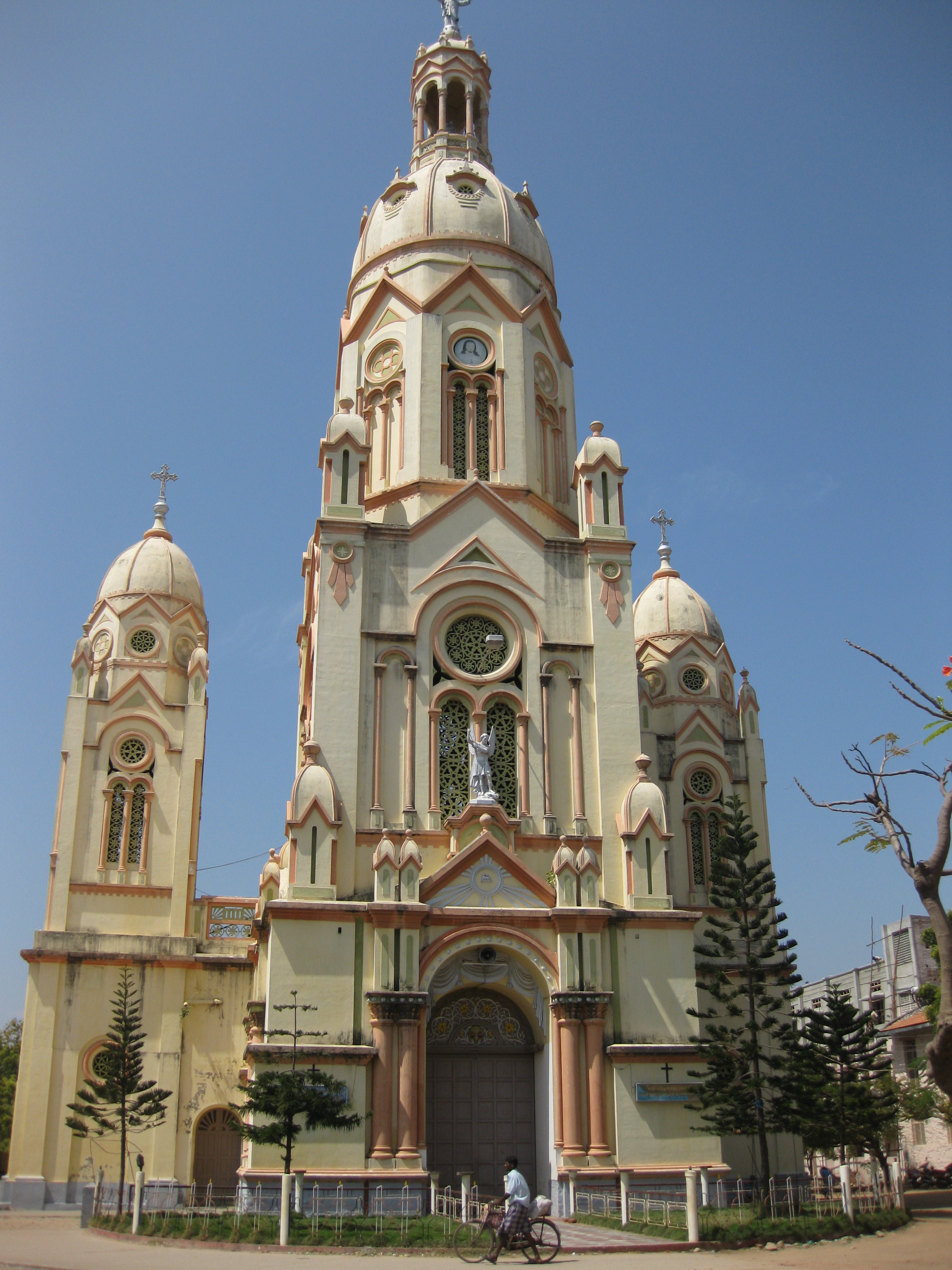
- Sacred Heart Cathedral, Tuticorin, The Mother Church of the Diocese

Location
- Country: India
- Ecclesiastical province: Madurai
- Metropolitan: Madurai
- Deaneries: 5

Statistics
- Area: 6,440 km^{2} (2,490 sq mi)
- Population: Total; Catholics: (as of 2011); 2,590,000; 621,820 (26.3%)
- Parishes: 120

Information
- Denomination: Roman Catholic
- Rite: Latin Rite
- Established: 12 June 1923
- Cathedral: Sacred Heart Cathedral in Thoothukudi
- Patron saint: Saint Francis Xavier; Saint Thérèse of Lisieux

Current leadership
- Pope: Leo XIV
- Bishop: Most Rev Dr Stephen Antony Pillai
- Metropolitan Archbishop: Most Rev Dr.Antony Pappusamy
- Vicar General: Fr Panneer Selvam N.A.
- Bishops emeritus: Rev. Dr. Yvon Ambroise

Website
- Website of the Diocese

The Roman Catholic Diocese of Tuticorin (Latin: Tuticoren(sis)) is a unit (or 'particular Church') of the Catholic Church in the city of Tuticorin, part of the ecclesiastical province of Madurai in India.

== History ==
The diocese of Tuticorin comprises the major part of the Tuticorin district, nearly half of the Nellai district, and a small portion of the Kanyakumari district. The Catholics of this area trace their origin to the time of St. Francis Xavier who spent most of his missionary life in this area. Separated from the diocese of Tiruchirapalli, Tuticorin was created as a diocese and entrusted to the diocesan clergy in 1923 by the Apostolic Brief "Quae Catholico Nomini" of Pope Pius XI. It was entrusted to the indigenous clergy with Rt. Rev. Francis Tiburtius Roche s.j., as its first bishop. He was also the first Indian bishop of the Latin Rite. The patrons of the diocese are St. Francis Xavier and St. Teresa of the Child Jesus.

== Vicariates ==
Five Vicariates are present in the Tuticorin diocese. Vicariates and Forane Churches are:

- Tuticorin - Sacred Heart Cathedral, Tuticorin, Tuticorin
- Sathankulam - Immaculate Heart of Mary Church, Sathankulam, Sathankulam
- Vadakkankulam - Holy Family Church, Vadakkankulam, Vadakkankulam
- Manapad - St. Thoma's Church, Veerapandianpattinam, Tiruchendur
- Kurukkusalai - Infant Jesus Church, Vemboor

== Famous churches ==
- Minor Basilica
  - Shrine Basilica of Our Lady of the Snows, Tuticorin
- Cathedral
  - Sacred Heart Cathedral, Tuticorin
- Special Churches
  - Holy Cross Shrine, Manapad
  - St. Antony's shrine, Uvari
  - Our Lady of Assumption Shrine, Vadakkankulam
  - Our Lady of Red Sand Shrine, Sokkankudiyirupu via Sathankulam
  - Immaculate Heart of Mary Church, Sathankulam, Sathankulam
  - Our Lady of Snows, Kallikulam
  - Our Lady of Holy Marriage Shrine , pothakalavilai via Sathankulam
  - Sacred Heart Jesus, Alanthalai via Tiruchendur
  - Holy Redeemer church, Thisayanvilai
  - Our Lady of Fatima Shrine, Valliyur
  - Our Lady of Rajakanni Church, Punnakayal
  - Our Lady of Nativity ( St. Lucia Shrine ) , Anaikarai via Thisayanvilai
  - St. James Shrine, Srivaikuntam
  - Our Lady of Sarrows Shrine, Malayankulam via Nanguneri
  - Our Lady of Velankanni shrine, Kavalkinaru
  - St. Joseph Church, Kootapuli
  - Sacred Heart Jesus Church, Kavalkinaru
  - St. Joseph Shrine, Panagudi
  - St. Thomas church, Vembar
  - Holy Spirit Church, Manapad
  - Amali Annai Church, Tiruchendur
  - St. Thomas Church, Tiruchendur
  - Selva Matha Church, Uvari
  - Manal Matha Shrine, Thoothukudi district
  - St. Anthony's Shrine, Thoothukudi
  - Our Lady of Lourdes Church, Idinthakarai
  - St. Antony's Church, Azhagappapuram
  - St Anne's Church, Koodankulam

== Notable people ==
- Senhor dos Senhores Don Gabriel da Cruz(Parathavarma Pandian) was a notable king of the Paravars who helped Maruthu Pandiyar and other freedom fighters. This king was also responsible for the construction of the Golden Car of the Basilica of Our Lady of Snows, Thoothukudi. He was also known as Pandiapathy.
- Bishop Francis Tiburtius Roche (First indigenous bishop of the Latin Rite in India, in China, in Asia, and in Africa).
- Bishop Peter Fernando (Former Bishop of Tuticorin Diocese and Archbishop of Madurai Diocese) was a Roman Catholic bishop, born in Idinthakarai on 22 March 1939. He was ordained a priest for the diocese of Tuticorin on 31 May 1971
- Bishop Thomas Fernando (Former Bishop of Tuticorin & Trichy Dioceses, Participated in the Second Vatican Council, Helped poet Kannadasan to write Yesu Kaviyam, Founder of Kalai Kaveri College). He was born on 9 May 1913 in Idinthakarai, Tirunelveli district. He founded a congregation of St Thomas Catechetical Sisters in Tirichirapalli. He is hailed for helping Tamil poet Kannadasan write Yesu Kaviyam
- Bishop Antony Devotta (Former Bishop of Trichy Diocese, First Indian Bishop and second bishop in the worldwide Catholic Church to donate his body).
- J.P. Chandrababu Rodriguez was an Indian actor, comedian, playback singer, and film director.
- Dewan Bahadur Chevalier I. X. Pereira (Ignatius Xavier Pereira) KCSS, colonial-era Sri Lankan businessman and politician. He became a Chevalier of the Order of St. Sylvester, which is one of the five orders of knighthood awarded directly by the Pope as Supreme Pontiff and head of the Catholic Church and as the Head of State of Vatican City.
- Rao Bahadur Cruz Fernandez (Legislator). he was an Indian businessman. He was the longest-serving chairman of Tuticorin Municipality and is considered the father and architect of Modern Tuticorin.
- Chevalier J. L. P. Roche Victoria (Former State Minister from Tamil Nadu). Victoria became a Chevalier of the Order of St. Gregory the Great
- Chevalier C.I.R. Machado KSG became a Chevalier of the Order of St. Gregory the Great.
- S. M. Diaz IPS was a former Inspector-General of Police of Tamil Nadu.
- Valampuri John (Tamil Writer, Orator, and Former member of Rajya Sabha).
- Ignaci Siluvai (Catholic Priest & Educator).
- S. Jennifer Chandran was an Indian politician and was a Member of the Legislative Assembly.
- Jeyaraj. Thomas Jeyaraj Fernando is a renowned painter in Tamil Nadu. He has illustrated the works of more than 400 writers, mainly cover art, artwork, comics, and as a costume designer for films. Along with friends, he has run a manuscript magazine called Sculptor.

== Leadership ==
- Bishops of Tuticorin (Latin Rite)
  - Bishop Stephen Antony (17 January 2019 – present)
  - Bishop Yvon Ambrose (1 April 2005 – 17 January 2019)
  - Bishop Peter Fernando (later Archbishop of Madurai) (8 December 1999 – 22 March 2003)
  - Bishop Siluvaimathu Teresanathan Amalnather (29 November 1980 – 8 December 1999)
  - Bishop Ambrose Mathalaimuthu (Transferred to Diocese of Coimbatore) (30 August 1971 – 6 December 1979)
  - Bishop Thomas Fernando (26 June 1953 – 23 November 1970) Transferred to the Diocese of Tiruchirapalli
  - Bishop Francis Tiburtius Roche S.J. (12 June 1923 – 26 June 1953)

== Saints and causes for canonisation ==
- Servant of God Fr. Antony Soosainather, CR
- Servant of God, Rev. Fr. Augustine Pereira
