= Kurien Thomas =

Indian missionary and Pentecostal theologian (1922–2000)

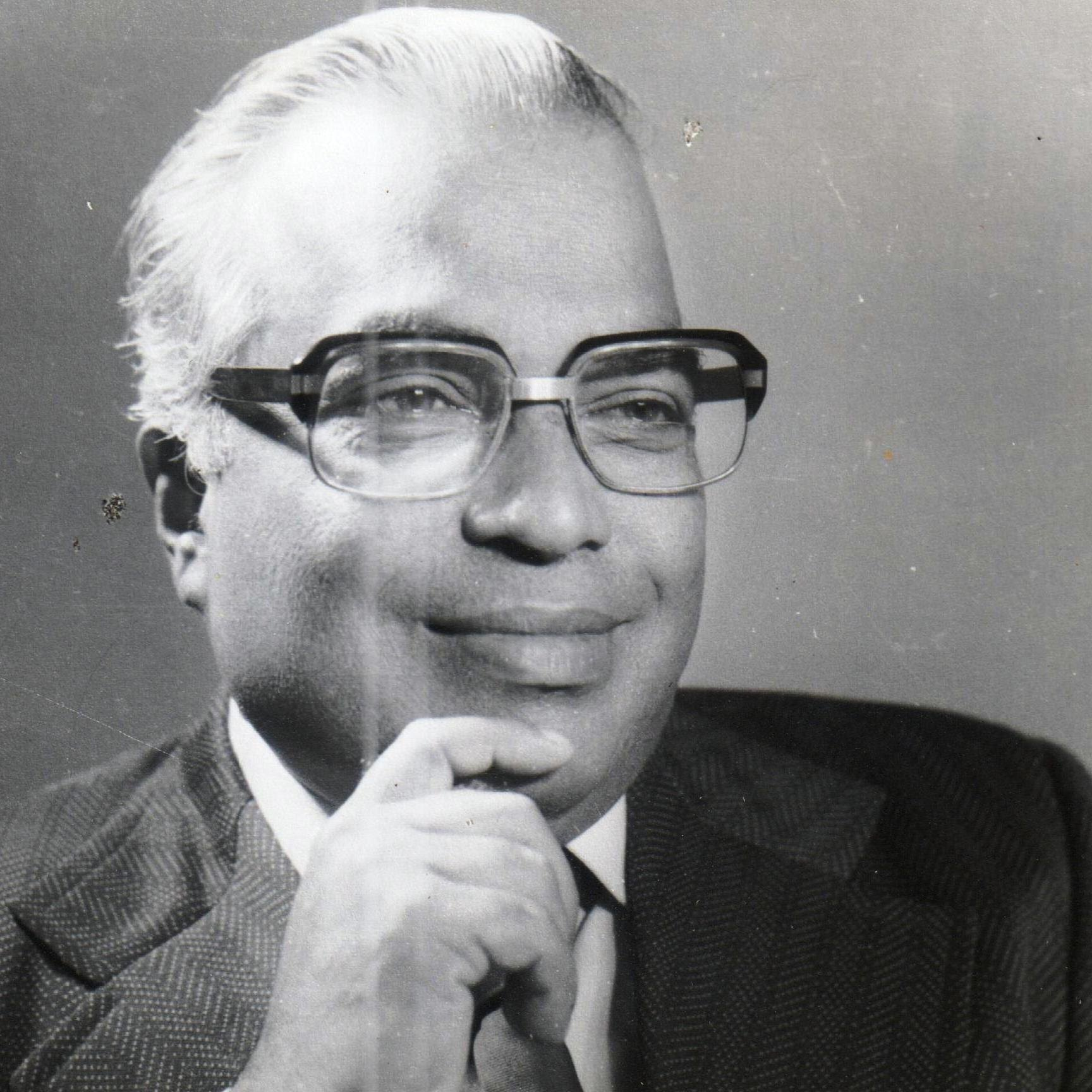
- Born: 9 January 1922; Ranny, Kerala
- Died: 19 October 2000 (aged 78); Itarsi, India
- Other names: Kurian Thomas
- Occupations: Pastor, missionary, theologian, Christian author
- Known for: President of Central India Theological Seminary, Chairman of the Fellowship of the Pentecostal Churches in India

Kurien Thomas (1922–2000) or Kurian Thomas was a Pentecostal missionary pastor, founding Chairman of the Fellowship of the Pentecostal Churches in India and founding President of the Central India Bible College in Central India.

== Early life ==
Kurien was born on 9 January 1922 at Ranny, Kerala. His parents belonged to the Syrian Orthodox Church and traced their origins to the first converts of Thomas the Apostle. In his early days he participated in the independence movement of India and opposed Pentecostal work in his area. However, in 1939 he was converted at a gospel meeting that featured Pastor K.E. Abraham and Pastor K.C. Cherian as guest speakers. For a while after that he traveled to different places for ministry, including to Lahore where he was stationed for a few months in 1943 and 1944.

== Work at Itarsi ==
In February 1945, he and his wife Annamma went to Itarsi as pioneering Pentecostal missionaries. They served with the India Pentecostal Church of God initially. However, with the establishment of the Bible college in Itarsi in 1962 and the rapid growth of Pentecostal congregations in the north, the ministers felt the need for a closer fellowship; consequently, formation of a fellowship began in the 1966 Itarsi convention and the Fellowship of the Pentecostal Churches in India was registered in 1969 with Thomas as its first elected Chairman.

He authored several books in Hindi, English, and Malayalam. He was the pastor of the Pentecostal Church at Itarsi, Chairman and later Patron of the Fellowship of the Pentecostal Churches in India, and Principal of the Central India Bible College. Many indigenous missionaries received theological training at this college.

He was recipient of several awards for his outstanding contributions in the field of Christian literature, education, and ministry. He wrote an autobiography titled God's Trailblazer In India and Around the World.

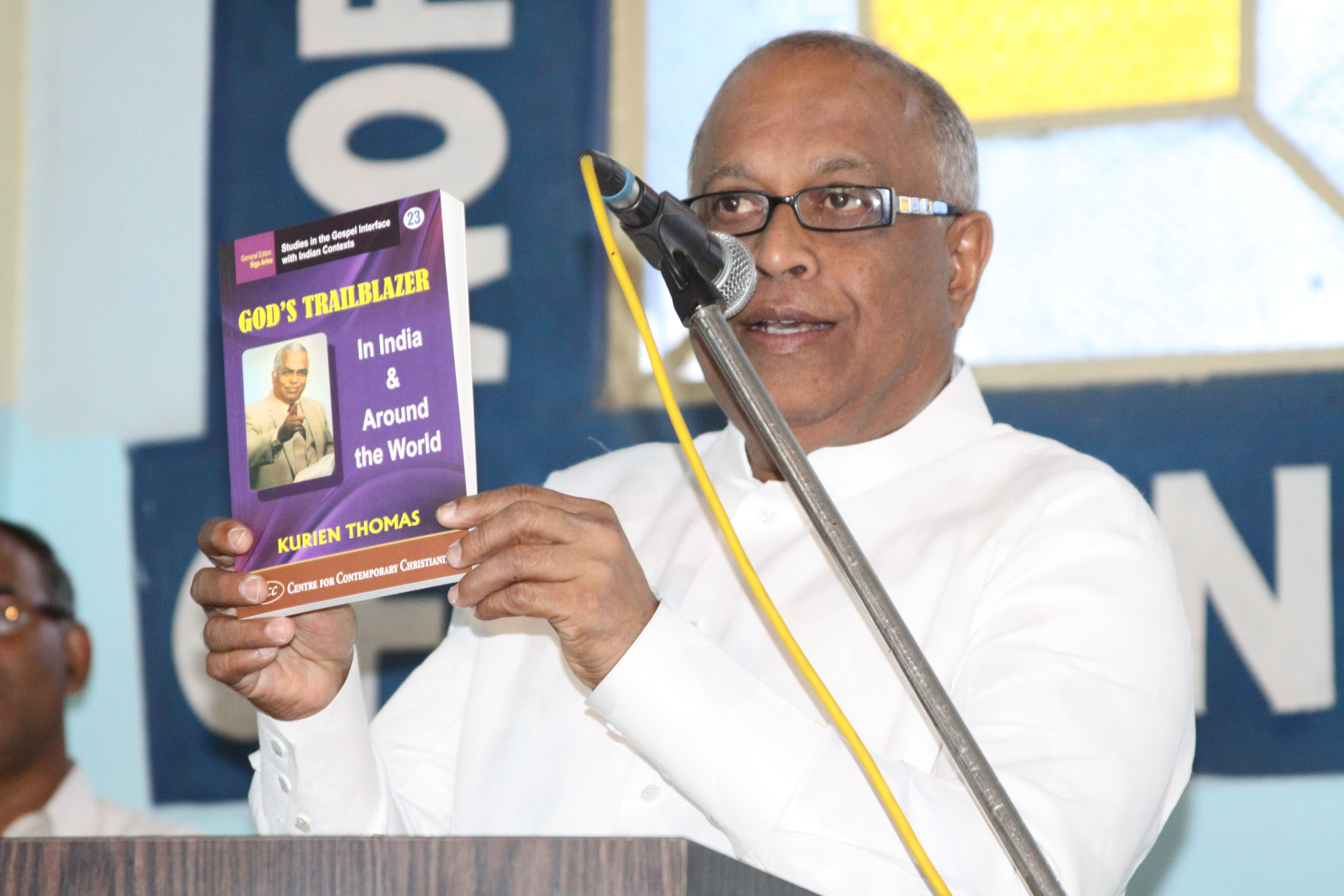
Matthew Thomas releasing the second edition of his father, Kurien Thomas', autobiography

Kurien Thomas also began a Hindi Christian magazine called Satyadoot in 1948.

The Fellowship of the Pentecostal Churches in India includes some 1200 congregations served by around 900 pastors. Pastor Kurien pastored the Pentecostal Church at Itarsi from 1945 until his death on October 19, 2000. He is now succeeded by his son, Matthew K. Thomas, who is also the Chairman of the Fellowship (FPCGI) and President/Principal of Central India Theological Seminary.

== Global ministry ==
At a meeting in Bhusawal in 1956, he was first invited by Rev. Hans Svartal to minister in his home country of Norway. On 9 August 1956, he left by train for Mumbai and boarded a ship on 14 August and reached London on 1 September, where he spoke the next day at a Pentecostal church. On August 9, 1956, he departed by train for Mumbai and boarded a ship to London on August 14. He arrived in London on September 1st and delivered a sermon the following day at a Pentecostal church. On September 26, he departed by the ship “Lada” for Bergan and continued his journey by train to Oslo. On 30 September 1956, he delivered a sermon at Salem Church with Rev. Hans Svartal as his interpreter. He continued ministering in Norway in various tent meetings and missionary meetings until 9 December.

He arrived on 10 December in Velanda, Sweden where he preached in a Pastors' seminar the next day. On 12 December he boarded his first flight from Stockholm to Helsinki and ministered at different places in Finland from 19 to 31 December.

In 1957, he visited the United States, where he noted, "as the Christians of Europe had accepted me as a brother in Christ, so did the believers in America give me the right hand of fellowship wherever I went."

Kurien embarked on extensive speaking engagements at churches and conferences across the globe, spanning Asia, Africa, Europe, and the Americas. He was a Fellow of the Royal Geographical Society. In 1972, on invitation from Aril Edvardsen, he spoke at the Sharons Dal Convention in Norway from July 16 to 23. Troens Bevis, the organization founded by Edvardsen supported the Fellowship work for several years since 1964.

Between 1976 and 1977, he ministered at churches and conferences in the United States, Norway, England, Switzerland, Kenya, and Tanzania. He also participated in a conference in Singapore in 1978 and between 1978 and 1985 ministered in various countries that included Sri Lanka, Germany, Switzerland, Norway, Bhutan, United States, various states in India, England, Sweden, Oman, Dubai, UAE, Philippines, and Mexico. In 1985, he submitted his doctoral thesis to the International Theological Seminary, California and was awarded Doctorate in Theology.

Dates	Important Events in the Life and Ministry of Dr. Kurien Thomas
1939	Kurien Thomas gets saved in K.E. Abraham's meetings at Kerala.
1945	Kurien Thomas comes with his wife as missionary to Itarsi.
1946	The first Pentecostal Conference in Itarsi.
1948	Satyadoot India's widely read Hindi Christian magazine is born.
1962	Bharosa Bible School begins with 7 students.
1966	The Fellowship of the Pentecostal Churches in India (FPCGI) is created with Pastor Kurien Thomas as Chairman.
1996	Kurien Thomas PG Studies and Research Center is established.
2000	Kurien Thomas dies.

== Selected bibliography ==
All writings were published by Central India Bible College, Itarsi.

- अतीत की पगडंडिया (Autobiography)
- परिणयगाथा (A Commentary on the Songs of Solomon)
- प्रकाशितवाक्‍य (A Commentary on Revelation)
- मिलापवाला तंबु (The Tabernacle)
- पवित्र आत्‍मा (Holy Spirit)
- धर्मविज्ञान प्रणाली (Systematic Theology)
- Ruth: Malayalam

== See also ==
- Central India Theological Seminary
- Fellowship of the Pentecostal Churches in India
- Matthew K. Thomas
