= Keezha Manakudy =

Village in Kanyakumari, Tamil Nadu, India

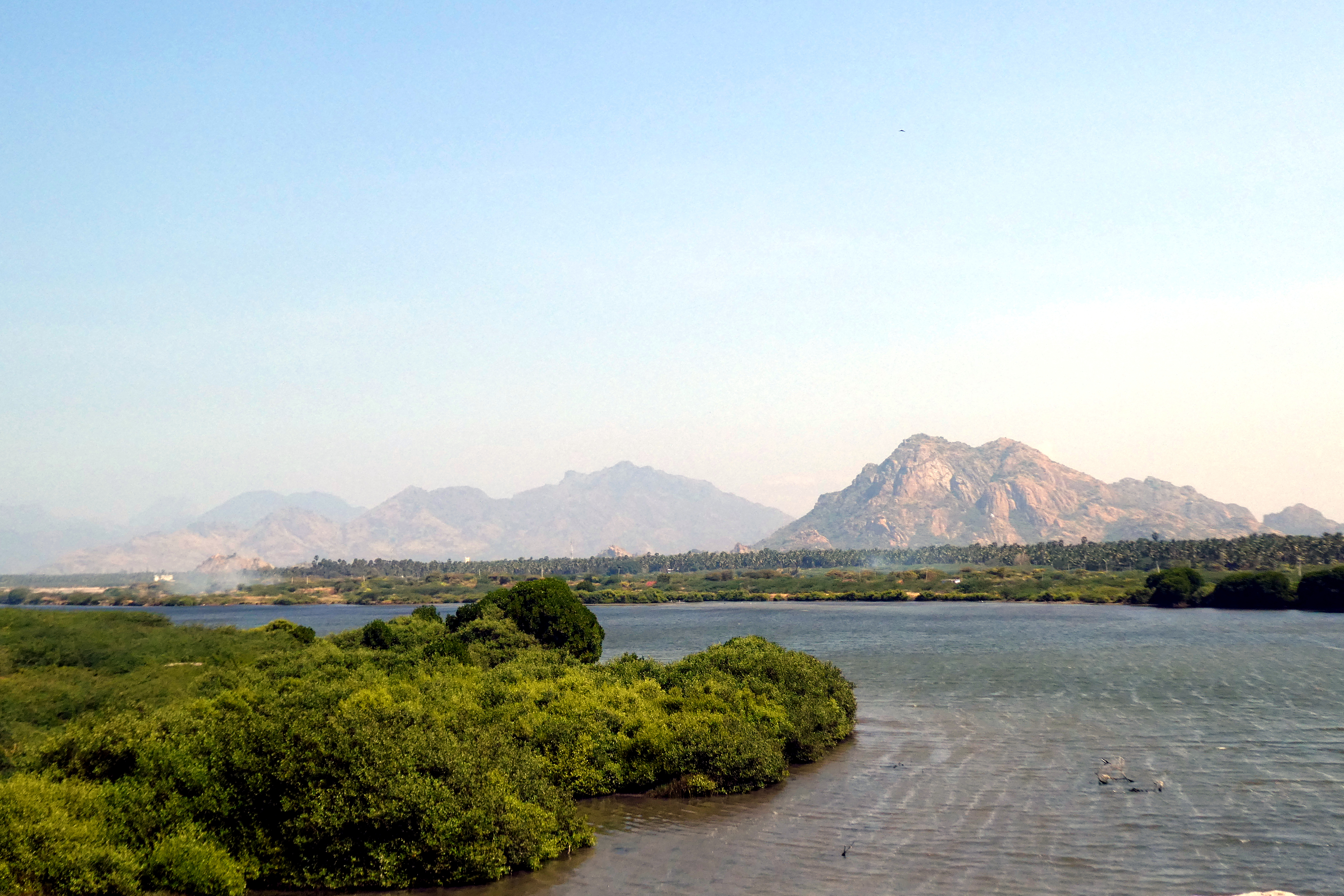
Lake east of Manakudy

Keezha Manakudy is one of the villages of Kanyakumari district, Tamil Nadu, India.
