= Fellowship of the Pentecostal Churches in India =

Christian organization in India

The Fellowship of the Pentecostal Churches of God in India has around 1,200 churches in its network with its headquarters at Itarsi, Madhya Pradesh, India. The fellowship unanimously re-elected Dr. Matthew K. Thomas as chairman during the October Fellowship Conference in 2008. The Fellowship is regarded as one of the largest independent Pentecostal churches in India.

== History ==
Fellowship of the Pentecostal Churches in India
- city
- Location in Madhya Pradesh, India
- Coordinates: 22.62°N 77.75°E
- Country: India
- State: Madhya Pradesh
- District: Hoshangabad
- Elevation: 305 m (1,001 ft)

Population (2001)
  - Total: 93,783

Languages
  - Official: Hindi
- Time zone: UTC+5:30 (IST)

As Pentecostal churches continued to spring all over India, the graduates of Central India Theological Seminary who worked mainly in the north, began to feel the need to form a Fellowship for closer fellowship. So, at the 1966 Annual Convention of the Pentecostal Church at Itarsi, the Christian workers united to form the Fellowship of the Pentecostal Churches of God in India (FPCGI). The first elected chairman of the Fellowship was Dr. Kurien Thomas, a pioneer Pentecostal missionary in north India, who held that position till 1984, "when it was unanimously decided that the burden should be placed upon...Thomas Matthews." The Fellowship was registered with the Indian Government in 1969 and had the following objectives:

To preach the Gospel in the whole of the land of India.

To establish independent Churches....

To oppose all doctrines that are not true to the clear teachings of the Bible.

The local Church should be free from any central rule or domination by any other Church, nor should one minister rule over another.

That each might help and encourage each other.

By 1992, the Fellowship had grown to 350 missionaries working in more than 14 states of India. By 2001, there were in it some 1200 congregations served by around 900 pastors. Pastor Kurien Thomas pastored the Headquarter Church at Itarsi from 1945 till his death in 2000. He is now succeeded by his son Dr. Matthew Thomas who is the chairman of the Fellowship (FPCGI), editor-in-chief of Basileia Theological Journal, and president/principal of Central India Theological Seminary.

== See also ==
- Kurien Thomas
- Matthew K. Thomas
