= Peter Fernando =

- Archbishop of Madurai
- Church: Catholic Church
- Archdiocese: Archdiocese of Madurai
- In office: 22 March 2003 – 26 July 2014
- Predecessor: Marianus Arokiasamy
- Successor: Antony Pappusamy
- Previous posts: Bishop of Tuticorin (1999-2003); Apostolic Administrator of Tiruchirapalli (1997-2001); Coadjutor Bishop of Tuticorin (1996-1999)

Orders
- Ordination: 29 May 1971
- Consecration: 29 May 1996 by Marianus Arokiasamy

Personal details
- Born: 22 March 1939 Idinthakarai (southeast of Vairavikinaru), Province of Madras, British Raj, British Empire
- Died: 31 December 2016 (aged 77)

Peter Fernando (22 March 1939 – 31 December 2016) was a Roman Catholic prelate from India.

== Early life ==
Bishop Peter Fernando was born in Idinthakarai, a coastal village of the district of Tirunelveli and a parish of Roman Catholic diocese of Tuticorin on 22 March 1939. He was ordained a priest for the diocese of Tuticorin on 31 May 1971.

== Episcopal ministry ==
On 23 February 1996, Bishop Peter Fernando was appointed coadjutor bishop of the Roman Catholic Diocese of Tuticorin, India and was ordained bishop on 29 May 1996; he succeeded Bishop Siluvaimathu Teresanathan Amalnather and served as diocesan bishop of the Tuticorin Diocese from 1999 to 2004. He was appointed as the apostolic administrator of the diocese of Trichy. He then served as archbishop of the Roman Catholic Archdiocese of Madurai from 2003 to 2014. He died on 31 December 2016.
