= Acharya K. K. Chandy =

Acharya K. K. Chandy (1908–2001) was the President Emeritus, Fellowship of Reconciliation (India). He was also the founding father of the Gurukul Ecumenical Center for Peace and also one of the three founder members of Christavashram, Kottayam.
