= Diocese of Coimbatore =

Diocese of Coimbatore may refer to:

- Anglican Diocese of Coimbatore
- Roman Catholic Diocese of Coimbatore
