= Manal Matha Shrine =

- Athisaya Manal Matha Shrine
- Manal Matha Shrine
- 8.336972°N 77.953286°E
- Country: India
- Denomination: Catholicism

History
- Founded: First century AD
- Founder: Thomas the Apostle

Administration
- Diocese: Tuticorin

Athisaya Manal Matha Shrine (Tamil: அதிசய மணல் மாதா, lit. 'Our Lady of Red Sands' ) is a shrine in southern Thoothukudi district of Tamil Nadu. The shrine belongs to the Sokkan Kudierappu Parish of the Diocese of Tuticorin. The shrine is surrounded by red sands and palm trees. A small lake (known as Tharuvai by the local people) is located near the shrine. It was once known as Kanakkan Kudieruppu, where several families lived in the Pandya kingdom. It's said that, as a result of the injustice in the kingdom, through a poor widow who was killed by the king, the whole village was covered by red sand in a sandstorm. It is considered a punishment given to the people and the king by God. Later in 1798, the church was discovered by a shepherd boy with the help of the people of Sokkan Kudieruppu.

Today, the Shrine is one of the sixteen shrines in the Diocese of Tuticorin. It is administered by the Sokkan Kudierappu parish. Saturday devotion is famous in the shrine, receiving visitors from southern Tamil Nadu and from some parts of Kerala, Andhra Pradesh, and Karnataka visit the shrine. Blessed Holy Meal is served to all the people, irrespective of caste and religion, on the first Saturday of every month. Ten days of feast are celebrated every year in September. It starts with the flag-hoisting on the Friday followed by The Feast of the Cross and ends with a grand Holy mass on the tenth day of the feast.
