= Mammen Chandy =

Indian hematologist

Mammen Chandy (born 30 August 1949) is a former director of Tata Medical Center, Kolkata. Chandy, an alumnus of Christian Medical College, Vellore, was involved in establishing the first bone marrow transplantation program in India at Christian Medical College, Vellore in 1986. In January 2019, Chandy was awarded the Padma Shri for his contribution to the field of medicine.

== Biography ==
Chandy graduated from Christian Medical College, Vellore in 1972 with a MBBS. He then joined the MD Medicine postgraduate programme in 1975. In 1979, Dr. Chandy was hired as a faculty member at his alma mater. He became Head of the Department of Hematology from 1987 to 2007, before retiring in 2009.

He did his fellowship in Hematology and Pathology at Westmead Center, Sydney, Australia and obtained his FRACP and FRCPA in 1985. After his fellowship, he rejoined the Department of Medicine at Christian Medical College and founded its clinical hematology unit. The unit was inaugurated as a separate unit in 1986.

== Notable medical work ==
In Christian Medical College Vellore, Chandy was the first to do a bone marrow transplant on a patient with thalassemia in 1986.

His team developed HLA laboratory, an assay for measuring Busufan levels by using the HPLC method, as well as establishing Diagnostic Molecular Biology tests for blood disorders.
