= Francis Tiburtius Roche =

Roman Catholic bishop

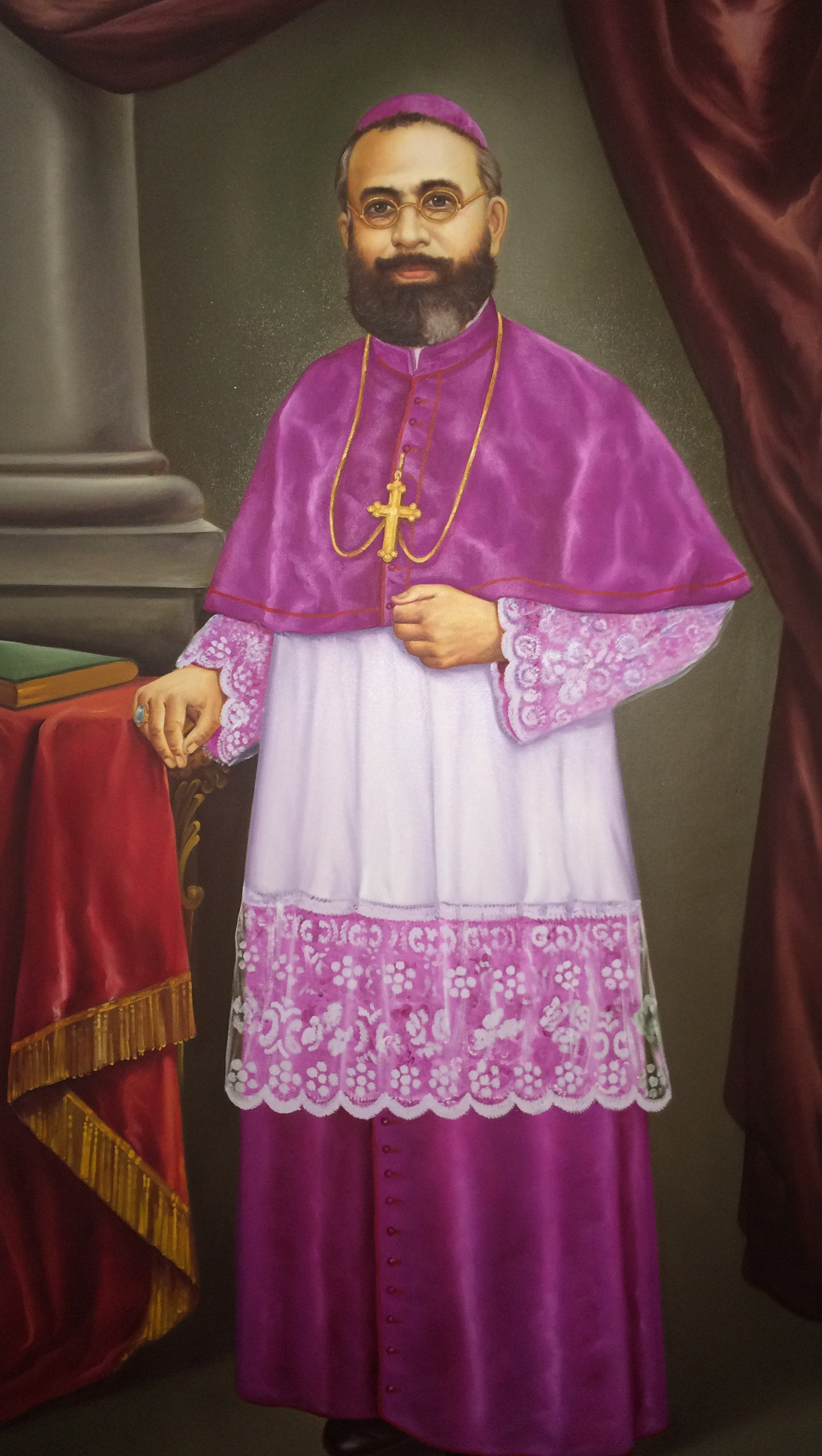
Francis Tiburtius Roche, first Indian Latin Catholic Bishop

Francis Tiburtius Roche, born the 14 April 1879 in Punnaikayal (Tamil Nadu, India) and died 17 December 1955 in Tuticorin, was an Indian (Tamil) Jesuit priest. In 1923 he was made the first bishop of the new Roman Catholic Diocese of Tuticorin.

== Early life ==
Bishop Francis Tiburtius Roche was born in Punnaikayal on 14 April 1879. He joined the Society of Jesus and was ordained a priest on 2 October 1910. When the Roman Catholic Diocese of Tuticorin was erected on 12 June 1923, he was appointed the first bishop of the diocese on the same day and was consecrated bishop on 23 September 1923. He is the first indigenous bishop of Latin Rite in India, in Asia, in China (first chinese bishop in 1926) and in Africa (first african bishop in 1939).

== Significance ==
He was the first native Indian bishop of Latin Church in the modern times and he was entrusted with the first Indian Latin Catholic diocese, the Diocese of Tuticorin with native priests. He was succeeded by Bishop Thomas Fernando and died on 17 December 1955.
