= Kootapuli =

- Village
- Location in Tamil Nadu, India
- Coordinates: 8.1511°N 77.6006°E
- Country: India
- State: Tamil Nadu
- District: Tirunelveli

Languages
  - Official: Tamil
- Time zone: UTC+5:30 (IST)
- PIN: 627127
- Telephone code: 04637
- Vehicle registration: TN 72

Kootapuli is a small coastal village in Radhapuram taluk, Tirunelveli district, Tamil Nadu, India. Kootapuli is close to the Koodankulam Nuclear Power Plant.

Kootapuli is 21 km (13 mi) east of Nagercoil, 98 km (61 mi) east of Trivandrum, 8 km (5.0 mi) east of Kanyakumari, 30 km (19 mi) southeast of Valliyoor, 10 km (6.2 mi) west of Kudankulam, 4 km (2.5 mi) east of Anjugramam and 90 km (56 mi) southeast of Tirunelveli.

In 2013, some residents of Kootapuli were involved in protests against the Kudankulam Nuclear Power Plant. In 2018, some residents were involved in the Thoothukudi violence, a series of protests that ended with police firing on civilians.
