= Central India Theological Seminary =

Theological institute in Itarsi, Madhya Pradesh

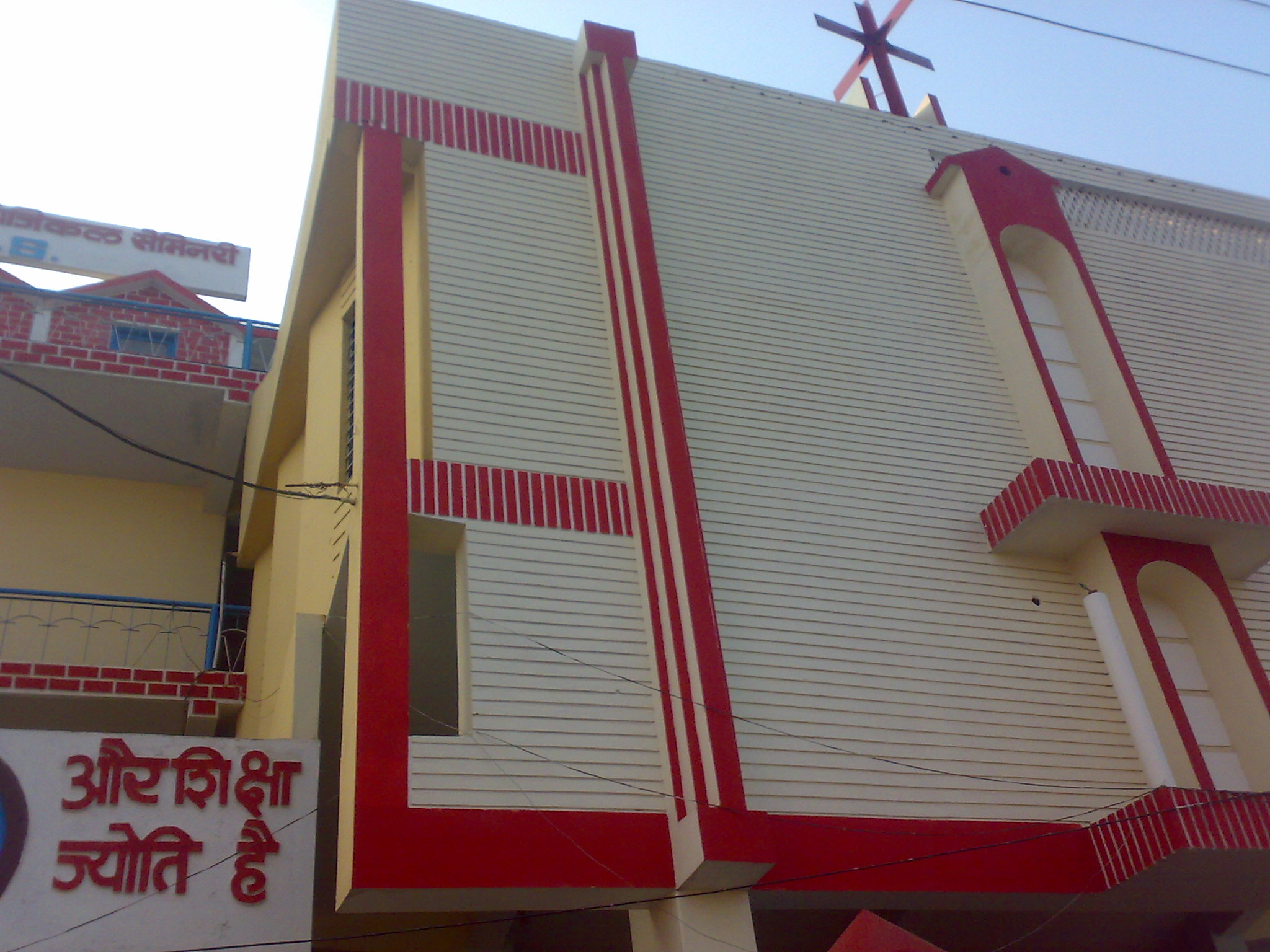
Front view of CITS Office & Study Block.

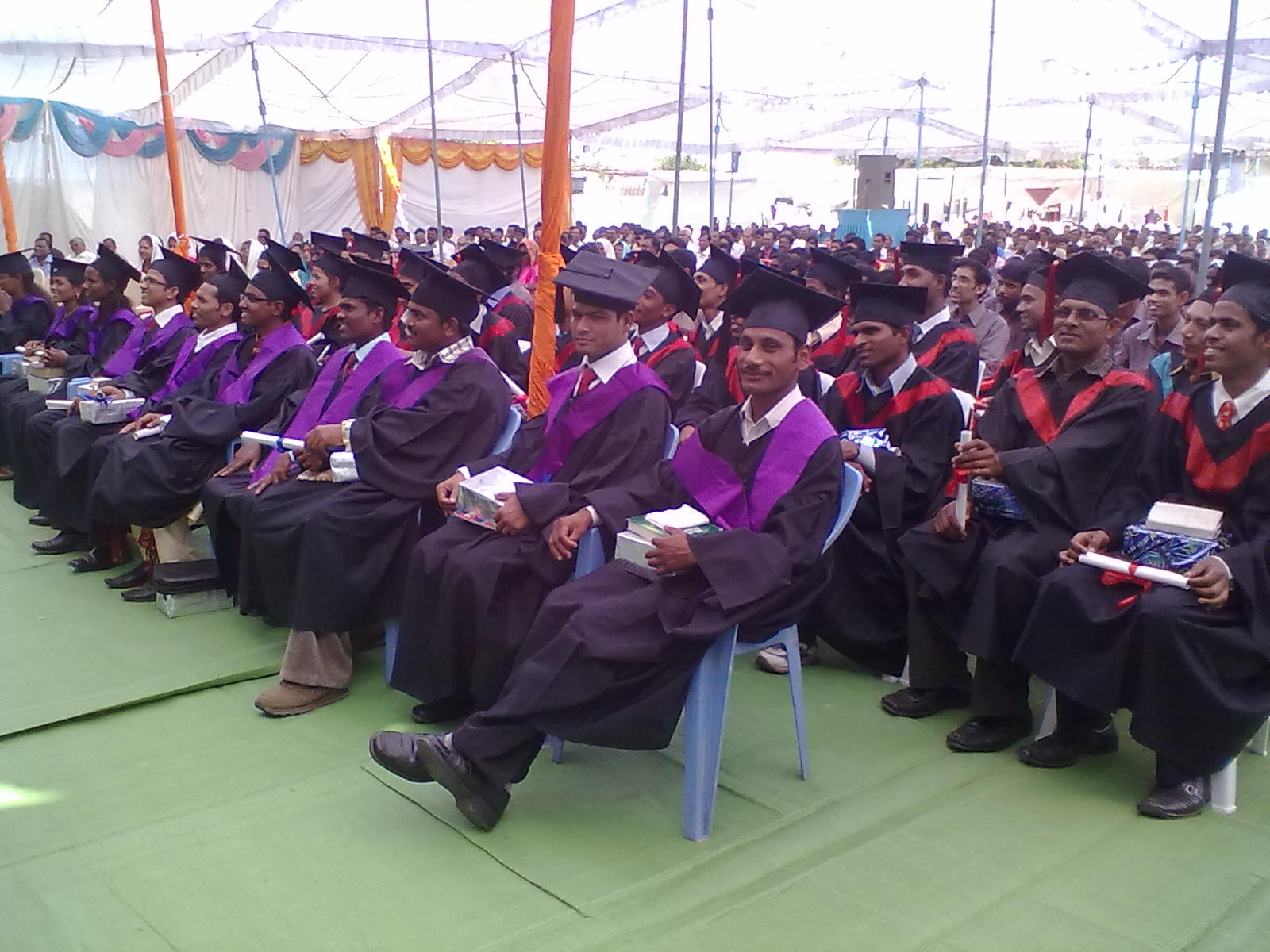
Graduation 2010

Central India Theological Seminary (CITS), located in Itarsi, Madhya Pradesh, India, is a Christian institution that offers a range of undergraduate and postgraduate programmes designed to equip students for ministry, scholarship, and Christian service. Its programs are accredited by Asia Theological Association.

== History ==
In 1962, Kurien Thomas, a Pentecostal missionary and pastor shared a vision with the local church to start a Bible School in Itarsi. Consequently, in July 1962 the Bharosa Bible School was born with the purpose of training Christian workers for evangelism, church planting, and Christian ministry. According to Kurien Thomas, "There was no Mission Board we could apply to for help. No bank account we could lean on.... We would have to walk from day-to-day trusting Him. The Bible School would have to run by Faith and so it was called "Bharosa Bible School." ("Bharosa" being the Hindi word for "Faith.") The School preliminary offered a three-month course with an enrollment of seven students that included A.J. Samuel who later served as pastor at Indore, K.V. Kurien who became pastor of the United States' then largest Indian Pentecostal Church in New York, Samuel R. Shri Sunder who joined the Norwegian Mission in India, and Sadhu Dewan Chand who became an itinerant preacher across India.

Students engaged in study at the Central India Theological Seminary

A few years later, it was renamed as Central India Bible College offering undergraduate programs. In 1999, under the Presidentship of Matthew K. Thomas, it was renamed as Central India Theological Seminary and began offering, in addition to the Bachelor of Theology program, the Master of Divinity program.

The Dr. Kurien Thomas Study and Research Center at Central India Theological Seminary initiated the Master of Theology program in Christian Apologetics in 2013. The Seminary began its Distance Education department in 2010 through which it offered the Master of Divinity program in Hindi medium.

== See also ==
- Kurien Thomas
- Fellowship of the Pentecostal Churches in India
- Matthew K. Thomas
