= Manal (name) =

Manal is a feminine given name of Arabic origin. Notable people with the name include:

- Manal Benchlikha, known as Manal (singer) (born 1993), Moroccan musical artist
- Manal Al Dowayan (born 1973), Saudi Arabian artist
- Manal Ajaj (born 1978), Syrian fashion designer
- Manal bint Mohammed Al Maktoum (born 1977), Emirati royal and politician
- Manal Awad Mikhail, Egyptian veterinarian and governor
- Manal Abdel Samad (born 1975), Lebanese politician
- Manal al-Sharif (born 1979), Saudi Arabian women's rights activist
- Manal Yunis (born 1929), Iraqi lawyer
