= Vairavikinaru =

Coordinates: 8°11′N 77°43′E

Vairavikinaru is a small village under Koodankulam Panchayath at Radhapuram Taluk in Tirunelveli District of Tamil Nadu State, India. Sri Pathirakali Amman Temple is located here which has the largest tower in Radhapuram Taluk. The location of the village is 68 km towards South from District headquarters Tirunelveli. 14 km from Radhapuram. 711 km from State capital Chennai.

The head post office is Koodankulam post office and PIN code is 627106.
