= Kandathil Mammen Philip =

Indian entrepreneur

- Born: May 2, 1912; Kottayam, Kerala, India
- Died: January 11, 2017 (aged 104); Chennai, Tamil Nadu, India
- Occupation: Entrepreneur
- Parent(s): K. C. Mammen Mappillai; Kunjandamma
- Awards: Padma Shri
- Website: Official web site

Kandathil Mammen Philip was an Indian entrepreneur from the South Indian state Kerala who was a director of MRF Limited and Malayala Manorama group with business interests in tea, coffee and cardamom plantations and processing.

He was also a director of many other companies such as Rembrandt and Vandykes Limited, Commercial Broadcasts Limited, India Coffee and Tea Distributing Company Limited and Balanoor Plantations and Industries Limited.

== Early life ==
he was born to K. C. Mammen Mappillai and Kunjandamma (Modisseril family) as the sixth of their nine children. Philip did his elementary education at M.D School and C.M.S college, Kottayam and then moved on to Loyola College, Chennai from where he graduated in Economics (Hons).

== Career ==
Philip is considered by many as the father of Indian rubber industry.

== Recognition ==
Philip was honored by the Government of India, in 2001, with the fourth highest Indian civilian award of Padma Shri. His eldest brother, Kandathil Mammen Cherian and one of his younger brothers, Kandathil Mammen Mathew are recipients of the Padma Bhushan award while another younger brother, K. M. Mammen Mappillai and one of his nephews, K. M. Mammen Mathew have won the Padma Shri award.

== Personal life ==
He was married to Chinnamma and they had two sons together, Mammen Philip and Peter Philip. He was active member of the YMCA and became the first Asian to be elected as the President of the World Alliance of YMCAs.

== See also ==
- MRF Limited
- Malayala Manorama
