= Onmanorama =

Indian digital news platform

- Logo used since 2016
- Status: Active
- Founded: 1998; 28 years ago
- Country of origin: India
- Headquarters location: Kottayam
- Owner: Malayala Manorama
- Official website: onmanorama.com

Onmanorama is the online English news portal of the Malayala Manorama group, which also publishes the Malayala Manorama newspaper, read by over 20 million Malayalis worldwide; Vanitha, the largest circulated women's magazine in India, The Week, an English weekly; and several other periodicals and children's books.

Onmanorama is headquartered at Kottayam in India's southernmost state of Kerala.

The news portal mainly covers developments in Kerala and the southern states of India. Its coverage ranges from daily breaking news to long-form and researched pieces in various fields like sports, entertainment, movies, lifestyle, food and travel.

Onmanorama is known for its hyperlocal coverage of Kerala. Other than its network of reporters, the portal uses the network of Malayala Manorama, Manorama News, and ManoramaOnline, the online version of the newspaper, for its stories.

== History ==
Onmanorama was established in 1998 as English Manoramaonline and was re-branded as Onmanorama in 2016.

== Notable people ==
- Mammen Mathew — Chief Editor, Malayala Manorama
- Jayant Mammen Mathew — Executive Editor, Malayala Manorama,
- Mariam Mammen Mathew — CEO, Manorama Online & Onmanorama

== Awards ==
- In 2016, World Association of Newspapers and News Publishers (WAN-IFRA) named Onmanorama as one of the top three news websites in South Asia.
- Onmanorama's News Documentary — Greener Pastures: 3 Unique Farmers, 1 Story ’ — won several national and international awards.
- In 2023, Onmanorama podcasts won top honours at India Audio Summit and Awards.
- Onmanorama's news documentary, 'Penntholpaavakoothu,' won the Best Short Documentary Award at the Seventh Art Independent Film Festival held in Thiruvananthapuram.
- 'Penntholpaavakoothu,' was also awarded the Best Documentary in the web category at the 13th Laadli Media & Advertising Awards for Gender Sensitivity 2023 - Regionals.
