= Annamma Mathew =

- Annamma Mathew, author of culinary literature in Malayalam
- Born: 22 March 1922; Godavari district, Andhra Pradesh
- Died: 10 July 2003 (aged 81); Kottayam, Kerala
- Other name: Mrs. K. M. Mathew
- Occupations: Founder and chief editor of Vanitha
- Known for: Author of culinary literature
- Spouse: K. M. Mathew

Annamma Mathew, 22 March 1922 – 10 July 2003), also known as Mrs. K. M. Mathew, was the founder chief editor of Vanitha, the largest selling women's magazine in India, and wife of K. M. Mathew, Chief Editor of Malayala Manorama. She died after a brief illness at a private nursing home in Kottayam, Kerala in India.

She was an author of culinary literature and tips for new recipes in Malayalam. She authored 17 cook books in Malayalam and 4 in English and also made contributions in the areas of journalism, music, cookery and social welfare.

== Early life ==
She was born on 22 March 1922, in Godavari district of Andhra Pradesh, where her father was a surgeon in the Madras civil service. She got married at the age of 20 to K. M. Mathew, then a planter and the then future Chief Editor of Malayala Manorama. She sharpened her talents in culinary art, which she inherited from her father, during her days with him.

A new turn in her life came when her Father-in-law, K. C. Mammen Mappillai, asked her to prepare a recipe to be published in Malayala Manorama.

== Contributions ==
She was also the main columnist in tips for new recipes through a regular media column "Pachaka Vidhi" (The method of cooking) in Malayalam. She entered a new phase with the launching of Vanitha in 1975. She was the first chief editor and continued in the post till the end of her life. She was also involved in social activities through the Kasturba Social Welfare Centre in Kottayam, which aims at empowering women.

She authored over 20 books on subjects ranging from cookery, health and beauty care and hair styling to floristry and travel. She was also a columnist and most of her recipes available in popular publications.

== Awards ==
Her contributions to journalism fetched her several honors and won a number of awards, including the Rachel Thomas Award (1992), 'Vignanadeepam Puraskaram' (1994) and 'Nirmithi Kendra' Award (1996).

== Death ==
Annamma was suffering from age-related diseases throughout her later life, and finally died in a private nursing home on 10 July 2003 aged 81. She was buried the next day in a church near her home. Her husband outlived her for seven years, and was buried near her in 2010. She is now survived by her four children – three sons and a daughter; children-in-law and grandchildren.
