= The Week (Indian magazine) =

Indian news magazine

- Editor: Philip Mathew
- Categories: News magazine
- Frequency: Weekly
- Publisher: Jacob Mathew
- Founder: K. M. Mathew
- Founded: December 1982; 43 years ago
- First issue: 26 December 1982
- Company: The Malayala Manorama Co. Pvt. Ltd.
- Country: India
- Based in: Kochi
- Language: English
- Website: www.theweek.in

The Week is an Indian news magazine founded in the year 1982 and published by The Malayala Manorama Co. Pvt. Ltd. The magazine is published from Kochi and is currently printed in Delhi, Mumbai, Bengaluru and Kottayam. According to the Audit Bureau of Circulations, it is the largest circulated English news magazine in India.

The magazine covers politics, entertainment, social issues, trends, technology and lifestyle.

== History ==
=== Chief editors ===
The Week was launched by The Malayala Manorama Co. Ltd in December, 1982, and has had two chief editors, before the designation was discontinued.

- K. M. Mathew (Padma Bhushan, 1998), the founder chief editor, remained in office until 25 December 1988. Popularly known as Mathukuttychayan, he was chairman of the Press Trust of India, president of the Indian Newspaper Society and chairman of the Audit Bureau of Circulations. He died on 1 August 2010. The obit which appeared in The Times of India said, "The highly acclaimed English news magazine-The Week-was his brainchild."
- K. M. Mathew's eldest son, Mammen Mathew, (Padma Shri, 2005), took over on 1 January 1989, and continued until 9 December 2007. He is currently chief editor of the Malayala Manorama daily, the group's flagship publication.

Currently, The Week does not have a chief editor. K. M. Mathew's second son, Philip Mathew, managing editor since 1 January 1989, is the highest-ranked editor.

=== Publishers ===
- Philip Mathew, the first publisher of the magazine, held the post until December 1988.
- Jacob Mathew: 1 January 1989 till date. K.M. Mathew's third son, he is currently president of WAN-IFRA. He is the second Asian and the first Indian to hold the post.

=== Editors ===
The magazine has had two editors, after which the designation was discontinued.

- V. K. B. Nair: 26 December 1982 to 3 June 1984.
- T. V. R. Shenoy (Padma Bhushan, 2003): 10 June 1984 to 11 December 1988.

=== Editor-in-charge ===
Currently, the editor-in-charge is responsible for selection of news under The Press and Registration of Books Act, 1867. The present editor-in-charge, V.S. Jayaschandran, took over on 1 April 2017.

== Design and style ==
The magazine was initially designed in-house, and was periodically redesigned. A major content overhaul was led by Peter Lim, author and former editor-in-chief of The Straits Times/Singapore Press Holdings. He authored the book Chronicle of Singapore: Fifty Years of Headline News.

The two major redesigns were led by:

- Peter Ong on 8 November 1998.
- Dr Mario Garcia on 20 February 2005.

Based in Sydney, Australia, Ong was formerly Picture & Graphics Editor of The Straits Times. He is principal consultant at Checkout Australia, and was regional director for the Society of News Design. Garcia owns the premier newspaper design firm, Garcia Media. Both of them also helped redesign the Malayala Manorama.

In the early years, cartoonist Mario Miranda designed many covers for The Week. He also had a regular pocket cartoon in the magazine.

The Week does not have published stylebook, but generally follows the down style for capitalisation. Its dateline carries the pull date, not the date of issue.

== Columnists ==
The Week has these regular guest columns:

- Ivory Tour by Sanjaya Baru
- DeTour by Shobhaa De
- Forthwrite by Meenakshi Lekhi.
- Mani-festo by Mani Shankar Aiyar
- Last Word by Shashi Tharoor, Barkha Dutt, Navtej Sarna and Bibek Debroy
- Schizo-Nation by Anuja Chauhan.
- Sound Bite by Anita Pratap.

In addition to the guests, there are two staff columns.

- Power Point by K. S. Sachidananda Murthy, resident editor in New Delhi.
- PMO Beat by R. Prasannan, chief of bureau, New Delhi.

=== Former columnists ===
Former columnists of the magazine include Priyanka Chopra, Khushwant Singh, Saurav Ganguly, General Bikram Singh (retd), P. C. Alexander, Binayak Sen, Sania Mirza, Saina Nehwal, Swara Bhasker, Sanjay Manjrekar, R. N. Malhotra, Sanjana Kapoor, A. P. Venkateswaran, Harsha Bhogle, Sreenivasan Jain, Mallika Sarabhai, Nandita Das, Manjula Padmanabhan, Amjad Ali Khan, Santosh Desai and Antara Dev Sen, among others.

== Supplements and stand-alones ==
Two supplements go free with The Week:

- Health, a fortnightly on health and fitness.
- The Wallet, a monthly guide to personal finance and investment.

The standalone magazines are:

- The Man: The Man, a monthly lifestyle magazine for men
- WatchTime India: A quarterly magazine on luxury watches
- Smartlife: A monthly magazine on wellness and lifestyle
- Livingetc: A monthly magazine on home and interiors

== The Week Hay Festival ==
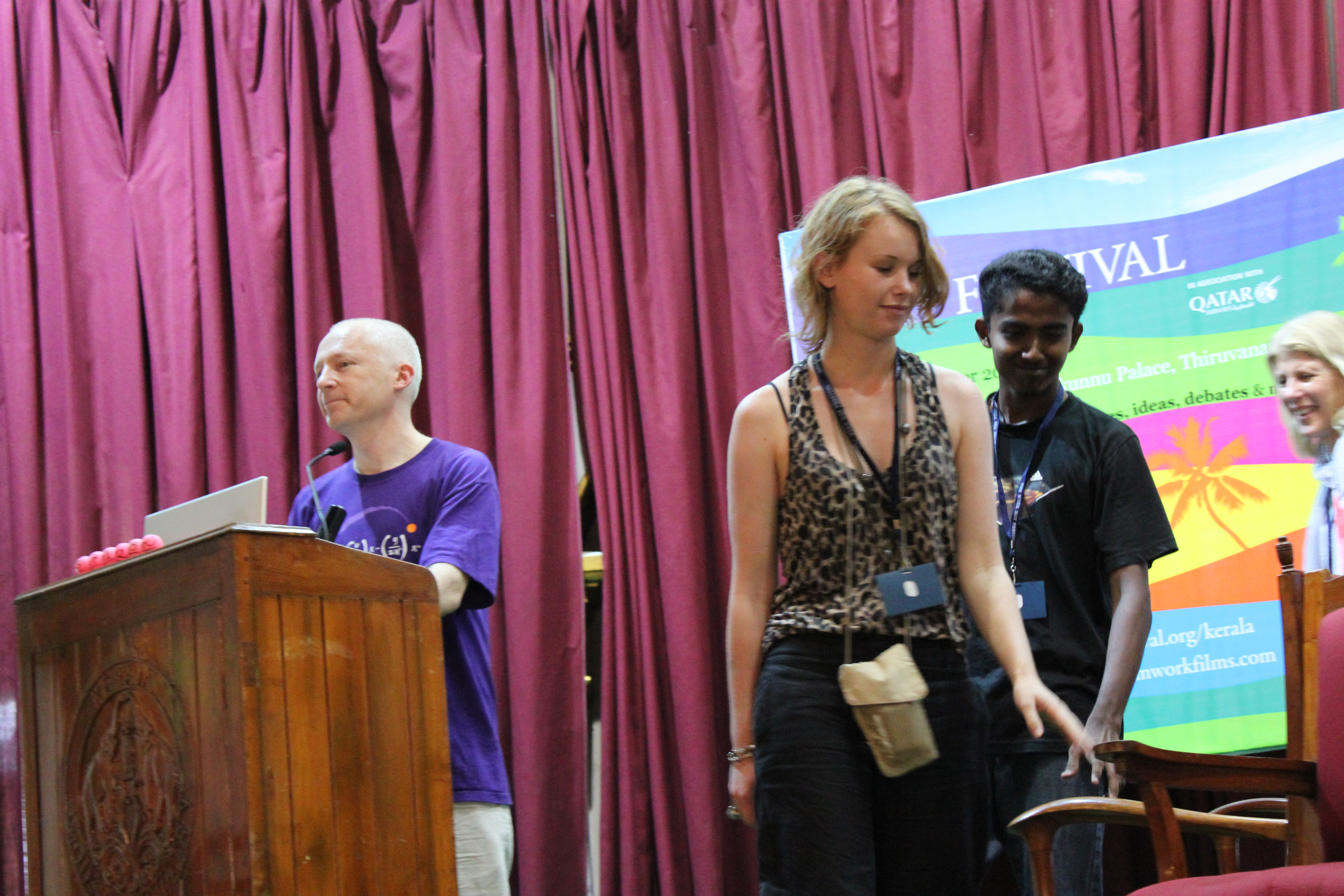
Oxford mathematician Marcus du Sautoy (in purple shirt) at The Week Hay Festival 2010

=== Hay Kerala 2010 ===
The Week was the title sponsor, of the inaugural Hay Festival in India. Held in Thiruvananthapuram, Kerala, from 12 to 14 November 2010, the festival was held at Kanakakunnu Palace, the former summer retreat of the Travancore royal family.

Writers and speakers for the event included Mani Shankar Aiyar, Rosie Boycott, Gillian Clarke, William Dalrymple, Tishani Doshi, Sonia Faleiro, Sebastian Faulks, Nik Gowing, Manu Joseph, N. S. Madhavan, Jaishree Misra, Vivek Narayanan, Michelle Paver, Basharat Peer, Hannah Rothschild, K. Satchidanandan, Marcus du Sautoy, Simon Schama, Vikram Seth, C. P. Surendran, Miguel Syjuco, Shashi Tharoor, Amrita Tripathi, Pavan Varma and Paul Zacharia.

The event closed with a concert by Bob Geldof, where Sting made a surprise appearance.

== Awards ==
Year	Awardee	Award	Agency	Story
2000	Jayant Mammen Mathew & Maria Abraham	SAJA Journalism Award	South Asian Journalists Association (U.S.)	Rural reporting
2002	Deepak Tiwari	The Sarojini Naidu Prize	The Hunger Project (India)	Women in panchayati raj
2007	The Week	Media Excellence Award	Amity (India)	Business reporting
2007	Dnyanesh V. Jathar	Excellence in Journalism Award	Ramnath Goenka Foundation (India)	Life of AIDS orphans
2008	Bidisha Ghosal	The Statesman Award for Rural Reporting	The Statesman Ltd (India)	Sexual exploitation of widows in Vidarbha
2009	Bidisha Ghosal	IPI-India Award (Shared)	International Press Institute, India Chapter (India)	Sexual exploitation of widows in Vidarbha
2009	Kavitha Muralidharan	PII-ICRC Award	Press Institute of India & International Committee of the Red Cross (India)	Abduction of Tamil rebels by the Sri Lankan Army
2010	Mathew T. George	Excellence in Journalism (International)	Union Catholique Internationale de la Presse (Burkina Faso)	Robertsonian translocation among Bhopal gas tragedy victims
2010	Syed Nazakat	Finalist for Daniel Pearl International Award	Daniel Pearl Foundation (Switzerland)	Multiple investigative stories
2010	The Week	Gold (Magazine cover design)	WAN-IFRA (Malaysia)	Cover for Health
2010	The Week	Gold (Special issue)	WAN-IFRA (Malaysia)	On 25 years after Indira Gandhi
2011	Bhanu Prakash Chandra	Gold (Feature photography)	WAN-IFRA (Thailand)	Biking through the Himalayas
2011	The Week	IPI India award for excellence in journalism (shared)	International Press Institute (India)	Fake medical and dental colleges
2021	Bhanu Prakash Chandra, Lakshmi Subramanian	IPI India Award for Excellence in Journalism-2021 (shared)	International Press Institute (India)	Refugee camps in Syria, Iraq

In 2001, Special Cover Designer Ajay Pingle entered the Limca Book of Records for designing the most number of covers for an Indian newsmagazine.

== Man of the Year ==
- 2009 – Brother Christudas, for Little Flower Leprosy Welfare Association
- 2010 – Satinath Sarangi, for voicing Bhopal disaster victims
- 2011 – Ajeet Singh, for Guria
- 2018 – Nilesh Desai, Lighting up the Darkness
- 2019 – Madhav Gadgil, for his work in ecology
- 2020 – Sonu Sood, for his humanitarian efforts during the pandemic
- 2021 – Balram Bhargava, ICMR Director-General
- 2022 – Neeraj Chopra, Olympics athlete, Javelin thrower
- 2023 – S. Somanath, Chairman ISRO
- 2025 – Shubhanshu Shukla, Member of Axiom Mission 4

== Couple of the Year ==
- 2017 – Ramesh Awasthi and Manisha Gupte

== Controversies ==
The magazine was mired in controversy for an article on Vinayak Damodar Savarkar. In response to a defamation suit filed by Ranjit Savarkar, the magazine publicly apologised for the publication of the article.
