= Manorama School of Communication =

Journalism school in Kottayam, India

- Motto: Training tomorrow's journalists
- Director: K. Thomas Oommen
- Location: Kottayam, Kerala, India
- Website: manoramajschool.com

Manorama School of Communication, also known as MASCOM, is a journalism school in Kottayam, India. Established in 2002 by K. M. Mathew with the support of Manorama group, it offers postgraduate diploma courses in print and broadcast journalism.

Educator and journalist K. Thomas Oommen worked as the director of the institute since its establishment until his retirement in July 2021. He has also designed the programme for the print course. The broadcast journalism course was introduced later in 2015.

Over the years, Manorama School of Communication has been listed as one of the best journalism schools in India by several media outlets. Observers have chiefly praised the institute for its infrastructure and focus on academic aspects of journalism.

== History ==
Journalist and chief-editor of Kottayam-based daily Malayala Manorama K. M. Mathew wanted to set up a media school which taught journalism with a "hands-on and no-nonsense approach and without frills and hype". His plans materialised when, with the support of the Manorama group as he established the Manorama School of Communication (MASCOM) in 2002 in Erayil Kadavu, Kottayam, around 500 meters south of the Malayala Manorama head office. The institute was inaugurated later that year by the-then Chief Minister of Kerala, A. K. Antony.

== Academics ==
Manorama School of Communication offers training in both print and broadcast journalism in English and Malayalam languages. The print course was designed by journalist and educator K. Thomas Oommen, who has served as the director of the institute since its inception in 2002. The course, its design and modules, have often been highlighted as amongst the best in India by various media outlets such as the Outlook magazine.

The broadcast course, also taught in both English and Malayalam languages, was introduced later in 2015. Journalists Andur Sahadevan and A. Ravi Shankar, who is also the associate director for the institute, teach the broadcast module.

Manorama School of Communication also has a student exchange programme with the Lakshman Kadirgamar Foundation, The Editors’ Guild of Sri Lanka, and the Sri Lanka Press Institute. The student topping the print course gets an opportunity to work in Sri Lanka as part of the programme, while a student from Sri Lanka also gets a six month training at the institute alongside the students of the print course.

=== Academic awards ===
Manorama School of Communication presents annual awards to its students for academic excellence. The K. C. Mammen Mappillai Award is presented to the overall best student from both the print and broadcast courses, while the a student each from print and broadcast respectively are also presented with the Malayala Manorama Chief Editor's Award.

== Rankings ==
Manorama School of Communication has been included in the various media outlets' lists of top journalism schools in India; these are listed below in the order of rank.

2014
- No. 2 The Edutainment Awards
- No. 7 Outlook
- – The Hindu

2017
- No. 8 Outlook

2018
- No. 4 Dainik Jagran
- No. 9 Outlook
- No. 10 India Today

2019
- No. 9 Outlook
- No. 12 India Today
