= Manorama Weekly =

Malayalam language Magazine

- Chief editor: Mammen Varghese
- Editor: Mammen Mathew
- Editor in charge: M.S Dileep
- Categories: Local interest magazine
- Publisher: Manorama Group
- First issue: 8 August 1937; 89 years ago
- Country: India
- Based in: Kottayam & Kozhikode
- Language: Malayalam
- Website: emagazine.manoramaonline.com

Manorama Weekly is a weekly Malayalam language local interest magazine published by Manorama Group of publications from Kottayam, India. It started publishing on 8 August 1937. With a circulation of 5,82,180 copies (as per July–December 2010 survey by Audit Bureau of Circulation), it is the largest selling weekly in India. Along with Mangalam Weekly, it is the most popular magazine among Keralites, especially among homemakers. They have acquired the collective sobriquet of "Ma" publications on account of their name and content.
