= Tô Linh Hương =

Vietnamese businesswoman (born 1988)

- Born: 1988 (age 37–38); Hà Nội
- Agent: Vinaconex - PVC
- Known for: CEO
- Political party: Communist Party of Vietnam
- Parent: Tô Huy Rứa

Tô Linh Hương (born 1988 in Hanoi) is a Vietnamese businesswoman. She is the former chairwoman and CEO of state-run real estate company Vinaconex - PVC (PVV), a construction investment joint-stock company. Its revenue in 2012 was estimated at 950 billion Dong (about $50 million). She held the post from April 2012 to June 2012, when she resigned; her term would have otherwise lasted until April 2016.

== Early life and education ==
Tô Linh Hương was born in 1988. She studied at the Vietnam Academy of Journalism and Communication, where her father serves as the director. She graduated with a Bachelor of Arts degree. Additionally, she engaged in extracurricular activities with the Ho Chi Minh Communist Youth Union, an organization known for training communist party leaders such as Vietnam’s PM Nguyễn Tấn Dũng and General Secretary of the Communist Party, Nguyễn Phú Trọng.

Hương graduated with honours in 2009. The topic of her graduate dissertation was Foreign Public Relations in Times of Political Crisis. In 2011, she earned her master's degree in international business from the University of Birmingham.

== Personal life ==
Hương is the daughter of Tô Huy Rứa, Chief of Central Committee of the Communist Party of Vietnam. He is also a member of the Standing Committee of the Vietnam's Politburo.

On April 14, 2012, Hương was appointed chairman and CEO of PVV at an annual general meeting of shareholders. Hương is known as a 'Red Offspring', a name commonly used for children of past and present communist national and provincial leaders in Vietnam.
