= K. M. Mammen Mappillai =

Indian businessman

- Born: Kandathil Mammen Mappillai; 28 November 1922; Kerala, India
- Died: 3 March 2003 (aged 80)

Kandathil Mammen Mammen Mappillai (28 November 1922 – 3 March 2003) was an Indian businessman, industrialist and founder of MRF.

He graduated from Madras Christian College. He started his industrial life with a toy balloon manufacturing unit from a small shed near Madras (now Chennai) in 1946. By 1952, MRF Limited ventured into the manufacture of tread rubber. Since then, the company has grown to become a US$3.2 billion enterprise.

In 1992, Mappillai was awarded the Padma Shri award for his contribution to industry. His brothers, K. M. Cherian, K. M. Philip and K. M. Mathew and nephew Mammen Mathew are also Padma Shri awardees. The eldest brother K. M. Cherian is also a Padma Bhushan recipient. His cousin M. K. Mathulla also was awarded Padma Shri.

== Controversy ==
Mammen Mappillai is believed to be in the list of 18 names of account-holders in LGT Group and LGT Bank.
