= C. P. Mathen =

Indian politician (1890–1960)

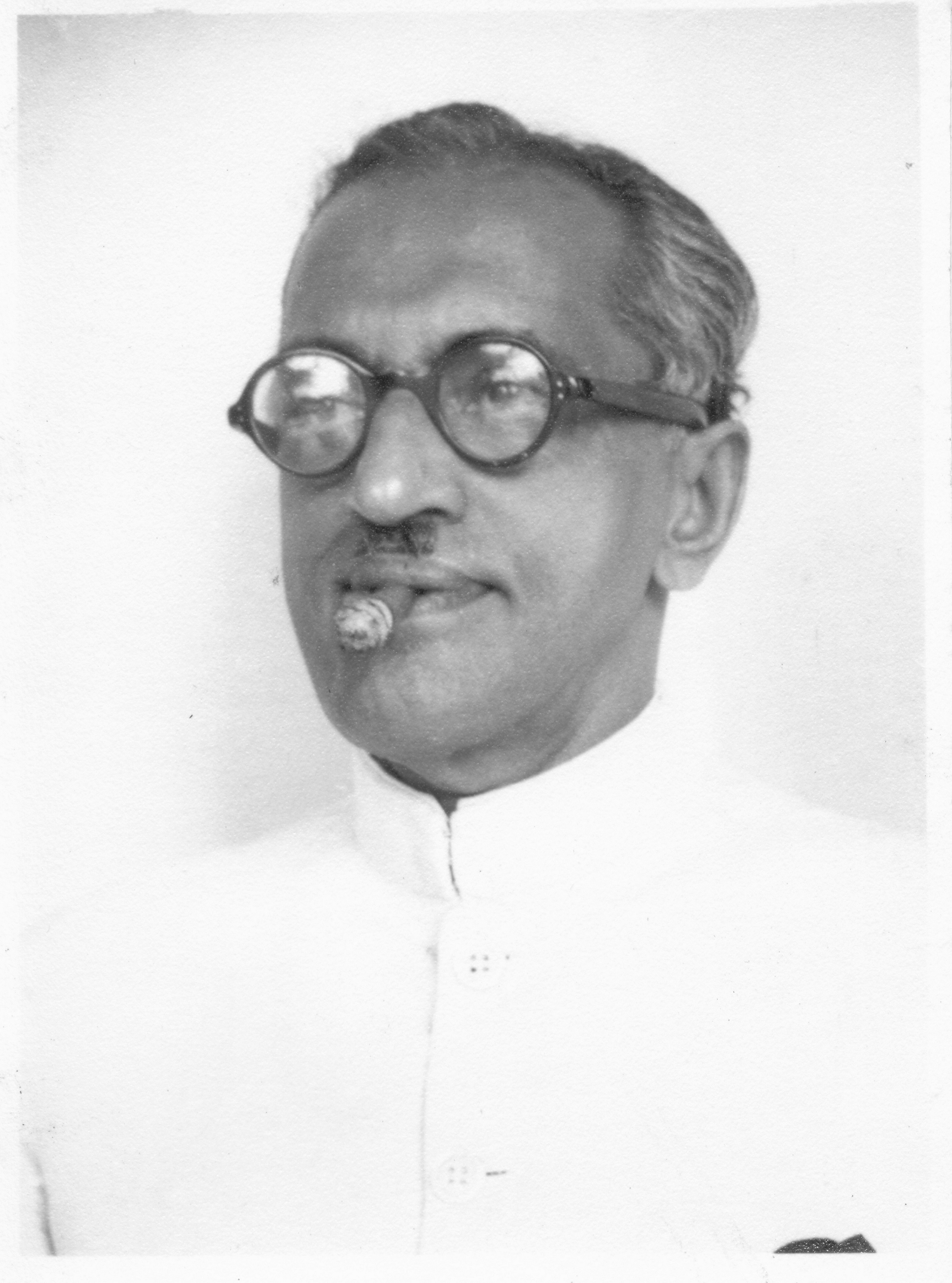

Member of Parliament, Lok Sabha
- In office 1952 – 1957
- Preceded by: Office established
- Succeeded by: P. K. Vasudevan Nair
- Constituency: Thiruvalla

Personal details
- Born: 18 May 1890 Thiruvalla, Kingdom of Travancore, British India (present day Pathanamthitta, Kerala, India)
- Died: 2 June 1960 (aged 70) Paris, Île-de-France, France
- Party: Indian National Congress
- Spouse: Elizabeth
- Children: Paulose (1917 - 2000); Varugis (1919 - 1999); Omana (1922 - 2011); Mariamma (1924 - ????); Eliamma (1926 - 2017); Sara (1928 - 2024); Susanna (1930 - 2021); Sheila (1932 - 2004)
- Occupation: Banker; Businessman; Politician; Diplomat

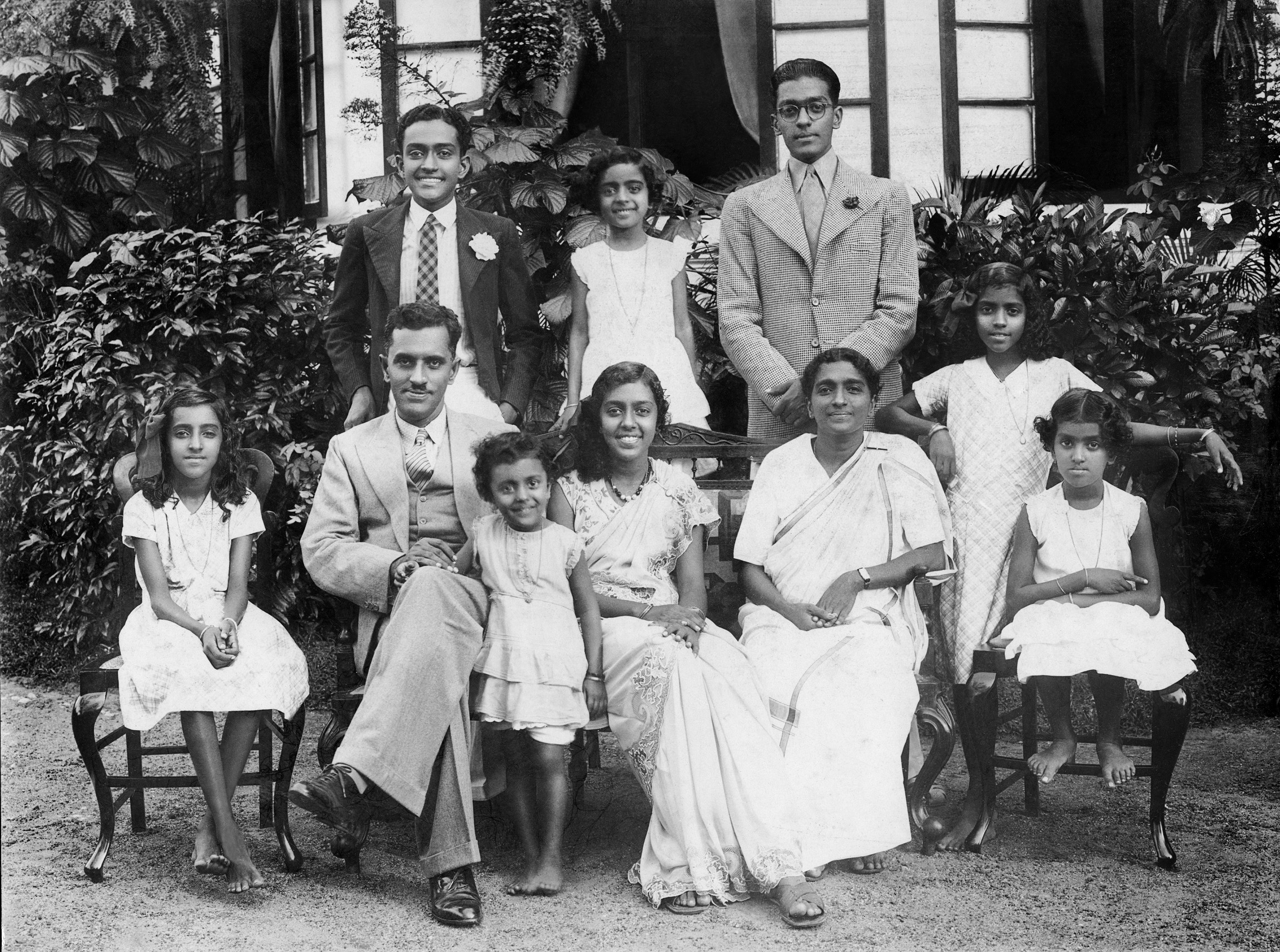
The Chalakuzhy family at "Ingle Dene", Trivandrum, 1937

Chalakuzhy Paulose Mathen (18 May 1890 – 2 June 1960) was an Indian politician who served as a member of the Indian Parliament in the first Lok Sabha, constituted in 1952 after India gained independence from the United Kingdom. He represented the Thiruvalla constituency of Kerala. Mathen was appointed the Indian Ambassador to Sudan after his single term in the Lok Sabha.

Before his entry into politics, Mathen was a businessman with interests in cashew, minerals, insurance, plantations and banking. He was responsible for starting the Alleppey Chamber of Commerce. He was Managing Director of the Travancore National and Quilon Bank (TN&Q Bank) when it suffered a run of unprecedented length that forced it to close. The bank run was said to have been escalated by Sir C. P. Ramaswami Iyer, the Diwan of Travancore, in an attempt to reduce the power of the Christian Community who were agitating for fair representation in the governing council of the Princely State. Mathen was extradited from Madras Presidency and imprisoned in Trivandrum, allegedly for balance sheet irregularities. He was sentenced to rigorous imprisonment but offered many chances to walk free if he would acknowledge guilt. Mathen refused these offers, maintaining his innocence for more than three years. He became something of a folk hero for his uncompromising stand. He was released on 22 January 1942 without condition or explanation and returned to Madras.

== Early life ==
C. P. Mathen was born to C. M. Paulose son of Mammen of the Chalakuzhy family in central Travancore, in Kavumbhagom, Thiruvalla. Mathen went to Madras for his Bachelor of History degree at Madras Christian College (MCC). He completed his education with a Bachelor of Laws.

== Insurance and Banking ==
At the age of 29, Mathen raised Rs.56,000 in capital and Rs.54,000 in deposits and started a bank that he called the Quilon Bank with its headquarters in Kollam (Quilon), The Quilon Bank headquarter building was then constructed and completed in 1935. In a relatively short span of 15 years, the bank's total working capital rose from Rs.1,56,000 to Rs.1,02,46,000.

Another leading Travancore businessman of that era was K. C. Mammen Mappillai, whose interests were not only in banking - his bank was called the Travancore National Bank - but also in journalism, newspaper publishing and politics, his heart was actually in journalism. He was the Chief Editor of a Travancore newspaper, Malayala Manorama.

Mammen and Mathen had started an insurance company together, and the commercial success of this new venture led them to amalgamate their respective banks in 1937. The registered office remained at the Quilon Bank headquarters in Travancore but the main business of the bank was conducted from its central office in Madras where its primary shareholders were based. Sir CP Ramaswami Iyer, encouraged this arrangement by offering to place Rs 7,000,000 of Travancore treasury money with the merged bank but this offer was never fulfilled.

The TN&Q Bank was the fourth-largest bank in India and the largest in South India. It had 75 branches in British India, Travancore, Cochin, the Malabar, Coorg, Mysore and Ceylon: Alleppey, Alwaye, Athirampuzha, Bangalore City, Bangalore Cantt.(South Parade Road), Bangalore Cantt.(Central Street), Bombay, Calcutta, Calicut, Changanacherry, Chirayinkil, Cochin, Coimbatore, Colombo, Coonoor, Cuddapah, Devicolam, Dindigul, Ernakulam, Erode, Galle, Hyderabad, Jaffna, Kandy, Karaikudi, Kayamkulam, Kottayam, Kumbakonam, Madras: Anderson Hall, G.T., Flower Bazaar, Mount Road, Triplicane, Mylapore, Vepery, Thyagarayanagar, Royapettah, Madura, Mangalore, Marthandorn, Mercara, Munnar, Mysore, Nagercoil, New Delhi, Ootacamund, Palghat, Parur, Perumpavoor, Pollachi, Poona, Pudukottah, Quilon, Quilon Sub Office, Rajapalayam, Salem, Secunderabad, Shertallai, Srirangam, Tellicherry, Tenkasi, Tinnevelly, Tinnevelly Junction, Tirupur, Thiruvella, Trichinopoly (25 Lascjar Street), Trichinopoly (Chinnakadai Teppakulam), Trichur, Trippunittura, Trivandrum (Main Road), Trivandrum (Chalai Bazaar), Tuticorin, Udumalpet, Vellore, Virudhunagar, Vizagapatam.

== Imprisonment ==
TN&Q Bank was established in 1937 with a new Quilon headquarters building which Mathen built at a cost of Rs.1,40,000 (a very large sum of money at that time). To retain the business and deposits of the Travancore State, C. P. Mathen and K. C. Mammen Mappillai had not only agreed to the headquarters in Travancore but that two of the bank's directors were the Dewan's appointees and also that the Bank's General Manager, a confidant of the Deiwan named K. S. Ramanujam, was appointed at the specific recommendation of Sir C. P. Ramaswamy Iyer. Despite this initial support from the Travancore Government, within a few months of amalgamation being completed, rumors started making its rounds that the bank was insolvent, and by 1938 there was a run on the bank's assets – this was instigated not only by the Diwan but was publicized by the Travancore State's Department of Publicity. The bank's financial run concluded with 88% of the public's deposits being returned by the bank, and the bank becoming insolvent. At this point the trap was sprung, by Sir CP's administration demanding the extradition of Mathen and Mammen Mappillai from Madras Presidency to Travancore State to stand trial for defrauding the public. Sir CP also convinced the British Government in Madras that the bank and its directors had been financing the Indian National Congress and the Independence movement, so appeals to the Madras High Court and the Privy Council in London to stay the extradition orders were rejected and 3 directors of the bank including Mathen, Mammen Mappillai and Mammen Mappillai's elder brother and Mammen Mappillai's son, were transported in chains from Madras to Quilon (now called Kollam]) to stand trial.

At the trial in Trivandrum, the erstwhile General Manager of the bank - K. S. Ramanujam, who was the nominee of the Maharaja's government - falsely testified that Mammen Mappillai and Mathen had defrauded the bank and four directors (including Mammen Mappillai's brother and son) were then awarded 8 years' imprisonment. The bank's remaining assets were liquidated by the State, and the bank's assets were distributed - mainly to confidants of Sir C. P. Ramaswamy Iyer, one of whom acquired the bank headquarters' building in Quilon for Rs.15,000 - approximately a tenth of what it had cost to build three years earlier.

With the first year in jail, Mammen Mappillai's imprisoned elder brother died a broken man. Soon afterwards, Sir CP, who had been an astute lawyer in the colonial administration, being keenly aware of the weaknesses in the Government's case – which depended on K. S. Ramanujam who vanished abroad after the trial - sent word to Mammen Mappillai and Mathen that if they admitted their accused guilt and sought the Maharaja's mercy they could be pardoned. Mammen Mappillai and his son, had other major family problems, so they agreed to sign the false declaration but Mathen continued to refuse. Sir CP initially declined to agree to the release without all of three of them admitting guilt, but finally released Mammen Mappillai and his son on receiving their written "confessions".

Mathen continued to hold out on his refusal to sign any false confession, despite heavy pressure brought on him through the Inspector General of Police, Abdul Karim, visiting him regularly in jail and suggesting that he sign a letter – which the IG had drafted, requesting the Maharaja to pardon and release him. Finally, on 22 January 1942, C. P. Mathen was unconditionally released by the Maharaja's Government without any written or verbal false admission of guilt. The IG, Abdul Karim, took Mathen in his official car from Travancore jail to his house where his family had waited patiently for his release from jail.

== Political and diplomacy career ==
He was elected to the first Lok Sabha in 1953, from Thiruvalla constituency in the State of Travancore–Cochin (now Kerala) by one of the largest majorities of that election.

After completing his term in the Lok Sabha, in 1957, he was appointed as the Indian Ambassador to Sudan. He retired a year later for health reasons caused by his years of imprisonment in Trivandrum.

== Death ==
Mathen died on 2 June 1960 in Paris, Île-de-France, France and buried at Thiruvalla, Kerala, India.

== General references ==
- N. M. Mathew, History of the Mar Thoma Church (Malayalam), Vol. 3, 2008. page 75
- Chalakuzhy Kudumba Charitram, Thomas Mathew (ed.) 1987.
