= List of journalism schools in Asia =

This is a list of journalism schools in Asia.

== Bangladesh ==
- Department of Mass Communication and Journalism, University of Dhaka
- Mass Communication and Journalism Discipline, University of Khulna
- Department of Mass Communication and Journalism, Jagannath University
- Department of journalism and media studies, Jahangirnagar University
- Department of Communication and Journalism Studies, North Bengal International University, Rajshahi, Bangladesh
- Department of Media and Communication, Independent University, Bangladesh
- Department of Mass Communication and Journalism, University of Rajshahi
- Department of Communication and Journalism, University of Chittagong
- Department of Journalism, Stamford University (Bangladesh)
- Department of Journalism, University of Liberal Arts Bangladesh
- Department of Mass Communication and Journalism, American International University (Bangladesh)
- Department of Journalism and Mass Communication, Daffodil International University
- Department of Mass Communication and Journalism, Begum Rokeya University
- Newport Institute of Technology, Print and Broadcast Journalism
- Department of Journalism and Media Communication, Green University of Bangladesh

== China ==
- School of International Journalism, Shanghai International Studies University
- School of Journalism and Communication, Renmin University of China
- School of Television and Journalism, Communication University of China
- Fudan Journalism School, Fudan University
- School of Journalism and Communication, Wuhan University
- Tsinghua School of Journalism and Communication, Tsinghua University
- Journalism and Information Communication School, Huazhong University of Science and Technology
- College of Literature and Journalism, Sichuan University
- School of Journalism and Communication, Peking University
- School of Journalism and Communication, Jinan University

== Dubai, UAE ==
- ESJ-Orient Emirates School of Journalism
- Faculty of Media & Journalism, Murdoch University

== Japan ==
- Waseda University

== Jordan ==
- JMI-Jordan Media Institute

== Hong Kong ==
- Institute for Journalism and Society, Hong Kong Baptist University
- Department of Journalism, Hong Kong Baptist University
- Department of Journalism and Communication, Chu Hai College
- School of Journalism and Communication, Chinese University of Hong Kong
- School of Communication, Hang Seng University
- Journalism and Media Studies Centre, University of Hong Kong
- Department of Journalism and Communication, Shue Yan University

== India ==
- Jindal School of Journalism and Communication, O.P. Jindal Global University
- Auro University's School of Journalism and Mass Communication, Surat, Gujarat
- Institute of Journalism and Mass Communication
- Center of Media Studies, IPS, University of Allahabad, Uttar Pradesh.
- [School of Journalism and Media Studies, Uttarakhand Open University, Haldwani, Nainital
- Delhi school of journalism, University of Delhi, New Delhi
- Makhanlal Chaturvedi National University of Journalism and Communication, Bhopal, INDIA
- Department of Communication & Journalism, Gauhati University
- Department of Journalism & Communication, University of Madras
- Department of journalism and Mass communication Dev Sanskriti Vishwavidhyalaya- Haridwar
- AJK, Mass Communication Research Centre, Jamia Millia Islamia University, New Delhi
- Apeejay Institute of Mass Communication, New Delhi
- Amity School of Journalism And Communication, New Delhi
- Annapurna International School of Film + Media
- Asian College of Journalism, Chennai
- Department of Journalism and Mass Communication, EFLU, Hyderabad
- Department of Media Studies and Visual Communication, GITAM School of Humanities and Social Sciences, Hyderabad
- Geeturai School of Journalism and Mass Communication, Hyderabad
- Mediamindz Institute of Film and Media, Hyderabad
- Department of Communication and Journalism, Pune University
- NBA School of Mass Communication, New Delhi (National Broadcasting Academy)
- Sri Aurobindo Centre for Arts & Communication, Sri Aurobindo Centre for Arts & Communication
- Seamedu School of Pro-Expressionism, Department of Broadcast Journalism
- Faculty of Media Studies, Manav Rachna International University
- Department of Communication and Journalism, Mumbai University
- Department of Journalism, Delhi College of Arts and Commerce, University of Delhi
- Department of Journalism, Makhanlal Chatuverdi National University of Journalism & Communication
- Department of Journalism & Mass Communication, University of Calcutta
- Department of Mass Communication, Assam University
- Department of Mass Communication, School of Professional Studies, Krishna Kanta Handique State Open University
- Department of Journalism and Mass Communication, North Eastern Hill University, Shillong
- Indian Institute of Mass Communication
- Kushabhau Thakre University of Journalism & Mass Communication
- Manorama School of Communication
- School of Journalism & Mass Communication- Noida International University
- School for Radio and Television Journalism, Bharatiya Vidya Bhavan
- School for Radio and Television Journalism, Mahatma Gandhi Chitrakoot Gramoday University
- School of Mass Communication, Jagran Institute of Management and Mass Communication at Noida
- School of Communication Studies, Panjab University
- Symbiosis Institute of Media and Communication
- Xavier Institute of Communications
- BFIT, Dehradun Hemwati Nandan Bahuguna Garhwal University
- Department of journalism and mass communication - Faculty of Science And Humanities SRM Institute of Science and Technology
- Department of Journalism and Mass Communication, Punjabi University
- Institute of Journalism & Mass Communication, Chhatrapati Shahu Ji Maharaj University, Kanpur
- Indian Institute of Journalism & New Media, Bangalore
- International Institute of Management, Media & IT (IIMMI )
- Trinity Institute of Professional Studies (TIPS), Dwarka
- Heritage Institute of Management & Communication (HIMCOM), New Delhi

== Indonesia ==
- Department of Communication, University of Indonesia
- Department of Public Relations dan Marketing, University Diponergoro
- Faculty of Communication, University of Padjajaran
- Department of Communication, University of Airlangga
- Faculty of Communication, Multimedia Nusantara University
- Department of Communication, University of 17 Agustus 1945 Surabaya
- Faculty of Communication, Widya Mandala Catholic University Surabaya
- Department of Communication Science, FISIPOL, Universitas Gadjah Mada

== Iran ==
- Faculty of Communications, Allameh Tabataba'i University

== Malaysia ==
- Department of Journalism, Universiti Tunku Abdul Rahman
- School of Mass Communication & Media, University Technology MARA
- Faculty of Communication, University of Science, Malaysia

== Myanmar ==
- Yangon Journalism School (YJS)
- Mandalay Journalism School
- Myanmar Journalism Institute (MJI)
- National Management Degree College (BA. Journalism)

== Nepal ==
- Ratna Rajyalaxmi Campus Tribhuvan University
- Kantipur City College (KCC), Purbanchal University
- College of Mass Communication and Journalism (CJMC), Kathmandu Purwanchal University

== Pakistan ==
- Department of Mass media and communication, University of Sindh
- Department of Media and Communication Studies, International Islamic University, Islamabad
- Department of Mass Communication, Bahauddin Zakariya University Multan
- Department of Mass Communication, Lahore College for Women University
- Department of Mass Communication, National University of Modern Languages
- Department of Mass Communication, Quaid-i-Azam University
- Department of Mass Communication, University of Karachi
- Department of Media Studies, Islamia University
- Institute of Communication Studies, University of the Punjab
- School of Media & Mass Communication, Beaconhouse National University
- Department of Media Studies, Kinnaird College for Women, Lahore

== Philippines ==
- Asian Academy of Television Arts
- Asian Institute of Journalism and Communication
- Colegio de San Juan de Letran
- Far Eastern University Institute of Arts and Sciences
- Lyceum of the Philippines University
- The Manila Times College
- Polytechnic University of the Philippines College of Communication
- University of the Philippines College of Mass Communication
- University of Santo Tomas Faculty of Arts and Letters
- University of the East College of Arts and Sciences
- De La Salle University – Dasmariñas Broadcast Journalism

== Singapore ==
- Division of Journalism & Publishing, Wee Kim Wee School of Communication and Information, Nanyang Technological University
- School of Film and Media Studies, Ngee Ann Polytechnic

== South Korea ==
- Graduate School of Journalism, Journalism School Semyung University
- Department of Communication, Seoul National University
- Department of Communications, Pusan National University
- Department of Journalism and Mass Communication, Hankuk University of Foreign Studies
- Department of Media and Communications, Korea University

== Taiwan, ROC ==
- The Graduate Institute of Journalism, National Taiwan University
- Department of Journalism, National Chengchi University
- Department of Journalism, Shih Hsin University
- Department of Journalism and Communication Studies, Fu Jen Catholic University
- Department of Journalism, National Chung Cheng University
- Department of Journalism, Chinese Culture University
- Department of Journalism, Ming Chuan University

== Thailand ==
- Faculty of Communication Arts, Chulalongkorn University
- Faculty of Journalism and Mass Communication, Thammasat University
- Faculty of Mass Communication, Chiang Mai University
- Faculty of Communication Arts, Dhurakijpundit University

== Vietnam ==
- Faculty of International Communication, Diplomatic Academy of Vietnam
- Institute of Journalism, Academy of Journalism and Communication
- School of Journalism and Communication, VNU University of Social Sciences and Humanities
- Faculty of Broadcasting, Academy of Journalism and Communication
- Faculty of Public Relations and Advertisement, Academy of Journalism and Communication
- Faculty of International Affairs, Academy of Journalism and Communication
- Division of Journalism, Faculty of Literature, University of Science and Education - The University of Danang
