= Vanitha =

Indian magazine

- Magazine cover on 28 September 2024 featuring actress Mamitha Baiju
- Chief Editor: Prema Mammen Mathew
- Categories: Women's magazine
- Frequency: Fortnightly
- Circulation: 687,915 (as of December 2013)
- Founded: 1975; 51 years ago
- Company: Malayala Manorama Company Limited
- Country: India
- Based in: Kottayam
- Language: Malayalam
- Website: www.vanitha.in
- OCLC: 416870983

Vanitha (transl. Woman) is an Indian magazine published fortnightly by the Malayala Manorama group. It is the largest magazine in India by circulation according to the Audit Bureau of Circulations, with an average of 687,915 copies sold (as of December 2013). It remained the largest by circulation in 2017 as well.

== History and profile ==
Vanitha was launched in 1975 as a monthly magazine and became a fortnightly in 1987. The magazine was founded by Annamma Mathew, wife of K.M. Mathew, and is known for her contributions to social service, cookery, journalism, and literature. Vanitha is published in Malayalam and introduced a Hindi edition in 1997. Although its name translates to "woman" in Sanskrit, it includes news and views and other articles on a variety of topics, and is not strictly a women's magazine.

Vanitha is owned and published by MM Publications Ltd. in Kottayam. MM Publications Ltd. is part of the Malayala Manorama Group. In addition to being released twice a month, Vanitha also includes special double issues for Onam, Easter, New Year's Day and Christmas.

Between July and December 2000 Vanitha was the best-selling magazine in India with a circulation of 3,82,027 copies. In 2012, the Malayalam edition of the magazine had a readership of over of 2.27 million, making it the highest read magazine in India.

== See also ==
- Malayala Manorama
- Vanitha Miss Kerala
