= Travancore National and Quilon Bank =

Indian bank

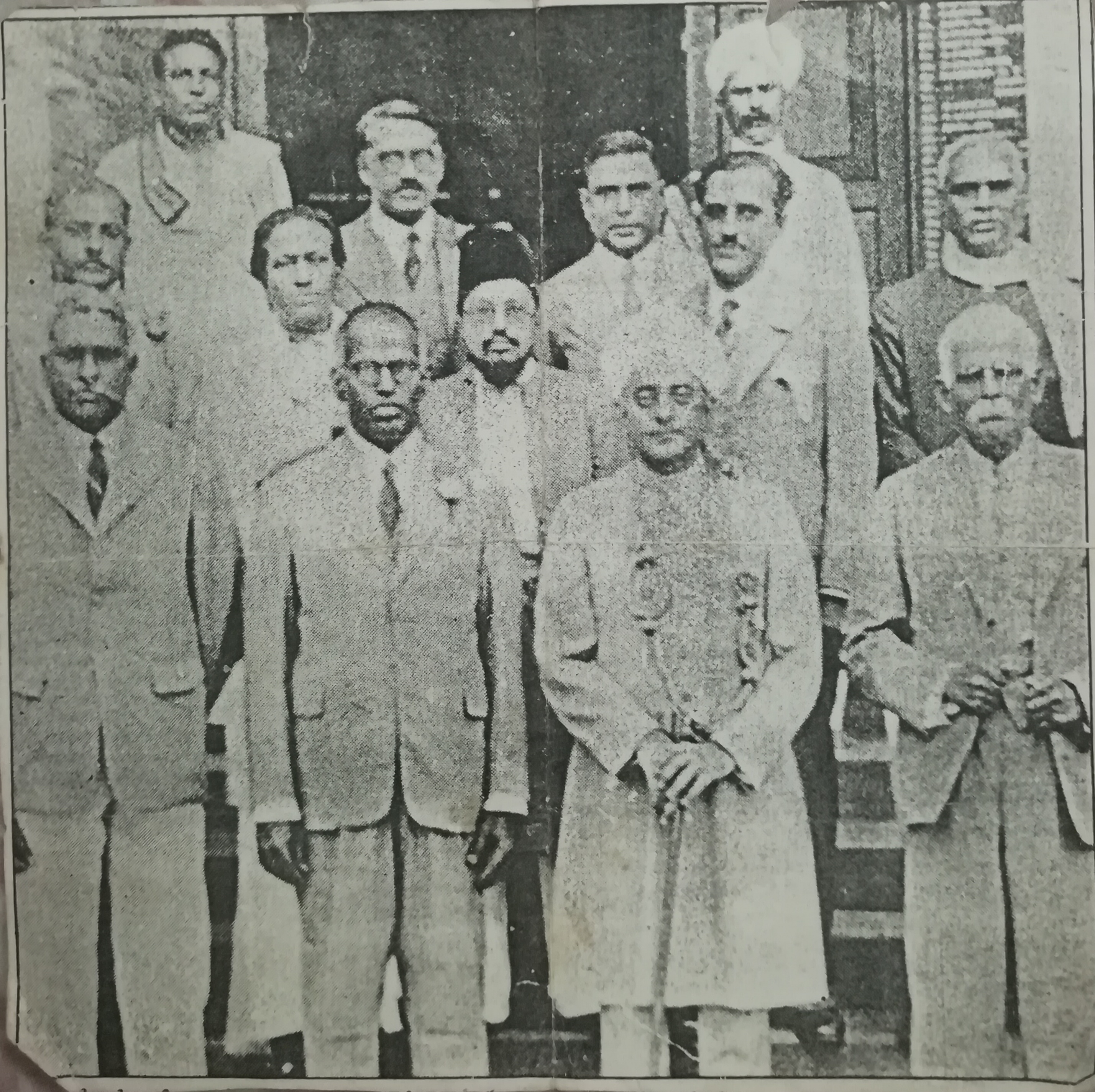
- Type: Private sector
- Industry: Banking, Insurance, Capital Markets and allied industries
- Founded: 1 April 1937; 89 years ago as The Travancore National and Quilon Bank
- Founder: K. C. Mammen Mappillai; C. P. Mathen
- Defunct: 31 March 1938
- Fate: Defunct
- Headquarters: India
- Number of locations: Madras Presidency
- Area served: India
- Key people: K. C. Eapen; K. C. Mammen Mappillai; C. P. Mathen; M. O. Thomas Vakkel Modisseril
- Products: Deposits, Personal Banking Schemes, C & I Banking Schemes, Agri Banking Schemes, SME Banking Schemes
- Services: Banking, Trade Finance

The Travancore National and Quilon Bank, often abbreviated as TN&Q Bank, was a bank which came to being in 1937 in the princely Kingdom of Travancore in modern-day India as a result of merger of two well known banks of the time, Travancore National Bank and Quilon Bank. The bank was closed down in 1938.

== History ==
=== Founding ===
The Travancore National and Quilon Bank was the result of a 1937 merger between Travancore National Bank (founded: 1912) and Quilon Bank (founded: 1919). The merger resulted in TNQB becoming the 4th largest bank in India.

=== Management ===
The bank was owned and managed by two prominent Christian families of Kerala, Chalakuzhy family and Kandathil family with origin from Thiruvalla.

The bank had also managed to become the fourth largest bank in India, after the Imperial Bank of India, the Central Bank of India and the Bank of India.

=== Final Years ===
The Travancore National and Quilon Bank was a successful bank in all aspects. But its unrelenting support to the Indian National Congress (INC) in the struggle for independence resulted in its downfall. The Dewan(Prime Minister)of Travancore,Sir C.P Ramaswamy Iyer got irked because its founders were supporting the Indian National Congress instead of the Ruler of the Kingdom Of Travancore. So, he devised a plan to close down the bank. His plan was successful, and the two founders of the bank, K. C. Mammen Mappillai and Chalakuzhy Paulose Mathen were both falsely implicated and imprisoned by the Dewan, C.P Ramaswamy Iyer and his accomplices.

=== Aftermath ===
The bank was closed down after being accused of financial irregularities. But because this was not the truth, the founders were able to repay its investors before closing down permanently in 1939. The banks founders were released from imprisonment without any charges against them being proven.

=== Historical interpretation ===
The Kochi-Muziris Biennale (2025-26) featured an exhibition titled ‘Lilies in the Garden of Tomorrow’ by artist Sarah Chandy, which examined the bank's history through the correspondence and diaries of Eliamma Matthen, wife of co-founder C.P. Matthen. The installation explored Eliamma's struggle against her husband's imprisonment and its effects on her family and community.

== See also ==
- Indian banking
- List of banks in India
- List of oldest banks in India
- Banking in India
- Reserve Bank of India
- Indian Financial System Code
- List of largest banks
- List of companies of India
