= K. E. Mammen =

Indian activist

- Born: 31 July 1921; Travancore, British India
- Died: 26 July 2017 (aged 95)
- Occupation: Freedom fighter

Kandathil Eapen Mammen (31 July 1921 – 26 July 2017) was an Indian freedom fighter. He was a follower of Mahatma Gandhi as well as K. Kelappan who was often referred to as the Kerala Gandhi.

== Personal life ==
Mammen was born into the Kandathil family on 31 July 1921 as the sixth child of K. C. Eapen and Kunjandamma, in Thiruvananthapuram. His father was a manager of the Travancore National Bank, and they lived opposite the Kerala Government Secretariat where freedom fighters used to converge to make speeches. Mammen was a staunch follower of Gandhian ideals and led an austere life. He remained unmarried.

== Activism ==
He became the president of the Travancore Students Federation while he was an intermediate student at College of Fine Arts Trivandrum. During this period, he was jailed for urging students to join the freedom struggle, during a public meeting held at Thirunakkara. The famous 'Kozhencherry speech' by C. Kesavan inspired Mammen to dedicate himself to social causes. The National Quilon Bank was closed by C. P. Ramaswami Iyer who was the then Diwan of Travancore. Mammen's father, K. C. Eapen - the brother of K. C. Mammen Mappillai, was among the officials arrested and ended up dying in jail. He was expelled from the college for criticising the Diwan in a meeting and was refused admission to Maharaja's College, Ernakulam when he tried to continue his education there. He subsequently completed his intermediate course at St. Thomas College, Thrissur. He went to the Madras Christian College for his bachelor's degree in 1940, but was soon expelled for participating in the Quit India Movement.

During the period Mahatma Gandhi invoked the youth to join the freedom struggle. Mammen was inspired by this, and began working among the people of Thiruvalla and Kottayam. He was the candidate for the newly formed Praja Socialist Party in the 1952 Travancore-Cochin Legislative Assembly election and ended up coming second by 500 votes. He received many accolades over his eventful life including the Ramashramam Award, Lohi Vicharavedi Award and the TKV Foundation Award. Mammen was also actively involved in anti-liquor campaigns across the state of Kerala till his death. He died on 26 July 2017.
