= K. C. Mammen Mappillai =

Indian journalist

Kandathil Cherian Mammen Mappillai (1873 – 31 December 1953) was an Indian journalist who became editor of the Malayalam-language daily Malayala Manorama after the demise of his paternal uncle Kandathil Varghese Mappillai. Besides being a noted journalist, he was an Indian independence activist and served a member of the Sree Moolam Popular Assembly in Travancore. He also went into development of plantations, and was the inspiration behind the various enterprises of his sons.

Due to his support and involvement of the Indian independence movement, he was in conflict with the Diwan of Travancore, Sir C. P. Ramaswamy Iyer, who orchestrated Mammen Mappillai's arrest and jailing for two years, as well as the closure of the Malayala Manorama newspaper.

He was the paternal uncle of K. E Mammen.

Born in 1873, he died aged 80 on 31 December 1953. He married Kunjandamma (Modisseril family) who died in September 1950. He had eight sons and one daughter, who included: K. M. Cherian, K. M. Mathew and K. M. Mammen Mappillai.

The K. C. Mammen Mappillai Award presented to the best student of the Manorama School of Communication was named after him.

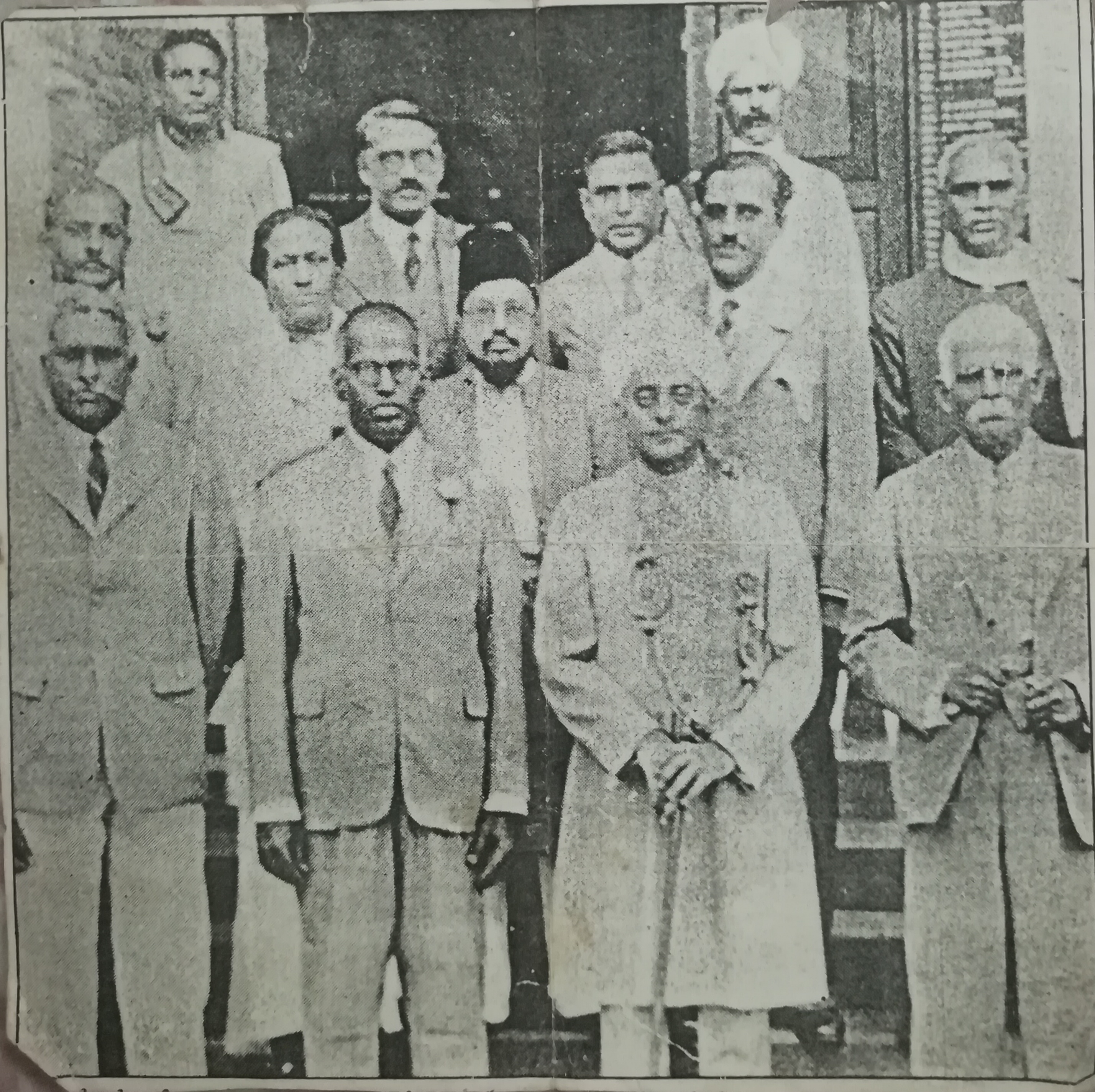
Sir C. P. Ramaswami Iyer with directors of TN&Q Bank which includes C. P. Mathen (managing director), K. C. Mammen Mappillai, M. O. Thomas Vakkel Modisseril (director) and Barrister V. T. Thomas
