= K. M. Cherian (journalist) =

Indian journalist and editor (1897–1973)

- Born: 28 February 1897; Kottayam, Kerala, India
- Died: 15 March 1973 (aged 76); Kottayam
- Resting place: Puthenpally cemetery, Kottayam
- Occupation: Media person
- Years active: 1935–1973
- Spouse: Annamma
- Children: K. C. Mammen, Cherian; Sarasu
- Parent(s): K. C. Mammen Mappillai; Kunjandamma
- Awards: Padma Bhushan; Padma Shri; Chevalier

Kandathil Mammen Cherian (28 February 1897 – 15 March 1973) was an Indian media person and former chief-editor of Malayala Manorama, the Malayalam daily, ranked the first in Malayalam, the fourth in India. and the eleventh in the World, in terms of circulation. He is a recipient of Padma Bhushan and Padma Shri, the third and fourth-highest Indian civilian awards.

== Biography ==
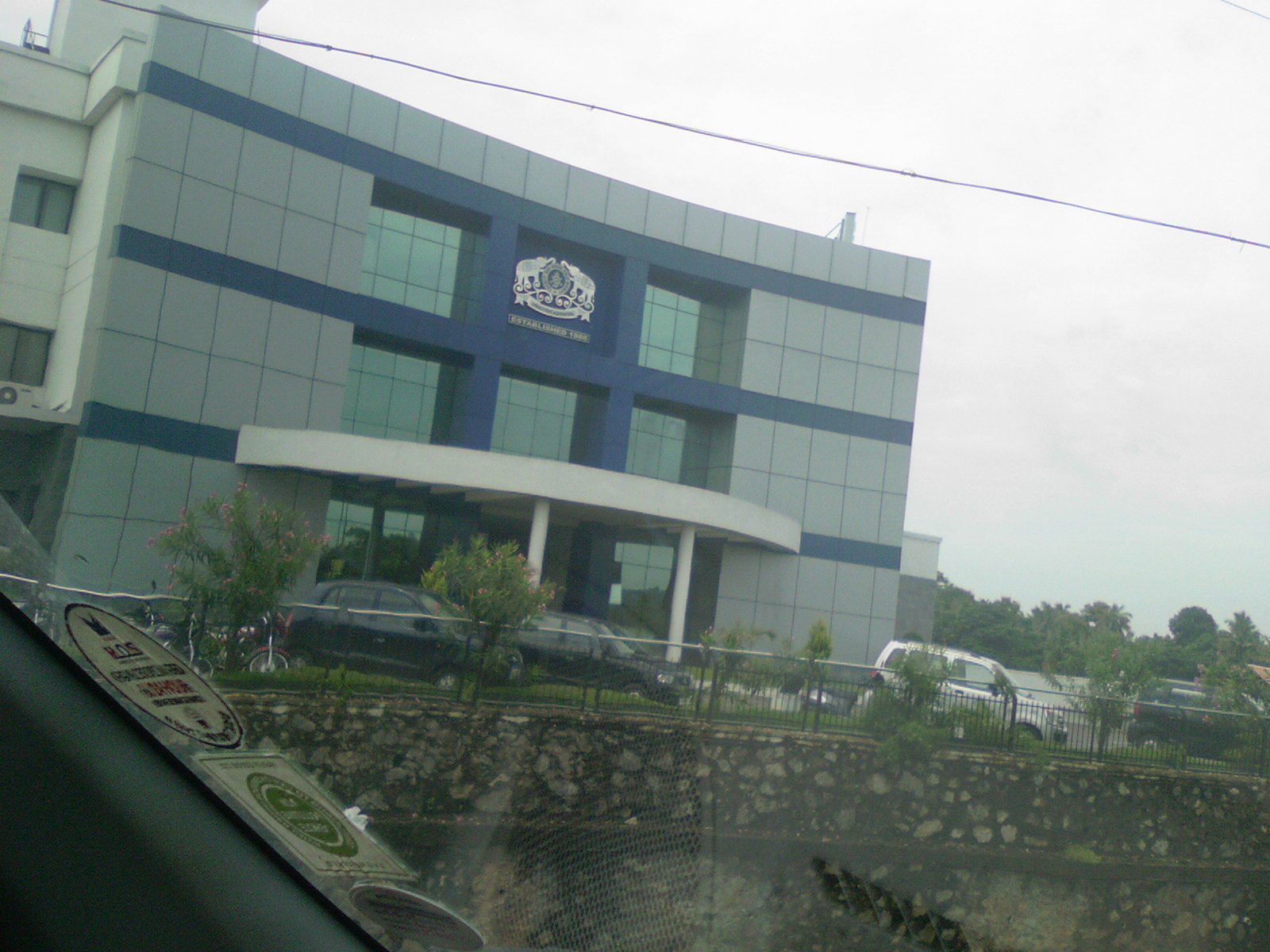
Malayala Manorama office at Pathanamthitta, Kerala

K. M. Cherian was born on 28 February 1897 to K. C. Mammen Mappillai, one of the pioneers of newspaper culture in Kerala, as the eldest of his nine children, at Kottayam in the South Indian state of Kerala. His schooling were at local schools after which he joined Madras Christian College from where he took a master's degree in History to start a teaching career which lasted 15 years. In between, he married Saramma and the family continued to live in Madras. The next move was as the manager of The New Guardian of India Insurance Company, Madras, a venture his father started in 1935.

Soon, Cherian had to return to Kerala when his father, uncle and a brother were arrested following a tiff with the then Travancore Diwan, Sir C. P. Ramaswami Iyer. He joined his family in Kottayam to manage the litigations against the family members and to take care of Malayala Manorama which had by then been proscribed by the government. Cherian is reported to have managed to clear all the family debts incurred during the difficult time, and bought back Malayala Manorama which had by then been put up for auction. Annamma, Cherian's wife, died in 1946.

When Malayala Manorama reopened in 1947, Cherian joined his father as the Managing Director of Manorama and became the Chief Editor in 1953, on the death of his father. During his tenure as the Head of Malayala Manorama, the daily and its sister publications such as Malayala Manorama Weekly and Balarama climbed up in circulation ratings.

Cherian held various organizational positions during his life. He has held the chair of Press Trust of India, Indian and Eastern Newspaper Society and Travancore Forward Bank. he was the president of Kerala Newspaper Proprietors Association, Kottayam Chamber of Commerce, Orthopaedics and Technical Centre in Kottayam and the Milk Supplies Union, Kottayam during various periods. He sat in the boards of three educational institutions such as Union Christian College, Aluva, Mar Athanasious College, Kothamangalam and Balikamadom High School, Thirumoolapuram.

K. M. Cherian died on 15 March 1973, at Kottayam, leaving behind two daughters and a son. He was 76. He was buried with full state honours at Kottayam New Church cemetery. He was succeeded as Chief Editor by his younger brother, K. M. Mathew.

== Awards and recognitions ==
K. M. Cherian, a recipient of the Chevalier title from the Patriarch of Antioch and All the East, was awarded the Padma Shri in 1965 by the Government of India. He again featured in the Republic Day honours list, in 1971, this time for the third highest civilian award of Padma Bhushan.

== See also ==
- K. M. Mathew
- Malayala Manorama
