= Manorama News =

Indian Malayalam-language TV channel

- Logo used since 2025
- Country: India
- Broadcast area: Kerala
- Network: Malayala Manorama Television (MMTV)
- Headquarters: Aroor, Alappuzha, Kerala

Programming
- Language: Malayalam
- Picture format: 576p SDTV

Ownership
- Owner: Malayala Manorama
- Sister channels: Mazhavil Manorama

History
- Launched: 17 August 2006; 20 years ago

Links
- Website: manoramanews.com

Availability

Streaming media
- ManoramaMAX: (India)

Manorama News is an Indian Malayalam language Free-to-air news channel owned by Malayala Manorama, operated by Malayala Manorama Television (MMTV) the channel based at Aroor, Alappuzha, was launched on 17 August 2006.

Johny Lukose is the current News Director of Manorama News. Romy Mathew is the Coordinating Editors of the channel (Heads the Input and Output Functions respectively).

Malayala Manorama Group also operates the Malayalam OTT platform ManoramaMAX.

Manorama News underwent a change in the look and feel on June 09, 2025. Its logo was also redesigned.

== Programming ==
Daily programs Source:

- News
- Pularvela
- Counter Point
- Thiruva Ethirva
- Arogyam

Weekly programs Source:

- Parayathe Vayya
- Nere Chowe (interview)
- Gulf This Week
- Nallapadham
- Nattupacha
- Veedu
