= Academy of Journalism and Communication =

Coordinates: 21.0378°N 105.7885°E

- Học viện Báo chí và Tuyên truyền
- Other name: AJC
- Former names: Central School of Propaganda (1962 - 1969) Central School of Propaganda and Training (1969 - 1983) Central School of Propaganda and Training I (1983 - 1990) School of Propaganda (1990) University of Propaganda (1990 - 1993) Institute of Journalism and Communication (1993 - 2005)
- Type: Public, Central-level
- Established: 16 January 1962
- Academic affiliations: Ho Chi Minh National Academy of Politics
- Chair: Associate Professor Mai Duc Ngoc
- Director: Associate Professor Pham Minh Son
- Location: 36, Xuan Thuy Road, Hanoi, 11300, Vietnam
- Campus: Urban, 58,128 square metres (625,680 sq ft)
- Language: Vietnamese, English
- Website: ajc.hcma.vn

Academy of Journalism and Communication (abbreviated as AJC; Vietnamese: Học viện Báo chí và Tuyên truyền) is a public academy with degree-awarding power within the central level in Hanoi, Vietnam. Established in 1962, AJC is directed by the Ho Chi Minh National Academy of Politics, an academy of the Central Committee of the Communist Party of Vietnam.

== History ==
=== Founding and Expansion (1962 - 2005) ===
Founded on January 16, 1962, by the resolution 36-NQ/TW of Central Committee of the Communist Party of Vietnam, Central School of Propaganda, the founding school of the Academy of Journalism and Communication, was formed by merging two different schools in propaganda and training: Nguyen Ai Quoc School II, School of Propaganda. The Central School of Propaganda then operates under the Central Propaganda Department of the Communist Party of Vietnam, to conduct propaganda training. On October 9, 1969, the Central School of Propaganda change their name to the Central School of Propaganda and Training, this decision was made by the Central Secretariat of the Communist Party of Vietnam follow by a proposal made by the Central Propaganda Department, follow by degree-awarding power, university-level benefits and policies being granted and applied.

On January 2, 1983, follow by a merge with Nguyen Ai Quoc School V, the school changed their name to the Central School of Propaganda and Training I. On March 1, 1990, the Central Committee of the Communist Party of Vietnam submitted a reorganisation of Party-owned school system under central, decision 103-QĐ/TW as a result, changed the Central School of Propaganda and Training I to the School of Propaganda. On November 20, 1990, the Council of Ministers approves the school as a university under the Central Secretariat of the Communist Party of Vietnam, following the rules and regulations for higher education instiuitions set by the Ministry of Education and Training. This approval came with a change of name to the University of Propaganda.

On March 10, 1993, the Politburo of the Communist Party of Vietnam release decision 61-QĐ/TW to degsinate the University of Propaganda as an institute of Ho Chi Minh National Academy of Politics, named the Institute of Journamlism and Communication. On August 2, 2005, the institute changed its name to the Academy of Journalism and Communication under Ho Chi Minh National Academy of Politics.

=== Development as an Academy with University status ===
On October 22, 2008, Prime Minister of Vietnam issued Decision 1537/QĐ-TTg, giving the academy postgraduate degree-awarding power, including both taught and research power, as an independent instituition under the Ho Chi Minh National Academy of Politics. The academy is one of the few instituitions that were included in the specialised public higher education development strategy announced by the PM under Dispatch 910/TTg-KGVX.

== Campus and Facilities ==
The Academy of Journalism and Communications possessed an urban main campus in Cau Giay Ward, Hanoi, Vietnam with a total land area of 58,128 square meters, equipped with office rooms, lecture theaters, experimental labs, classrooms, library and an dedicated dormitory. The academy's library is open for the public, hosting various books, titles, and articles specialised in journmalism, communications, philosophy, politics, and propaganda materials.

== Academic profile ==
The academy is divided into multiple faculties and institutes, each in charge of delivery, assessment, research, and quality controls of the academy's current programmes.

- Faculty of Philosophy: Founded on January 16, 1962, as a result of merging the Faculties of Philosophy, Nguyen Ai Quoc School II and the School of Propaganda, the Faculty of Philosophy now conduct delivery of the academy's undergraduate (full-time and part-time), postgraduate (taught and research) in Marxism–Leninism.
- Faculty of Political Economy: Founded on January 16, 1962, as a result of merging the Faculties of Political Economy, Nguyen Ai Quoc School II and the School of Propaganda, the Faculty of Philosophy now conduct delivery of the academy's undergraduate and postgraduate programmes in political economy, economics and management.
- Faculty of Scientific Socialism: Founded on January 16, 1962, the Faculty of Scientific Socialism conduct delivery of the academy's undergraduate, postgraduate and short courses in scientific socialism with specialisation in the Vietnamese system. The faculty additionally conduct training for Laos.
- Faculty of Party's History: Founded on January 16, 1962, the Faculty of Party's History conduct delivery of the academy's undergraduate and postgraduate (taught and research) programmes in the history of the Communist Party of Vietnam.
- Faculty of Ho Chi Minh's Ideology: Founded on May, 2000, the Faculty of Ho Chi Minh's Ideology focused on the delivery of the academy's undergraduate and postgraduate (taught and research) programmes in Ho Chi Minh Thought.
- Faculty of Party Development: Founded on 1975, the Faculty of Party Development focused on the delivery of the academy's undergraduate and postgraduate (taught and research) programmes in development of the Communist Party of Vietnam.
- Faculty of Communication: Founded on January 16, 1962, the Faculty of Communication focused on the delivery of the academy's undergraduate and postgraduate (taught and research) programmes in communication of policies and policies development.
- Faculty of Political Science: Founded on September 1, 1994, the Faculty of Political Science focused on the delivery of the academy's undergraduate and postgraduate (taught and research) programmes in political science, political development, and public administration.
- Faculty of International Affairs: Founded on 1994, the Faculty of International Affairs focused on the delivery of the academy's undergraduate and postgraduate (taught) programmes in international relations, international communication, and political relations.
- Faculty of State and Law: Founded on 1983, the Faculty of State and Law focused on the delivery of the academy's undergraduate and postgraduate (taught) programmes in state management and community management.
- Faculty of Sociology and Development: Founded on August 20, 1994, the Faculty of Sociology and Development focused on the delivery of the academy's undergraduate programmes in sociology and social work.
- Institute of Journalism and Communication: Founded on January 16, 1962, the Institute of Journalism and Communication conduct delivery of the academy's undergraduate, postgraduate (taught and research) programmes in journalism, television and radio.
- Faculty of Publishing: Founded on May, 1967, the Faculty of Publishing focused on the delivery of the academy's undergraduate and postgraduate (taught and research) programmes in publishing management and editing.
- Faculty of Public Relations and Advertising: Founded in May 2006, the Faculty of Public Relations and Advertising conduct delivery of the academy's undergraduate, postgraduate (taught) programmes in public relations, advertising and branding. This includes a transnational education, franchised programmes with Middlesex University, the United Kingdom, being delivered onsite while using partner's materials, assessments and is under their quality control, students receives their award from Middlesex University upon completion of this programmes.
- Faculty of General Education and Pedagogy: Founded on November 1, 2018, the Faculty of General Education and Pedagogy conduct delivery of the academy's undergraduate, postgraduate (taught and research) programmes in general education, education psychology and pedagogy.
- Faculty of Foreign Languages: Founded on March 6, 2006, the Faculty of Foreign Languages conduct delivery of the academy's undergraduate, postgraduate (taught and research) programmes in the English language, transcribing and interpreting in English or non-specialised languages.
