= Malayala Manorama =

Kerala-based Indian newspaper

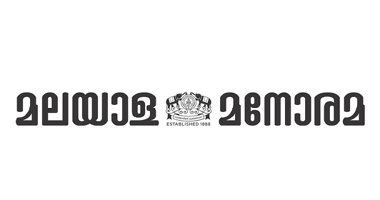
- Logo used since 2006

- Front page of the newspaper
- Type: Daily newspaper
- Format: Broadsheet
- Owner: Malayala Manorama Company Ltd
- Founder: Kandathil Varghese Mappillai
- Editor-in-chief: Mammen Mathew
- Editor: Philip Mathew
- Managing editor: Jacob Mathew
- Founded: 14 March 1888; 138 years ago
- Ceased publication: 1938; 88 years ago
- Relaunched: 1947; 79 years ago
- Language: Malayalam
- Headquarters: Kottayam, Kerala, India
- Circulation: 1,816,081 Daily (as of Jan - Dec 2023)
- Readership: 8.47 million (IRS 2019)
- ISSN: 0972-0022
- OCLC number: 802436310
- Website: epaper.manoramaonline.com

Malayala Manorama is a morning newspaper in Malayalam published from Kottayam, Kerala, India by the Malayala Manorama Company Limited. Currently headed by Mammen Mathew, it was first published as a weekly on 14 March 1888, and currently has a readership of over 8 million (with a circulation base of over 1.9 million copies). It is also the second-oldest Malayalam newspaper in Kerala in circulation, after Deepika, which is also published from Kottayam. Manorama also publishes an online edition.

According to World Association of Newspapers, as of 2016, it was the fourteenth most circulated newspaper in the world. According to the Audit Bureau of Circulations 2022 figures, it is the 2nd largest circulating newspaper in India (behind Dainik Jagran) and the largest circulating newspaper in Kerala.

== History ==
=== Beginnings in Kottayam ===
Malayala Manorama Company is a private LLC corporation, owned by the Kandathil family, an aristocratic Malankara Orthodox Syrian Christian family, incorporated by Kandathil Varghese Mappillai at Kottayam in south-western Kerala on 14 March 1888. The company started with one hundred shares of ₹100 each. The investors paid in four equal instalments. With the first instalment, the company brought a London-made Hopkinson and Cope press. A local craftsman, Konthi Achari, was hired to make Malayalam types for the imported press.

Varghese Mappillai had worked for a year as editor of Kerala Mitram, a Malayalam newspaper run by Gujarati businessman Devji Bhimji, in Cochin and he took over the same position for Manorama. The Maharajah of Travancore Moolam Thirunal approved the logo of the newspaper which was a slight modification of the Travancore Coat of Arms.

The first issue was published on 22 March 1890 from Orthodox Theological Seminary, Kottayam, while the town was hosting a popular cattle fair. It was a four-page weekly newspaper, published on Saturdays. The weekly newspaper became a bi-weekly in 1901, a tri-weekly on 2 July 1918 and a daily on 2 July 1928. After Varghese Mappillai's death in 1904, his nephew K. C. Mammen Mappillai took over as editor.

In 1938, Travancore state proscribed Malayala Manorama on charges of publishing news against the Diwan; Mammen Mappillai was convicted and imprisoned. Malayala Manorama re-commenced regular publication in 1947 after the Indian independence and the Diwan's downfall.

On Mammen Mappillai's death, his eldest son K. M. Cheriyan took over as the Editor-in-Chief in 1954. At this time, Malayala Manorama was produced in a single edition in Kottayam with a circulation of 28,666 copies.

By the late 1950s, Manorama steadily increased circulation and overtook in circulation Mathrubhumi, the dominant Malayalam daily at the time.

=== Expansion across Kerala (1960s) ===
The struggle between Malayala Manorama (based in Kottayam) and Mathrubhumi (based in Kozhikode) demonstrated the forces that would drive the expansion of Indian regional newspapers. The contest also illustrated the difficulties if expansion had to rely on Gutenberg-style printing as with the case of Manorama.

Comparison of circulation Malayala Manorama and Mathrubhumi (from India's Newspaper Revolution (2000) by Robin Jeffrey, Western Influence on Malayalam Language and Literature (1972) by K. M. George and Audit Bureau of Circulations (ABC) 2013)

- Mathrubhumi
- Manorama

In 1962, Mathrubhumi launched its second edition in Kochi. The new edition sent Mathrubumi to a circulation of 170,000 copies by 1964, 19,000 more than its rival, Malayala Manorama. With Mathrubhoomi's circulation rising, it became a compulsion for Manorama to expand its reach, and consequently, introduce new technology. The competition set off a keen struggle for more readers, faster equipment and national advertising from major consumer goods companies [such as Hindustan Unilever]. Manorama launched its printing centre at Kozhikode, Malabar in 1966 with a cast-off press from the paper's base at Kottayam and hand-composed type. But in the run-up to that event, it had installed an offset press at Kottayam and established a teleprinter line with New Delhi in 1965.

By 1970, it was the leading daily in Kerala. The circulation of the newspaper rose from around 30,000 to 300,000 by this expansion across the Malabar Coast.

=== 1980s ===
K. M. Mathew, who took charge as editor in 1973, began a series of renovations, just as the Anandabazar Patrika did in Bengal. He brought in a series of consultants in the management [1979], technical and editorial areas, and accepted their guidance. He conducted frequent training sessions for Manorama journalists and other employees. The company restructured their organisation in 1980. K. M. Mathew said that the decision stemmed from the realisation that the daily had either to become "fully professional" or "risk decline". Mathew sent his best journalists and managers to training schools around the world and imported the most effective techniques in international journalism and newspaper production, which brought a contemporary look and feel to Malayala Manorama. In 1979, a new printing centre was launched at Kochi and in 1987, the Thiruvananthapuram edition was also launched. By 1998, the circulation of Malayala Manorama was increased to 1 million. In the mid-2000s, the daily started units in the Middle East, focusing on the large Malayali population in the region. Mathew is credited with the introduction of the concept of "editionalising" with a larger share of local news and reader-friendly packaging through professional page designing in Manorama, which in turn impacted the entire newspaper industry in Kerala. By 2007, Manorama become the only non-English and non-Hindi daily newspaper in India to cross 1.5 million copies in circulation.

K. M. Mathew was succeeded by his son Mammen Mathew in 2010. In their obituary The Hindu praised Mathew as,

"In what could only be described as a rarity then in Indian language journalism, Mathew showed an unusual commitment to modernisation and professionalism and became a role model for the newspaper industry, which in the early 1980s was at the critical juncture of embarking on a phase of unbelievable expansion."

According to the Audit Bureau of Circulations's (ABC) January–June 2013 figures, Malayala Manorama holds a circulation of 2.1 million readers.

=== 1990s ===
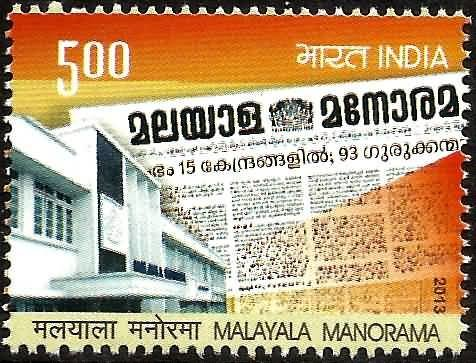
Stamp of India 2013 125 th Anniversary of Malayala Manorama

Malayala Manorama launched its official Malayalam language news website called Manorama Online in 1995. After three years, in 1998, Malayala Manorama launched its English News Website Onmanorama.

== Controversies ==
=== ISRO espionage case ===
Mangalam Publications, Mathrubhumi, Malayala Manorama were among the media houses that were blamed for the coverage of the ISRO Spy case against Indian scientist Nambi Narayanan. In 2018, the Supreme Court of India absolved Dr Nambi Narayanan and said the arrest of Dr Nambi over the 1994 espionage case was needless, and it also granted him ₹ 50 lakh compensation. "Mangalam, picked up the story and began connecting the arrested woman with various businessmen and scientists. This strategy proved successful for Mangalam in terms of creating buzz around a (non-existent) story. Soon, other news houses, such as Malayala Manorama and then Mathrubhumi, also picked it up," writer and veteran journalist Paul Zacharia told TNM.

== Chief editors ==
- Kandathil Varghese Mappillai (1890 - 1904)
- K. C. Mammen Mappillai (1904 - 1938, 1947 - 1954)
- K. M. Cherian (1954 - 1973)
- K. M. Mathew (1973 - 2010)
- Mammen Mathew (2010–present)

== Printing centres ==
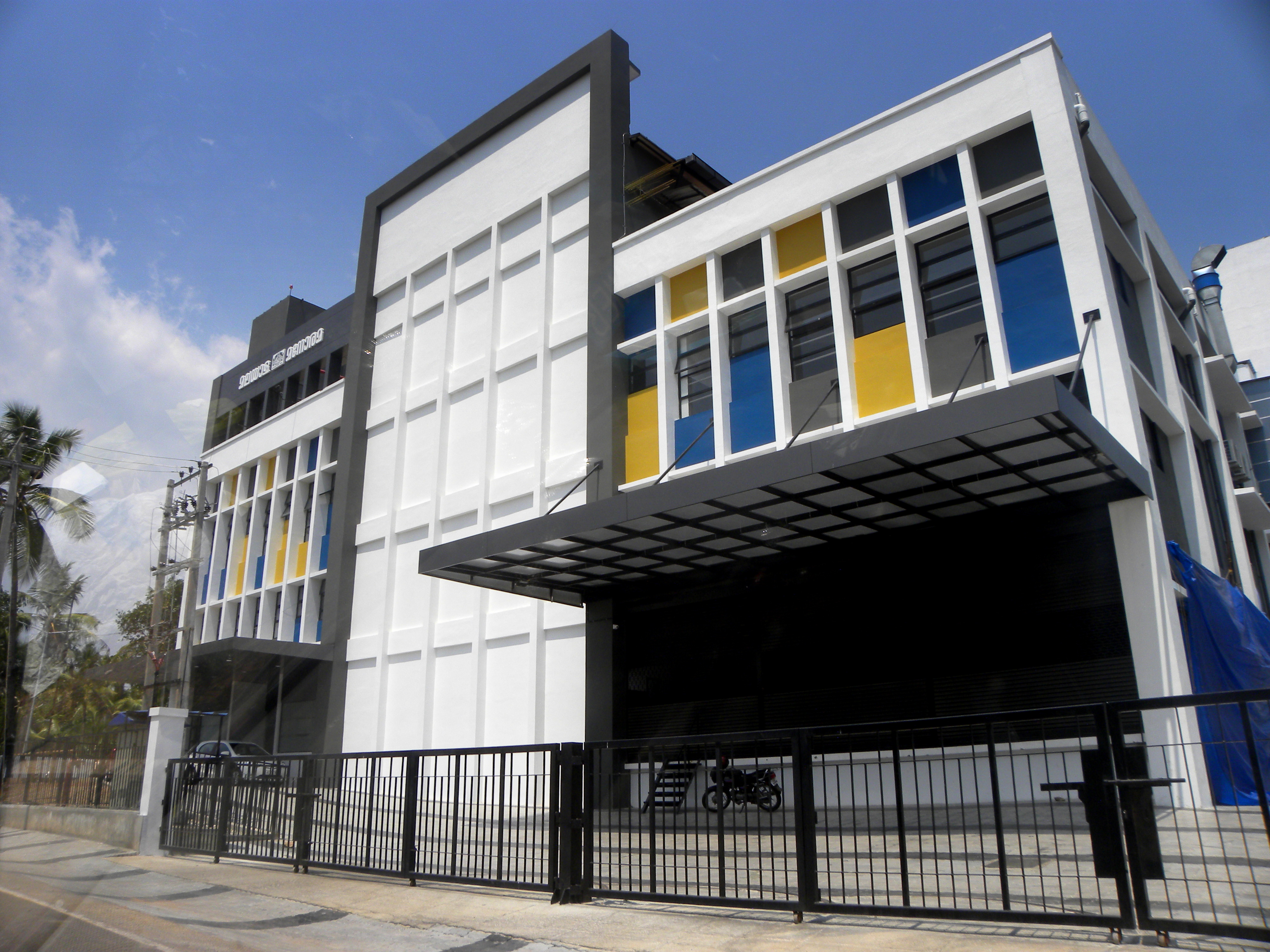
Malayala Manorama office and Press in Kollam city

- Kottayam, Kozhikode, Thiruvananthapuram, Kochi, Thrissur, Kannur, Kollam, Palakkad, Malappuram, Pathanamthitta, Alappuzha, Mangalore, Bangalore, Chennai, Mumbai, Delhi, Dubai, Manama and Doha

== Subsidiaries ==
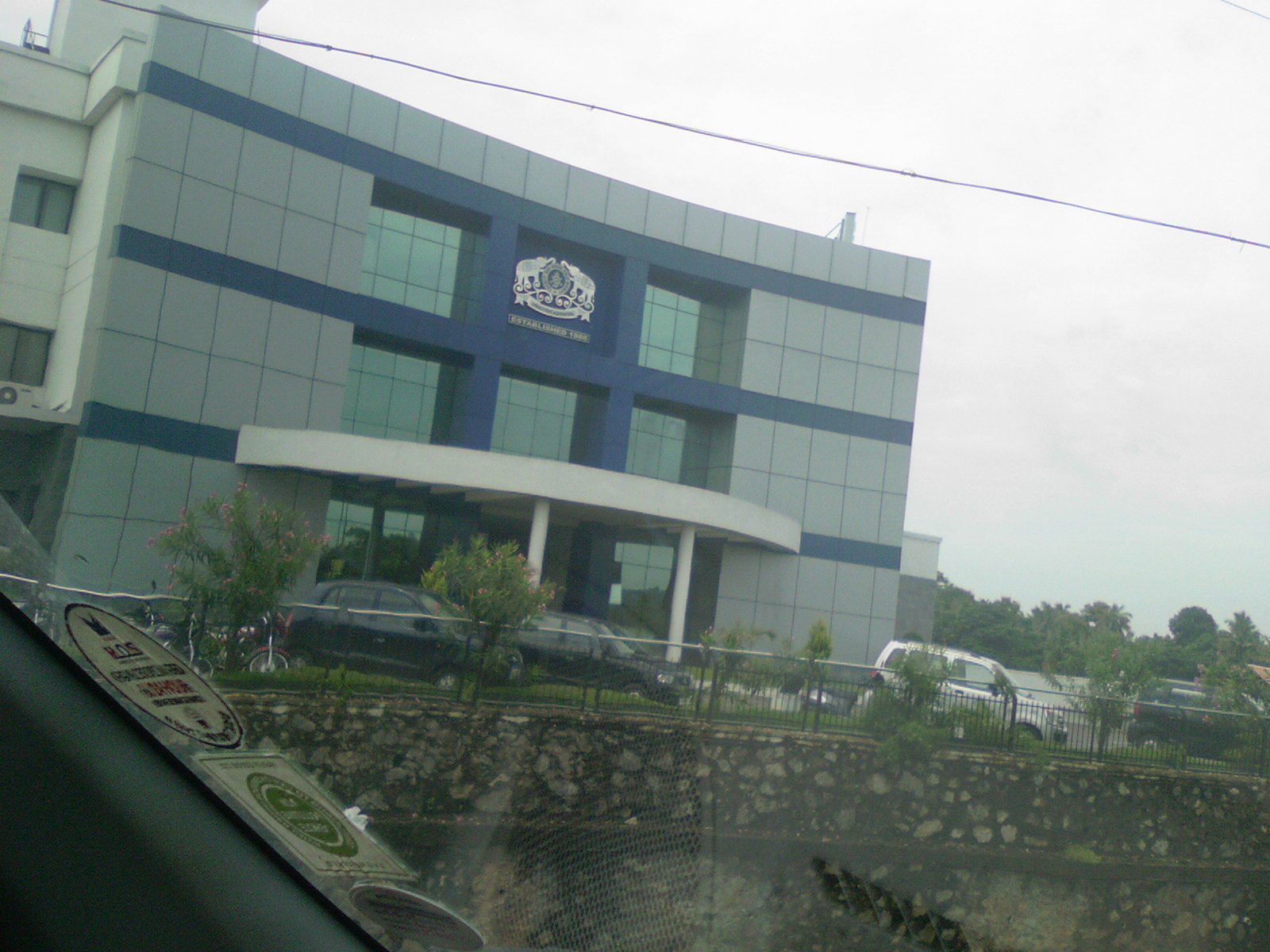
Office of Malayala Manorama at Pathanamthitta, Kerala

Name	Frequency	Language	Type
Arogyam	Monthly	Malayalam	Health Magazine
Balarama	Weekly	Malayalam	Children's Magazine
Balarama Amar Chitra Katha	Fortnightly	Malayalam	Comics
Balarama Digest	Weekly	Malayalam	Children's Magazine
Bhashaposhini	Monthly	Malayalam	Literary Review Magazine
Kalikkudukka	Weekly	Malayalam	Children's Magazine
Karshakasree	Monthly	Malayalam	Agriculture and Gardening Magazine
FastTrack	Monthly	Malayalam	Automobile Magazine
Magic Pot	Weekly	English	Children's Magazine
The Man	Monthly	English	Men's Lifestyle Magazine
Manorama Weekly	Weekly	Malayalam	General Interest Magazine
Sampadhyam	Monthly	Malayalam	Personal Finance and Investment Magazine
Smart Life	Monthly	English	Lifestyle and Health Magazine
Tell Me Why	Monthly	English	Children's Magazine
Thozhil Veedhi	Weekly	Malayalam	Career Guidance Magazine
Livingetc	Monthly	English	Interior Design Magazine
Manorama Traveller	Monthly	Malayalam	Travel Magazine
Vanitha (Hindi)	Fortnightly	Hindi	Women's Magazine
Vanitha	Fortnightly	Malayalam	Women's Magazine
Vanitha Pachakam	Monthly	Malayalam	Food Magazine
Veedu	Monthly	Malayalam	Architecture and Interior Design Magazine
National Geographic Kids India	Monthly	English	Children's Magazine
Watch Time India	Monthly	English	Luxury Watches and Trends Magazine
The Week	Weekly	English	News Magazine
ManoramaMAX	OTT Platform	Malayalam	News, Shows, and Movies
Manorama News	Television Channel	Malayalam	News and Current Affairs
Mazhavil Manorama	Television Channel	Malayalam	Entertainment
Radio Mango 91.9	Radio Station	Malayalam	Music and Entertainment
Onmanorama	News Portal	English	News and General Interest
Manorama Online	News Portal	Malayalam	News and General Interest

== See also ==
- Manorama News
- Onmanorama
- Mazhavil Manorama
- Radio Mango
- Kerala Kaumudi
- Mathrubhumi
- Madhyamam
- Asianet News
- List of newspapers in India by circulation
