= Mammen Mathew =

Chief Editor and Managing Director of Malayala Manorama

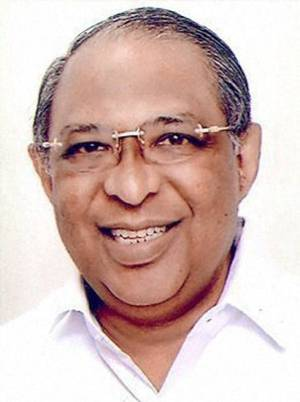
Mammen Mathew Mammen Mathew

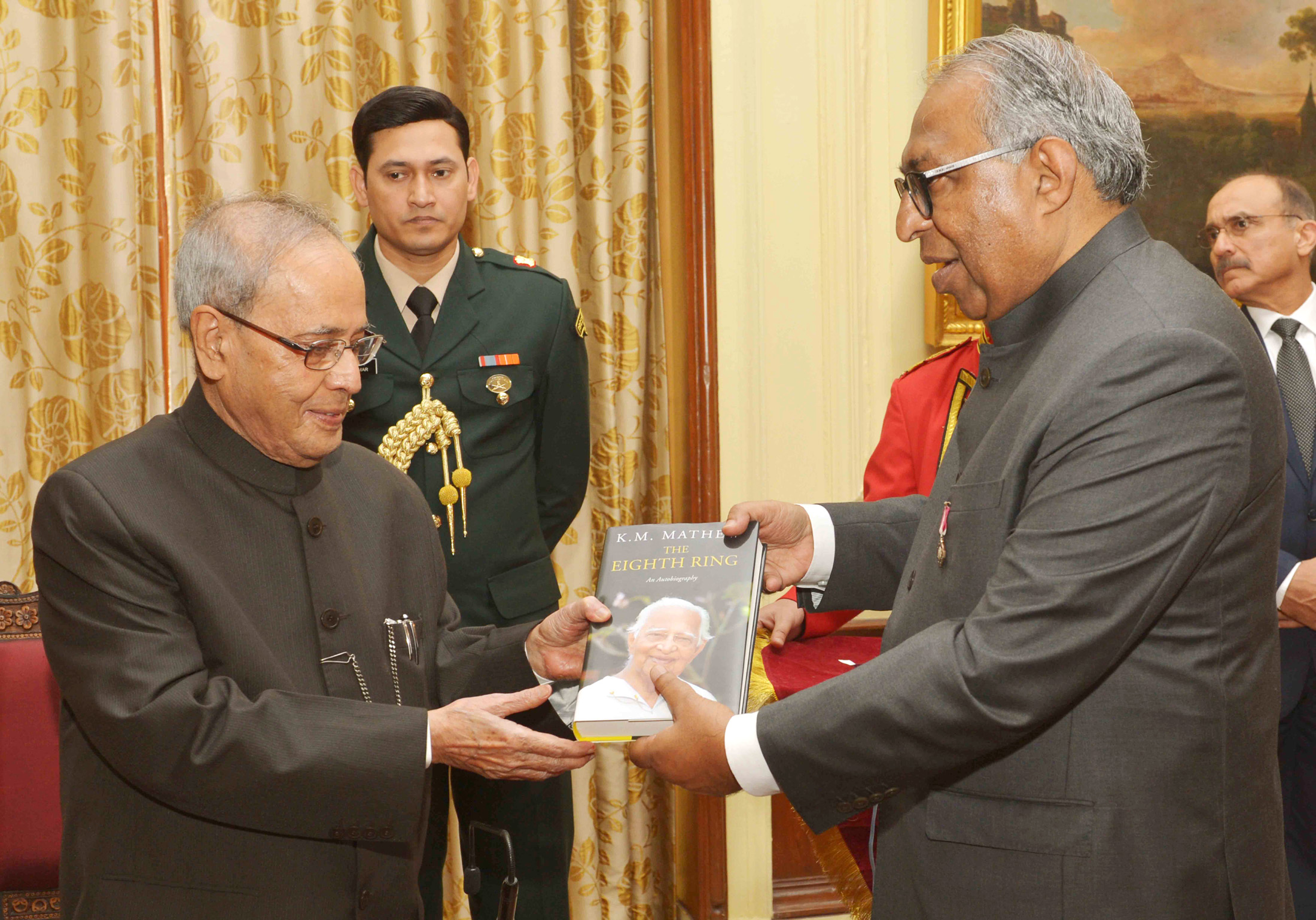
- The President of India, Pranab Mukherjee (left) receiving the first copy of the book The Eighth Ring from Mammen Mathew, at Rashtrapati Bhavan, New Delhi on 26 November 2015
- Born: 20 September 1944 (age 82)
- Occupations: Newspaper editor, journalist
- Known for: Padma Shri (2005)

Mammen Mathew (born 20 September 1944) is the current Chief Editor and Managing Director of the Malayalam-language daily Malayala Manorama. He is the eldest son of the late K. M. Mathew, who was the Chief Editor of Malayala Manorama until 1 August 2010. Mammen has more than 45 years of experience in the field of publication.

== Career ==
Mammen completed his BA and MA in Medieval Indian History from St. Stephen's College in Delhi, and then worked as a trainee in editing at The Times of India. Subsequently, he joined Malayala Manorama as its Delhi correspondent. In 1968, he became a reporter for the Western Mail (Wales) in Cardiff in the United Kingdom. He also worked at The Sunday Times in London, under Harold Evans. Mammen joined the Oklahoma City Times, and later worked for The Daily Oklahoma as reporter in 1969. In 2010, he succeeded his father, K. M. Mathew, as Chief Editor of Malayala Manorama.

== Awards ==
- 2005 — Padma Shri in the field of Literature & Education, awarded by the Government of India.
- 2014 — Lokmanya Tilak National Award for Excellence in Journalism, instituted by Kesari-Mahratta Trust.
