= Audit Bureau of Circulations (India) =

Non-profit circulation-audit organisation

- Type: Private
- Founded: 1948
- Headquarters: Mumbai, Maharashtra, India
- Key people: Karunesh Bajaj (Chairman); Mohit Jain (Deputy Chairman)
- Website: www.auditbureau.org

The Audit Bureau of Circulations (ABC) of India is a non-profit circulation-audit organisation. It certifies and audits the circulations of major publications, including newspapers and magazines in India.

ABC is a voluntary organisation initiated in 1948 that operates in different parts of the world. Until 1948, the concept of circulation audit was yet to be made in India and the publishers had no means to verify the actual circulation number of publications that they used for advertising and had to depend more on their own judgement. Publishers also found it difficult to convince advertisers of the relative values of their publication for the purpose of advertising. It is with this background that eminent representatives of the advertising profession and publishing industry came together to establish an organisation which could serve the common interest. Since then, the benefit of ABC certificates of circulation have been availed by advertisers, advertising agencies, publishers and organisations connected with print media advertising.

== History ==
ABC (India) was founded in 1948, India.

== Qualifications ==
The Publisher should be a Member of The Indian Newspaper Society (INS) and the Publications should be registered with Registrar of Newspapers for India (RNI).

Publisher members must maintain essential books and records to facilitate a proper ABC audit and also appoint an independent firm of Chartered Accountants from amongst the approved panel of auditors named by ABC. Admission of publishers to ABC membership is subject to a satisfactory admission audit. ABC has a system of recheck audit and surprise check audits of publications to be carried out as and when ABC deems appropriate.

The Bureau certifies audited Net Paid circulation figures of publications enrolled with it for a continuous and definite six-monthly audit periods and supplies copies of the ABC Certificates issued for such publications to each member. Free distribution and bulk sales are also shown on the certificates provided the relevant records are adequately maintained. Such records are checked and facts and figures are scrutinised by impartial Auditors, and only then is the Certificate of Net Paid Circulation issued.

== See also ==
- Newspaper circulation
- Magazine circulation
- International Federation of Audit Bureaux of Circulations
- Audit Bureau of Circulations (UK)
- Audit Bureau of Circulations (North America)
- OJD Morocco
