= K. M. Mathew =

Newspaper editor

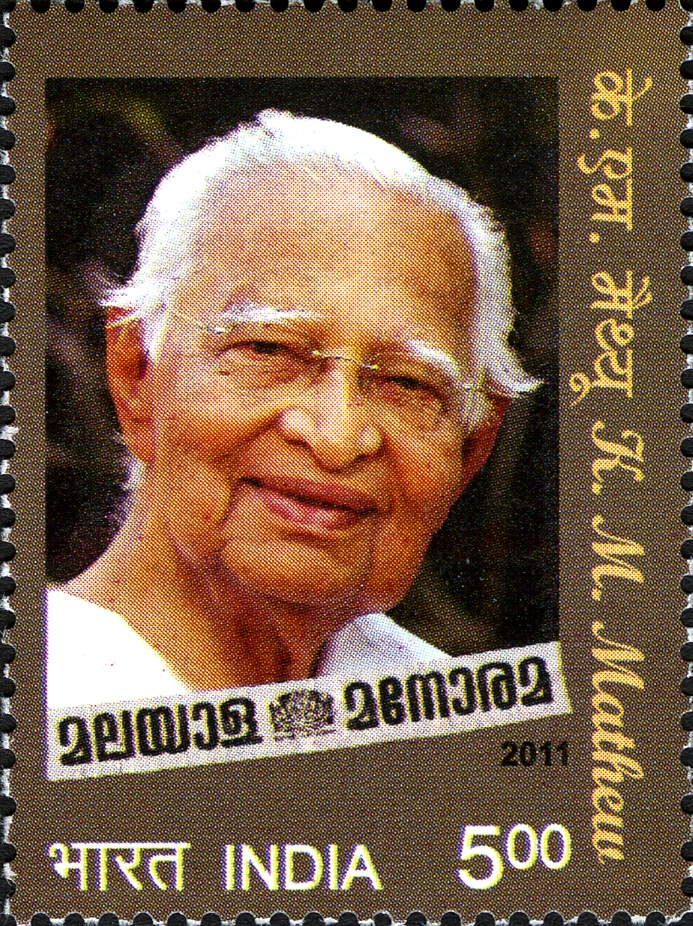
- K. M. Mathew
- Born: 2 January 1917; Alappuzha, Kingdom of Travancore
- Died: 1 August 2010 (aged 93); Kottayam, Kerala, India
- Known for: Chief Editor – Malayala Manorama
- Spouse: Annamma Mathew (m. 1942; died 2003)

Kandathil Mammen Mathew (2 January 1917 – 1 August 2010) was an Indian newspaper editor who served as the editor-in-chief of the Malayalam-language daily, Malayala Manorama.

He also served as a Working Committee Member and Managing Committee Member of the Malankara Orthodox Syrian Church.

== Awards ==
In 1998, Mathew was awarded the Padma Bhushan. He received many other awards including Foundation of Freedom of Information Award (1991), National Citizen's award (1992), Ramakrishna Jay Dayal award (1995), Durga Prasad Chaudhary award (1996), Press Academy Award (1997) and B D Goenka Award (1996).

On his first death anniversary, India Post issued a commemorative postage stamp. At the Parliament House, Prime Minister Dr Manmohan Singh received an album containing the stamp from Kapil Sibal, Union minister for communications and information technology. The five-rupee stamp had a print run of 300,000. The stamp, first day cover and cancellation were designed by Nenu Gupta.

== Family ==
His wife, Annamma Mathew, was a culinary expert and Chief Editor of Vanitha, who wrote under the name Mrs. K. M. Mathew. His book of memoirs, Annamma, (based on his wife), was published by Penguin in Malayalam (2004) and in English (2005). The couple had four children - three sons and a daughter, and nine grandchildren. Annamma Mathew died in 2003, a loss which deeply affected Mathew and led to the formation of his memoirs.

Despite suffering from various illnesses like diabetes and cardiovascular disease, Mathew remained active in many fields, and handled Malayala Manorama till his last days. He died suddenly due to a heart attack on 1 August 2010, aged 93. He was a devout member of the Malankara Orthodox Syrian Church and was buried at the Puthenpally Church Cemetery which is the main cemetery of Kottayam Cheriapally (Saint Mary Orthodox Church) along with its three chapels and kurishupally.

== Autobiography ==
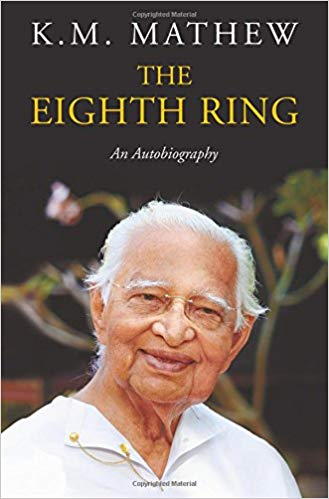
"The Eighth Ring", autobiography of K. M. Mathew

His autobiography titled Ettamathe Mothiram (The Eighth Ring) was published in 2008.
