= List of diplomatic visits to India =

This is a list of heads of state, heads of government, ministers and senior officials who have visited India.

== 1947–2005 ==
1947–2025 list
Name	Title	Country	Date	Visit Type	Reference
Ariel Sharon	Prime Minister	Israel	9 September 2003	First Israeli prime minister to visit India, agreements and memorandums of understanding on defence, information technology and agriculture	
Ismail Omar Guelleh	President	Djibouti	May 2003	State Visit	
Sellapan Ramanathan	President	Singapore	Jan 2003		
John Howard	Prime Minister	Australia	Jul 2000		
Bill Clinton	President	United States	Mar 2000		
Abdurrahman Wahid	President	Indonesia	8 February 2000		
Goh Chok Tong	Prime Minister	Singapore	17 January 2000		
Surendra Prasad Chowdhury	Minister of State for Science & Technology of Nepal	Nepal	17 November 1999		
Arthit Qurairat	Minister of Science, Technology and Environment	Thailand	15 November 1999		
Mohammed Idris Ali	Defence Secretary	Bangladesh	12 October 1999		
Orlando Mercado	Defence Secretary (Minister)	Philippines	11 October 1999		
Humayun Rasheed Choudhury	Speaker of the Bangladesh Parliament	Bangladesh			
Seine Saphantong	Minister of Agriculture and Forestry	Laos	23 May 1999		
Tofail Ahmed	Minister for Commerce and Industries	Bangladesh	19 May 1999		
Ahmed Abdullah	Minister of Health	Maldives	22 April 1999		
Samy Vellu	Minister for works	Malaysia	19 April 1999		
Abdur Razzaq	Minister for Water Resources	Bangladesh	Apr 1999		––>
Queen Elizabeth II	Queen	United Kingdom	12–18 Oct 1997		
Fidel V. Ramos	President	Philippines	2–5 March 1997		
Ezer Weizman	President	Israel	31 Dec 1996–		
Dipendra of Nepal	prince	Kenya	1994		
Daniel arap Moi	President	Kenya	1993		
Girija Prasad Koirala	Prime Minister	Nepal	Dec 1990	New separate trade and transit treaties and other economic agreements India–Nepal relations#1990s	
Mir–Hossein Mousavi	Prime Minister	Iran	Dec 1985		
Queen Elizabeth II	Queen	United Kingdom	17–26 Nov 1983	7th Commonwealth Heads of Government Meeting	
Luís Cabral	President	Guinea-Bissau	1979		
Saddam Hussein	President	Iraq	1979		
William Tolbert	President	Liberia	1978		
Jimmy Carter	President	United States	1 January 1978		
Richard Nixon	President	United States	1 August 1969		
Levi Eshkol	Prime Minister	Israel	21–30 Jan 1968		
Jomo Kenyatta	President	Kenya	21–28 Jan 1965		
Abdullah Al–Salim Al–Sabah	Emir	Kuwait	1963		
Muhammad Najib ar–Ruba'i	President	Iraq	1962		
William Tubman	President	Liberia	1961		
Queen Elizabeth II	Queen	United Kingdom	21 Jan – 1 Feb, 16–26 Feb, 1–2 Mar 1961		
Dwight Eisenhower	President	United States	10 December 1959		
Emperor Haile Selassie	Emperor	Ethiopian Empire	11—18 August 1956 –		
King Saud	King	Saudi Arabia	13–18 August 1955 26 November 1955	First visit by head of state of any of the two countries to the other	

== 2005–2009 ==
2005–2009 list
Name	Title	Country	Date	Visit Type	Reference
Mohamed Nasheed	President	Maldives	21 October 2009	India–Maldives relations, Climate change issues	
Julia Gillard	Deputy PM	Australia	1 September 2009	To try and restore confidence in Australia's education sector	
James L. Jones	National Security Advisor	United States |	25 June 2009	The US government's strategy in Afghanistan and Pakistan, Shared commitment to combat terrorism, Post–election situation in Iran, Energy and developing closer economic and trade links as well as defence ties	
David Miliband	Foreign Secretary	United Kingdom			
Gordon Brown	Prime Minister	United Kingdom	21 January 2008	Reform of the United Nations Security Council	
Gloria Macapagal Arroyo	President	Philippines	3–7 October 2007		
Luiz Inácio Lula da Silva	President	Brazil	3 June 2007		
Vladimir Putin	President	Russia	26 January 2007	State guest during the Republic Day Parade	
Gordon Brown	Chancellor of the Exchequer	United Kingdom			
Traian Basescu	President	Romania	22 October 2006		
George W Bush	President	United States	1 March 2006	Indo–US civilian nuclear agreement	
Jacques Chirac	President	France	19 February 2006	Civilian nuclear co–operation and defence co–operation	
Tony Blair	Prime Minister	United Kingdom	6 September 2005		
Pervez Musharraf	President	Pakistan	16 April 2005		
Stephen Harper	Prime Minister	Canada	17 November 2009		

== 2010 ==
2010 list
Name	Title	Country	Date	Visit Type/Purpose	Reference
Dmitry Medvedev	President	Russia	21 December 2010	Supported India's bid for UNSC membership	
Wen Jiabao	Premier	China	15 December 2010	Economic Issues,	
Nicolas Sarkozy	President	France	4 December 2010	Supported India's bid for UNSC membership, Civilian Nuclear Deal	
Barack Obama	President	United States	6 November 2010	Supported India's bid for UNSC membership as Permanent member	
David Cameron	Prime Minister	United Kingdom	26 July 2010	The business and economic relationship, The G–20 future agenda, Supported for UNSC seat as Permanent member, The future of Britain's and India's role in Afghanistan	
Than Shwe	Commander–in–Chief	Myanmar	25 July 2010	Economic issues	
Mahinda Rajapaksa	President	Sri Lanka	9 June 2010		
Hamid Karzai	President	Afghanistan	26 April 2010	Cooperation between two countries, Joint fight against terrorism	
Gurbanguly Berdimuhamedow	President	Turkmenistan	24 May 2010	First official visit of Berdimuhamedow to India, Development of trade and economic co–operation	
Mohamed Waheed Hassan	Vice–President	Maldives	19 February 2010	First official visit to India	
Ram Baran Yadav	President	Nepal	15 February 2010		
Abdullah Gül	President	Turkey	7 February 2010	Cooperation on economic and commercial relations	

== 2011 ==
2011 list
Name	Title	Country	Date	Visit Type/Purpose	Reference
Yoshihiko Noda	Prime Minister	Japan	22 December 2011		
Jigme Khesar Namgyel Wangchuck	King	Bhutan	20 October 2011		
John Key	Prime Minister	New Zealand	28–30 June 2011	State visit	
Angela Merkel	Chancellor	Germany	31 May 2011	Received the Jawaharlal Nehru Award for international understanding	
Islam Karimov	President	Uzbekistan	17 May 2011		
Yousaf Raza Gillani	Prime Minister	Pakistan	29 March 2011	Came to Mohali to watch the 2011 Cricket World Cup semi–final between India and Pakistan	
Leonel Fernández Reyna	President	Dominican Republic	30 January 2011		

== 2012 ==
2012 list
Name	Title	Country	Date	Visit Type/ Purpose	Reference
Ram Baran Yadav	President	Nepal	24 – 29 December 2012	Official Visit	
Viktor Yanukovych	President	Ukraine	9–12 December 2012	State Visit	
Mikhail Myasnikovich	Prime Minister	Belarus	13–14 November 2012	Working Visit	
Hamid Karzai	President	Afghanistan	9–13 November 2012	State Visit	
Stephen Harper	Prime Minister	Canada	4–9 November 2012	State Visit	
Juan Carlos I	King	Spain	24–27 October 2012	State Visit	
Julia Gillard	Prime Minister	Australia	15–17 October 2012	State Visit	
Pierre Nkurunziza	President	Burundi	17–29 September 2012		
Hamad bin Khalifa Al Thani	Emir	Qatar	April 2012		
Asif Ali Zardari	President	Pakistan	8 April 2012	Private visit	
Dmitry Medvedev	President	Russia	29 March 2012	2012 BRICS summit	
Jacob Zuma	President	South Africa	29 March 2012	2012 BRICS summit	
Dilma Rousseff	President	Brazil	29 March 2012	2012 BRICS summit	
Hu Jintao	General Secretary; President	China	29 March 2012	2012 BRICS summit	
Michael Sata	President	Zambia	22 March 2012		

== 2013 ==
2013 list
Name	Title	Country	Date	Visit Type/ Purpose	Reference
Hamid Karzai	President	Afghanistan	12 – 15 December 2013	Official Visit	
Akihito	Emperor and Empress	Japan	30 November – 5 December 2013	State Visit	
Nguyen Phu Trong	General Secretary	Vietnam	19 – 22 November 2013	State Visit	
Jaber Al–Mubarak Al–Hamad Al–Sabah	Prime Minister	Kuwait	7 – 10 November 2013	State Visit	
Viktor Orban	Prime Minister	Hungary	16 – 19 October 2013	State Visit	
Aga Khan IV	Imam of Nazari Islam	France	17 – 28 September 2013	Official Visit	
Ellen Johnson Sirleaf	President	Liberia	9 – 13 September 2013	State Visit	
Tshering Tobgay	Prime Minister	Bhutan	30 August – 4 September 2013	Official Visit	
Ueli Maurer	President	Switzerland	August 2013		
Nouri Kamil Al–Maliki	Prime Minister	Iraq	22 – 25 August 2013	State Visit	
Mohammad Karim Khalili	Vice President	Afghanistan	20 – 22 August 2013	Official Visit	
Joseph R. Biden Jr	Vice President	United States	22 – 25 July 2013	Official Visit	
Miroslav Lajcak	Deputy Prime Minister	Slovakia	17 – 20 June 2013	Official Visit	
Hamid Karzai	President	Afghanistan	20 – 22 May 2013	Official Visit	
Li Keqiang	Premier	China	19 – 22 May 2013	State Visit	
Olafur Ragnar	President	Iceland	31 March – 6 April 2013	Official Visit	
Mohamed Morsy	President	Egypt	18 – 20 March 2013	State Visit	
David Cameron	Prime Minister	United Kingdom	19 – 21 February 2013	Official Visit	
Francois Hollande	President	France	14 – 15 February 2013	State Visit	
Lyonchhen Jigmi Y. Thinley	Prime Minister	Bhutan	7 – 9 February 2013	Official Visit	
Jigme Khesar Namgyel Wangchuck	King	Bhutan	23 – 29 January 2013	State Visit	
Rashid Meredov	Deputy Prime Minister	Turkmenistan	21 – 22 January 2013	Official Visit	
Kailash Purryag	President	Mauritius	3–9 January 2013	State Visit	

== 2014 ==
2014 list
Name	Title	Country	Date	Visit Type/ Purpose	Reference
Abdul Hamid	President	Bangladesh	18–23 December 2014		
Vladimir Putin	President	Russia	10–11 December 2014	Official Visit	
Daniel Kablan Duncan	Prime Minister	Côte d'Ivoire	4 November 2014		
Nguyen Tan Dung	Prime Minister	Vietnam	27–28 October 2014	State Visit	
Xi Jinping	General Secretary; President	China	17–19 September 2014	State Visit	
Tony Abbott	Prime Minister	Australia	4–5 September 2014	State Visit	
Navin Ramgoolam	Prime Minister	Mauritius	26 May 2014	First oath of office ceremony of Narendra Modi	
Hamid Karzai	President	Afghanistan	26 May 2014	First oath of office ceremony of Narendra Modi	
Tshering Tobgay	Prime Minister	Bhutan	26 May 2014	First oath of office ceremony of Narendra Modi	
Abdulla Yameen Abdul Gayoom	President	Maldives	26 May 2014	First oath of office ceremony of Narendra Modi	
Sushil Koirala	Prime Minister	Nepal	26 May 2014	First oath of office ceremony of Narendra Modi	
Mahinda Rajapaksa	President	Sri Lanka	26 May 2014	First oath of office ceremony of Narendra Modi	
Nawaz Sharif	Prime Minister	Pakistan	26 May 2014	First oath of office ceremony of Narendra Modi	
Maha Chakri Sirindhorn	Princess	Thailand	23 – 28 February 2014	Official Visit	
Dmitry Mezentsev	Secretary General	Shanghai Cooperation Organisation	23 – 25 February 2014	Working Visit	
David Johnston	Governor General	Canada	22 February – 2 March 2014	State Visit	
Hamad bin Isa Al Khalifa	King	Bahrain	18 – 20 February 2014	State Visit	
Joachim Gauck	President	Germany	4 – 9 February 2014	State Visit	
Ali Mohamed Shein	President	Zanzibar	1 – 9 February 2014	Official Visit	
Shinzo Abe	Prime Minister	Japan	25–27 January 2014	Official Visit	
Park Geun–Hye	President	South Korea	15 – 18 January 2014	State Visit	
Jigme Khesar Namgyel Wangchuck and Jetsun Pema Wangchuck	King and Queen	Bhutan	6 – 10 January 2014	Official Visit	
Abdulla Yameen Abdul Gayoom	President	Maldives	1 – 4 January 2014	State Visit	

== 2015 ==
2015 list
Name	Title	Country	Date	Visit Type/ Purpose	Reference
Shinzo Abe	Prime Minister	Japan	11–13 December 2015	Official Visit	
Ameenah Gurib–Fakim	President	Mauritius	6 – 10 December 2015	Official Visit	
Li Yuanchao	Vice President	China	3 – 7 November 2015	Official Visit	
Kamal Thapa	Deputy Prime Minister	Nepal	17 – 19 October 2015	Official Visit	
Angela Merkel	Chancellor	Germany	4–6 October 2015	Official Visit	
Ranil Wickremesinghe	Prime Minister	Sri Lanka	14–16 September 2015	Official Visit	
James Alix Michel	President	Seychelles	25–27 August 2015	State Visit	
Filipe Nyusi	President	Mozambique	4–8 August 2015	State Visit	
Jakaya Kikwete	President	Tanzania	17–21 June 2015	State Visit	
Mark Rutte	Prime Minister	Netherlands	5–6 June 2015	Official Visit	
Ashraf Ghani	President	Afghanistan	27 April 2015	State Visit	
Tamim bin Hamad Al Thani	Emir	Qatar	24–25 March 2015	State Visit	
Maithripala Sirisena	President	Sri Lanka	15–18 February 2015	State Visit	
Tony Tan	President	Singapore	8–11 February 2015	State Visit	
Barack Obama	President	United States	25–27 January 2015	State Visit and Chief Guest at the Republic Day	
Sai Mauk Kham	Vice President	Myanmar	19 –12 January 2015	Official Visit	
Tshering Tobgay	Prime Minister	Bhutan	10–18 January 2015	Official Visit	
Ban Ki–moon	Secretary–General of the United Nations	United Nations	1 –19 January 2015	Official Visit	
Donald Ramotar	President	Guyana	7–12 January 2015	Official Visit	

== 2016 ==
2016 list
Name	Title	Country	Date	Visit Type	Reference
Almazbek Sharshenovich Atambayev	President	Kyrgyzstan	18–21 December 2016	State visit	
Emomali Rahmon	President	Tajikistan	14–18 December 2016	State visit	
Joko Widodo	President	Indonesia	12–13 December 2016	State visit	
Ashraf Ghani	President	Afghanistan	3–4 December 2016	To jointly inaugurate 6th Ministerial Conference of Heart of Asia summit in Amritsar, India with PM Narendra Modi	
Sheikh Abdullah Bin Nasser Bin Khalifa Al–Thani	Prime Minister	Qatar	2 –3 December 2016	State Visit	
Reuven Rivlin	President	Israel	14–21 November 2016	State visit	
Maithripala Sirisena	President	Sri Lanka	6–7 November 2016	State visit	
Theresa May	Prime Minister	United Kingdom	6–8 November 2016	State visit	
John Key	Prime Minister	New Zealand	24–27 October 2016	State visit	
Sheikh Hasina	Prime Minister	Bangladesh	16 October 2016	Bay of Bengal Initiative for Multi–Sectoral Technical and Economic Cooperation Summit	
Tshering Tobgay	Prime Minister	Bhutan	16 October 2016	Bay of Bengal Initiative for Multi–Sectoral Technical and Economic Cooperation Summit	
Aung San Suu Kyi	State Counsellor of Myanmar	Myanmar	16–19 October 2016	Bay of Bengal Initiative for Multi–Sectoral Technical and Economic Cooperation Summit	
Pushpa Kamal Dahal	Prime Minister	Nepal	16 October 2016	Bay of Bengal Initiative for Multi–Sectoral Technical and Economic Cooperation Summit	
Virasakdi Futrakul	Special envoy of Prime Minister	Thailand	16 October 2016	Bay of Bengal Initiative for Multi–Sectoral Technical and Economic Cooperation Summit	
Maithripala Sirisena	President	Sri Lanka	16 October 2016	Bay of Bengal Initiative for Multi–Sectoral Technical and Economic Cooperation Summit	
Michel Temer	President	Brazil	15–16 October 2016	8th BRICS summit	
Vladimir Putin	President	Russia	15–16 October 2016	8th BRICS summit	
Xi Jinping	General Secretary; President	China	15–16 October 2016	8th BRICS summit	
Jacob Zuma	President	South Africa	15–16 October 2016	8th BRICS summit	
Ranil Wickremesinghe	Prime Minister	Sri Lanka	4–6 October 2016	State Visit	
Lee Hsien Loong	Prime Minister	Singapore	3–7 October 2016	State Visit	
Pushpa Kamal Dahal	Prime Minister	Nepal	15–18 September 2016	State Visit	
Ashraf Ghani	President	Afghanistan	14–15 September 2016	Official Visit	
Abdel Fattah Al Sisi	President	Egypt	1 – 3 September 2016	State Visit	
Htin Kyaw	President	Myanmar	27–30 August 2016	State Visit	
Ahmad Zahid Bin Hamidi	Deputy Prime Minister	Malaysia	17 – 20 July 2016	Official Visit	
Prayut Chan–o–cha	Prime Minister	Thailand	16–18 June 2016	State Visit	
Frank Bainimarama	President	Fiji	19 May 2016	Private	
Maithripala Sirisena	President	Sri Lanka	13–14 May 2016	Official Visit	
Abdulla Yameen	President	Maldives	11–12 April 2016	State Visit	
William and Catherine	Duke and Duchess of Cambridge	United Kingdom	10–13 and 16 April 2016	First visit by the Duke and Duchess to India	
KP Oli	Prime Minister	Nepal	18–24 February 2016	State Visit	
Tshering Tobgay	Prime Minister	Bhutan	16 February 2016	Official Visit	
Stefan Löfven	Prime Minister	Sweden	12 – 14 February 2016	Working Visit	
Juha Sipilä	Prime Minister	Finland	12 – 14 February 2016	Working Visit	
Mohammed bin Zayed Al Nahyan	Crown Prince	United Arab Emirates	10–12 February 2016	State Visit	
Abdullah Abdullah	Chief Executive	Afghanistan	31 January – 4 February 2016	Official Visit	
François Hollande	President	France	24–26 January 2016	State Visit and Chief Guest of India Republic Day 2016	
Walid Al Moualem	Deputy Prime Minister	Syria	11 – 14 January 2016	Official Visit	

== 2017 ==
2017 list
Name	Title	Country	Date	Visit Type	Reference
Dmitry Rogozin	Deputy Prime Minister	Russia	23 December 2017	Working Visit	
Patricia Scotland	Commonwealth Secretary General	Commonwealth of Nations	13 – 16 December 2017	Official Visit	
Ranil Wickremesinghe	Prime Minister	Sri Lanka	21 – 24 November 2017	Official Visit	
Charles and Camilla	Prince of Wales and Duchess of Cornwall	United Kingdom	8 – 9 November 2017	Official Visit	
Philippe and Mathilde	King and Queen	Belgium	5 – 11 November 2017	State Visit	
Maris Kucinskis	Prime Minister	Latvia	2 – 6 November 2017	Official Visit	
Serzh Sargsyan	President	Armenia	2 – 4 November 2017	Official Visit	
Jigme Khesar Namgyel Wangchuck and Jetsun Pema Wangchuck	King and Queen	Bhutan	31 October – 3 November 2017	Official Visit	
Paolo Gentiloni	Prime Minister	Italy	30 October 2017	State Visit	
Mohammad Ashraf Ghani	President	Afghanistan	24 October 2017	State Visit	
Abdullah Abdullah	Chief Executive	Afghanistan	27 – 29 October 2017	Working Visit	
Shinzo Abe	Prime Minister	Japan	13 – 14 September 2017	State Visit	
Alexander Lukashenko	President	Belarus	11 – 12 September 2017	State Visit	
Doris Leuthard	President	Switzerland	30 August – 2 September 2017	State Visit	
Sher Bahadur Deuba	Prime Minister	Nepal	23 – 27 August 2017	State Visit	
Rashid Meredov	Vice President, Minister of Foreign Affairs	Turkmenistan	13 – 15 August 2017	Working Visit	
Abdulmalik Abduljalil Al–Mekhlafi	Deputy Prime Minister	Yemen	10 –13 July 2017	Working Visit	
Pham Binh Minh	Deputy Prime Minister	Vietnam	3 – 6 July 2017	Working Visit	
Pravind Jugnauth	Prime Minister	Mauritius	26–28 May 2017	State Visit	
Mahmoud Abbas	President	Palestine	14 – 17 May 2017	State Visit	
Igor Shuvalov	Deputy Prime Minister	Russia	9 May 2017	Working Visit	
Recep Tayyip Erdogan	President	Turkey	30 April – 1 May 2017	State Visit	
Nicos Anastasiades	President	Cyprus	25 – 29 April 2017	State Visit	
Ranil Wickremesinghe	Prime Minister	Sri Lanka	25 – 28 April 2017	Working Visit	
Bidhya Devi Bhandari	President	Nepal	17 – 19 April 2017	State Visit	
Malcolm Turnbull	Prime Minister	Australia	10–13 April 2017	State visit	
Sheikh Hasina	Prime Minister	Bangladesh	7 – 10 April 2017	State visit	
Najib Razak	Prime Minister	Malaysia	30 March 4 April 2017	State visit	
Yuri Trutnev	Deputy Prime Minister	Russia	15 – 18 March 2017	Working Visit	
Mswati III	King	Swaziland	8 –15 March 2017	Working Visit	
Ruhakana Rugunda	Prime Minister	Uganda	7 – 12 March 2017	Working visit	
Fayez Tarawneh	Chief of Royal Court	Jordan	7 – 10 March 2017	Working Visit	
Mohammed bin Zayed Al Nahyan	Crown Prince of Abu Dhabi	United Arab Emirates	24–26 January 2017	State visit & Chief Guest of Indian Republic Day	
Uhuru Kenyatta	President	Kenya	10 – 12 January 2017	State visit	
Paul Kagame	President	Rwanda	9 – 11 January 2017	State visit	
Aleksandar Vučić	Prime Minister	Serbia	9 – 12 January 2017	To Attend Vibrant Gujarat Summit	
António Costa	Prime Minister	Portugal	7–13 January 2017	State visit	
Ashwin Adhin	Vice President of Suriname	Suriname	5 – 14 January 2017	Bhartiya pravashi diwas	

== 2018 ==
Name	Country	Title	Date	Places visited	Visit Purpose	Notes
Benjamin Netanyahu	Israel	Prime Minister	14–19 January	New Delhi, Ahmedabad, Vadrad, Mumbai	Official visit, Raisina Dialogue 2018	Visit commemorated 25 years of diplomatic relations between India and Israel.
Aung San Suu Kyi	Myanmar	State Counsellor	25–26 January	New Delhi	69th Republic Day parade	The leaders of all 10 ASEAN member states were invited as chief guests.
Joko Widodo	Indonesia	President	25–26 January	New Delhi	69th Republic Day parade	The leaders of all 10 ASEAN member states were invited as chief guests.
Hassanal Bolkiah	Brunei	Sultan	25–26 January	New Delhi	69th Republic Day parade	The leaders of all 10 ASEAN member states were invited as chief guests.
Thongloun Sisoulith	Laos	Prime Minister	25–26 January	New Delhi	69th Republic Day parade	The leaders of all 10 ASEAN member states were invited as chief guests.
Najib Razak	Malaysia	Prime Minister	25–26 January	New Delhi	69th Republic Day parade	The leaders of all 10 ASEAN member states were invited as chief guests.
Rodrigo Duterte	Philippines	President	25–26 January	New Delhi	69th Republic Day parade	The leaders of all 10 ASEAN member states were invited as chief guests.
Lee Hsien Loong	Singapore	Prime Minister	25–26 January	New Delhi	69th Republic Day parade	The leaders of all 10 ASEAN member states were invited as chief guests.
Prayut Chan-o-cha	Thailand	Prime Minister	25–26 January	New Delhi	69th Republic Day parade	The leaders of all 10 ASEAN member states were invited as chief guests.
Nguyễn Xuân Phúc	Vietnam	Prime Minister	25–26 January	New Delhi	69th Republic Day parade	The leaders of all 10 ASEAN member states were invited as chief guests.
Hun Sen	Cambodia	Prime Minister	24–27 January	New Delhi	State visit, 69th Republic Day parade	The leaders of all 10 ASEAN member states were invited as chief guests.
Hassan Rouhani	Iran	President	15–18 February	Hyderabad, New Delhi	State visit	
Justin Trudeau	Canada	Prime Minister	17–24 February	Agra, Ahmedabad, Mumbai, Amritsar, New Delhi	State visit	
Abdullah II	Jordan	King	27 February–1 March	New Delhi	State visit	
Trần Đại Quang	Vietnam	President	2–4 March	Bodh Gaya, New Delhi	State visit	
Faure Essozimna Gnassingbe	Togo	President	Varying arrivals from 8–10 March (conference on 11 March)	New Delhi	International Solar Alliance Summit	Other representatives: Leonard She Okitundu, Vice Prime Minister of the Democratic Republic of Congo, Ivan Collendavelloo, Deputy Prime Minister of Mauritius, Ashwin Adhin, Vice President of Suriname, Daniel Kablan Duncan, Vice President of Ivory Coast, Mahdi Mohamed Guled, Deputy Prime Minister of Somalia, Peter Cosgrove, Governor General of Australia and Sheikh Hamed Bin Zayed Al Nahyan, Chairman of the Crown Prince Court of Abu Dhabi.
Roch Marc Christian Kaboré	Burkina Faso	President	Varying arrivals from 8–10 March (conference on 11 March)	New Delhi	International Solar Alliance Summit	Other representatives: Leonard She Okitundu, Vice Prime Minister of the Democratic Republic of Congo, Ivan Collendavelloo, Deputy Prime Minister of Mauritius, Ashwin Adhin, Vice President of Suriname, Daniel Kablan Duncan, Vice President of Ivory Coast, Mahdi Mohamed Guled, Deputy Prime Minister of Somalia, Peter Cosgrove, Governor General of Australia and Sheikh Hamed Bin Zayed Al Nahyan, Chairman of the Crown Prince Court of Abu Dhabi.
Albert Pahimi Padacke	Chad	Prime Minister	Varying arrivals from 8–10 March (conference on 11 March)	New Delhi	International Solar Alliance Summit	Other representatives: Leonard She Okitundu, Vice Prime Minister of the Democratic Republic of Congo, Ivan Collendavelloo, Deputy Prime Minister of Mauritius, Ashwin Adhin, Vice President of Suriname, Daniel Kablan Duncan, Vice President of Ivory Coast, Mahdi Mohamed Guled, Deputy Prime Minister of Somalia, Peter Cosgrove, Governor General of Australia and Sheikh Hamed Bin Zayed Al Nahyan, Chairman of the Crown Prince Court of Abu Dhabi.
Ibrahim Baoubacar Keita	Mali	President	Varying arrivals from 8–10 March (conference on 11 March)	New Delhi	International Solar Alliance Summit	Other representatives: Leonard She Okitundu, Vice Prime Minister of the Democratic Republic of Congo, Ivan Collendavelloo, Deputy Prime Minister of Mauritius, Ashwin Adhin, Vice President of Suriname, Daniel Kablan Duncan, Vice President of Ivory Coast, Mahdi Mohamed Guled, Deputy Prime Minister of Somalia, Peter Cosgrove, Governor General of Australia and Sheikh Hamed Bin Zayed Al Nahyan, Chairman of the Crown Prince Court of Abu Dhabi.
Nana Addo Dankwa Akufo-Addo	Ghana	President	Varying arrivals from 8–10 March (conference on 11 March)	New Delhi	International Solar Alliance Summit	Other representatives: Leonard She Okitundu, Vice Prime Minister of the Democratic Republic of Congo, Ivan Collendavelloo, Deputy Prime Minister of Mauritius, Ashwin Adhin, Vice President of Suriname, Daniel Kablan Duncan, Vice President of Ivory Coast, Mahdi Mohamed Guled, Deputy Prime Minister of Somalia, Peter Cosgrove, Governor General of Australia and Sheikh Hamed Bin Zayed Al Nahyan, Chairman of the Crown Prince Court of Abu Dhabi.
Paul Kagame	Rwanda	President	Varying arrivals from 8–10 March (conference on 11 March)	New Delhi	International Solar Alliance Summit	Other representatives: Leonard She Okitundu, Vice Prime Minister of the Democratic Republic of Congo, Ivan Collendavelloo, Deputy Prime Minister of Mauritius, Ashwin Adhin, Vice President of Suriname, Daniel Kablan Duncan, Vice President of Ivory Coast, Mahdi Mohamed Guled, Deputy Prime Minister of Somalia, Peter Cosgrove, Governor General of Australia and Sheikh Hamed Bin Zayed Al Nahyan, Chairman of the Crown Prince Court of Abu Dhabi.
Azali Assoumani	Comoros	President	Varying arrivals from 8–10 March (conference on 11 March)	New Delhi	International Solar Alliance Summit	Other representatives: Leonard She Okitundu, Vice Prime Minister of the Democratic Republic of Congo, Ivan Collendavelloo, Deputy Prime Minister of Mauritius, Ashwin Adhin, Vice President of Suriname, Daniel Kablan Duncan, Vice President of Ivory Coast, Mahdi Mohamed Guled, Deputy Prime Minister of Somalia, Peter Cosgrove, Governor General of Australia and Sheikh Hamed Bin Zayed Al Nahyan, Chairman of the Crown Prince Court of Abu Dhabi.
Teodoro Obiang Nguema Mbasogo	Equatorial Guinea	President	Varying arrivals from 8–10 March (conference on 11 March)	New Delhi	International Solar Alliance Summit	Other representatives: Leonard She Okitundu, Vice Prime Minister of the Democratic Republic of Congo, Ivan Collendavelloo, Deputy Prime Minister of Mauritius, Ashwin Adhin, Vice President of Suriname, Daniel Kablan Duncan, Vice President of Ivory Coast, Mahdi Mohamed Guled, Deputy Prime Minister of Somalia, Peter Cosgrove, Governor General of Australia and Sheikh Hamed Bin Zayed Al Nahyan, Chairman of the Crown Prince Court of Abu Dhabi.
Issoufou Mahamadou	Niger	President	Varying arrivals from 8–10 March (conference on 11 March)	New Delhi	International Solar Alliance Summit	Other representatives: Leonard She Okitundu, Vice Prime Minister of the Democratic Republic of Congo, Ivan Collendavelloo, Deputy Prime Minister of Mauritius, Ashwin Adhin, Vice President of Suriname, Daniel Kablan Duncan, Vice President of Ivory Coast, Mahdi Mohamed Guled, Deputy Prime Minister of Somalia, Peter Cosgrove, Governor General of Australia and Sheikh Hamed Bin Zayed Al Nahyan, Chairman of the Crown Prince Court of Abu Dhabi.
Ismail Omar Guelleh	Djibouti	President	Varying arrivals from 8–10 March (conference on 11 March)	New Delhi	International Solar Alliance Summit	Other representatives: Leonard She Okitundu, Vice Prime Minister of the Democratic Republic of Congo, Ivan Collendavelloo, Deputy Prime Minister of Mauritius, Ashwin Adhin, Vice President of Suriname, Daniel Kablan Duncan, Vice President of Ivory Coast, Mahdi Mohamed Guled, Deputy Prime Minister of Somalia, Peter Cosgrove, Governor General of Australia and Sheikh Hamed Bin Zayed Al Nahyan, Chairman of the Crown Prince Court of Abu Dhabi.
Ali Bongo Ondimba	Gabon	President	Varying arrivals from 8–10 March (conference on 11 March)	New Delhi	International Solar Alliance Summit	Other representatives: Leonard She Okitundu, Vice Prime Minister of the Democratic Republic of Congo, Ivan Collendavelloo, Deputy Prime Minister of Mauritius, Ashwin Adhin, Vice President of Suriname, Daniel Kablan Duncan, Vice President of Ivory Coast, Mahdi Mohamed Guled, Deputy Prime Minister of Somalia, Peter Cosgrove, Governor General of Australia and Sheikh Hamed Bin Zayed Al Nahyan, Chairman of the Crown Prince Court of Abu Dhabi.
Josaia Voreqe Bainimariama	Fiji	Prime Minister	Varying arrivals from 8–10 March (conference on 11 March)	New Delhi	International Solar Alliance Summit	Other representatives: Leonard She Okitundu, Vice Prime Minister of the Democratic Republic of Congo, Ivan Collendavelloo, Deputy Prime Minister of Mauritius, Ashwin Adhin, Vice President of Suriname, Daniel Kablan Duncan, Vice President of Ivory Coast, Mahdi Mohamed Guled, Deputy Prime Minister of Somalia, Peter Cosgrove, Governor General of Australia and Sheikh Hamed Bin Zayed Al Nahyan, Chairman of the Crown Prince Court of Abu Dhabi.
Enele Sopoaga	Tuvalu	Prime Minister	Varying arrivals from 8–10 March (conference on 11 March)	New Delhi	International Solar Alliance Summit	Other representatives: Leonard She Okitundu, Vice Prime Minister of the Democratic Republic of Congo, Ivan Collendavelloo, Deputy Prime Minister of Mauritius, Ashwin Adhin, Vice President of Suriname, Daniel Kablan Duncan, Vice President of Ivory Coast, Mahdi Mohamed Guled, Deputy Prime Minister of Somalia, Peter Cosgrove, Governor General of Australia and Sheikh Hamed Bin Zayed Al Nahyan, Chairman of the Crown Prince Court of Abu Dhabi.
Charlot Salwai	Vanuatu	Prime Minister	Varying arrivals from 8–10 March (conference on 11 March)	New Delhi	International Solar Alliance Summit	Other representatives: Leonard She Okitundu, Vice Prime Minister of the Democratic Republic of Congo, Ivan Collendavelloo, Deputy Prime Minister of Mauritius, Ashwin Adhin, Vice President of Suriname, Daniel Kablan Duncan, Vice President of Ivory Coast, Mahdi Mohamed Guled, Deputy Prime Minister of Somalia, Peter Cosgrove, Governor General of Australia and Sheikh Hamed Bin Zayed Al Nahyan, Chairman of the Crown Prince Court of Abu Dhabi.
Baron Waqa	Nauru	President	Varying arrivals from 8–10 March (conference on 11 March)	New Delhi	International Solar Alliance Summit	Other representatives: Leonard She Okitundu, Vice Prime Minister of the Democratic Republic of Congo, Ivan Collendavelloo, Deputy Prime Minister of Mauritius, Ashwin Adhin, Vice President of Suriname, Daniel Kablan Duncan, Vice President of Ivory Coast, Mahdi Mohamed Guled, Deputy Prime Minister of Somalia, Peter Cosgrove, Governor General of Australia and Sheikh Hamed Bin Zayed Al Nahyan, Chairman of the Crown Prince Court of Abu Dhabi.
Danny Faure	Seychelles	President	Varying arrivals from 8–10 March (conference on 11 March)	New Delhi	International Solar Alliance Summit	Other representatives: Leonard She Okitundu, Vice Prime Minister of the Democratic Republic of Congo, Ivan Collendavelloo, Deputy Prime Minister of Mauritius, Ashwin Adhin, Vice President of Suriname, Daniel Kablan Duncan, Vice President of Ivory Coast, Mahdi Mohamed Guled, Deputy Prime Minister of Somalia, Peter Cosgrove, Governor General of Australia and Sheikh Hamed Bin Zayed Al Nahyan, Chairman of the Crown Prince Court of Abu Dhabi.
David Arthur Granger	Guyana	President	Varying arrivals from 8–10 March (conference on 11 March)	New Delhi	International Solar Alliance Summit	Other representatives: Leonard She Okitundu, Vice Prime Minister of the Democratic Republic of Congo, Ivan Collendavelloo, Deputy Prime Minister of Mauritius, Ashwin Adhin, Vice President of Suriname, Daniel Kablan Duncan, Vice President of Ivory Coast, Mahdi Mohamed Guled, Deputy Prime Minister of Somalia, Peter Cosgrove, Governor General of Australia and Sheikh Hamed Bin Zayed Al Nahyan, Chairman of the Crown Prince Court of Abu Dhabi.
Abdul Hamid	Bangladesh	President	Varying arrivals from 8–10 March (conference on 11 March)	New Delhi	International Solar Alliance Summit	Other representatives: Leonard She Okitundu, Vice Prime Minister of the Democratic Republic of Congo, Ivan Collendavelloo, Deputy Prime Minister of Mauritius, Ashwin Adhin, Vice President of Suriname, Daniel Kablan Duncan, Vice President of Ivory Coast, Mahdi Mohamed Guled, Deputy Prime Minister of Somalia, Peter Cosgrove, Governor General of Australia and Sheikh Hamed Bin Zayed Al Nahyan, Chairman of the Crown Prince Court of Abu Dhabi.
Maithripala Sirisena	Sri Lanka	President	Varying arrivals from 8–10 March (conference on 11 March)	New Delhi	International Solar Alliance Summit	Other representatives: Leonard She Okitundu, Vice Prime Minister of the Democratic Republic of Congo, Ivan Collendavelloo, Deputy Prime Minister of Mauritius, Ashwin Adhin, Vice President of Suriname, Daniel Kablan Duncan, Vice President of Ivory Coast, Mahdi Mohamed Guled, Deputy Prime Minister of Somalia, Peter Cosgrove, Governor General of Australia and Sheikh Hamed Bin Zayed Al Nahyan, Chairman of the Crown Prince Court of Abu Dhabi.
Emmanuel Macron	France	President	9–12 March	New Delhi, Agra, Varanasi, Mirzapur	State visit, International Solar Alliance Summit	Other representatives: Leonard She Okitundu, Vice Prime Minister of the Democratic Republic of Congo, Ivan Collendavelloo, Deputy Prime Minister of Mauritius, Ashwin Adhin, Vice President of Suriname, Daniel Kablan Duncan, Vice President of Ivory Coast, Mahdi Mohamed Guled, Deputy Prime Minister of Somalia, Peter Cosgrove, Governor General of Australia and Sheikh Hamed Bin Zayed Al Nahyan, Chairman of the Crown Prince Court of Abu Dhabi.
Frank–Walter Steinmeier	Germany	President	22–25 March	Varanasi, Sarnath, New Delhi, Chennai, Mahabalipuram	State visit	
K.P. Sharma Oli	Nepal	Prime Minister	6–8 April	New Delhi, Pantnagar	State visit	
Mark Rutte	Netherlands	Prime Minister	24–25 May	New Delhi, Bengaluru	Official visit	
Danny Faure	Seychelles	President	22–27 June	Ahmedabad, Goa, New Delhi, Dehradun	State visit	
Tshering Tobgay	Bhutan	Prime Minister	5–7 July	New Delhi	Official visit	
Moon Jae–in	South Korea	President	8–11 July	New Delhi, Noida	State visit	
Shavkat Mirziyoyev	Uzbekistan	President	30 September–1 October	Agra, New Delhi	State visit	
Vladimir Putin	Russia	President	4–5 October	New Delhi	19th India–Russia Annual Summit	
Ranil Wickremesinghe	Sri Lanka	Prime Minister	18–20 October	New Delhi	Official visit	
Giuseppe Conte	Italy	Prime Minister	29–30 October	New Delhi	Official visit	
Ibrahim Mohamed Solih	Maldives	President	16–18 December	New Delhi, Agra	State visit	
Lotay Tshering	Bhutan	Prime Minister	27–29 December	New Delhi	State visit	

== 2019 ==
2019 list
Name	Country	Title	Date(s)	Places Visited	Visit Purpose	Notes
Erna Solberg	Norway	Prime Minister	7–9 January	New Delhi, Ghaziabad	State visit, Raisina Dialogue 2019	
Pravind Jugnauth	Mauritius	Prime Minister	20–28 January	New Delhi, Varanasi, Prayagraj, Mumbai	Official visit, 15th Pravasi Bharatiya Divas Convention 2023	Attended the PBD Convention in Varanasi, visited the Kumbh Mela in Prayagraj and was the Chief Guest at the Republic Day celebrations in Mumbai.
Cyril Ramaphosa	South Africa	President	25–26 January	New Delhi	State visit, 70th Republic Day parade	
Albert II, Prince of Monaco	Monaco	Prince of Monaco	4–10 February	New Delhi, Udaipur	Official visit	
Mauricio Macri	Argentina	President	17–19 February	Agra, New Delhi, Mumbai	State visit	
Mohammad bin Salman	Saudi Arabia	Crown Prince	19– 20 February	New Delhi	State visit	
Ibrahima Kassory Fofana	Guinea	Prime Minister	16–25 March	New Delhi, Vishakhapatnam	Official visit	
Lotay Tshering	Bhutan	Prime Minister	30–31 May	New Delhi	Second oath of office ceremony of Prime Minister Narendra Modi	Leaders of 8 countries (all BIMSTEC countries excluding India, plus Kyrgyzstan and Mauritius), were invited to the swearing-in ceremony. Thailand was represented by Special envoy Grisada Boonrach.
KP Sharma Oli	Nepal	Prime Minister	30–31 May	New Delhi	Second oath of office ceremony of Prime Minister Narendra Modi	Leaders of 8 countries (all BIMSTEC countries excluding India, plus Kyrgyzstan and Mauritius), were invited to the swearing-in ceremony. Thailand was represented by Special envoy Grisada Boonrach.
Abdul Hamid	Bangladesh	President	30–31 May	New Delhi	Second oath of office ceremony of Prime Minister Narendra Modi	Leaders of 8 countries (all BIMSTEC countries excluding India, plus Kyrgyzstan and Mauritius), were invited to the swearing-in ceremony. Thailand was represented by Special envoy Grisada Boonrach.
Maithripala Sirisena	Sri Lanka	President	30–31 May	New Delhi	Second oath of office ceremony of Prime Minister Narendra Modi	Leaders of 8 countries (all BIMSTEC countries excluding India, plus Kyrgyzstan and Mauritius), were invited to the swearing-in ceremony. Thailand was represented by Special envoy Grisada Boonrach.
Pravind Jugnauth	Mauritius	Prime Minister	30–31 May	New Delhi	Second oath of office ceremony of Prime Minister Narendra Modi	Leaders of 8 countries (all BIMSTEC countries excluding India, plus Kyrgyzstan and Mauritius), were invited to the swearing-in ceremony. Thailand was represented by Special envoy Grisada Boonrach.
Win Myint	Myanmar	President	30–31 May	New Delhi	Second oath of office ceremony of Prime Minister Narendra Modi	Leaders of 8 countries (all BIMSTEC countries excluding India, plus Kyrgyzstan and Mauritius), were invited to the swearing-in ceremony. Thailand was represented by Special envoy Grisada Boonrach.
Sooronbay Jeenbekov	Kyrgyzstan	President	30–31 May	New Delhi	Second oath of office ceremony of Prime Minister Narendra Modi	Leaders of 8 countries (all BIMSTEC countries excluding India, plus Kyrgyzstan and Mauritius), were invited to the swearing-in ceremony. Thailand was represented by Special envoy Grisada Boonrach.
Edgar Lungu	Zambia	President	20–22 August	New Delhi	State visit	First incoming bilateral leader visit following the 17th Lok Sabha elections.
Khaltmaagiin Battulga	Mongolia	President	19–23 September	New Delhi, Agra, Bodh Gaya, Bengaluru	State visit	
Sheikh Hasina	Bangladesh	Prime Minister	3–6 October	New Delhi	Official visit	
Xi Jinping	China	President	11–12 October	Chennai, Mahabalipuram	2nd China–India Informal Summit	Follows the 1st China–India Informal Summit in Wuhan in April 2018.
Willem-Alexander	Netherlands	King	14–18 October	New Delhi, Mumbai, Kochi, Alappuzha	State visit	Accompanied by Queen Máxima.
Angela Merkel	Germany	Chancellor	31 October–2 November	New Delhi, Gurgaon	State visit	PM Modi and Chancellor Merkel co-chaired the 5th India–Germany Inter-Governmental Consultations
Gotabaya Rajapaksa	Sri Lanka	President	28–30 November	New Delhi	State visit	
Carl XVI Gustaf	Sweden	King	1–6 December	New Delhi, Mumbai, Rishikesh, Haridwar	State visit	Accompanied by Queen Silvia. The King's third visit to India, the previous two being in 1993 and 2005.
António Costa	Portugal	Prime Minister	19–20 December	New Delhi	Woking visit	

== 2020 ==
Name	Country	Designation	Date	Places visited	Type of visit	Notes
Jair Bolsonaro	Brazil	President	24–27 January	New Delhi, Agra	State visit, 71st Republic Day parade	
Mahinda Rajapaksa	Sri Lanka	Prime Minister	7–11 February	New Delhi, Varanasi, Sarnath, Bodh Gaya, Tirupati	State visit	
Marcelo Rebelo de Sousa	Portugal	President	13–16 February	New Delhi, Mumbai, Goa	State visit	First visit by a President of Portugal to India since 2007.
Donald Trump	United States	President	24–25 February	Ahmedabad, Agra, New Delhi	State visit	
Win Myint	Myanmar	President	26–29 February	New Delhi, Bodh Gaya, Agra	State visit	

== 2021 ==
Name	Country/Organisation	Designation	Date	Places visited	Type of visit	Notes
Mette Frederiksen	Denmark	Prime Minister	9–11 October 2021	New Delhi	State visit	
Vladimir Putin	Russia	President	6 December 2021	New Delhi	21st India–Russia Annual Summit	

== 2022 ==
Name	Country	Designation	Date(s)	Places Visited	Type/Purpose of visit	Notes
Fumio Kishida	Japan	Prime Minister	19–20 March	New Delhi	14th India–Japan Annual Summit	The previous India–Japan Annual Summit took place during PM Modi's visit to Japan in October 2018.
Sher Bahadur Deuba	Nepal	Prime Minister	1–3 April	New Delhi, Varanasi	Official visit	
Pravind Kumar Jugnauth	Mauritius	Prime Minister	17–24 April	Mumbai, Jamnagar, Gandhinagar, Varanasi, New Delhi		
Boris Johnson	United Kingdom	Prime Minister	21–22 April	Ahmedabad, New Delhi	State visit	
Ursula von der Leyen	European Union	President of the European Commission	24–25 April	New Delhi	Raisina Dialogue 2022	
Ibrahim Mohamed Solih	Maldives	President	1–4 August	New Delhi, Mumbai	Official visit	
Sheikh Hasina	Bangladesh	Prime Minister	5–8 September	New Delhi, Jaipur	State visit	

== 2023 ==
Name	Country/Organisation	Designation	Date	Places Visited	Type/Purpose of visit	Notes
Chandrikapersad Santokhi	Suriname	President	7–14 January	Jamnagar, Indore, Ahmedabad, New Delhi	17th Pravasi Bharatiya Divas Convention 2023	The Pravasi Bharatiya Divas (PBD) Convention is held once every two years.
Irfan Ali	Guyana	President	8–14 January	Indore, Agra, New Delhi, Kanpur, Bengaluru, Mumbai	17th Pravasi Bharatiya Divas Convention 2023	The Pravasi Bharatiya Divas (PBD) Convention is held once every two years.
Abdel Fattah el-Sisi	Egypt	President	24–27 January	New Delhi	State Visit, 74th Republic Day Parade	
Olaf Sholz	Germany	Chancellor	25–26 February	New Delhi, Bengaluru	State Visit	
Giorgia Meloni	Italy	Prime Minister	2–3 March	New Delhi	State Visit, Raisina Dialogue 2023	
Anthony Albanese	Australia	Prime Minister	8–11 March	Ahmedabad, Mumbai, New Delhi	State Visit	
Fumio Kishida	Japan	Prime Minister	20–21 March	New Delhi	Official Visit	
Jigme Khesar Namgyel Wangchuck	Bhutan	King	3–5 April	New Delhi	Official Visit	
Norodom Sihamoni	Cambodia	King	29–31 May	New Delhi	State Visit	
Pushpa Kamal Dahal	Nepal	Prime Minister	31 May–3 June	New Delhi, Indore	Official Visit	
Ranil Wickremesinghe	Sri Lanka	President	20–21 July	New Delhi	Official Visit	
Joe Biden	United States	President	9–10 September	New Delhi	2023 G20 New Delhi summit	There were five leaders who were invited but did not attend (3 G20 members and 2 invitees): The Chinese leader Xi Jinping was represented by Premier Li Qiang. The President of Russia Vladimir Putin was represented by Foreign Minister Sergei Lavrov. The President of Mexico Andrés Manuel López Obrador (who had a practice of skipping almost all foreign trips and never attended any G20 summits in his presidency) was represented by Minister of Economy Raquel Buenrostro Sánchez. The Prime Minister of Spain Pedro Sánchez (who tested positive for COVID two days before the summit) was represented by First Deputy PM and Minister of Economic affairs Nadia Calviño and the Minister of Foreign Affairs José Manuel Albares. The Sultan of Oman Haitham bin Tariq was represented by his personal representative and Deputy PM Asa'ad bin Tariq Al Said.
Ursula von der Leyen	European Union	President of the European Commission	9–10 September	New Delhi	2023 G20 New Delhi summit	
Charles Michel	European Union	President of the European Council	9–10 September	New Delhi	2023 G20 New Delhi summit	
Olaf Scholz	Germany	Chancellor	9–10 September	New Delhi	2023 G20 New Delhi summit	
Fumio Kishida	Japan	Prime Minister	9–10 September	New Delhi	2023 G20 New Delhi summit	
Rishi Sunak	United Kingdom	Prime Minister	9–10 September	New Delhi	2023 G20 New Delhi summit	
Emmanuel Macron	France	President	9–10 September	New Delhi	2023 G20 New Delhi summit	
Giorgia Meloni	Italy	Prime Minister	9–10 September	New Delhi	2023 G20 New Delhi summit	
Justin Trudeau	Canada	Prime Minister	9–10 September	New Delhi	2023 G20 New Delhi summit	
Luiz Inácio Lula da Silva	Brazil	President	9–10 September	New Delhi	2023 G20 New Delhi summit	
Yoon Suk-yeol	South Korea	President	9–10 September	New Delhi	2023 G20 New Delhi summit	
Anthony Albanese	Australia	Prime Minister	9–10 September	New Delhi	2023 G20 New Delhi summit	
Joko Widodo	Indonesia	President	9–10 September	New Delhi	2023 G20 New Delhi summit	
Alberto Fernández	Argentina	President	9–10 September	New Delhi	2023 G20 New Delhi summit	
Recep Tayyip Erdoğan	Turkey	President	9–10 September	New Delhi	2023 G20 New Delhi summit	
Cyril Ramaphosa	South Africa	President	9–10 September	New Delhi	2023 G20 New Delhi summit	
Li Qiang	China	Premier	9–10 September	New Delhi	2023 G20 New Delhi summit	
Mohamed bin Zayed al Nayhan	United Arab Emirates	President	9–10 September	New Delhi	2023 G20 New Delhi summit	
Abdel Fattah el-Sisi	Egypt	President	9–10 September	New Delhi	2023 G20 New Delhi summit	
Lee Hsien Loong	Singapore	Prime Minister	9–10 September	New Delhi	2023 G20 New Delhi summit	
Bola Tinubu	Nigeria	President	9–10 September	New Delhi	2023 G20 New Delhi summit	
Mark Rutte	Netherlands	Prime Minister	9–10 September	New Delhi	2023 G20 New Delhi summit	
Sheikh Hasina	Bangladesh	Prime Minister	9–10 September	New Delhi	2023 G20 New Delhi summit	
Pravind Kumar Jugnauth	Mauritius	Prime Minister	9–10 September	New Delhi	2023 G20 New Delhi summit	
Azali Assoumani	Comoros	President, Chairperson of the African Union	9–10 September	New Delhi	2023 G20 New Delhi summit	
Mohammed bin Salman	Saudi Arabia	Crown Prince, Prime Minister	9–11 September	New Delhi	2023 G20 New Delhi summit, State Visit	Details Crown Prince Mohammed bin Salman attended the G20 Summit in New Delhi and stayed on for a State Visit. Second visit to India in his role as Crown Prince and de facto ruler of Saudi Arabia, the first being in February 2019.
Samia Suluhu Hassan	Tanzania	President	8–10 October	New Delhi	State Visit	First visit by President Hassan to India and the first Presidential visit from Tanzania in more than 8 years.
William Ruto	Kenya	President	4–6 December	New Delhi	State Visit	First visit by President Ruto to India, and the first Presidential visit from Kenya in more than 6 years.
Haitham bin Tariq	Oman	Sultan	16 December	New Delhi	State Visit	Details First visit of Sultan Haitham bin Tariq to India since assuming the title in 2020. First visit by a Sultan of Oman to India in 23 years.

== 2024 ==
Name	Country	Designation	Date(s)	Places visited	Type/Purpose of visit	Notes
Mohamed bin Zayed al Nayhan	United Arab Emirates	President	9–10 January	Gandhinagar	Attending the 2024 Vibrant Gujarat Global Summit	Details Chief Guest of the 2024 Vibrant Gujarat Global Summit. This was Sheikh al Nayhan's 5th visit to India in the last eight years.
Petr Fiala	Czech Republic	Prime Minister	9–11 January	Gandhinagar	Attending the 2024 Vibrant Gujarat Global Summit	
José Ramos-Horta	Timor Leste	President	8–10 January	Gandhinagar	Attending the 2024 Vibrant Gujarat Global Summit	
Filipe Jacinto Nyusi	Mozambique	President	9 January	Gandhinagar	Attending the 2024 Vibrant Gujarat Global Summit	
Emmanuel Macron	France	President	25–26 January	New Delhi	State visit, 75th Republic Day parade	
Kyriakos Mitsotakis	Greece	Prime Minister	21–22 February	New Delhi, Mumbai	State visit, Raisina Dialogue 2024	Details PM Mitsotakis was the chief guest and keynote speaker at the 2024 Raisina Dialogue. This was the first Head of State or Government-level visit from Greece to India in 15 years.
Tshering Tobgay	Bhutan	Prime Minister	14–18 March	New Delhi, Mumbai	Official visit	Details First overseas visit by PM Tobgay since assuming office in January 2024.
Ranil Wickremesinghe	Sri Lanka	President	9 June	New Delhi	Third oath of office ceremony of Prime Minister Modi	Seychelles was represented by Vice-President Ahmed Afif.
Mohamed Muizzu	Maldives	President	9 June	New Delhi	Third oath of office ceremony of Prime Minister Modi	Seychelles was represented by Vice-President Ahmed Afif.
Sheikh Hasina	Bangladesh	Prime Minister	9 June	New Delhi	Third oath of office ceremony of Prime Minister Modi	Seychelles was represented by Vice-President Ahmed Afif.
Pravind Kumar Jugnauth	Mauritius	Prime Minister	9 June	New Delhi	Third oath of office ceremony of Prime Minister Modi	Seychelles was represented by Vice-President Ahmed Afif.
Pushpa Kamal Dahal	Nepal	Prime Minister	9 June	New Delhi	Third oath of office ceremony of Prime Minister Modi	Seychelles was represented by Vice-President Ahmed Afif.
Tshering Tobgay	Bhutan	Prime Minister	9 June	New Delhi	Third oath of office ceremony of Prime Minister Modi	Seychelles was represented by Vice-President Ahmed Afif.
Sheikh Hasina	Bangladesh	Prime Minister	21–22 June	New Delhi	State Visit	Details First incoming bilateral visit following the 18th Lok Sabha elections.
Phạm Minh Chính	Vietnam	Prime Minister	30 July–1 August	New Delhi	State Visit	Details Despite being the de jure head of government, the prime minister is de facto only the third most important political position in Vietnam, behind the General Secretary of the Communist Party of Vietnam and the president of Vietnam.
Anwar Ibrahim	Malaysia	Prime Minister	19–21 August	New Delhi	State Visit	First visit by PM Ibrahim to India.
Andrew Holness	Jamaica	Prime Minister	30 September–3 October	New Delhi	Official Visit	Details First bilateral visit by a Jamaican Prime Minister to India.
Mohamed Muizzu	Maldives	President	6–10 October	New Delhi, Mumbai, Bengaluru	State Visit	First bilateral visit by President Muizzu to India.
Olaf Scholz	Germany	Chancellor	24–26 October	New Delhi, Goa	Official visit	Details Chancellor Scholz and PM Modi co-chaired the 7th India-Germany Intergovernmental Consultations. Both leaders also addressed the 18th Asia Pacific Conference of German Business (APK) in New Delhi. Chancellor Scholz then travelled to Goa where German naval ships were making a port call.
Pedro Sánchez	Spain	Prime Minister	27–29 October	New Delhi, Vadodara, Mumbai	Official Visit	Details First visit by a Prime Minister of Spain to India in 18 years. PM Modi and PM Sanchez inaugurate the Final Assembly Line Plant of C295 aircraft at Vadodara, set up by Tata Advanced Systems in collaboration with Airbus Spain.
Tshering Tobgay	Bhutan	Prime Minister	24–26 November	New Delhi	Working Visit	
Jigme Khesar Namgyel Wangchuck	Bhutan	King	5–6 December	New Delhi	Official Visit	Details Accompanied by the Queen of Bhutan Jetsun Pema.
Anura Kumara Disanayake	Sri Lanka	President	15–17 December	New Delhi, Bodh Gaya	State Visit	Details First overseas visit by President Disanayake after being elected president.

== 2025 ==
Name	Country	Designation	Date(s)	Places Visited	Type/Purpose of visit	Notes
Tharman Shanmugaratnam	Singapore	President	14–18 January	New Delhi, Bhubaneshwar	State Visit	
Prabowo Subianto	Indonesia	President	23–26 January	New Delhi	State Visit, 76th Republic Day parade	Details First visit by an Indonesian President to India in 8 years, the last one being in December 2016. President Subianto was the chief guest at the Republic Day parade.
Tamim bin Hamad Al Thani	Qatar	Emir	17–18 February	New Delhi	State Visit	Details Second state visit by the current Emir of Qatar to India, the first being in March 2015.
Tshering Tobgay	Bhutan	Prime Minister	20–21 February	New Delhi	Official Visit	Details Prime Minister Tobgay participated in the Leadership Conclave of the School of Ultimate Leadership (SOUL) alongside Prime Minister Modi. He also met with several ministers in the Indian government.
Ursula von der Leyen	European Union	President of the European Commission	27–28 February	New Delhi	Official Visit	Details President von der Leyen, on her third visit to India since assuming the Presidency of the European Commission in December 2019, was accompanied by 21 out of 27 members of the College of Commissioners (EU equivalent of an executive cabinet, one member from each of the 27 EU member states), the first visit of a large delegation of this kind to India. This was President von der Leyen's first overseas trip in her second term.
Christopher Luxon	New Zealand	Prime Minister	16–20 March	New Delhi, Mumbai	Official Visit, Raisina Dialogue 2025	Details First visit by a Kiwi PM to India in more than 8 years, the last one being in October 2016. PM Luxon was the chief guest at the 2025 Raisina Dialogue. During the visit, India and New Zealand announced the resumption of FTA talks.
Gabriel Boric	Chile	President	1–5 April	New Delhi, Agra, Mumbai, Bengaluru	State Visit	Details First visit by a Chilean President to India in 16 years, the previous one being in March 2009.
Jigme Khesar Namgyel Wangchuck	Bhutan	King	19 April	Assam	Informal Visit	Details King Wangchuck inspected the facilities at the newly inaugurated Inland Waterways Terminal and Multi Modal Logistics Park at Jogighopa on the Brahmaputra river in Assam, just 91 km from the town of Gelephu in Bhutan. This trade hub is expected to boost regional trade and provide a cost-effective route for Bhutanese exports to India and Bangladesh.
João Lourenço	Angola	President	2–4 May	New Delhi	State Visit	Details First visit by a President of Angola to India in 38 years.
Santiago Peña	Paraguay	President	2–4 June	New Delhi, Mumbai	State Visit	Details Only the second ever visit by a President of Paraguay to India, the first being in May 2012.
Bongbong Marcos	Philippines	President	4–8 August	New Delhi, Bengaluru	State Visit	Details First visit by a President of Philippines to India since President Rodrigo Duterte's visit in January 2018 for the Republic Day parade along with other ASEAN leaders. President Marcos was accompanied by First Lady Liza Araneta Marcos, several cabinet ministers and business representatives. The India–Philippines bilateral relationship was elevated to a Strategic Partnership.
Sitiveni Rabuka	Fiji	Prime Minister	24–26 August	New Delhi	Official Visit	Details Accompanied by spouse Sulueti Rabuka. Delivered a talk on ‘Ocean of Peace’ at the Indian Council of World Affairs.
Lawrence Wong	Singapore	Prime Minister	3–4 September	New Delhi	Official Visit	Details First visit by PM Wong to India since assuming the office of prime minister in May 2024. The visit commemorates 60 years of diplomatic ties between India and Singapore.
Tshering Tobgay	Bhutan	Prime Minister	3–6 September	Gaya, Rajgir, Ayodhya, New Delhi	Visit	Details PM Tobgay and his spouse Aum Tashi Doma accompanied the Je Khenpo, Jigme Chhoeda, for the consecration ceremony of the Royal Bhutan Temple in Rajgir. They also visited the Ram Temple in Ayodhya.
Navin Ramgoolam	Mauritius	Prime Minister	9–16 September	New Delhi, Ayodhya, Varanasi, Mumbai, Tirupati	State Visit	
Keir Starmer	United Kingdom	Prime Minister	8–9 October	Mumbai	Official visit	Details First visit by PM Starmer to India since becoming Prime Minister in July 2024. This visit followed PM Modi's visit to the UK in July 2025 during which a landmark India–UK trade deal was signed. PM Starmer was joined on the trip by more than 125 UK CEOs, entrepreneurs and university leaders, the largest such business and trade delegation from the UK to India. On the first day of the visit, PM Starmer visited Yash Raj Studios and a football showcase event attended by former England football legend Michael Owen and organized by the Premier League at the Cooperage Ground at Nariman Point. On the second day, PM Starmer met and held delegation level talks with PM Modi at the Raj Bhavan in Mumbai. He also held a CEO roundtable and addressed the 6th Global Fintech Fest at the Jio World Center in Mumbai.
Ukhnaagiin Khürelsükh	Mongolia	President	13–16 October	New Delhi	State visit	
Vladimir Putin	Russia	President	4–5 December	New Delhi	State visit, 23rd India–Russia Annual Summit	Details First visit by President Putin to India since the start of the Russia-Ukraine war in February 2022. He was accompanied by a large delegation of ministers and officials and including First Deputy Prime Minister Denis Manturov, Defence Minister Andrey Belousov, Finance Minister Anton Siluanov, Central Bank Governor Elvira Nabiullina, Foreign Policy Advisor Yuri Ushakov, Press Secretary Dmitry Peskov, as well as the Ministers of Agriculture, Economic Development, Health, Interior and Transport. The business and media delegation included the CEOs of Rosneft, Rosatom, Roscosmos, Sberbank, VTB Bank, Rosoboronexport and Transmashholding as well as Editor-in-chief of RT Margarita Simonyan. PM Modi greeted President Putin at Palam Airport and hosted him at his residence for a closed-door meeting followed by a dinner. The next day, following the ceremonial reception at Rashtrapati Bhavan and the laying of a wreath at Rajghat, the 23rd India–Russia Annual Summit was held at Hyderabad House. Later, President Putin inaugurated the RT India TV channel and attended the India–Russia Business Forum at Bharat Mandapam. The 28-hour state visit ending with a state banquet hosted by President Murmu at Rashtrapati Bhavan. Parallel to President Putin's state visit, Indian Defence Minister Rajnath Singh and Russian Defence Minister Andrey Belousov co-chaired the 22nd India–Russia Intergovernmental Commission on Military & Military-Technical Cooperation.

== 2026 ==
Name	Country/ Institution	Designation	Date(s)	Places visited	Type/Purpose of visit	Notes
Friedrich Merz	Germany	Chancellor	12–13 January	Ahmedabad, Bengaluru	Official visit	Details First official visit by Chancellor Merz to Asia. In Ahmedabad, Chancellor Merz visited the Sabarmati Ashram and the Adalaj Stepwell, participated in the Kite Festival, and held talks with PM Modi at Mahatma Mandir. Chancellor Merz then traveled to Bengaluru where he visited the Bosch campus in Adugodi, and the Centre for Nano Science and Engineering (CeNSE) at the Indian Institute of Science.
Mohamed bin Zayed Al Nahyan	United Arab Emirates	President	19 January	New Delhi	Official visit	
Ursula von der Leyen	European Union	President of the European Commission	24–27 January	New Delhi	State visit, 77th Republic Day parade, 16th EU–India Summit	Details First instance of EU leadership being chief guests for the Republic Day parade. During the EU–India Summit, the leaders adopted the EU–India Joint Comprehensive Strategic Agenda, announced the conclusion of FTA negotiations and formalized a Security and Defense Partnership.
António Costa	European Union	President of the European Council	24–27 January	New Delhi	State visit, 77th Republic Day parade, 16th EU–India Summit	Details First instance of EU leadership being chief guests for the Republic Day parade. During the EU–India Summit, the leaders adopted the EU–India Joint Comprehensive Strategic Agenda, announced the conclusion of FTA negotiations and formalized a Security and Defense Partnership.
Patrick Herminie	Seychelles	President	5–10 February	Chennai, Mumbai, New Delhi, Agra	State visit	
Emmanuel Macron	France	President	17–19 February	Mumbai, New Delhi	Official visit, AI Impact Summit	
Luiz Inácio Lula da Silva	Brazil	President	18–22 February	New Delhi	State visit, AI Impact Summit	
Pedro Sánchez	Spain	Prime Minister	17–20 February	New Delhi	AI Impact Summit	EU represented by executive VP of the European Commission Henna Virkkunen. UK represented by Deputy PM David Lammy. Sweden represented by Deputy PM Ebba Busch. UAE represented by Crown Prince of Abu Dhabi Khaled bin Mohamed Al Nahyan. Seychelles represented by VP Sebastien Pillay. Guyana represented by VP Bharrat Jagdeo. Bolivia represented by VP Edmand Lara.
Kyriakos Mitsotakis	Greece	Prime Minister	17–20 February	New Delhi	AI Impact Summit	EU represented by executive VP of the European Commission Henna Virkkunen. UK represented by Deputy PM David Lammy. Sweden represented by Deputy PM Ebba Busch. UAE represented by Crown Prince of Abu Dhabi Khaled bin Mohamed Al Nahyan. Seychelles represented by VP Sebastien Pillay. Guyana represented by VP Bharrat Jagdeo. Bolivia represented by VP Edmand Lara.
Dick Schoof	Netherlands	Prime Minister	17–20 February	New Delhi	AI Impact Summit	EU represented by executive VP of the European Commission Henna Virkkunen. UK represented by Deputy PM David Lammy. Sweden represented by Deputy PM Ebba Busch. UAE represented by Crown Prince of Abu Dhabi Khaled bin Mohamed Al Nahyan. Seychelles represented by VP Sebastien Pillay. Guyana represented by VP Bharrat Jagdeo. Bolivia represented by VP Edmand Lara.
Petteri Orpo	Finland	Prime Minister	17–20 February	New Delhi	AI Impact Summit	EU represented by executive VP of the European Commission Henna Virkkunen. UK represented by Deputy PM David Lammy. Sweden represented by Deputy PM Ebba Busch. UAE represented by Crown Prince of Abu Dhabi Khaled bin Mohamed Al Nahyan. Seychelles represented by VP Sebastien Pillay. Guyana represented by VP Bharrat Jagdeo. Bolivia represented by VP Edmand Lara.
Guy Parmelin	Switzerland	President	17–20 February	New Delhi	AI Impact Summit	EU represented by executive VP of the European Commission Henna Virkkunen. UK represented by Deputy PM David Lammy. Sweden represented by Deputy PM Ebba Busch. UAE represented by Crown Prince of Abu Dhabi Khaled bin Mohamed Al Nahyan. Seychelles represented by VP Sebastien Pillay. Guyana represented by VP Bharrat Jagdeo. Bolivia represented by VP Edmand Lara.
Alar Karis	Estonia	President	17–20 February	New Delhi	AI Impact Summit	EU represented by executive VP of the European Commission Henna Virkkunen. UK represented by Deputy PM David Lammy. Sweden represented by Deputy PM Ebba Busch. UAE represented by Crown Prince of Abu Dhabi Khaled bin Mohamed Al Nahyan. Seychelles represented by VP Sebastien Pillay. Guyana represented by VP Bharrat Jagdeo. Bolivia represented by VP Edmand Lara.
Andrej Plenković	Croatia	Prime Minister	17–20 February	New Delhi	AI Impact Summit	EU represented by executive VP of the European Commission Henna Virkkunen. UK represented by Deputy PM David Lammy. Sweden represented by Deputy PM Ebba Busch. UAE represented by Crown Prince of Abu Dhabi Khaled bin Mohamed Al Nahyan. Seychelles represented by VP Sebastien Pillay. Guyana represented by VP Bharrat Jagdeo. Bolivia represented by VP Edmand Lara.
Peter Pellegrini	Slovakia	President	17–20 February	New Delhi	AI Impact Summit	EU represented by executive VP of the European Commission Henna Virkkunen. UK represented by Deputy PM David Lammy. Sweden represented by Deputy PM Ebba Busch. UAE represented by Crown Prince of Abu Dhabi Khaled bin Mohamed Al Nahyan. Seychelles represented by VP Sebastien Pillay. Guyana represented by VP Bharrat Jagdeo. Bolivia represented by VP Edmand Lara.
Aleksandar Vučić	Serbia	President	17–20 February	New Delhi	AI Impact Summit	EU represented by executive VP of the European Commission Henna Virkkunen. UK represented by Deputy PM David Lammy. Sweden represented by Deputy PM Ebba Busch. UAE represented by Crown Prince of Abu Dhabi Khaled bin Mohamed Al Nahyan. Seychelles represented by VP Sebastien Pillay. Guyana represented by VP Bharrat Jagdeo. Bolivia represented by VP Edmand Lara.
Oljas Bektenov	Kazakhstan	Prime Minister	17–20 February	New Delhi	AI Impact Summit	EU represented by executive VP of the European Commission Henna Virkkunen. UK represented by Deputy PM David Lammy. Sweden represented by Deputy PM Ebba Busch. UAE represented by Crown Prince of Abu Dhabi Khaled bin Mohamed Al Nahyan. Seychelles represented by VP Sebastien Pillay. Guyana represented by VP Bharrat Jagdeo. Bolivia represented by VP Edmand Lara.
Anura Kumara Dissanayake	Sri Lanka	President	17–20 February	New Delhi	AI Impact Summit	EU represented by executive VP of the European Commission Henna Virkkunen. UK represented by Deputy PM David Lammy. Sweden represented by Deputy PM Ebba Busch. UAE represented by Crown Prince of Abu Dhabi Khaled bin Mohamed Al Nahyan. Seychelles represented by VP Sebastien Pillay. Guyana represented by VP Bharrat Jagdeo. Bolivia represented by VP Edmand Lara.
Navin Ramgoolam	Mauritius	Prime Minister	17–20 February	New Delhi	AI Impact Summit	EU represented by executive VP of the European Commission Henna Virkkunen. UK represented by Deputy PM David Lammy. Sweden represented by Deputy PM Ebba Busch. UAE represented by Crown Prince of Abu Dhabi Khaled bin Mohamed Al Nahyan. Seychelles represented by VP Sebastien Pillay. Guyana represented by VP Bharrat Jagdeo. Bolivia represented by VP Edmand Lara.
Tshering Tobgay	Bhutan	Prime Minister	17–20 February	New Delhi	AI Impact Summit	EU represented by executive VP of the European Commission Henna Virkkunen. UK represented by Deputy PM David Lammy. Sweden represented by Deputy PM Ebba Busch. UAE represented by Crown Prince of Abu Dhabi Khaled bin Mohamed Al Nahyan. Seychelles represented by VP Sebastien Pillay. Guyana represented by VP Bharrat Jagdeo. Bolivia represented by VP Edmand Lara.
Mark Carney	Canada	Prime Minister	27 February–2 March	Mumbai, New Delhi	Official visit	
Alexander Stubb	Finland	President	4–7 March	New Delhi, Mumbai	State visit, Raisina Dialogue 2026	
Christian Stocker	Austria	Chancellor	14–17 April	New Delhi	Official visit	
Lee Jae Myung	South Korea	President	19–21 April	New Delhi	State visit	
Tô Lâm	Vietnam	General Secretary, President	5–7 May	Bodh Gaya, New Delhi, Mumbai	State visit	
Nikos Christodoulides	Cyprus	President	20–23 May	Mumbai, New Delhi	State visit	
Tshering Tobgay	Bhutan	Prime Minister	25–26 May	Assam	Working visit	
Min Aung Hlaing	Myanmar	President	30 May–3 June	Bodh Gaya, New Delhi, Mumbai	Official visit	
Delcy Rodríguez	Venezuela	President	3–7 June	New Delhi, Jamnagar, Puttaparthi	Working visit	
Sanae Takaichi	Japan	Prime Minister	1–3 July	New Delhi	16th India–Japan Annual Summit	
Bart De Wever	Belgium	Prime Minister	2–4 September	New Delhi, Mumbai	Official visit	
Vladimir Putin	Russia	President	11–13 September	New Delhi	18th BRICS Summit	Leaders of full member countries
Xi Jinping	China	President	11–13 September	New Delhi	18th BRICS Summit	Leaders of full member countries
Cyril Ramaphosa	South Africa	President	11–13 September	New Delhi	18th BRICS Summit	Leaders of full member countries
Prabowo Subianto	Indonesia	President	11–13 September	New Delhi	18th BRICS Summit	Leaders of full member countries
Abdel Fattah El-Sisi	Egypt	President	11–13 September	New Delhi	18th BRICS Summit	Leaders of full member countries
Abiy Ahmed	Ethiopia	Prime Minister	11–13 September	New Delhi	18th BRICS Summit	Leaders of full member countries
Masoud Pezeshkian	Iran	President	11–13 September	New Delhi	18th BRICS Summit	Leaders of full member countries
Lê Minh Hưng	Vietnam	Prime Minister	11–13 September	New Delhi	18th BRICS Summit	Leaders of BRICS partner countries
Kassym-Jomart Tokayev	Kazakhstan	President	11–13 September	New Delhi	18th BRICS Summit	Leaders of BRICS partner countries
Anwar Ibrahim	Malaysia	Prime Minister	11–13 September	New Delhi	18th BRICS Summit	Leaders of BRICS partner countries
Bongbong Marcos	Philippines	President	11–13 September	New Delhi	18th BRICS Summit	Attended as chair of ASEAN
Evariste Ndayishimiye	Burundi	President	11–13 September	New Delhi	18th BRICS Summit	Attended as chair of the African Union
Guy Parmelin	Switzerland	President	5–7 October	New Delhi	State visit	Participated in the 2nd India–EFTA Prosperity Summit to mark the first anniversary of the India-EFTA Trade and Economic Partnership Agreement (TEPA) coming into force.
Donald Tusk	Poland	Prime Minister	21–23 October	New Delhi, Bengaluru	Official visit	
Alois	Liechtenstein	Hereditary Prince, Regent	25–28 October	New Delhi	State visit	Accompanied by Hereditary Princess Sophie. Alois is the acting Head of State since 2004.

== Expected future visits ==
Name	Country/ Institution	Designation	Date(s)	Places visited	Type/Purpose of visit	Notes
Balen Shah	Nepal	Prime Minister				

== Postponed visits ==
Name	Country	Designation	Date(s)	Places visited	Type/Purpose of visit	Notes
Donald Trump	United States	President	TBD	TBD	Quad Leaders' Summit	The Quad summit was expected to take place in India in the second half of 2025. This would be the 7th Quad summit overall, the 5th in-person, and the first to take place in India. However, due to prevailing diplomatic issues between India and the United States relating to trade and India's sourcing of Russian energy, the Quad summit was indefinitely postponed. The continued political instability in Japan (which peaked following the House of Councillors election in July 2025, PM Shigeru Ishiba's subsequent resignation, LDP's search for the new leader and PM Takaichi dissolving the House of Representatives and calling for snap elections in February 2026) may also have contributed to the summit being postponed.
Anthony Albanese	Australia	Prime Minister	TBD	TBD	Quad Leaders' Summit	
Sanae Takaichi	Japan	Prime Minister	TBD	TBD	Quad Leaders' Summit	

== See also ==
- Foreign relations of India
- List of chief guests at the Delhi Republic Day parade
- Raisina Dialogue
