= Gateway of India (disambiguation) =

Gateway of India is an arch-monument in Mumbai, India.

Gateway of India may also refer to:

- Gateway of India (film), a 1957 Hindi-language film
- Gateway of India Dialogue, geo-economic conference held in Mumbai, India

== See also ==
- India Gate, war memorial in New Delhi, India
