= Gateway of India Dialogue =

The Gateway of India Dialogue is a geo-economic conference held in Mumbai, India's financial and commercial capital. It is co-hosted by Ministry of External Affairs, India and the Gateway House: Indian Council on Global Relations. The conference name as well as its logo comes from Gateway of India, the famous monument of Mumbai.

It seeks to focus on bringing together geopolitics and business leaders under one roof. The inaugural edition was held on 13-14 June, 2016 and had participants from 20 countries. The objective is to make it a signature international conference, on the lines of Davos Forum.

== See also ==
- Raisina Dialogue
