= Raisina Dialogue =

Multilateral conference in New Delhi, India

- Status: Active
- Genre: Geopolitics
- Frequency: Annually
- Location: New Delhi
- Country: India
- Inaugurated: 1 March 2016; 10 years ago
- Founder: Observer Research Foundation
- Participants: Various
- Area: Global
- Patrons: Ministry of External Affairs, India
- Website: Official website

The Raisina Dialogue is a multilateral conference held annually in New Delhi, India, since 2016. The Raisina Dialogue has emerged as India's flagship conference on geopolitics and geo-economics. The conference is hosted by the Observer Research Foundation (ORF) in partnership with the Indian Ministry of External Affairs.

The name "Raisina Dialogue" comes from Raisina Hill, an elevation in New Delhi which is the seat of the Government of India.

== Origin and structure ==
The Raisina Dialogue was launched in 2016 by the Indian Ministry of External Affairs and the Indian think tank ORF, which was founded in 1990 with support from the Ambani family and Reliance Industries.

The conference is structured as a multi-stakeholder, cross-sectoral discussion, involving a variety of global policymakers including heads of states, governments and international organisations, ministers, high-ranking representatives of armed forces, among others. In addition, the Dialogue also welcomes major private sector executives, as well as members of the media and academia. It has been seen as an Indian attempt to rival the Munich Security Conference and Singapore's Shangri-La Dialogue.

It has since emerged as India's flagship conference on geopolitics and geo-economics, and specifically, on foreign policy.

== History ==
=== Raisina Dialogue 2016 ===
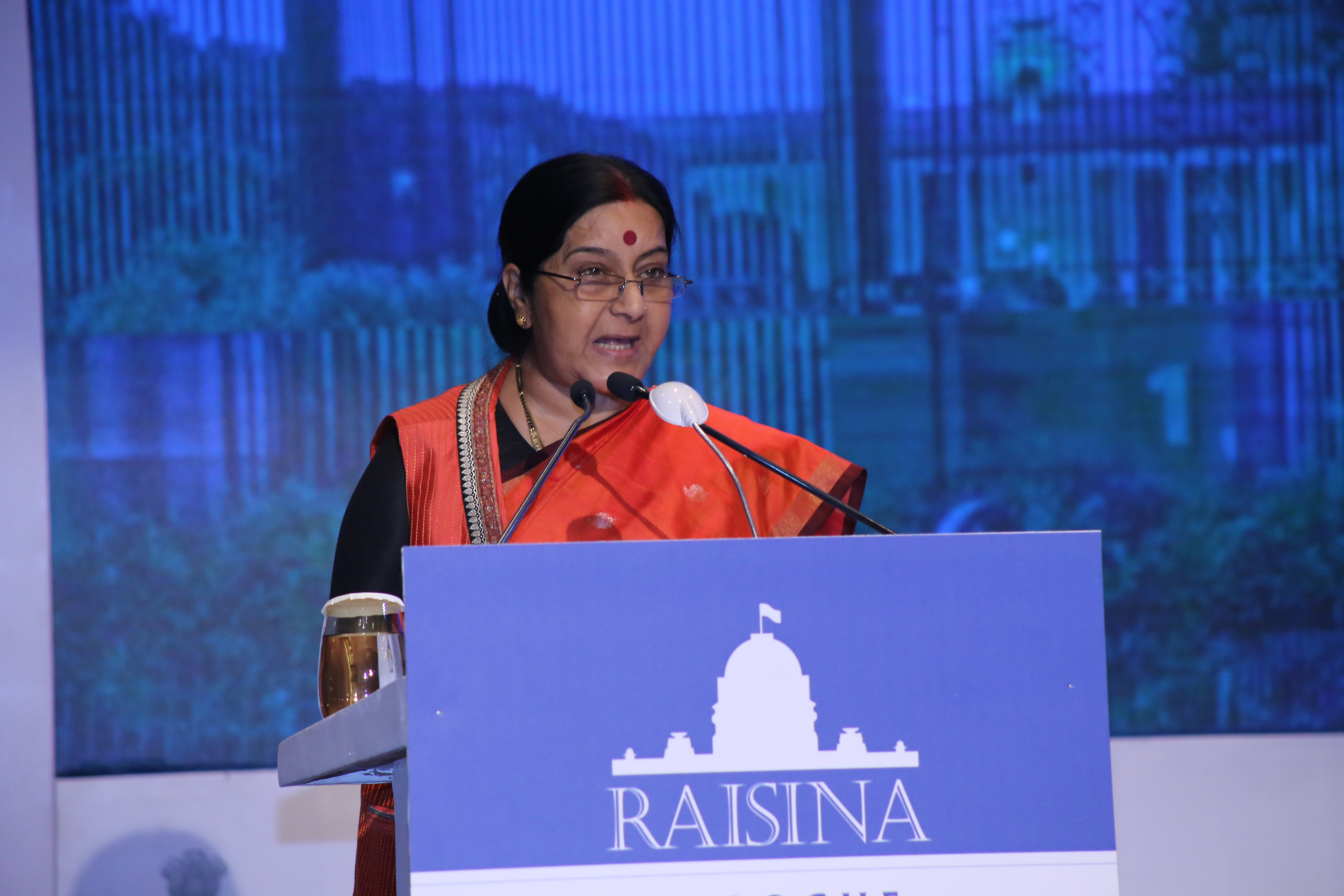
Minister of External Affairs, Sushma Swaraj during Raisina 2016

The first Raisina Dialogue was held from 1–3 March 2016. Over 100 speakers from over 35 countries attended to speak on the theme, "Asia: Regional and Global Connectivity".

=== Raisina Dialogue 2017 ===
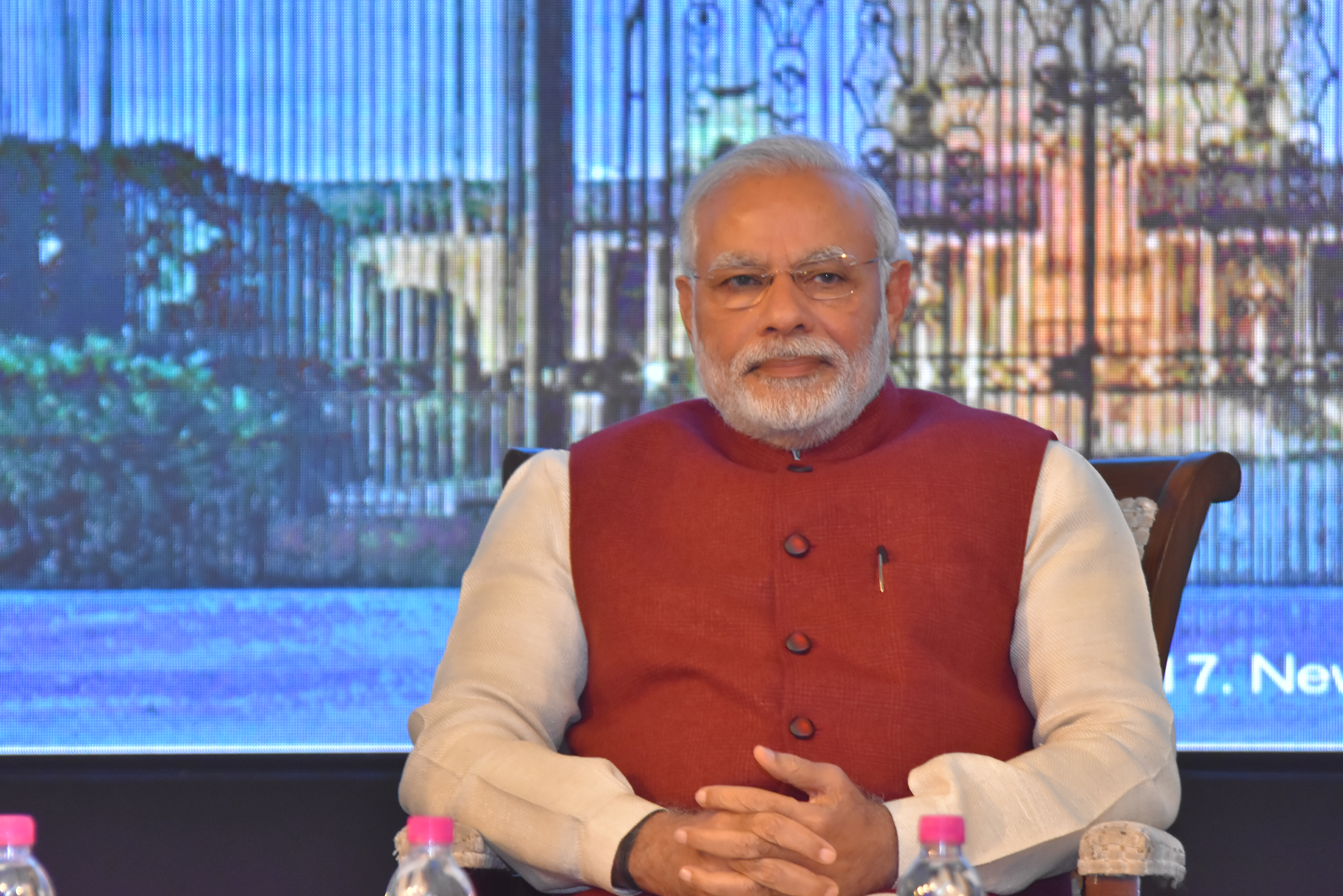
PM Modi during Raisina 2017

In 2017, The Dialogue was held from 17 to 19 January. Held on a larger scale, the conference welcomed over 120 speakers from 65 countries and upwards of 800 participants. Attendees discussed the theme, "The New Normal: Multilateralism with Multipolarity".

The Prime Minister of India, Narendra Modi, inaugurated the 2017 Raisina Dialogue. Other eminent speakers included the former President of Afghanistan, Hamid Karzai; the former Prime Minister of Canada, Stephen Harper; Nepal’s Minister of Foreign Affairs, Prakash Sharan Mahat; U.K.’s Secretary of State for Foreign & Commonwealth Affairs, Boris Johnson; the Diplomatic Adviser to the President of France, Jacques Audibert; Commander of U.S. Naval Forces, Europe and Africa, Admiral Michelle Howard; Commander of U.S. Pacific Command, Admiral Harry B. Harris Jr.; and the Indian Chief of the Army Staff, General Bipin Rawat.

=== Raisina Dialogue 2018 ===
The third Raisina Dialogue was held at the Taj Diplomatic Enclave in New Delhi, India from 16 to 18 January 2018. The theme for the 2018 Conference was "Managing Disruptive Transitions: Ideas, Institutions and Idioms".

=== Raisina Dialogue 2019 ===
The fourth Raisina Dialogue was held at the Taj Diplomatic Enclave in New Delhi, India from 8–10 January 2019. The theme for the conference was "New Geometrics | Fluid Partnerships | Uncertain Outcomes".

=== Raisina Dialogue 2020 ===
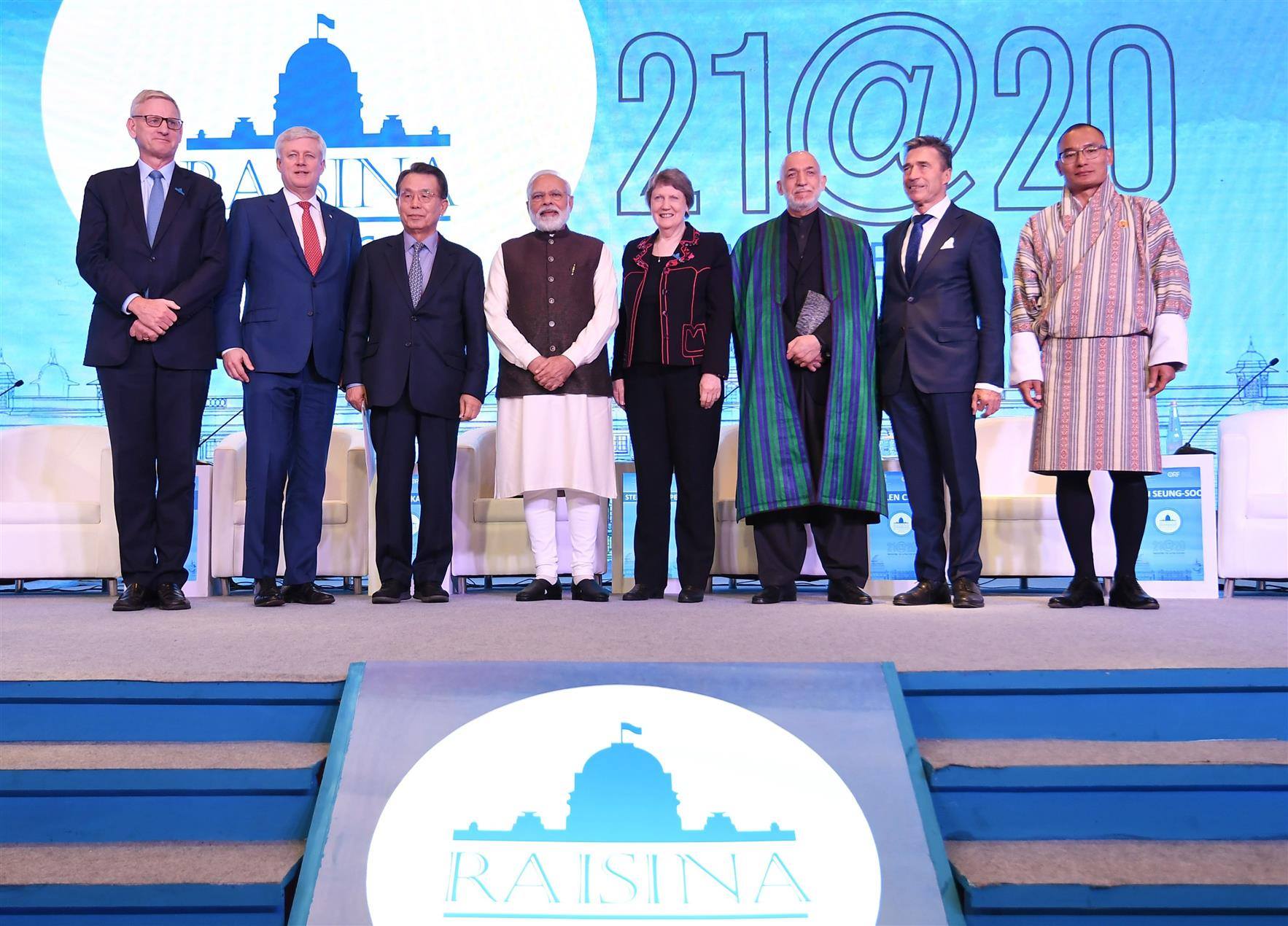
PM Modi with global leaders at inaugural session of Raisina Dialogue 2020 (14 January 2020)

The fifth Raisina Dialogue was held in New Delhi, India from 14 to 16 January. The theme for the 2020 Conference was "Navigating the Alpha Centurys". Australian Foreign Minister Marise Payne gave the keynote address.

=== Raisina Dialogue 2021 ===
The sixth Raisina Dialogue was held in virtual mode from 13 to 16 April 2021 due to the COVID-19 pandemic. The theme for 2021 was "ViralWorld: Outbreaks, Outliers and Out of Control". Danish prime minister Mette Frederiksen, Rwandan president Paul Kagame were the chief-guests present alongside Modi at the inaugural session.

=== Raisina Dialogue 2022 ===
The seventh Raisina Dialogue was held in-person in New Delhi from 25 April to 27 April 2022. The theme for 2022 was "Terra Nova: Impassioned, Impatient, and Imperilled".

=== Raisina Dialogue 2023 ===
The eighth Raisina Dialogue was held from 2 March to 4 March 2023. It focused on four pillars - Neo Insurgence, Amoral Mosaic, Chaotic Codes, Pernicious Passports, and Grey Rhinos. Prime Minister of Italy Giorgia Meloni was the chief guest.

=== Raisina Dialogue 2024 ===
The ninth Raisina Dialogue was held in New Delhi from 21 February to 23 February 2024. The theme for 2024 was “Chaturanga: Conflict, Contest, Cooperate, Create”. Prime Minister of Greece Kyriakos Mitsotakis was the chief guest. With a heavy European presence, the Russian invasion of Ukraine became a key topic of the conference, alongside discussions on handling an aggressive China.

=== Raisina Dialogue 2025 ===
The tenth Raisina Dialogue was held in New Delhi from 17 March to 19 March 2025. The theme for 2025 was “Kālachakra: People, Peace and Planet”. Christopher Luxon, the Prime Minister of New Zealand, was the chief guest and delivered the keynote address in the inaugural session. The event also featured Tulsi Gabbard, the United States Director of National Intelligence, alongside multiple other American intelligence officials.

=== Raisina Dialogue 2026 ===
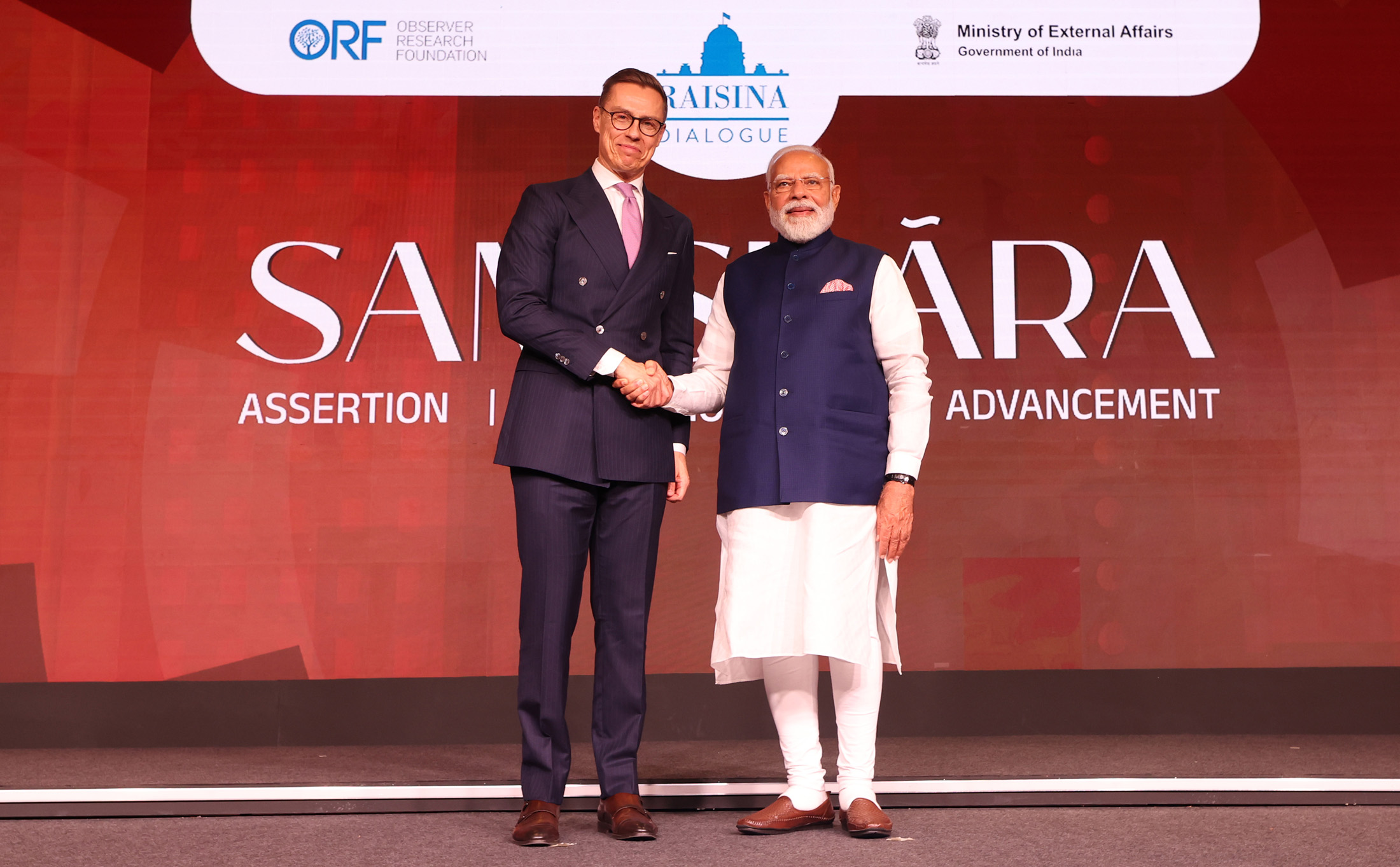
Prime Minister of India, Narendra Modi and the President of Finland, Alexander Stubb in 2026 Raisina Dialogue

The eleventh Raisina Dialogue was held in New Delhi from 5 March to 7 March 2026. The theme for 2026 is “Saṁskāra: Assertion, Accommodation, Advancement”.

== Publications ==
Each year, the Raisina Dialogue publishes a series of publications in order to ensure a continual dialogue of conference themes and highlights. Among these publications are The Raisina Files, which contain a set of commentaries authored by high-profile speakers and delegates.

Additionally, ORF publishes a Defence Primer and several policy reports to supplement the conversations held at each conference.

== See also ==
- Gateway of India Dialogue
- Halifax International Security Forum
- Munich Security Conference
- Shangri-La Dialogue
- Yalta European Strategy
