= List of basilicas in India =

This is the complete list of all the Basilicas in India. With 37 Indian churches officially designated a basilica by the Holy See of the Catholic Church in Rome, the Republic of India is the country with the most basilicas in Asia. The Basilica of Bom Jesus in Old Goa is the first church in India to be named a basilica, decreed by Pope Pius XII in 1946. Every pope since then has elevated at least one Indian church to the status of a basilica, except Pope John Paul I, owing to his brief leadership.

This map shows the locations of basilicas in India, except the states of Kerala and Tamil Nadu, and the union territory of Puducherry, all of which form the southern tip of India and together possesses 26 of the country's 37 basilicas (see below). The remaining 11 are scattered across the country as depicted.

A vast majority of India's basilicas are located in South India. Twenty-nine basilicas belong to the Latin Church, six to the Syro-Malabar Catholic Church, and one to the Syro-Malankara Catholic Church. Amongst the states of India, Kerala hosts the highest number of basilicas at 13, containing all of the seven Eastern Catholic basilicas, while Tamil Nadu ranks second with 11 basilicas, followed by Karnataka with four and the union territory of Pondicherry with two. All the remaining basilicas are the only ones in their respective states or union territories. Amongst the cities of India, Kerala's Kochi metroplitan area has the most basilicas (6), followed by Tamil Nadu's Chennai metropolitan area (3). The Roman Catholic Archdioceses of Verapoly and Madras–Mylapore, and the Syro Malabar Catholic Major Archeparchy of Ernakulam–Angamaly and Archeparchy of Changanacherry are the only catholic jurisdictions of India to host multiple basilicas (2 each).

Twenty-five of the basilicas are dedicated to Saint Mary. Four basilicas are dedicated to the Marian title of Our Lady of Good Health, (Note: Beside the Velankanni, Harihar and Besant Nagar basilicas, Our Lady of Good Health is also the patron of St. Mary's Basilica, Bengaluru.) followed by Our Lady of Lourdes, Our Lady of Snows, Our Lady of the Rosary, Our Lady of Mount Carmel, Our Lady of Graces and Assumption of Mary, all of which have two basilicas each. Our Lady of Dolours, Our Lady of Ransom, Our Lady of Peace, Our Lady of Perpetual Help, Immaculate Conception and Divine Motherhood have one basilica each. Saint Thomas the Apostle is the patron of two basilicas, both in Chennai—one being the place of his martyrdom and the other his burial. Saints Joseph, Andrew the Apostle, Sebastian, Lawrence, George, Anthony of Padua, Teresa of Avila, and John de Britto each have one basilica. Pondicherry's Sacred Heart Basilica is the only basilica in Asia dedicated to the Sacred Heart of Jesus.

== Background ==
The Basilica is a title given to certain Catholic churches. By canon law of the church, no church can be honoured with the title unless by an apostolic grant or from immemorial custom. The title is bestowed upon churches that are considered culturally significant, functioning as an important place of pilgrimage or for a specific devotion, such as to a saint or a Marian apparition. Basilicas in this canonical sense are divided into major ("greater") and minor basilicas. Today, only four churches, all in Rome, are classified as major basilicas: St. John Lateran, St. Peter, St, Paul outside the Walls, and St. Mary Major. The other canonical basilicas, including all the 36 basilicas in India, are minor basilicas.

== List ==
Sr. No.	Basilica	City/Locality, District	State	Ecclesiastical jurisdiction	Date of Designation	Particular church	Image
1	Basilica of Bom Jesus	Old Goa, Goa Velha, North Goa district	Goa	Roman Catholic Archdiocese of Goa and Daman	1946-01-11	Latin Church	
2	Basilica of Our Lady of the Mount (Mount Mary Church)	Bandra, Mumbai Suburban district	Maharashtra	Archdiocese of Bombay	1954-10-04	Latin Church	
3	National Shrine of St. Thomas Cathedral Basilica (San Thome Church)	Santhome, Mylapore, Chennai district	Tamil Nadu	Archdiocese of Madras-Mylapore	1956-03-16	Latin Church	
4	Basilica of Our Lady of Graces	Sardhana, Meerut district	Uttar Pradesh	Diocese of Meerut	1961-12-13	Latin Church	
5	Shrine Basilica of Our Lady of Good Health	Velankanni, Nagapattinam district	Tamil Nadu	Diocese of Tanjore	1962-11-03	Latin Church	
6	St Mary's Basilica	Shivajinagar, Bengaluru Urban district	Karnataka	Archdiocese of Bengaluru	1973-09-02	Latin Church	
7	St Mary's Syro-Malabar Cathedral Basilica	Ernakulam, Kochi, Ernakulam district	Kerala	Major Archeparchy of Ernakulam-Angamaly	1974-03-20	Syro-Malabar Church	
8	Basilica of Our Lady of Snows (Panimaya Madha Kovil)	Thoothukudi, Thoothukudi district	Tamil Nadu	Diocese of Tuticorin	1982-07-30	Latin Church	
9	Santa Cruz Cathedral Basilica (Kottepalli)	Fort Cochin, Kochi, Ernakulam district	Kerala	Diocese of Cochin	1984-08-23	Latin Church	
10	Basilica of the Holy Rosary	Bandel, Hooghly district	West Bengal	Archdiocese of Calcutta	1988-11-25	Latin Church	
11	Basilica of Our Lady of Dolours	Thrissur, Thrissur district	Kerala	Archeparchy of Thrissur	1992-04-25	Syro-Malabar Church	
12	Basilica of Our Lady of Lourdes (Poondi Madha Basilica)	Poondi–Alamelupuram, Thirukattupalli, Thanjavur district	Tamil Nadu	Diocese of Kumbakonam	1999-08-03	Latin Church	
13	Basilica of the Divine Motherhood of Our Lady	Ulatu, Ranchi district	Jharkhand	Roman Catholic Archdiocese of Ranchi	2004-11-30	Latin Church	
14	National Shrine Basilica of Our Lady of Ransom	Vallarpadam, Kochi, Ernakulam district	Kerala	Roman Catholic Archdiocese of Verapoly	2004-12-01	Latin Church	
15	Holy Redeemer's Basilica and Shrine of Our Lady of Perpetual Help	Palakkarai, Tiruchirapalli, Tiruchirappalli district	Tamil Nadu	Diocese of Tiruchirapalli	2006-10-12	Latin Church	
16	St. Mary, Queen of Peace Basilica	Palayam, Thiruvananthapuram, Thiruvananthapuram district	Kerala	Major Archeparchy of Thirvuvananthapuram	2008-10-13	Syro-Malankara Catholic Church	
17	Basilica of Our Lady of the Assumption (St. Mary's Church)	Secunderabad, Hyderabad district	Telangana	Archdiocese of Hyderabad	2008-11-07	Latin Church	
18	St. George's Basilica	Angamaly, Ernakulam district	Kerala	Major Archeparchy of Ernakulam-Angamaly	2009-06-24	Syro-Malabar Church	
19	St Andrew's Basilica and St. Sebastian's International Shrine	Arthunkal, Cherthala,Alappuzha district	Kerala	Diocese of Allepey	2010-07-09	Latin Church	
20	Basilica of the Sacred Heart of Jesus	Pondicherry, Puducherry district	Puducherry	Archdiocese of Pondicherry-Cuddalore	2011-06-24	Latin Church	
21	Basilica of Our Lady of Snows (Manjumatha Basilica)	Pallippuram, Ernakulam district	Kerala	Diocese of Kottapuram	2012-08-27	Latin Church	
22	St. Lawrence's Basilica	Attur, Karkala, Udupi district	Karnataka	Diocese of Udupi	2016-08-01	Latin Church	
23	St. Mary's Basilica (Valiyapalli)	Champakulam, Alappuzha district	Kerala	Archeparchy of Changanacherry	2016-11-27	Syro-Malabar Church	
24	Basilica of Our Lady of the Holy Rosary	Karumathampatti, Coimbatore district	Tamil Nadu	Diocese of Coimbatore	2019-07-22	Latin Church	
25	Basilica of Our Lady of Health	Harihar, Davanagere district	Karnataka	Diocese of Shimoga	2019-09-18	Latin Church	
26	St. Anthony's Basilica	Dornahalli, Mandya district	Karnataka	Diocese of Mysore	2019-10-17	Latin Church	
27	St. Mary's Basilica	Mulagumudu, Kanyakumari district	Tamil Nadu	Roman Catholic Diocese of Kuzhithurai	2020-06-09	Latin Church	
28	Basilica of Our Lady of Mount Carmel and St. Joseph	Varapuzha, Ernakulam district	Kerala	Roman Catholic Archdiocese of Verapoly	2020-12-11	Latin Church	
29	Basilica of Our Lady of Assumption	Kamanayakkanpatti, Thoothukudi district	Tamil Nadu	Diocese of Palayamkottai	2023-08-15	Latin Church	
30	Basilica of St. John de Britto	Oriyur, Ramanathapuram district	Tamil Nadu	Diocese of Sivagangai	2023-12-05	Latin Church	
31	St. Teresa's Shrine Basilica	Mahe, Mahe district	Puducherry	Archdiocese of Calicut	2024-02-24	Latin Church	
32	Mount Carmel Basilica	Munnar, Idukki district	Kerala	Diocese of Vijayapuram	2024-05-25	Latin Church	
33	Basilica of Our Lady of Divine Grace	Mokama, Patna district	Bihar	Archdiocese of Patna	2025-01-24	Latin Church	
34	Basilica of Our Lady of Lourdes	Chemperi, Kannur district	Kerala	Archeparchy of Tellicherry	2024-08-14	Syro-Malabar Church	
35	St. Thomas Mount National Shrine Basilica	Parangimalai, St. Thomas Mount, Chengalpattu district	Tamil Nadu	Diocese of Chingleput	2025-07-03	Latin Church	
36	Annai Velankanni Shrine Basilica (Little Velankanni)	Besant Nagar, Adyar, Chennai district	Tamil Nadu	Archdiocese of Madras-Mylapore	2026-09-21	Latin Church	
37	Marth Mariam Immaculate Conception Shrine Basilica (St. Mary's Pilgrim Church)	Parel, Changanassery, Kottayam district	Kerala	Archeparchy of Changanacherry	2026-11-21	Syro-Malabar Church	

== Maps ==
Locations of the 13 basilicas across the Indian state of Kerala and the Mahe district of Puducherry:
- Yellow dots indicate the Latin-rite Roman Catholic basilicas
- Red dots are the Syro-Malabar Catholic basilicas
- Black dot is the Syro-Malankara Catholic basilica
Locations of the 11 basilicas in Tamil Nadu and Pondicherry

== See also ==
- List of cathedrals in India
- Roman Catholicism in India
- List of Roman Catholic dioceses in India
- List of Catholic bishops of India
- List of Catholic Churches in India
