= Marth Mariam Immaculate Conception Shrine Basilica =

- Location: Parel, Changanassery, Kerala
- Country: India
- Denomination: [Eastern Catholic]
- Sui iuris church: Syro-Malabar Church

History
- Status: Minor basilica
- Founded: 1904
- Dedication: Immaculate Conception of the Blessed Virgin Mary

Architecture
- Functional status: Active

Administration
- Archdiocese: Syro-Malabar Catholic Archeparchy of Changanassery

Marth Mariam Immaculate Conception Shrine Basilica, also known as St. Mary’s Pilgrim Church, Parel or Parel Marian Pilgrimage Centre, is a Syro-Malabar Catholic and Marian pilgrimage centre located at Parel, Changanassery, in Kottayam district, Kerala, India. It is under the jurisdiction of the Syro-Malabar Catholic Archeparchy of Changanassery.

The church was established in 1904, during the golden jubilee celebrations of the proclamation of the Catholic dogma of the Immaculate Conception. It was founded under the direction of Archbishop Mathew Makil, with Vicar General Father Cyriac Kandankary associated with its establishment.The church was initially established as a common Marian pilgrim centre for entire Changancherry including Pala and other diocese. The church became popularly known as Parel Church because it was built on a rocky elevation.The permission for same was given by HH Maharaja of Travancore on his way to Thekkady.

The foundation stone for the existing church building was laid in 1972 by Archbishop Antony Padiyara, who also consecrated it in 1974. The church was designated a pastoral centre in 1977 and became an independent parish in 1981.

As the number of pilgrims increased, the archdiocese undertook the construction of a new church complex. The new structure, spread over three levels, was designed to accommodate the growing number of worshippers and pilgrims. The newly built church complex is filled with Syrian Orthodox icons,entirely avoiding any form of idol or statue worshipping, except for the 100 year old Marth Mariam statue brought from France.

In October 2026, the Vatican elevated the Parel Marian Pilgrimage Centre to the status of a minor basilica, with the approval of Pope Leo XIV. The designation was granted by the Dicastery for Divine Worship and the Discipline of the Sacraments. The shrine was given the name Marth Mariam Immaculate Conception Shrine Basilica. Its formal announcement was scheduled to coincide with the consecration of the new church on 21 November 2026. It became the second basilica under the Archeparchy of Changanassery, after St Mary's Basilica at Champakulam.Church becomes second basilica in Changanassery archdiocese, which descends directly from the Marth Mariam Cathedral Niranam (now managed by Malankara Orthodox Syrian Church),found by St Thomas the apostle.

== See also ==
- List of basilicas in India
