= St. Anthony's Basilica, Dornahalli =

- St. Anthony's Minor Basilica
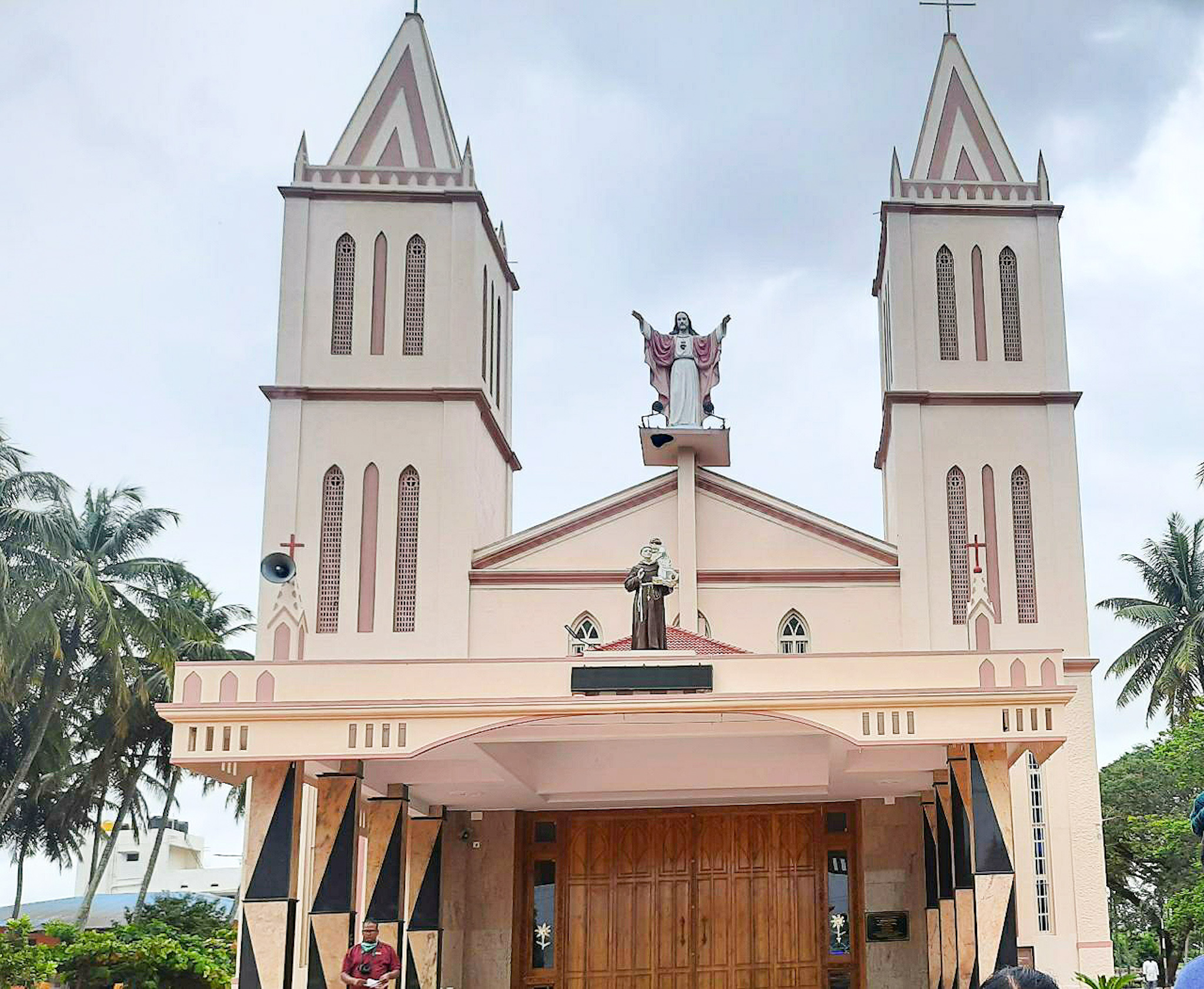
- St. Anthony's Basilica, Dornahalli
- 12.41060°N 76.42162°E
- Location: Dornahalli, Karnataka
- Country: India
- Denomination: Catholic
- Website: dornahallistantony.in

History
- Status: Basilica
- Dedication: St. Anthony of Padua

Architecture
- Functional status: Active

Administration
- Diocese: Mysore
- Deanery: Hunsur

St. Anthony's Basilica in Dornahalli, Karnataka is a Catholic shrine dedicated to St. Anthony of Padua.

Around 200 years ago, a farmer ploughing his field in Dornahalli unearthed a wooden statue of St. Anthony of Padua. the farmer built a small place of worship in honour of the saint. A large church was built at the site in the middle of 19th century and another in 1920. When this church was in a dilapidated condition, it was demolished and rebuilt in 1969. However, the facade from the 1920 church was renovated and retained. This church in the shape of a Tau (English alphabet T) cross and can accommodate a thousand people. It also houses a small relic of St. Anthony brought from Italy.

Pope Francis granted the title of Minor Basilica to the shrine through a decree dated 17 October 2019.

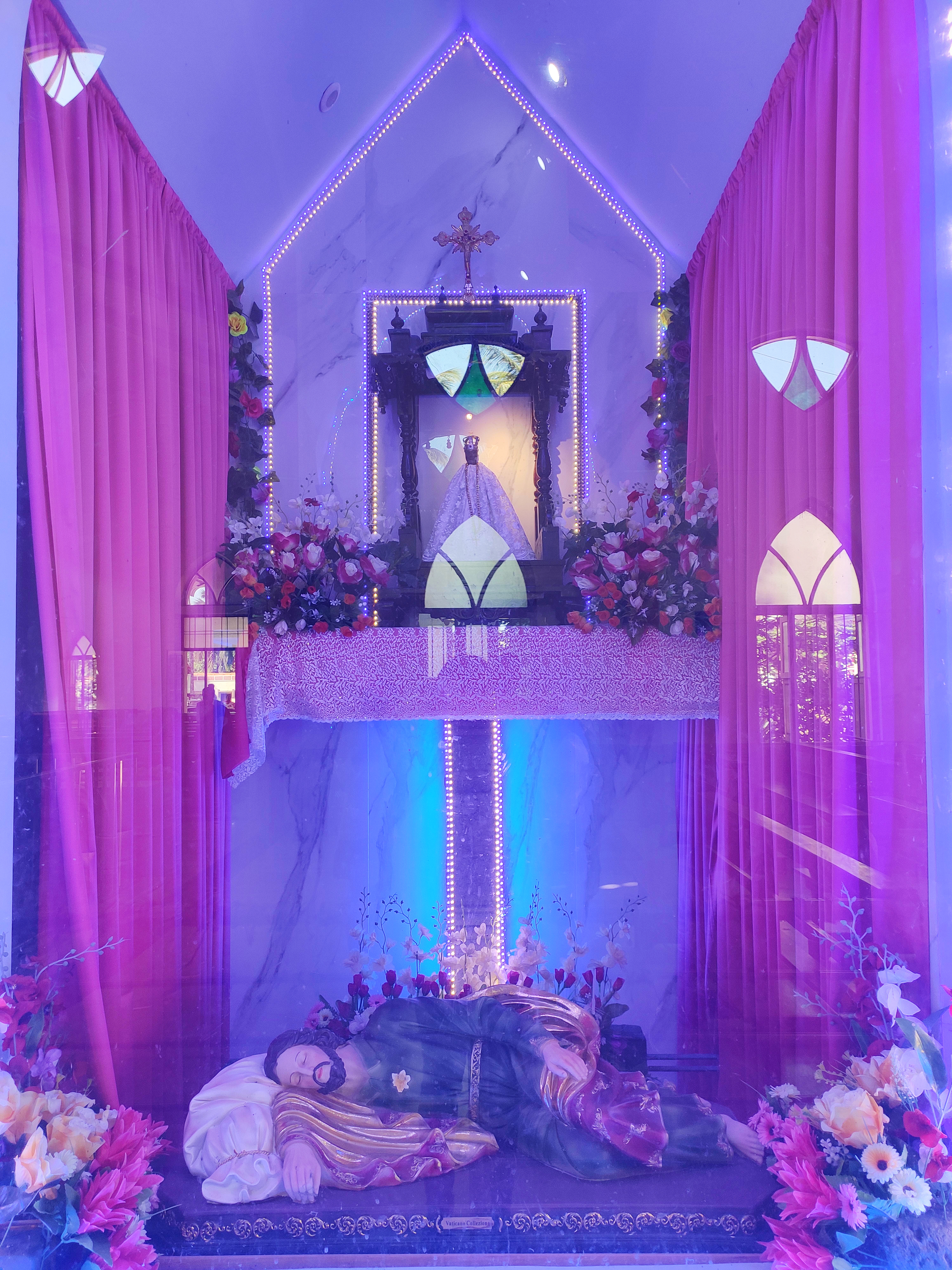
