= Basilica of Our Lady of Health, Harihar =

Basilica of Our Lady of Health
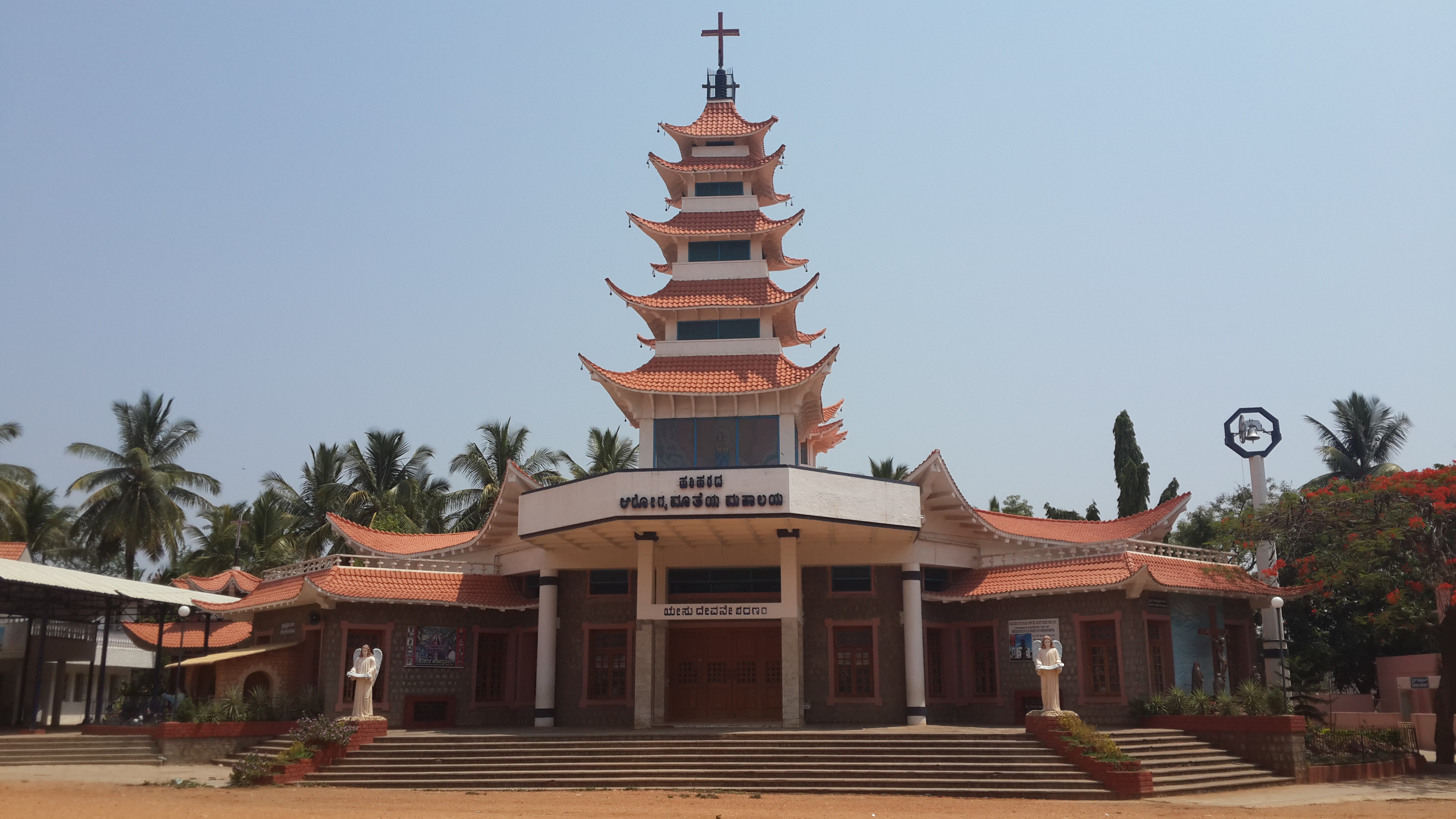
- Basilica of Our Lady of Health
- 14.51075°N 75.810673°E
- Country: India
- Denomination: Catholic
- Website: www.hariharshrine.org

History
- Status: Basilica

Architecture
- Functional status: Active

Administration
- Diocese: Shimoga

Clergy
- Archbishop: Peter Machado
- Bishop: Francis Serrao
- Rector: Fr. Antony peter

The Basilica of Our Lady of Health located in Harihar in India is a pilgrimage centre dedicated to Our Lady of Health.

The Shrine has been frequented by the people irrespective of caste, language and religion. Thousands of pilgrims come to this Shrine during the festivities in August–September. The Annual Feast of the Shrine is on 8 September, the Feast of the Nativity of the Blessed Virgin Mary. In 2018, 200,000 devotees attended the feast celebrations.

The shrine has been called as the 'Vailankanni of Karnataka'. Several miracles are reported to have occurred here.

== History ==
Christianity has a long history in the state of Karnataka. The history of this shrine dates back to the 18th century. A new church dedicated to Our Lady of Health was built on 31 August 1992. On 27 May 2012, the shrine was officially declared as a Diocesan Shrine of the Diocese of Shimoga.

== Elevation to minor basilica ==
After careful consideration and proper scrutiny, the Vatican has raised the Shrine of Our Lady of Health, Harihar to the status of a Minor Basilica on 18 September 2019. This is the third shrine in Karnataka to have received the status of Minor Basilica after St. Mary's Minor Basilica in the Archdiocese of Bangalore and St. Lawrence Minor Basilica in the Diocese of Udupi. The official celebration of this milestone was held on 15 January 2020.

== See also ==
- Basilica of Our Lady of Good Health, Velankanni
- Basilica of Our Lady of Ransom, Vallarpadam
