= Mount Carmel Church, Munnar =

Catholic church in Munnar, India

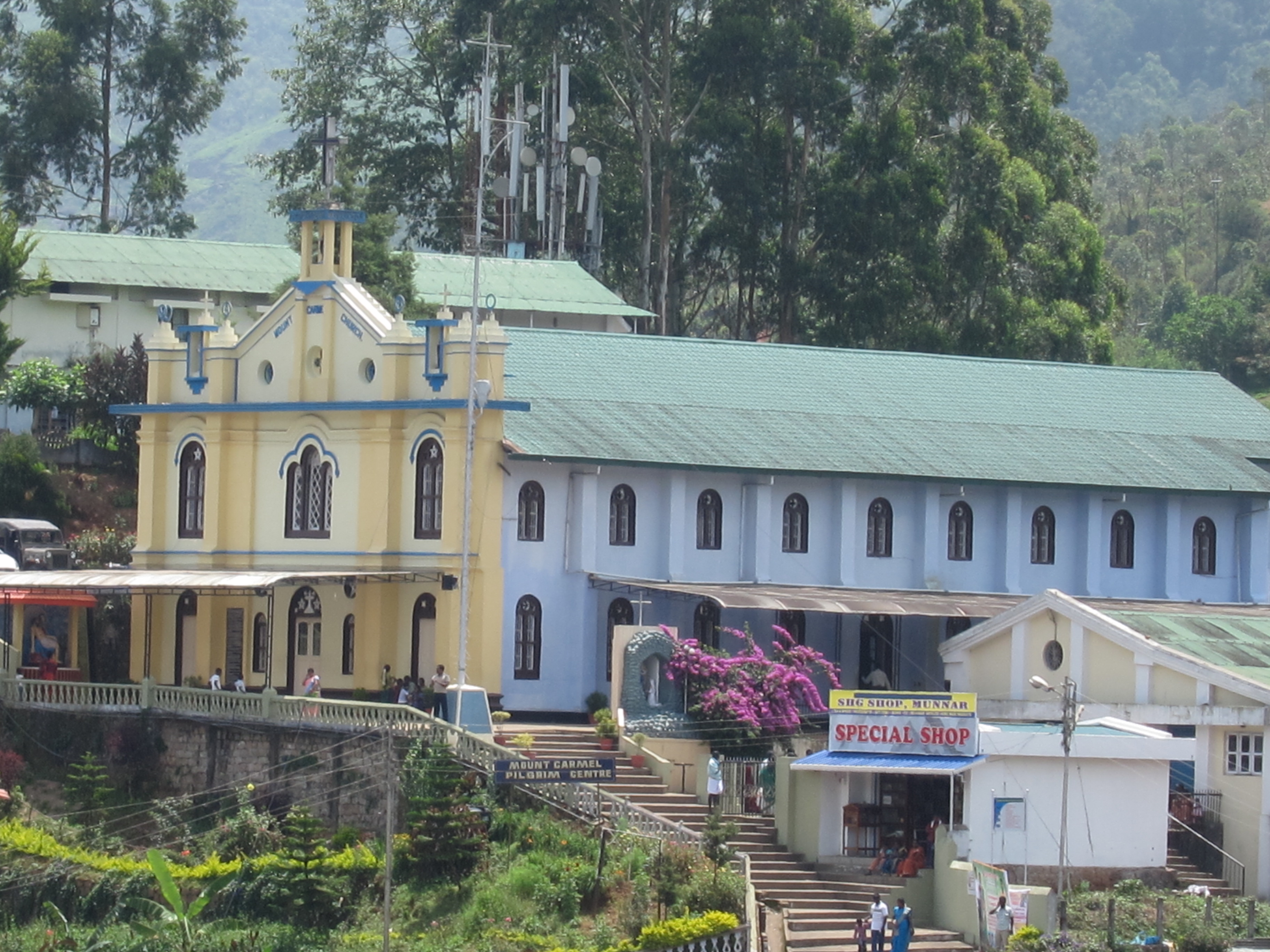

- Location within Kerala
- 10.0881625°N 77.0590323°E
- Location: Munnar
- Country: India
- Denomination: Catholic Church
- Sui iuris church: Latin Church

History
- Status: Basilica
- Founded: 1898
- Founder(s): Fr. Alfonse Maria De Los Angeles, OCD
- Consecrated: 25 May 2024

Architecture
- Functional status: Active

Administration
- Diocese: Vijayapuram

Clergy
- Rector: Very. Rev. Fr. Michael Valainchyil

The Mount Carmel Basilica of Munnar is a Catholic basilica and pilgrimage centre in the plantation town of Munnar, in the southern Indian state of Kerala. The church is known for its wood-framed windows and a statue of Christ and the Virgin Mary.

== History ==
The church was started in a shed in 1898 by a Spanish priest, Fr. Alfonse Maria De Los Angeles, OCD on land given by the management of tea estates. The church was set up for catering religious needs of the plantation workers, who mostly came from neighbouring Madras Presidency (now Tamil Nadu) and Southern Travancore (nowadays Kanyakumari district of Tamil Nadu). The present structure of the church was constructed in 1909. Fr. Alphonse was buried inside the church in 1916 after he succumbed to malaria.

On 21 January 1934, the foundation stone of a new church in Munnar was laid, and the present church was blessed on 17 April 1938, by Bonaventure Arana, OCD, the first bishop of Vijayapuram. On 5 February 1943, the Munnar community was raised to the status of a parish. The 125th anniversary of the church was celebrated in 2022.

On 27 March 2024, it was announced that the church had been conferred the status of a minor basilica by Pope Francis. The ceremony for the elevation is planned for 25 May 2024.

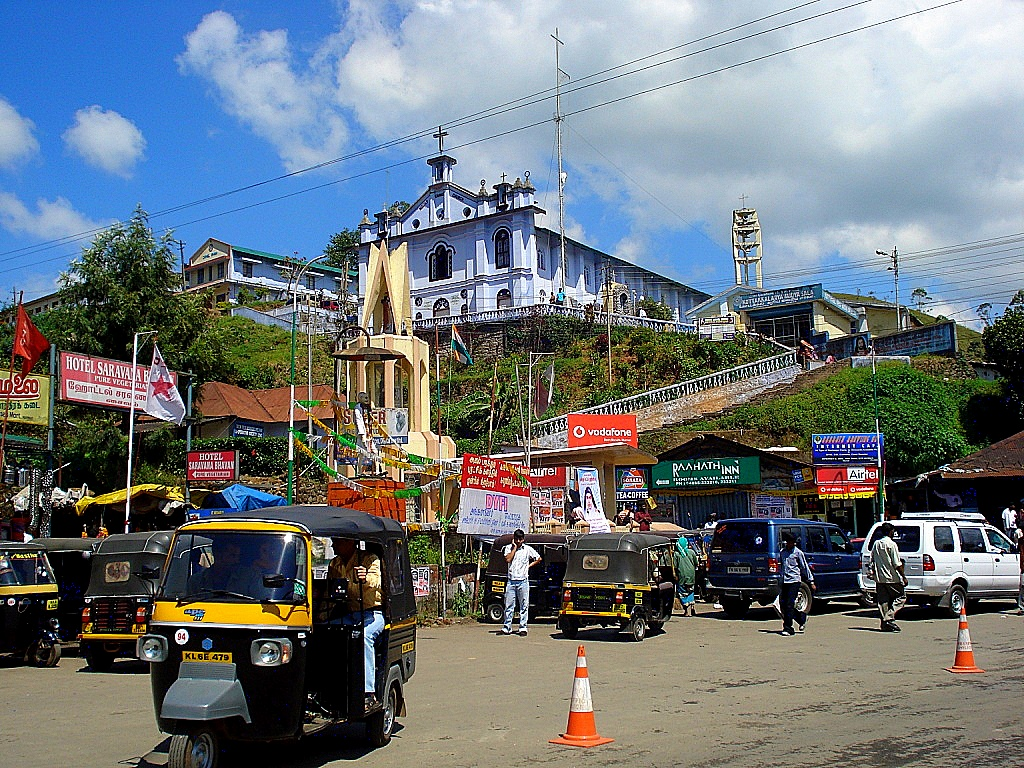
Mount Carmel Church and State Highway 17.
