= Basilica of St. Mary, Champakulam =

Christian Church in Kerala, India

St. Mary's Syro Malabar Catholic Basilica Church (Valiya Palli, Kerala)
- Champakulam Kalloorkadu Marth Maryam
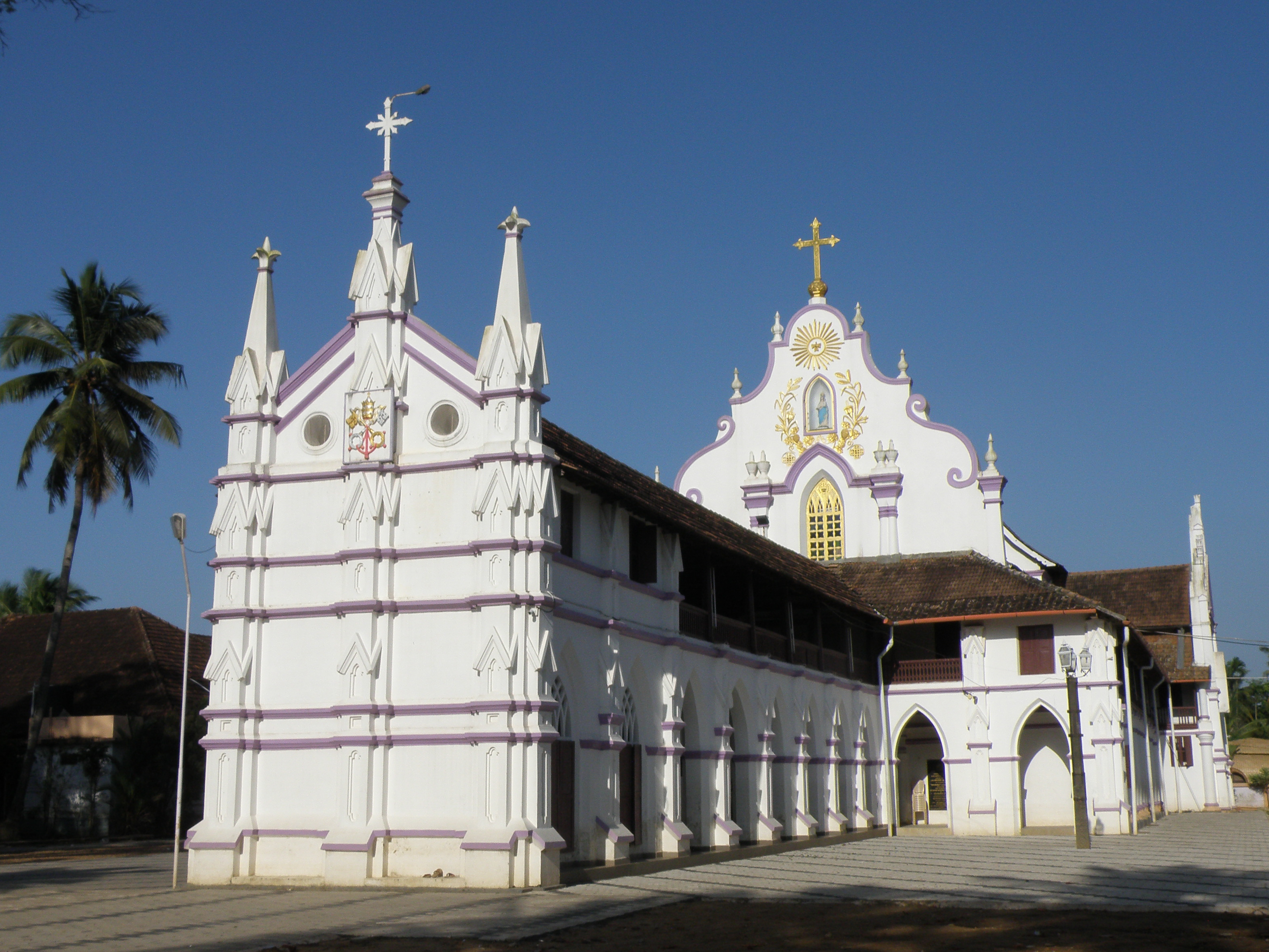
- Champakulam St. Mary's Syro-Malabar Catholic Basilica Church (Kalloorkkadu Valiya Palli).

Religion
- Affiliation: Syro-Malabar Church
- District: Alappuzha District
- Ecclesiastical or organisational status: Minor Basilica
- Leadership: Bishop: Mar Thomas Tharayil, Archdiocese: Changanassery
- Year consecrated: AD 427

Location
- Location: Champakulam, Alappuzha, Kerala, India
- Country: India
- Interactive map of St. Mary's Syro Malabar Catholic Basilica Church (Valiya Palli, Kerala)
- Coordinates: 9°24′33″N 76°24′40″E

Website
- http://champakulampally.com/

Champakulam Kalloorkadu St. Mary's Syro Malabar Catholic Basilica Church (Malayalam: ചമ്പക്കുളം മർത്ത് മറിയം സുറിയാനി മലബാർ കത്തോലിക്കാ വലിയ പള്ളി) is an ancient Christian Church in Kerala. It belongs to the Syro-Malabar Church under the Archeparchy of Changanacherry. Established in 4CE, It is the Mother Church (Ammappalli) of all the Syrian Churches of Central Travancore.

== History ==
Champakulam Kalloorkadu St. Mary's Basilica (also called Champakulam Valia Palli) is one of the oldest Christian churches in India and the mother church of almost all Catholic Syrian churches in central Travancore. Believed to be established in AD 427, the church was rebuilt many times. Champakulam church was once under Niranam Church, which was founded by the Apostle Saint Thomas himself. The many rock inscriptions found around the church tell us about the history of the church.

The open air Rock Cross at Champakulam church is one of the most ancient crosses with clear documentation of its antiquity, dating to AD 1151. There are many archaeological artifacts found around the church that tell more about its history. Champakulam Church had very friendly relations with the Puthenkoottukar and had a pivotal role in many ecumenical efforts in the eighteenth century. Ikkako Kathanar, one of the martyrs (nasranis) of East Syriac Catholics, was born in this parish.

Champakulam church has been recognized by the Universal Church as a Basilica. On 27 November 2016, the church was officially declared as a basilica by Pope Francis and Mar Joseph Perumthottam, the Metropolitan Archbishop of Changanacherry. This is the first basilica in the archdiocese of Changanasserry, the fourth in the Syro Malabar Church, the ninth in Kerala and the twenty-third basilica in India.

Over the years, the church has undergone significant updates. Initially, there was a small parish hall with about hundred seats. A few years back, a bigger Parish Hall was constructed. The latest, inaugurated on 3 January 2011, has 800+ seats. St. Mary's Theological Center was inaugurated in 2011 as well.

== The Church At Glance ==
- Parish : Champakulam
- Forane : Champakulam
- Diocese : Changanacherry
- Patron : St. Mary
- First Church : AD 427
- Priests : 4
- Vicar :Very Rev. Fr. Gregory onamkulam
- Asst.Vicars: Fr. shibin mulavarickal CSsR and Fr.Tony puthiveetikalam
- Catholic Population : 6500
- Catholic Families : 1378
- Phone : 0477-2736252

=== Holy Qurbana Timings ===
- Sundays : 6.00AM, 7.30AM, 9.30AM, 4.00PM
- Other Days : 6.00AM, 7.00AM
- Wednesdays : 6.30AM, 4.00PM

=== Catholic Organizations ===
- C.M.L
- Altar Boys
- Thirubala sakhyam
- Yuva Deepti-S.M.Y.M
- Mathru Jyothis
- Pithru Vedi
- St. Vincent De Paul Society
- Darsana Smooham
- Choir Group

=== Location (Wikimapia) ===
- http://wikimapia.org/101750/Champakulam-Kaloorkadu-St-Mary-s-Forane-Church-AD-427

== Famous Parishioners ==
There are many famous parishioners in the history of Kalloorkadu church. One of them is the martyr of the church, Ikkako Kathanar.

=== Ikkako Kathanar ===
Ikkako Kathanar was a priest from this parish who became martyr in the hand of Portuguese for protecting the East Syriac tradition of the indigenous catholic church of India (Nasranis) mainly along the malabar coast. Till the arrival of Europeans Nasranis were belonging to the East Syriac rites in the Catholic Church. The Europeans under the Padroado and Propaganda tried to forcefully convert the nasranis into western or Latin rite. Ikkako Kathanar is one of the faithful of the church who tried to resist this illegal attempt which extended over more than five centuries. He attained martyrdom under the hands of propaganda carmelites during this.

== Annual Feasts ==
Apart from general Christian Holy celebrations like Christmas, Good Friday & Easter (Holy week) etc., there are two main yearly feasts (മലയാളം: പെരുന്നാള്‍).

=== Feast of Mother Mary / Marian apparition(ദര്‍ശനതിരുന്നാള്‍) ===
The Feast of the Apparition lasts for 11 days of pious celebrations and concludes on the Sunday following 15 October.

=== Commemoration of the Death of St. Joseph (യൌസേപ്പ് പിതാവിന്റെ മരണ തിരുന്നാള്‍) ===
This is a 'shradham- Chatham' conducted in commemoration of the death of St. Joseph is held on 19 March every year. It attracts thousands of devotees to Kalloorkadu Church from far of places.

Moonnu Noyambu Perunnaal of Champakulam

Champakulam Church is one of the ancient churches in which Moonnu Noyambu Perunnaal (Three day fast- Rogation of Ninevites) celebrated regularly which has been discontinued in the recent past. There are clear documentation about the Moonnu noyambu perunaal of champakulam in the records about the financial help and support from the Kings of Chempakasserry for the feast.

=== Parishes Under Champakulam Forane ===
1. Champakulam (Kalloorkad) St. Mary's Syro-Malabar Catholic Church 0477-2736252
2. Kondackal St. Joseph's Syro-Malabar Catholic Church 0477-2736216
3. Pullangady Holy Family Syro-Malabar Catholic Church 0477-2736346
4. Thekkekara St. John's Syro-Malabar Catholic Church 0477-2707031
5. Vadakkeamichakari St. George's Syro-Malabar Catholic Church 0477-2707075
6. Vaisyambhagam St. Antony's Syro-Malabar Catholic Church 0477-2736501
7. St. Joseph's Syro-Malabar Catholic Church, Chennamkary 0477-2724237
8. Kandankary St. Joseph's Syro-Malabar Catholic Church 0477-2737125
9. Narbonapuram St. Sebastian's Syro-Malabar Catholic Church 0477-2762205
10. Nazareth St. Jerome's Syro-Malabar Catholic Church 0477-2762205
11. Sleevapuram Syro-Malabar Catholic Church(Ponga) 0477-2762188
12. Chennamkary Lourdes Matha Syro-Malabar Catholic Church 0477-
13. Padaharam St.Joseph's Syro-Malabar Catholic Church

== Institutions under the Parish ==
=== Religious Houses In the Parish ===
- St.Martin Chapel
- Gagultha Ashram CMI
- SABS (The Congregation of the sisters of the Adoration of the Blessed Sacrament) Convent.
  - SABS was founded on 8 December 1908 at Champakulam in Kerala. It had its origin in the personal experience of the Eucharistic presence of the servant of God Thomas Kurialacherry (1873-1925) the first bishop of Changanacherry.
- Kurialasserry Bhavan (SABS)
- Clara madhom & Orphanage for young girls, Kondakkal.

=== Other institutions under the Parish ===
- St. Mary's LP School
- St. Mary's High School
- St. Mary's Higher Secondary School Champakulam
- St. Joseph's Mission Hospital

== Gallery ==
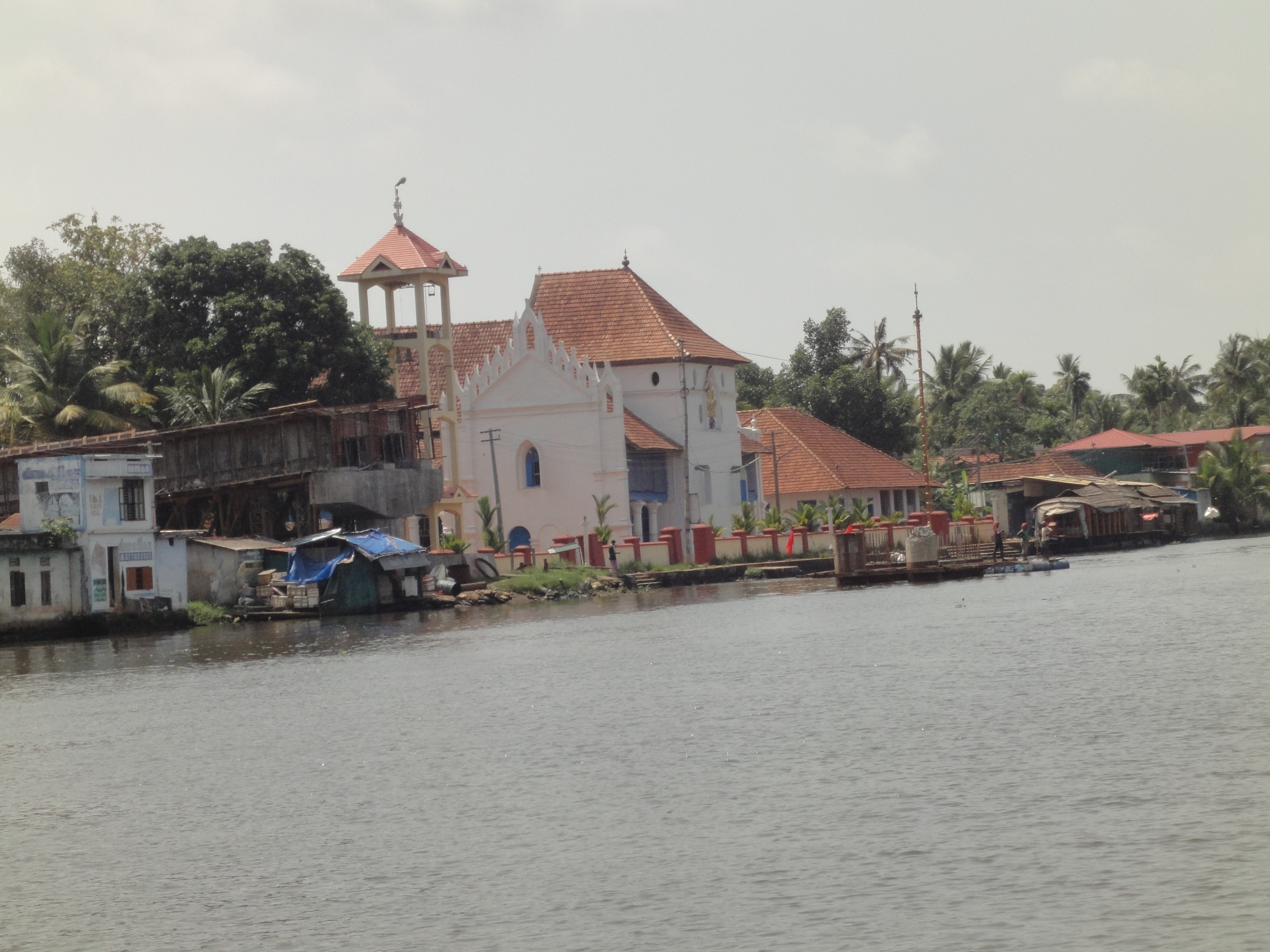
Champakulam Valia Palli on the Pampa River west bank. You can also see the Champakulam bridge under construction which will connect the east and west banks

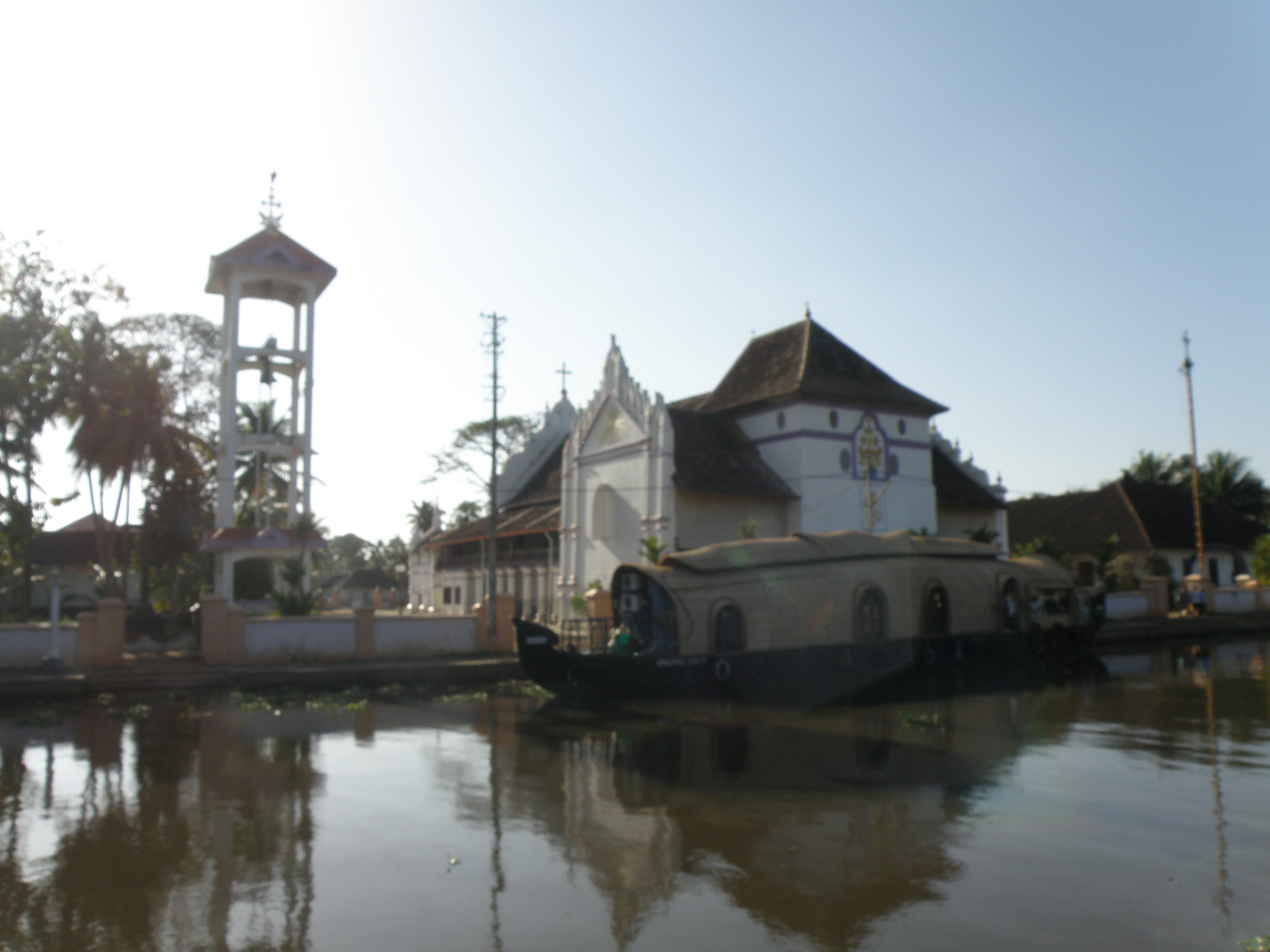
backwaters

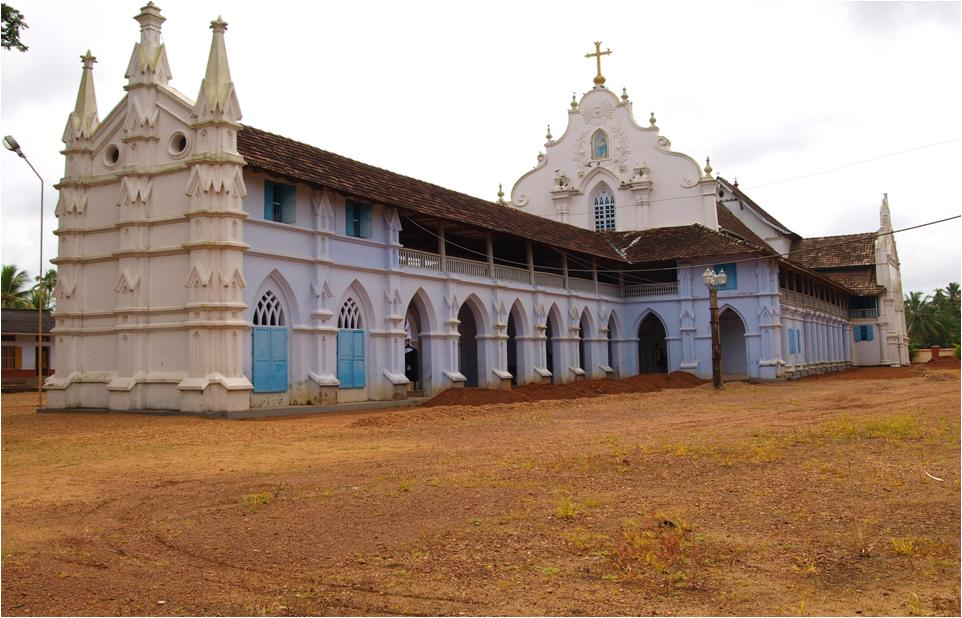
exterior

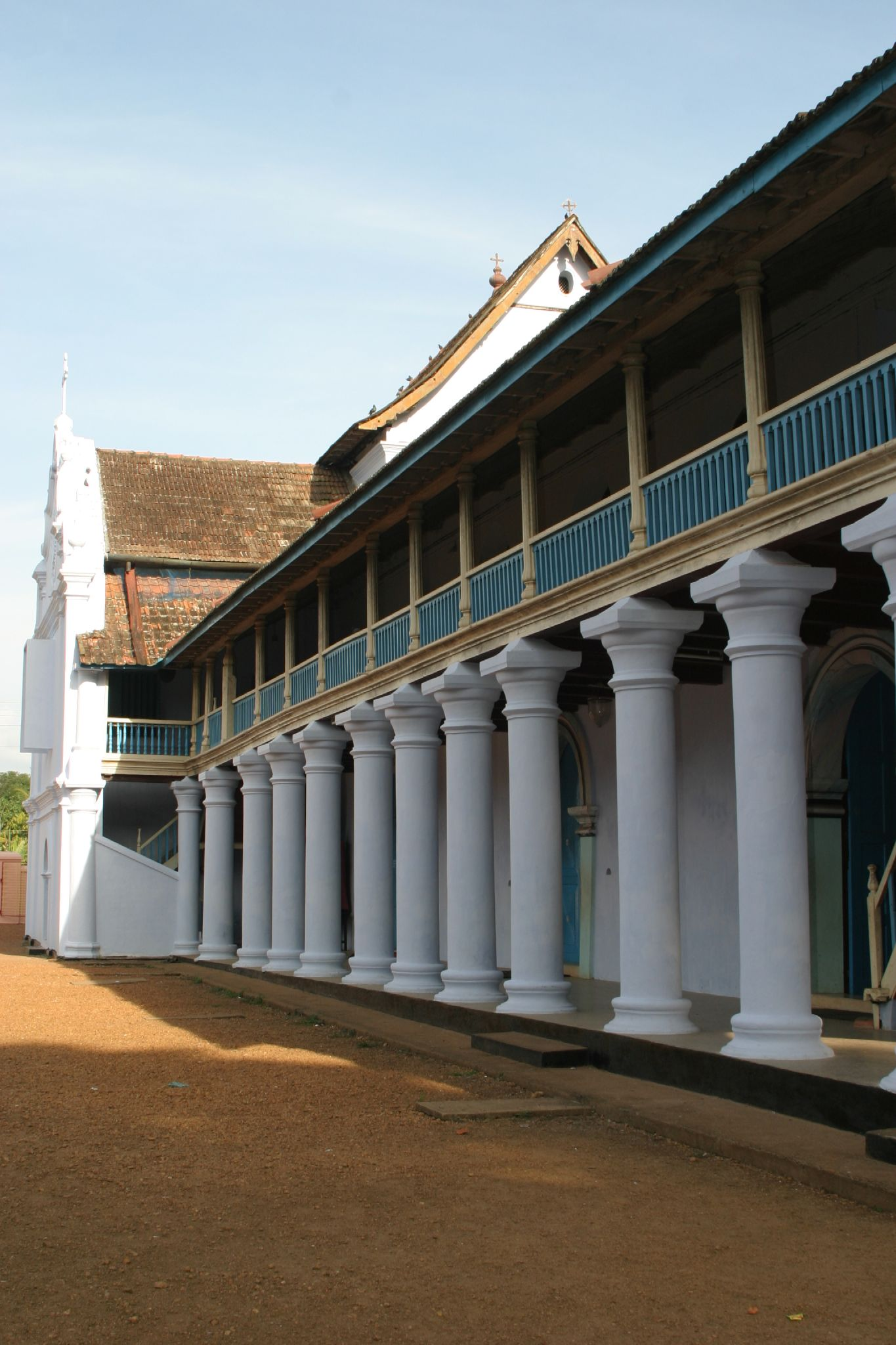
Closer look of Champakulam Valia Palli

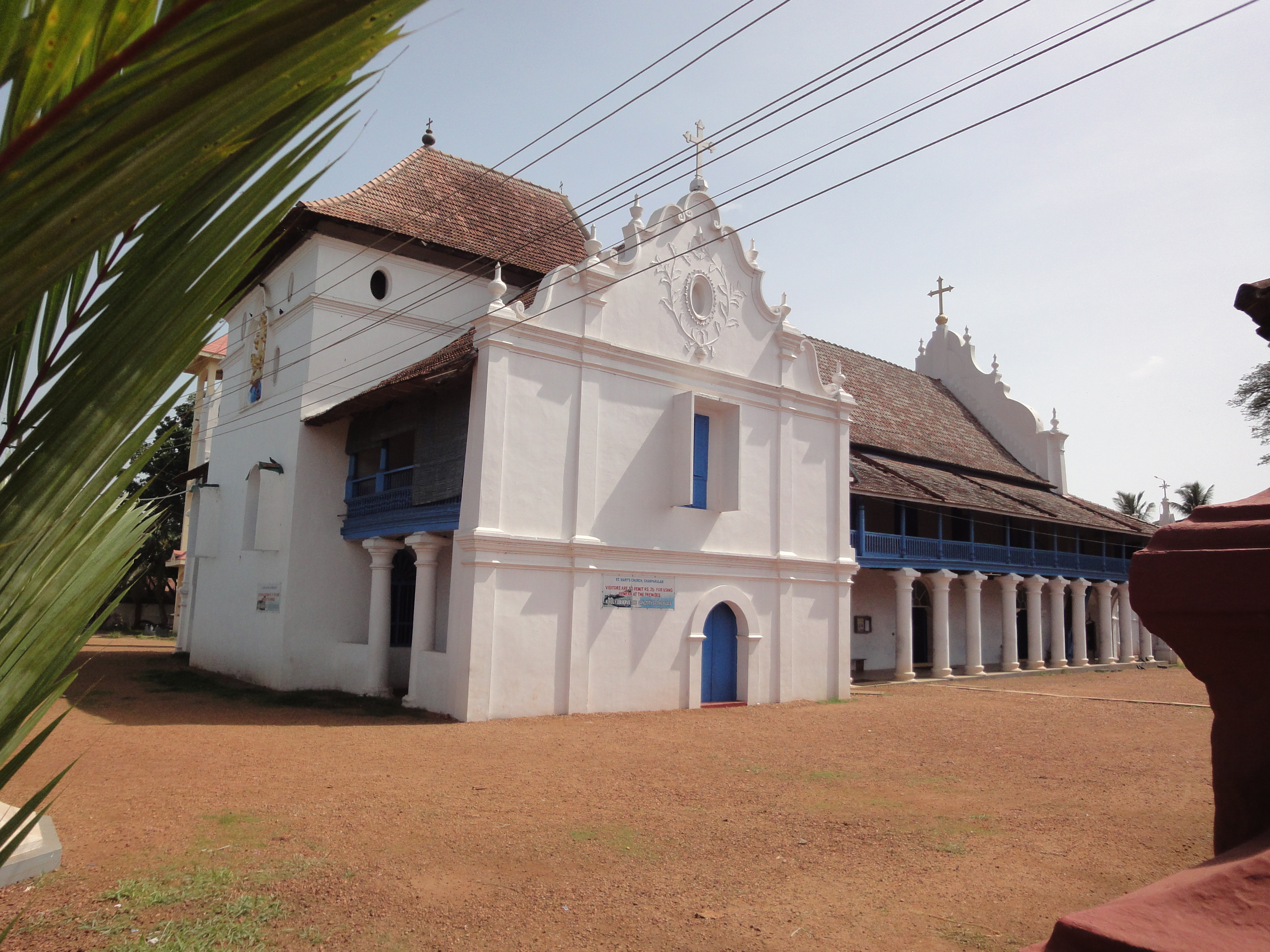
North East view

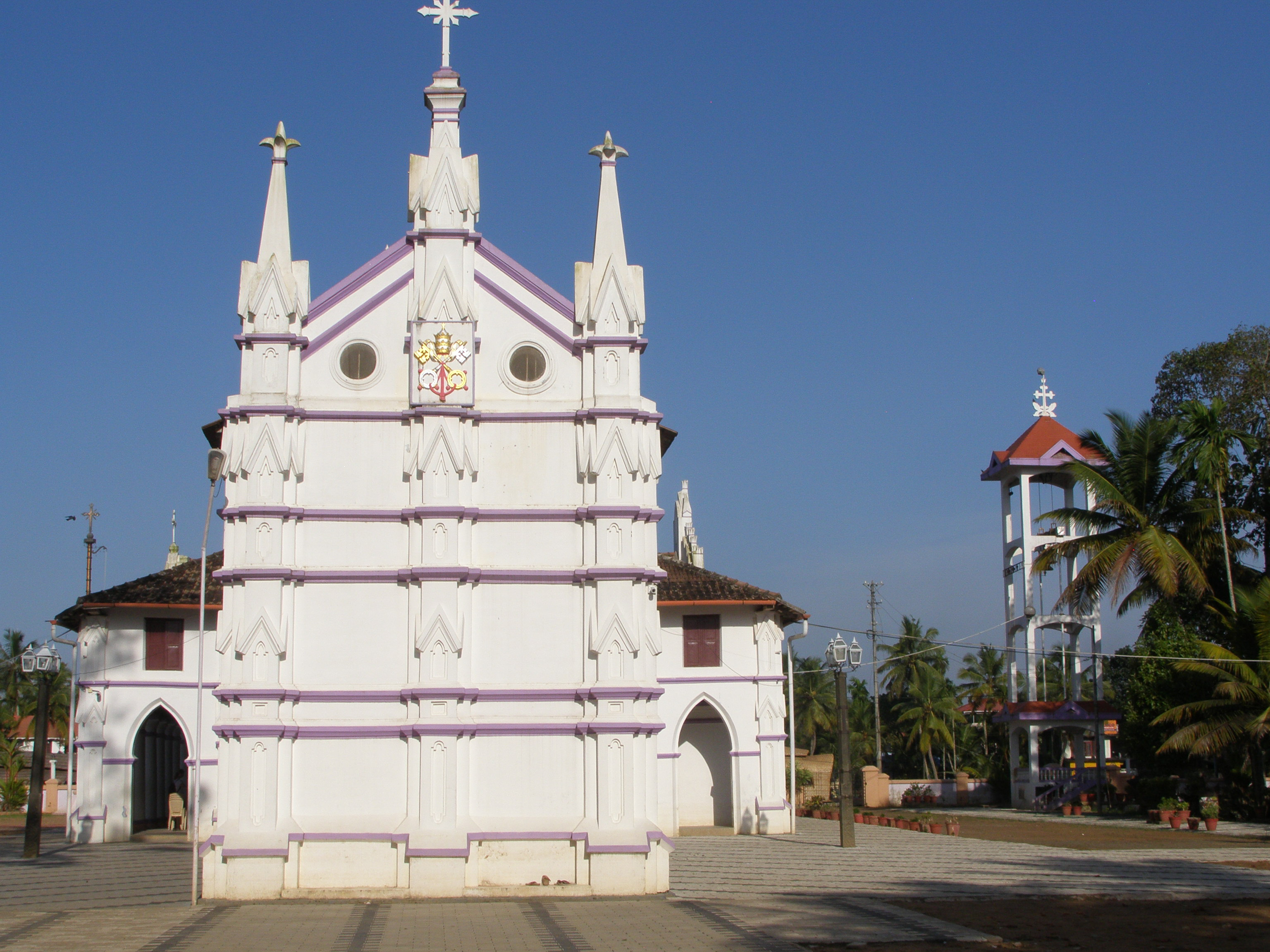
Front

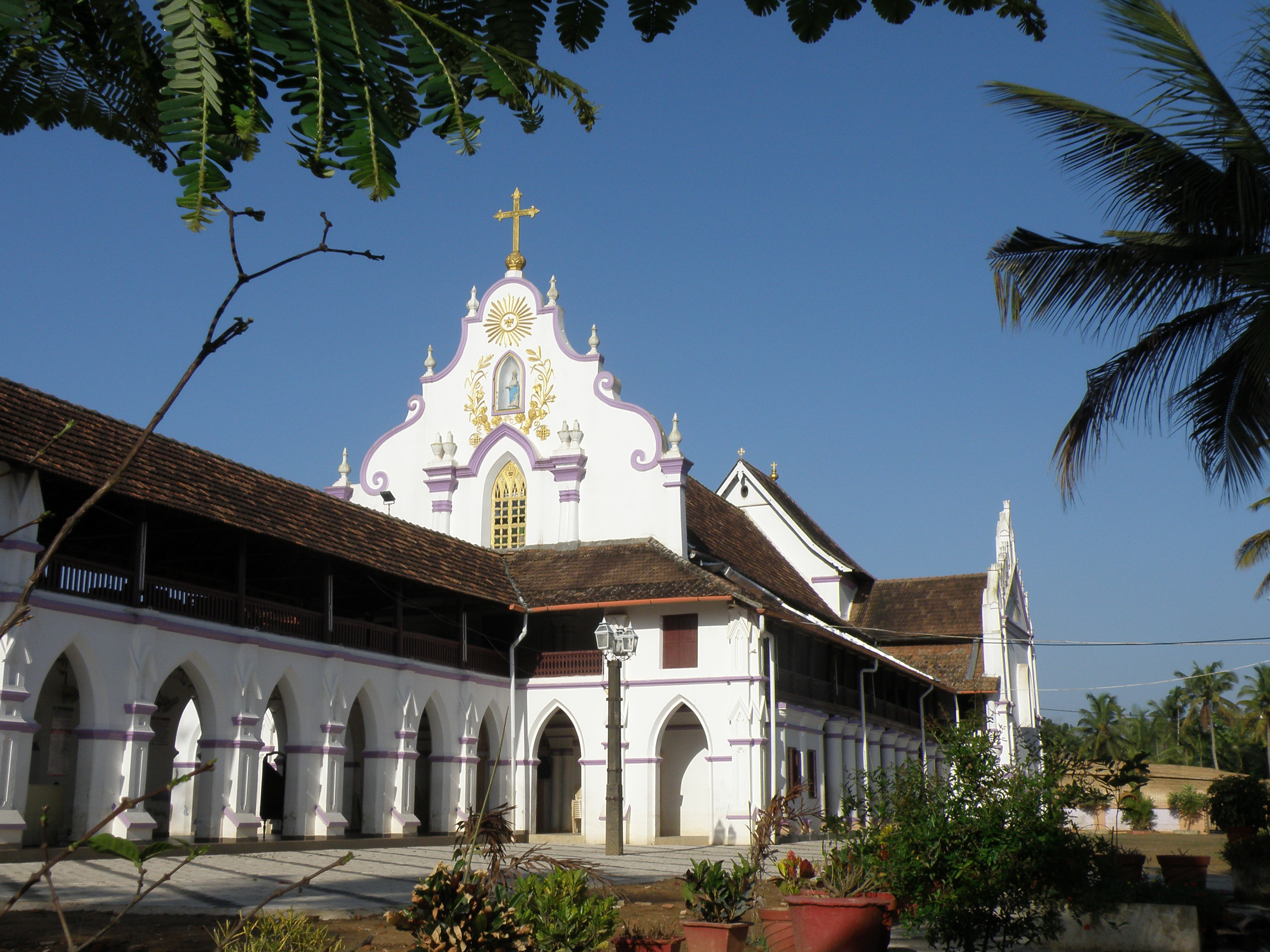
Another view

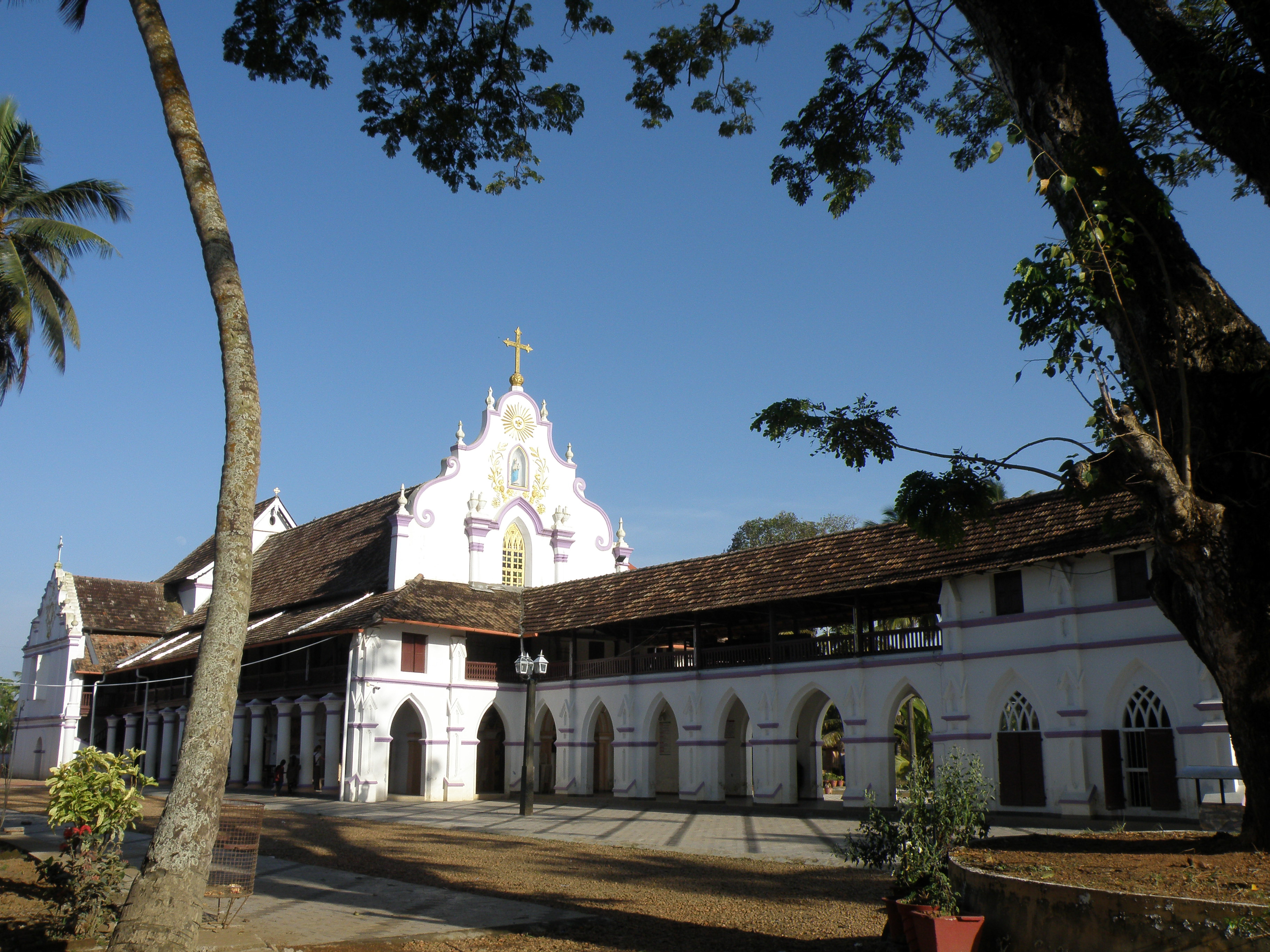

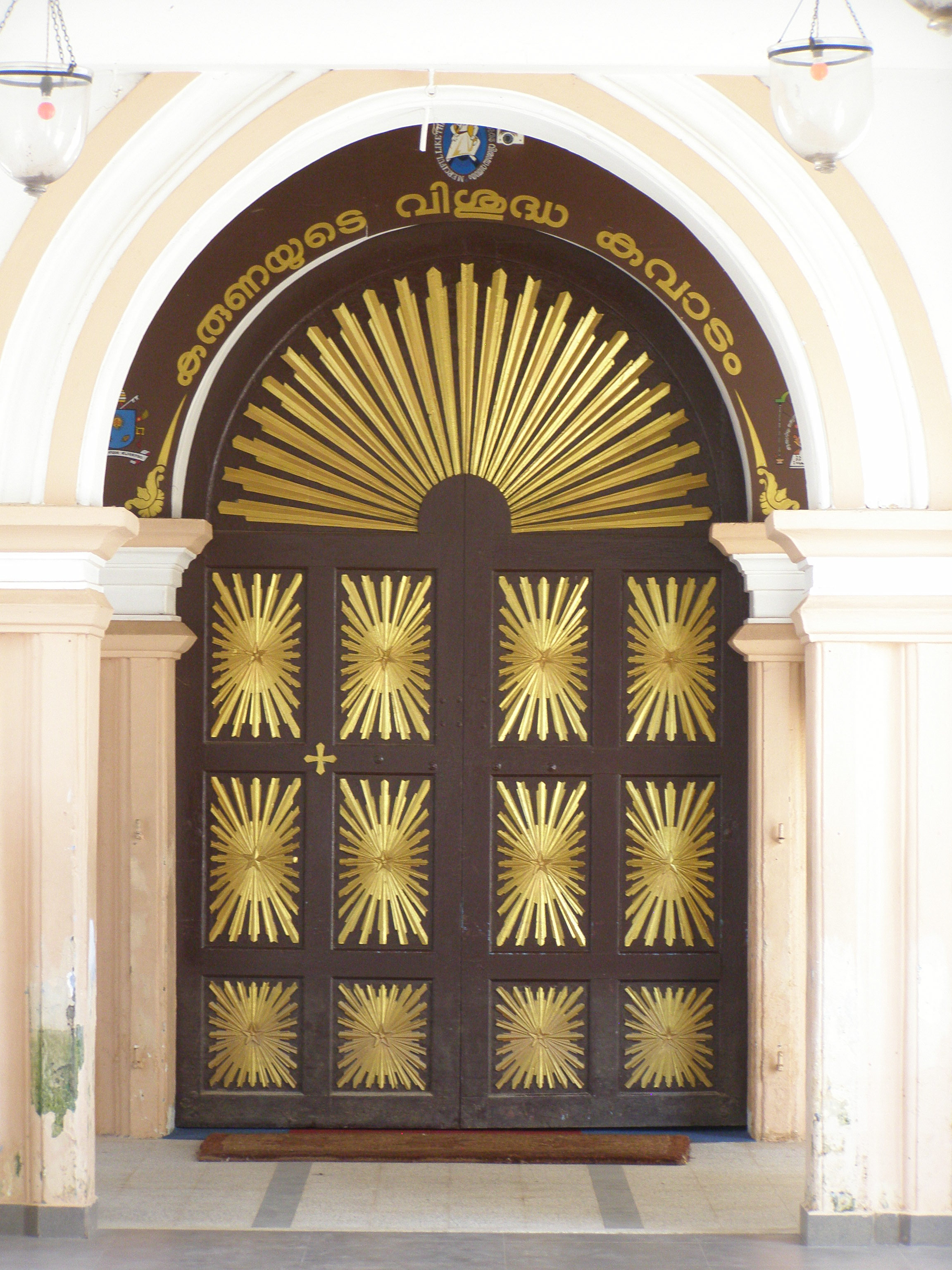
Main entrance

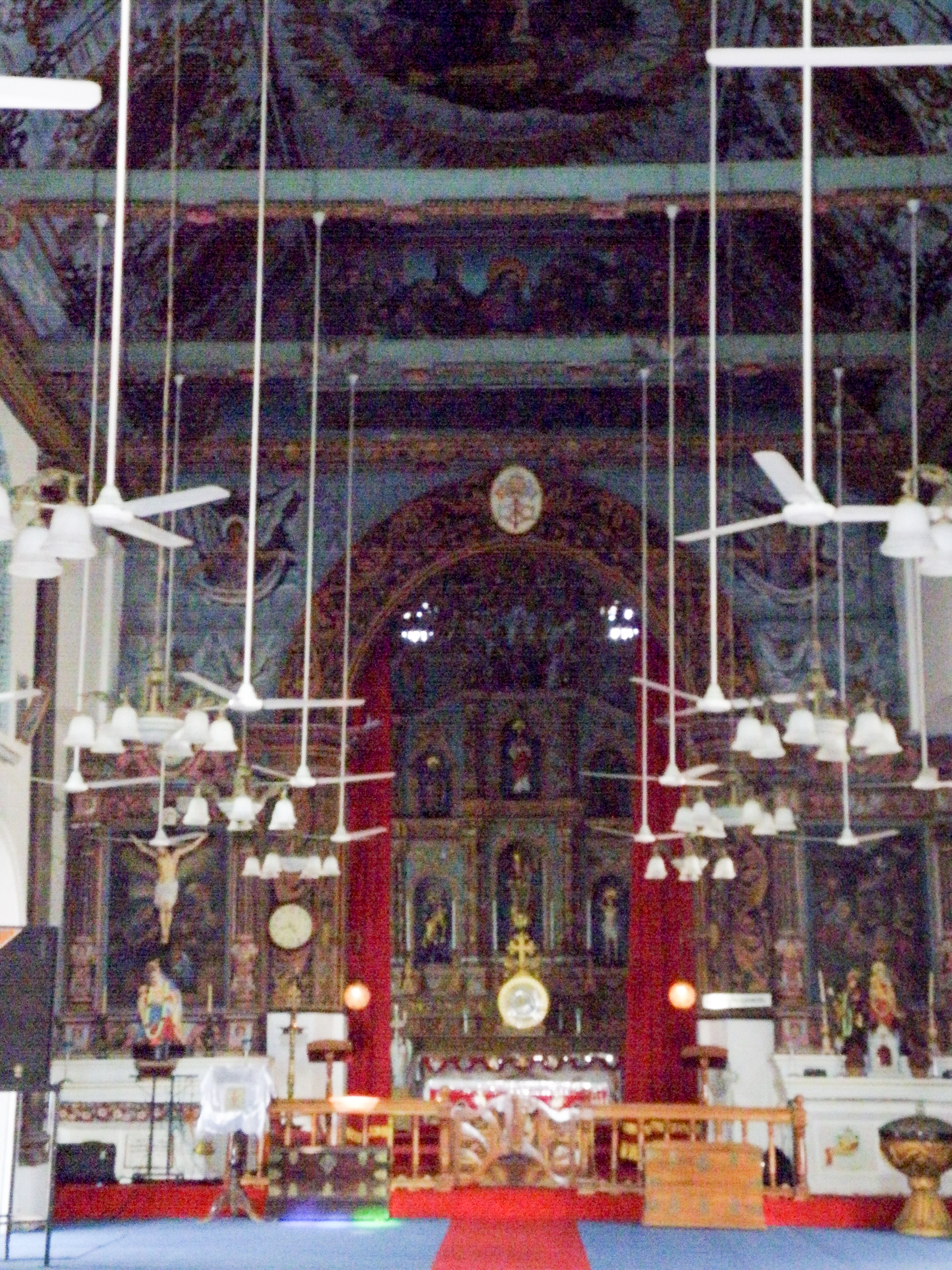
Inside

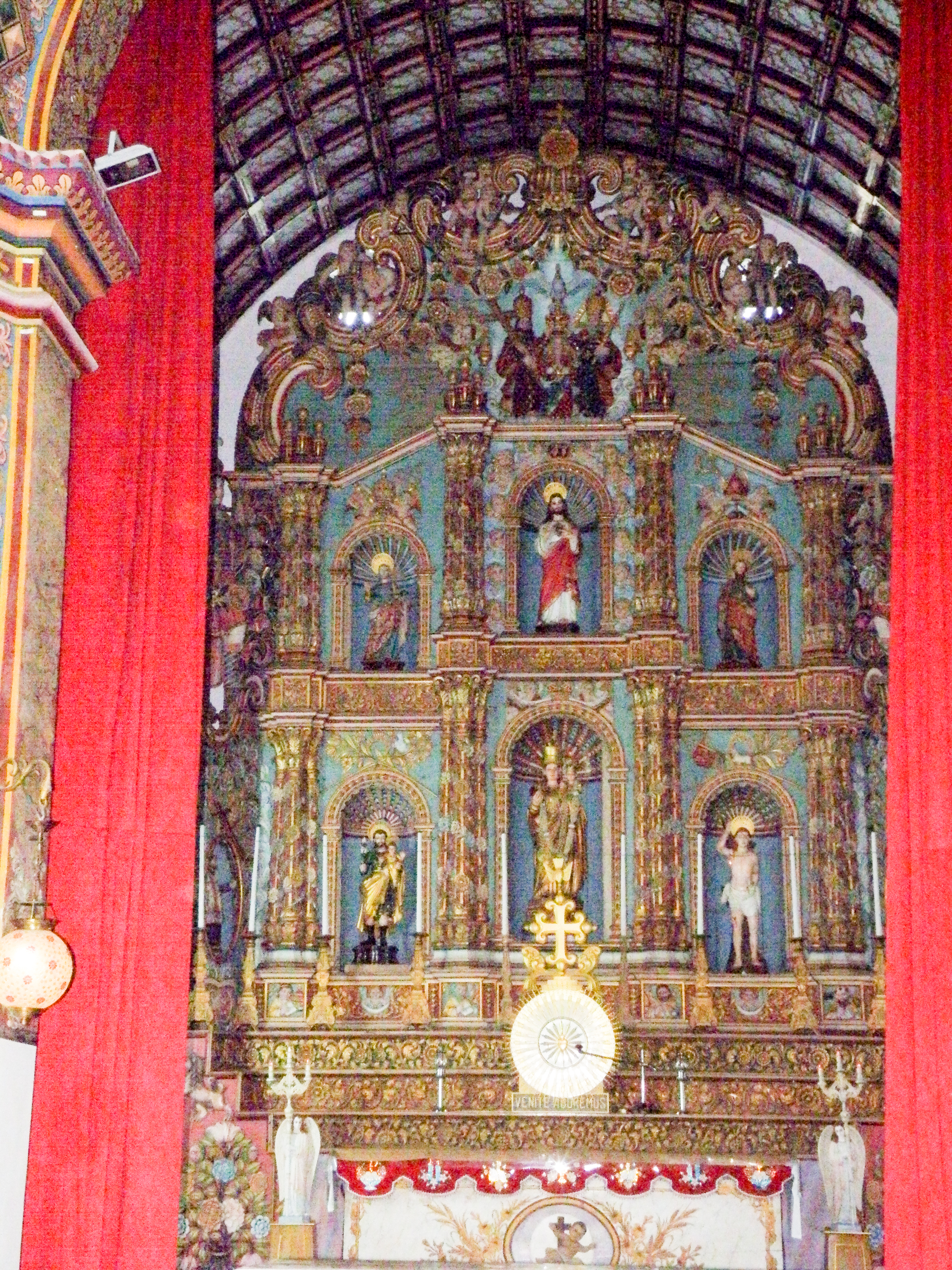
Madbaha

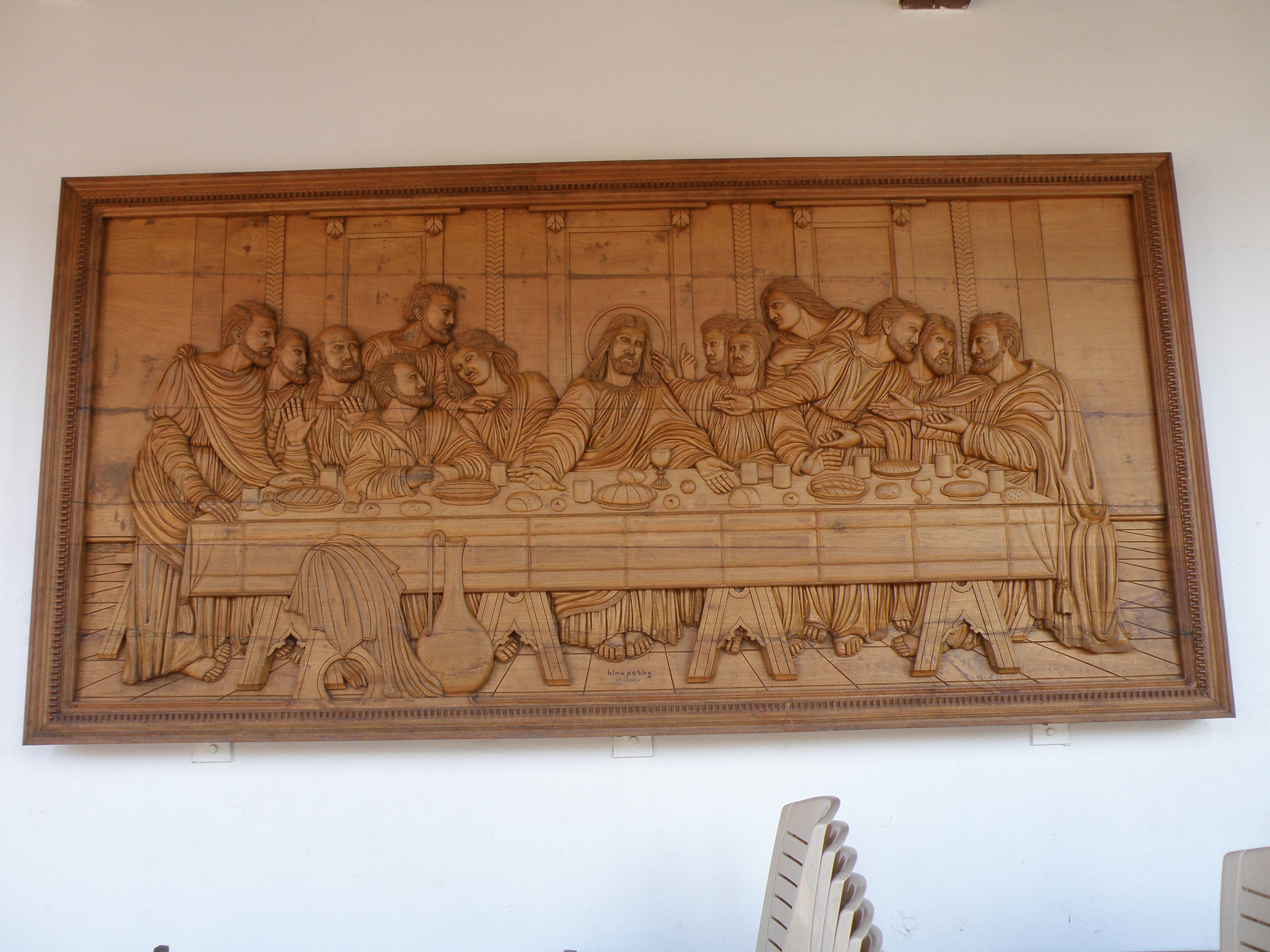

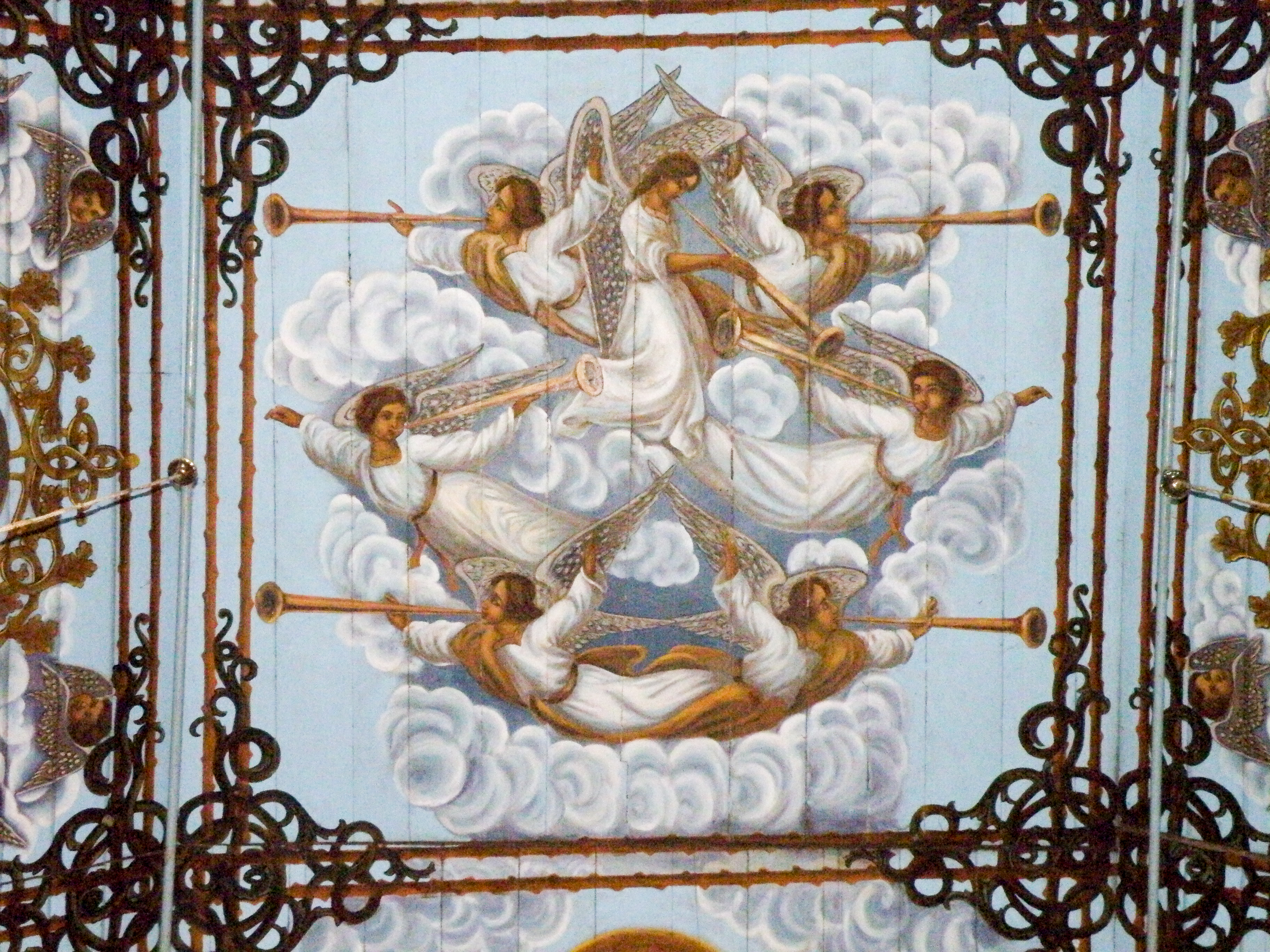
Decorated roof

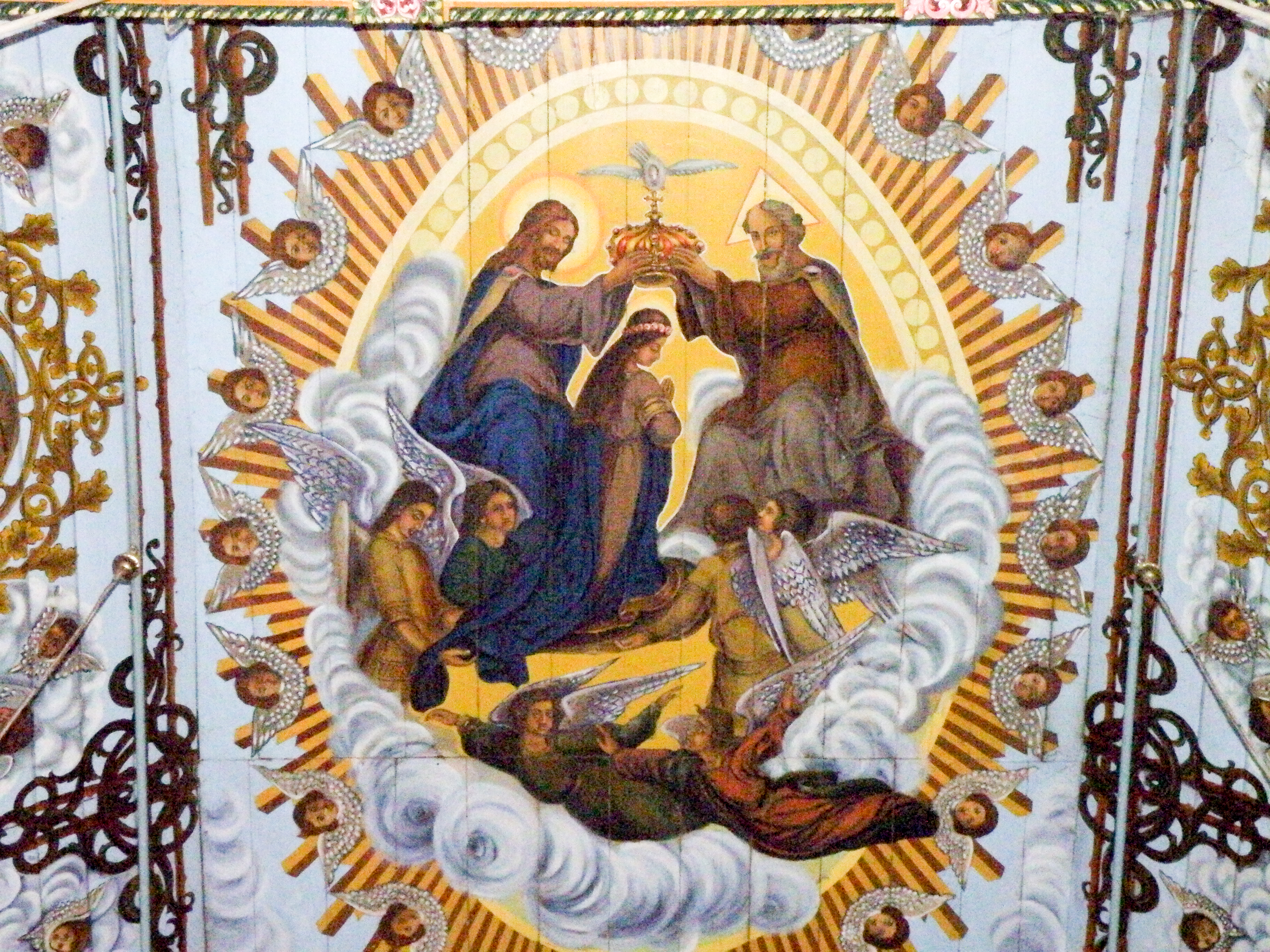
Coronation of Saint Mary depicted on the roof

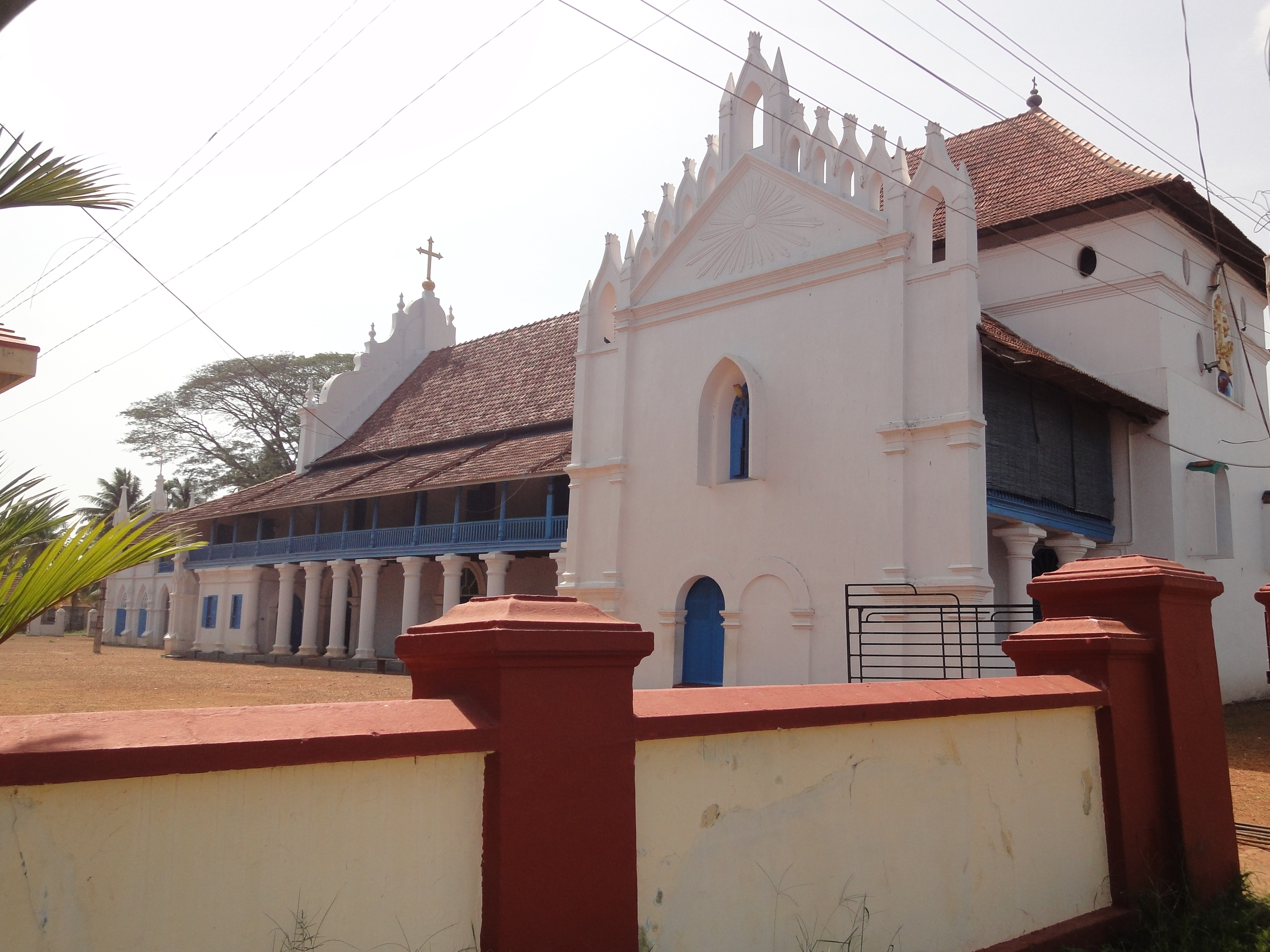
South East view
