= Basilica of Our Lady of the Holy Rosary, Karumathampatti =

Basilica of Our Lady of the Holy Rosary
- புனித செபமாலை அன்னை பசிலிக்கா
- Location in Tamil Nadu
- 11.1189°N 77.1781°E
- Location: Karumathampatti, Coimbatore District, Tamil Nadu
- Country: India
- Denomination: Catholic
- Tradition: Latin Rite
- Website: holyrosarybasilica.org

History
- Status: Minor basilica
- Founded: 1640
- Founder: Portuguese missionaries
- Dedication: Our Lady of the Rosary
- Consecrated: Rebuilt and consecrated in 1803
- Events: Annual feast on the first Sunday of October

Architecture
- Functional status: Active
- Designated: 22 July 2019
- Architectural type: Basilica
- Style: Colonial architecture with Tamil influences
- Years built: 1640; rebuilt 1803
- Groundbreaking: 1640
- Completed: 1803 (reconstruction)
- Demolished: 1684, 1784 (destroyed twice)

Administration
- Province: Tamil Nadu Ecclesiastical Province
- Diocese: Coimbatore
- Deanery: Karumathampatti
- Parish: Karumathampatti Parish

Clergy
- Bishop: Thomas Aquinas (Bishop of Coimbatore)
- Rector: Rev. Fr. Arun

The Basilica of Our Lady of the Holy Rosary, located at Karumathampatti in Tamil Nadu, is a prominent Catholic shrine in the Roman Diocese of Coimbatore. The church is dedicated to Our Lady of the Holy Rosary, and its annual feast is celebrated on the first Sunday of October every year, attracting pilgrims from across the region.

Karumathampatti is a pilgrimage centre. St. John de Britto visited the church at least 3 times. The original chapel was destroyed in 1684 by the soldiers of the Mysore Rajah Saraboji but rebuilt soon after. The church was again destroyed by Tipu Sultan in 1784 and rebuilt in 1803. It is visited by huge numbers of people in order to venerate Our Lady of the Rosary and to pray for favours. It was announced on 22 July 2019 that the church had been granted the status of a minor basilica and the formal elevation was held on 6 October 2019, the feast day.
