= Basilica of the Divine Motherhood of Our Lady =

- Location within Jharkhand
- 23.2992°N 85.4295°E
- Location: Ulhatu, Jharkhand
- Country: India
- Denomination: Roman Catholic

History
- Status: Basilica
- Founded: 1903
- Dedication: Blessed Virgin Mary

Architecture
- Functional status: Active
- Designated: 30 November 2004

Administration
- Diocese: Ranchi

The Basilica of the Divine Motherhood of Our Lady is a minor basilica in Ulhatu, near Ranchi in India. The decree designating it as a basilica was issued on 30 November 2004.

In the Roman Catholic Church, the Virgin Mary is regarded not only as the Mother of God but also as the Mother of the Church.

The origins of this church can be traced back to 1903, to a remote village called Kawali, where a village primary school was opened and placed under the care of a catechist. A village chapel was built at Kawali in 1907 and later shifted to Bhuthataur in 1948. A primary school functioned from here also and a priest attended the mass in this church. This was a time when Ulhatu still formed a part of the Ranchi Cathedral parish.

In 1952 when Fr Defrijn laid the foundation of the church and school building, living in a hut. The church was formally established in the year 1953. Soon pilgrims started to arrive at Ulhatu. In this shrine the statue of Our Lady of Halle feeding the child Jesus is placed.

There are several stories that are attached to the Mary in this parish. According to legend, when enemies attacked the city of Ranchi the locals sought her help. The statue of Our Lady received all the cannonballs of the enemies, becoming blackened but saving the city. This parish happens to be within the Horal Jungle Field Firing Range.

Another story which talks of a student, Constant Lievens, who went on a pilgrimage to Mary in Halle and got a confirmation of his vocation to the Ranchi Missionary. When Lievens visited Kawali village in the year 1889, he saved the lives of people there, resulting in a movement towards the church. The story goes that Lievens was sick in Belgium and he yearned to return to the church in honor of Our Lady. Lievens died but his remains were sent to Ranchi in 1993, just a hundred years after this death. His plan was implemented at Ulhatu where the shrine was blessed in 1995.

The Ulhatu church has village chapels attached to it in Banpur, Barhibera, Jaratoli, Kawali, Kudagarha, Plandu, Serengtoli, and Sogod. Several convents are run by this church, including St Anne's Convent, Sisters of the Immaculate Heart of Mary, and educational institutions including St Joseph's High School, RC Middle School and Primary Schools, Convent School and St Anne's KG School and St Anne's Grihini School. There is also a St Anne's Dispensary that functions at Raja Ulhatu, Ranchi serving the less-privileged members of society.
