= Basilica of Our Lady of Lourdes, Chemperi =

Basilica of Our Lady of Lourdes
- Lourde Matha Basilica
- Location within Kerala
- 12.0940364°N 75.5423432°E
- Location: Chemperi, Kerala
- Country: India
- Language: Malayalam
- Denomination: Syro Malabar Catholic
- Tradition: East Syriac
- Website: chemperibasilica.com

History
- Founded: 1948
- Dedication: Mar Raphael Thattil
- Dedicated: August 14,2024

Architecture
- Functional status: Basilica

Administration
- Archdiocese: Archdiocese of Tellicherry

Clergy
- Archbishop: Mar Joseph Pamplany
- Rector: Fr. Thomas Thayyil

The Basilica of Our Lady of Lourdes is a church in Chemperi, India. The church was established in 1948. It was raised to the status of a minor basilica by Pope Francis in April 2024. The official ceremony of elevating it to a basilica took place on 14 August 2024. Lourde Matha Basilica is the fifth and the only Basilica of the Syro-Malabar Church beyond the River Bharathapuzha.
