= Basilica of Our Lady of Divine Grace =

- Location within Bihar
- 25.3895816°N 85.9141746°E
- Location: Mokama, Bihar
- Country: India
- Denomination: Catholic

Architecture
- Functional status: Basilica

Administration
- Archdiocese: Archdiocese of Patna

The Basilica of Our Lady of Divine Grace is a pilgrimage centre and Mariam shrine in Bihar, India. It was raised to the status of a minor basilica by Pope Francis in April 2024.
