= Annai Velankanni Shrine, Chennai =

Catholic basilica in Chennai, India

Annai Velankanni Shrine Basilica
- Shrine Basilica of Our Lady of Good Health Annai Vailankanni
- Main entrance to the church
- Annai Velankanni Shrine Basilica
- 12.9952°N 80.2701°E
- Location: Besant Nagar, Chennai, Tamil Nadu
- Country: India
- Denomination: Catholic

History
- Status: Minor Basilica, Shrine

Architecture
- Functional status: Active

Administration
- Archdiocese: Archdiocese of Madras and Mylapore

Annai Velankanni Shrine Basilica is a Roman Catholic church and pilgrimage center located in the Besant Nagar neighbourhood of Chennai, Tamil Nadu, India. It is a seashore shrine dedicated to Our Lady of Good Health, colloquially known as the Arokiya Madha, Velankanni Madha, or Annai Velankanni, (Note: In Tamil, the Blessed Virgin Mary is referred to as the Madha or Annai, meaning Mother.) a title of the Blessed Virgin Mary from the popular Indian Marian apparition at the town of Velankanni, Nagapattinam district, which is 335 kilometers away from Chennai on the same Coromandel coast. As such, the church is also known as Chinna Velankanni (transl. Little Velankanni) and its Marian devotion referred to as Our Lady of Besant Nagar to distinguish it from that of the original Basilica at Velankanni. Pope Leo XIV elevated the shrine to the status of a minor basilica on 21 September 2026.

The church is located on the shores of Edward Elliot's Beach. It is the largest and most popular shrine dedicated to Our Lady of Good Health outside of Velankanni. It began as a chapel in 1970, and subsequently grew into a parish and a Marian shrine. Over time, the shrine became a site of international, multicultural, and religious harmony, receiving Christian and non-Christian pilgrims.
