= Doranahalli =

Village in Karnataka, India

Doranahalli (Dornahalli) Christian Koppalu
- village
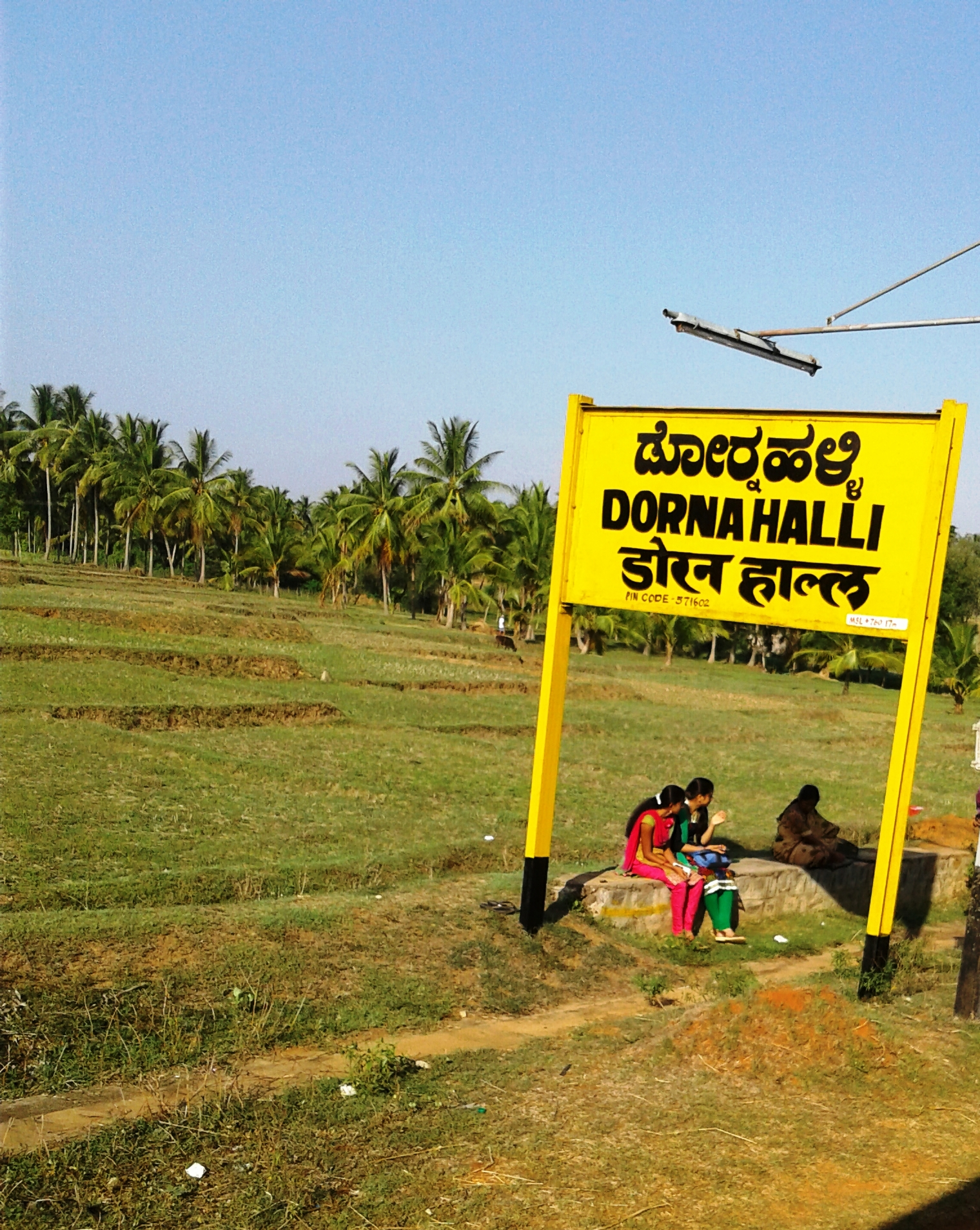

- Location in Karnataka, India Doranahalli (Dornahalli) (India)
- Coordinates: 12.389240°N 76.9671600°E
- Country: India
- State: Karnataka
- District: Mysore

Languages
  - Official: Kannada
- Time zone: UTC+5:30 (IST)
- PIN: 571602
- Telephone code: 08223
- Nearest city: Mysore

Doranahalli is a village in Mysore district, Karnataka, India.
