= St. Mary's Basilica, Bengaluru =

Coordinates: 12°59′3.1″N 77°36′13.99″E

St. Mary's Basilica
- ಸೇಂಟ್ ಮೇರಿಸ್ ಬೆಸಿಲಿಕಾ
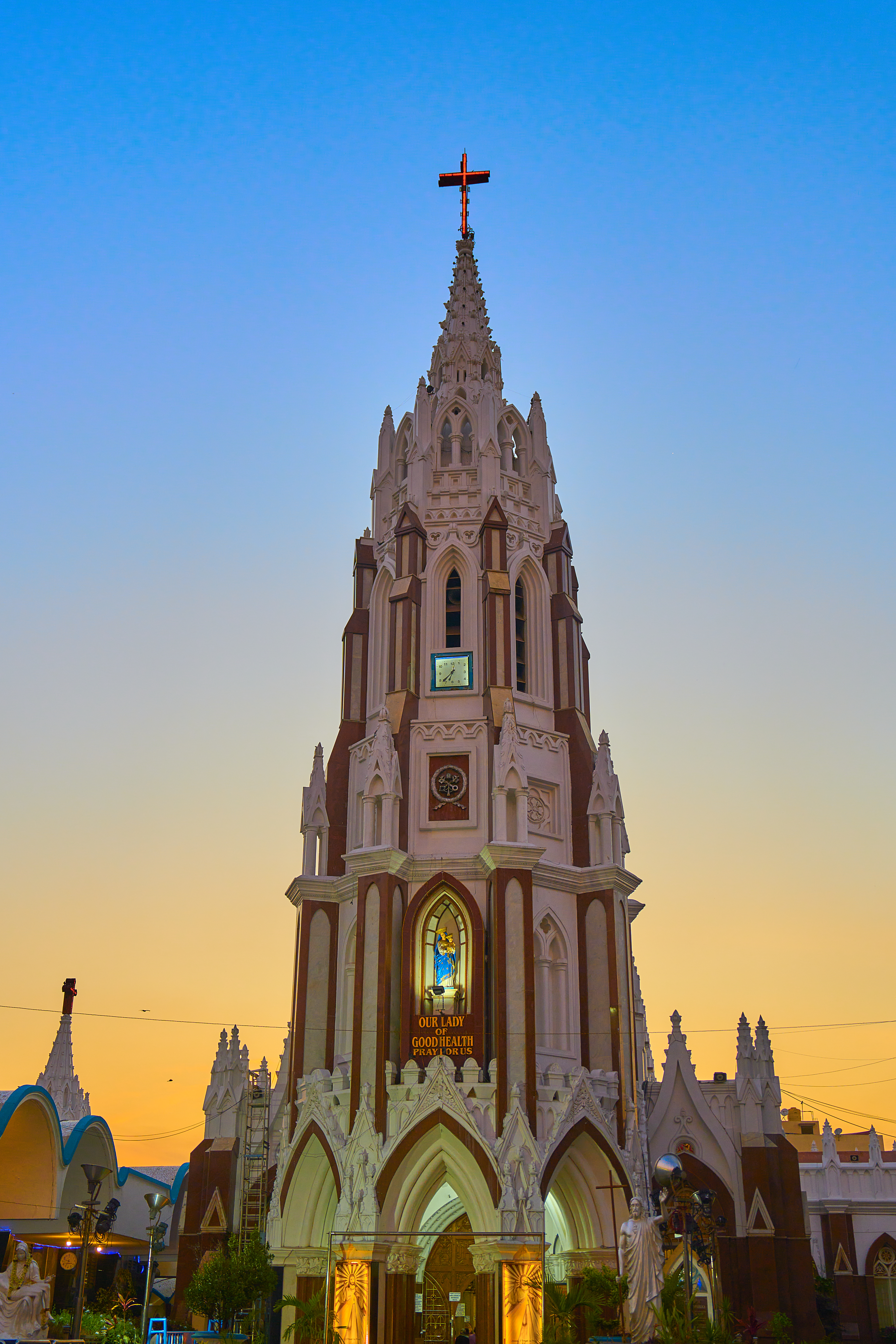
- St. Mary's Basilica
- Location: Bangalore, Karnataka
- Country: India
- Denomination: Roman Catholic

History
- Status: Minor Basilica
- Founder: Fr. Jean-Antoine Dubois
- Dedication: St. Mary
- Consecrated: 8 September 1882

Architecture
- Functional status: Active
- Style: Gothic

Administration
- Archdiocese: Archdiocese of Bangalore
- Deanery: Basilica Deanery

Clergy
- Archbishop: Archbishop Peter Machado
- Rector: Fr. Martin Kumar
- Vicar(s): S. Jaynathan & Msgr. C. Francis
- Dean: Fr. Martin Ananda Kumar.
- Priest: Fr. Martin Kumar

St. Mary's Basilica is a shrine located in Shivajinagar (Blackpally) locality of Karnataka, India. It is among the oldest churches at Bangalore and the first church in the state that has been elevated to the status of a minor basilica. It is famous for festivities held during the St. Mary's Feast in the month of September each year, attracting devotees from the entire metropolitan area of Bangalore.

== History ==
St. Mary's Basilica had a humble beginning as a thatched hut in the 17th century, built by Tamil Christian migrants from Gingee. The Shrine was then known as 'Chapel of Kanikkai Madha' and was located in their village where rice was grown. The rice grown in the village had a distinct white colour, and hence the settlement came to known as Bili Akki Palli or colloquiallyly could have been named after John Blakiston (1785-1867), who designed the layout of the Bangalore Cantonment.

Bangalore was not a big city in 1648 when Christianity entered Seringapatam, the capital of the then the Mysore Kingdom. But during Hyder Ali's tenure in 1724–25, Bangalore saw its first Church, Drummers' Chapel, in the Kalasipalya locality. When Tippu Sultan ascended the throne, Christian missionaries had to flee Mysore; thus the history of Christianity in Mysore was murky until 1799. With the Third Anglo-Mysore War Bangalore was seized from the tyranny of Tipu Sultan, who was defeated. The French MEP priest Jean-Antoine Dubois arrived at Bangalore and began restoring the Catholic religion. He went around Somanahalli, Kamanahalli, Begur, Gunjam, Palahalli, Doranahalli, Garenahalli, Shettyhalli, and beyond, visiting the Catholic families there and ministering to their spiritual needs. He was one of the first to introduce vaccination into India; he also wrote the famous book Hindu Manners, Customs and Ceremonies. The Mass vestments worn by Fr Jean-Antoine Dubois are still preserved in the church at Palahalli near Srirangapattana.

Dubois built a chapel with a thatched roof in 1803 at Bili Akki Palli, or colloquially Blackpally and offered Mass there. The structure was called Kaanike Mathe Devalaya, which in Kannada means the Church of Our Lady of the Presentation. That small prayer house is the location where the basilica currently stands. When Bangalore Cantonment was established, a Mass was regularly held by Dubois and attended by both European and Indian Catholics. In 1811 Dubois built a small chapel with a rectory for priests. In 1813, with the help of the British, he modified and enhanced the chapel and renamed it the Church of the Purification of Our Lady, Blackpalli. Until recently the engraving of the year '1813' was seen in the front nave of the old church where the miraculous statue is housed.

Fr Andreas, a priest from Pondicherry of Indian origin, succeeded Dubois and expanded the church building in the shape of a cross. But it was destroyed during the communal riots of 1832, and troops had to be called in to protect the settlement for many months.

The church was rebuilt during the years 1856–1882 under its original name, the Church of our Lady of the Presentation. The current form of the majestic Gothic-style church (pictured) is credited to Rev L E Kleiner. It was consecrated on 8 September 1882 by Bishop Jean-Yves-Marie Coadou, the Vicar Apostolic of Mysore, in the presence of 35 priests and 4,000 Catholics of Bangalore. The total amount spent on the construction of the new church. including the pulpit and the statues, was Rs. 29,659.

Over time, the church of St Mary's at Blackpally had become a parish and has since overseen the construction of other churches in Bangalore, most prominently St Francis Xavier's Cathedral (1851), St Joseph's Church (1867), and Sacred Heart Church, Ashoknagar (Austin Town) (1867). The church was elevated to the status of a minor basilica in 1973 through an edict issued by Pope Paul VI. It was the sixth church in India to be elevated to this status. An annual nine-day novena is held between 30 August and 7 September, with Mass being offered in English, Kannada, Malayalam and Tamil. The area of Blackpally is now known as Shivajinagar.

== Architecture ==
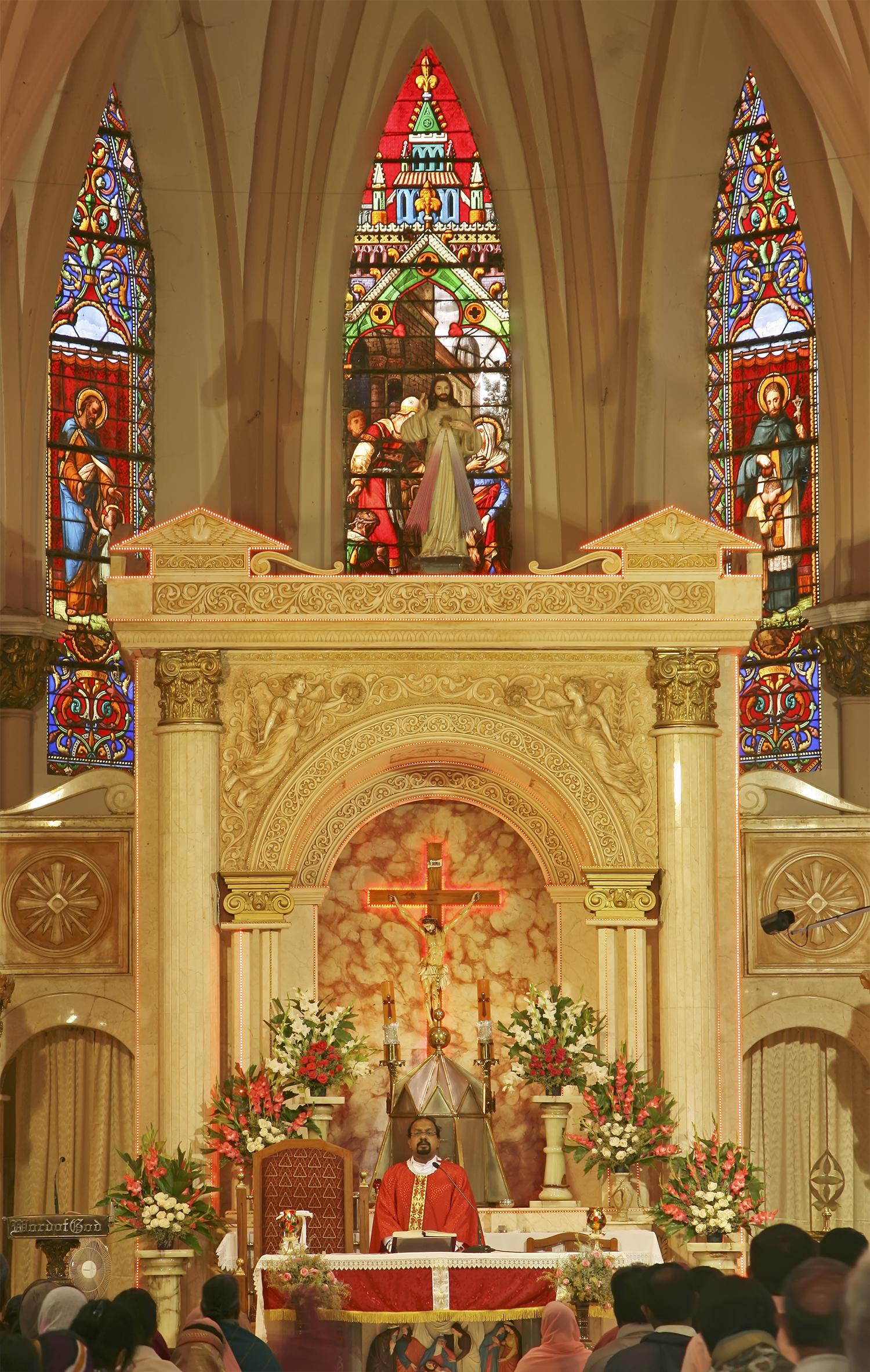

The basilica has been built in the Gothic style with arches, ornamental motifs, and stained glass windows. Multiple columns with rich Corinthian capitals support the stately arches of the church. The columns and tall spires of the basilica can be seen from far away. The stained glass windows were removed during World War II and were subsequently restored in 1947.

== St. Mary's feast ==
St. Mary's Feast which celebrates the birth of Mother Mary is the most important festival celebrated in the basilica and is attended by 500,000 people.Bangalore has two million christians, yet, more than five hundred thousands attended that church especially Hindus and Muslims. Held in the month of September, the festivities go on for 10 days culminating in a grand chariot procession on the last day. The festivities begin with the hoisting of a traditional flag. A Novena is held on the first nine days from 29 August to 7 September. September 8, the day on which Mother Mary was born, is celebrated as a Holy feast. Mass is offered in different languages and mass marriages are conducted for the poor and needy. A thanksgiving Mass is also organized for couples who have completed 50 years of marriage. Eucharistic celebrations are held on the day of the feast and a decorated chariot with the image of Mother Mary is drawn by devotees along the various streets of Bangalore.

== Mass times ==
| Weekdays | Saturday | Sunday |
|---|---|---|
| 06:00 English; 07:00 Tamil; 09:00 Kannada; 11:00 Tamil; 18:00 Mon, Tue & Fri Tamil; 18:00 Wed Kannada; 18:00 Thu English | 06:00 English; 07:00 Tamil; 9:00 Kannada; 10:00 English; 11:00 Tamil; 18:00 Tamil | 06:00 English; 07:00 Tamil; 08:00 Tamil; 09:15 Kannada; 11:00 Tamil; 18:00 English |

== Gallery ==
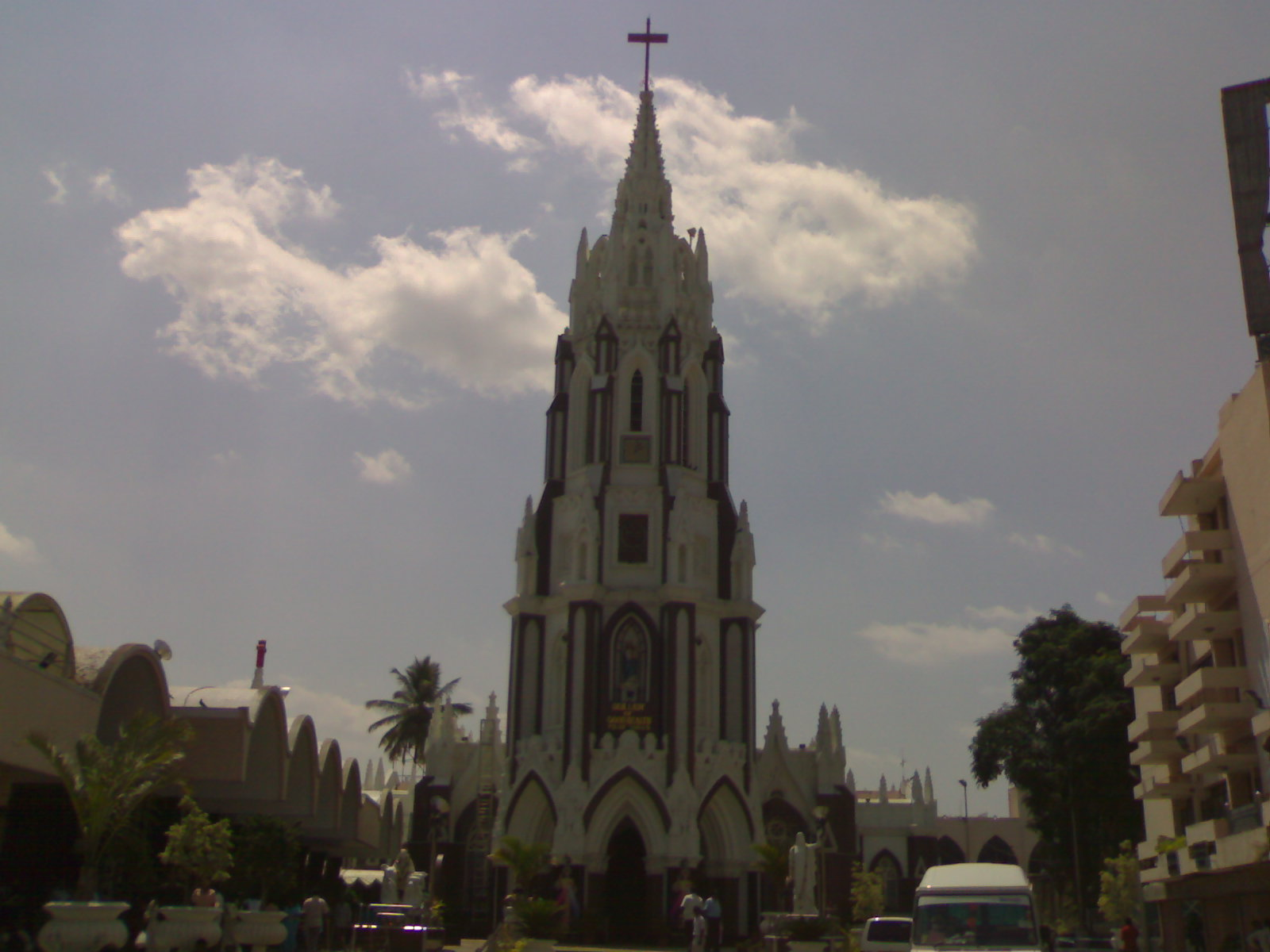
The church

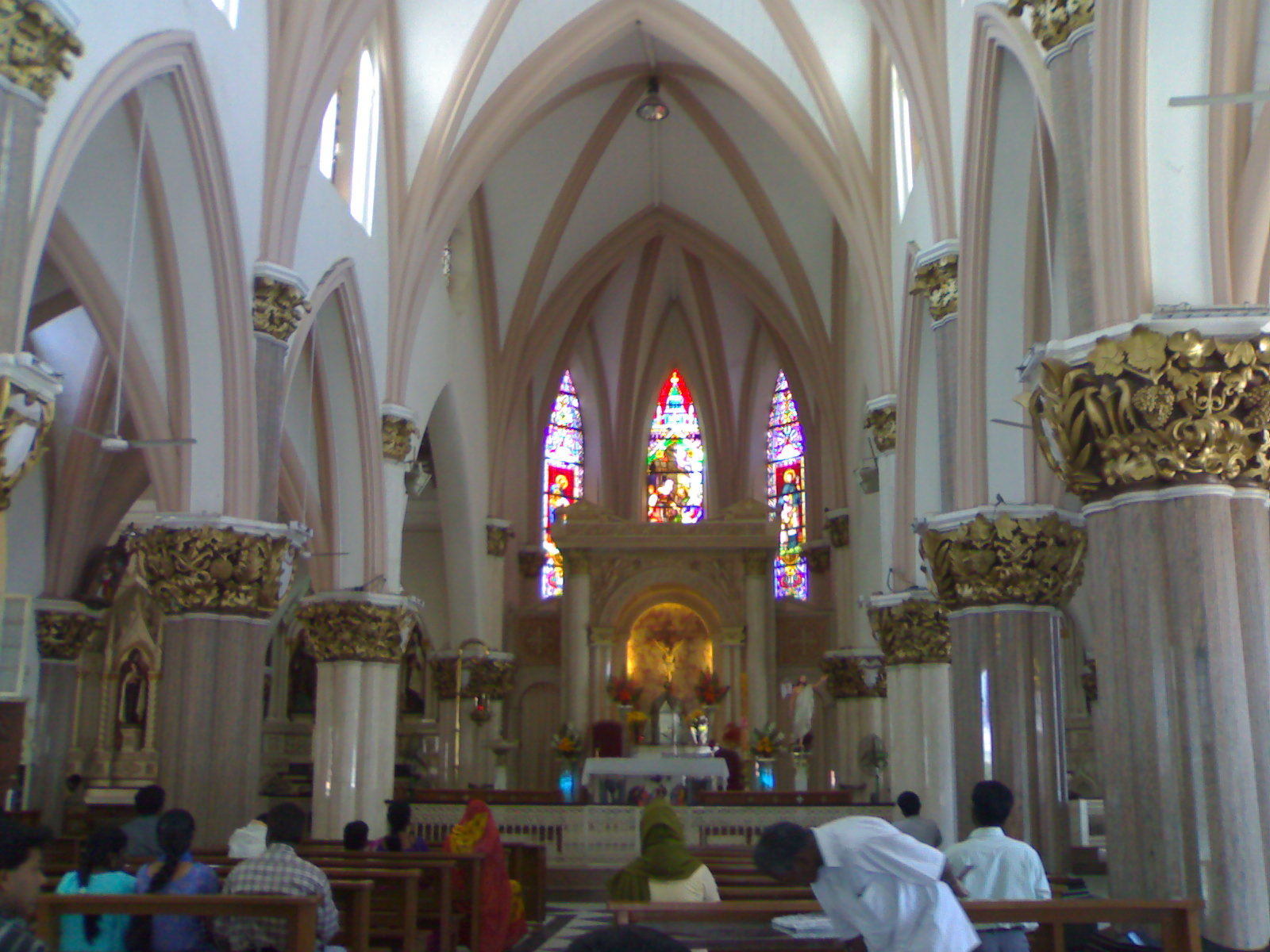
Nave

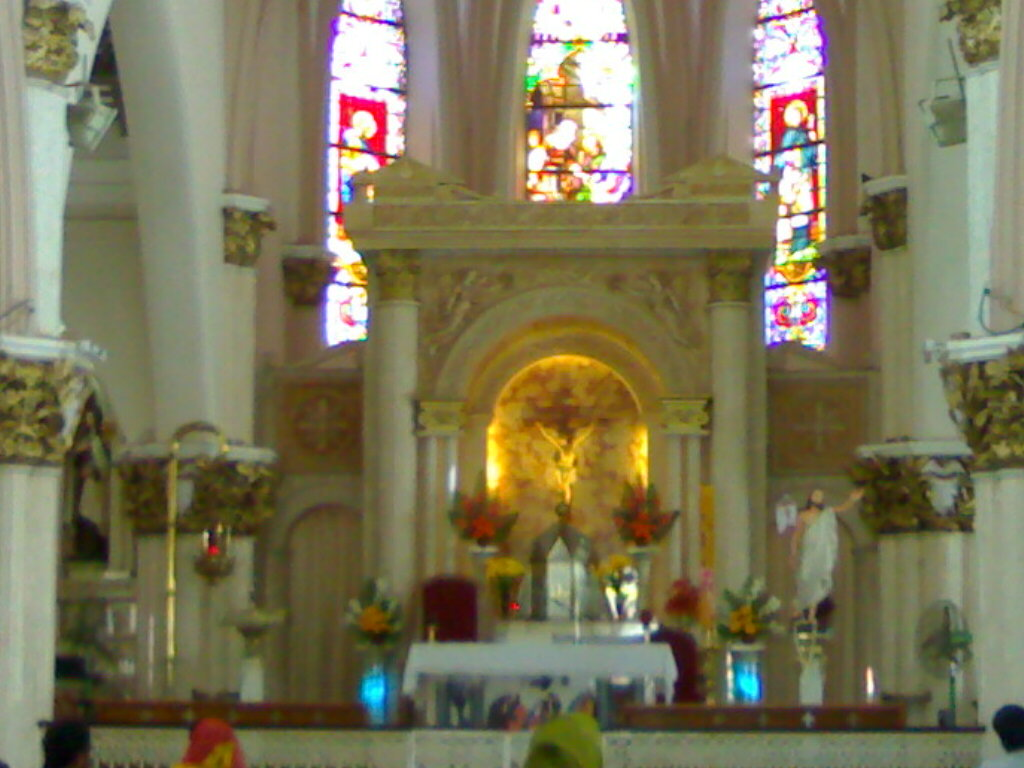
Altar

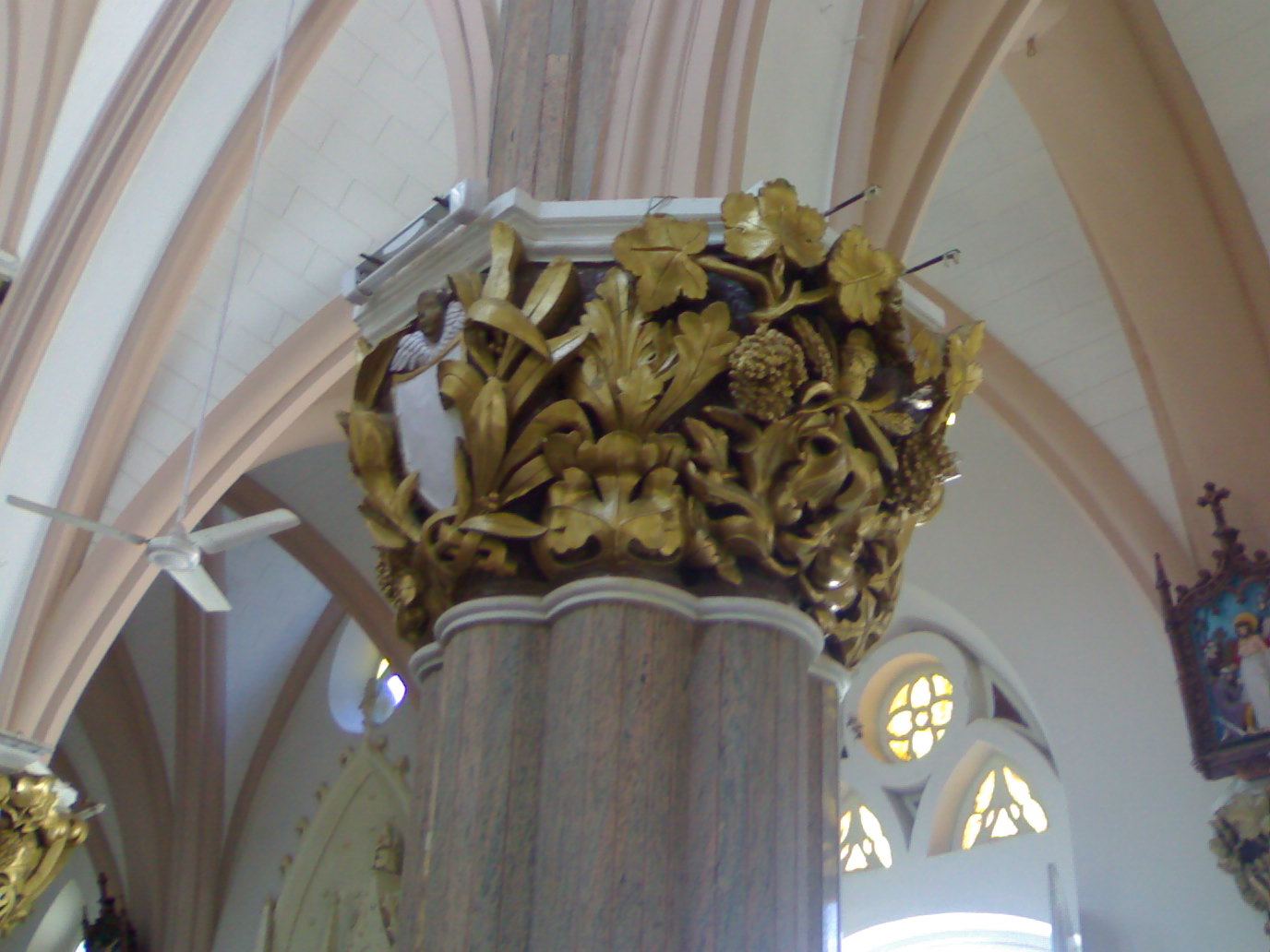
Pillars inside the church

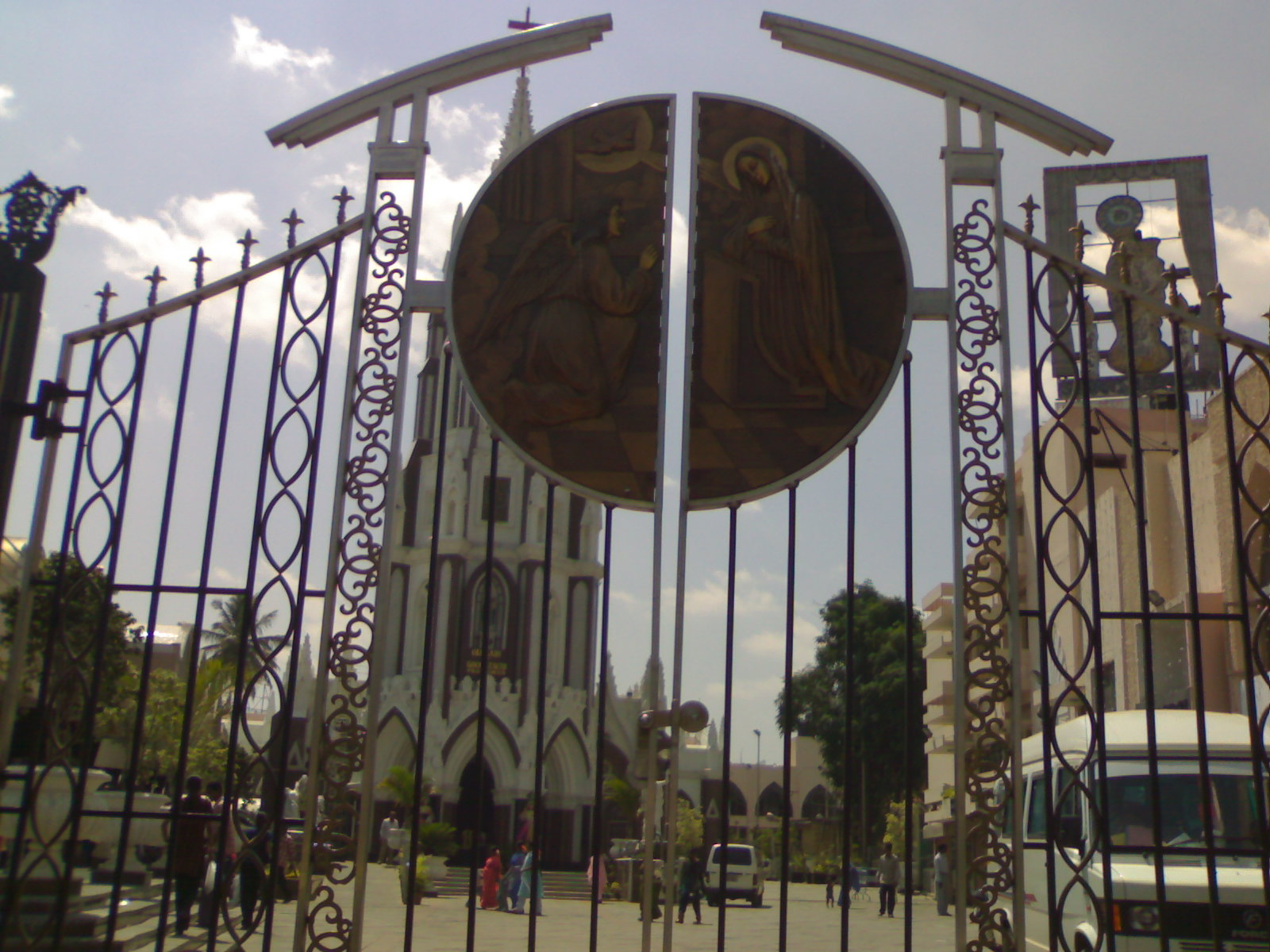
Church gate

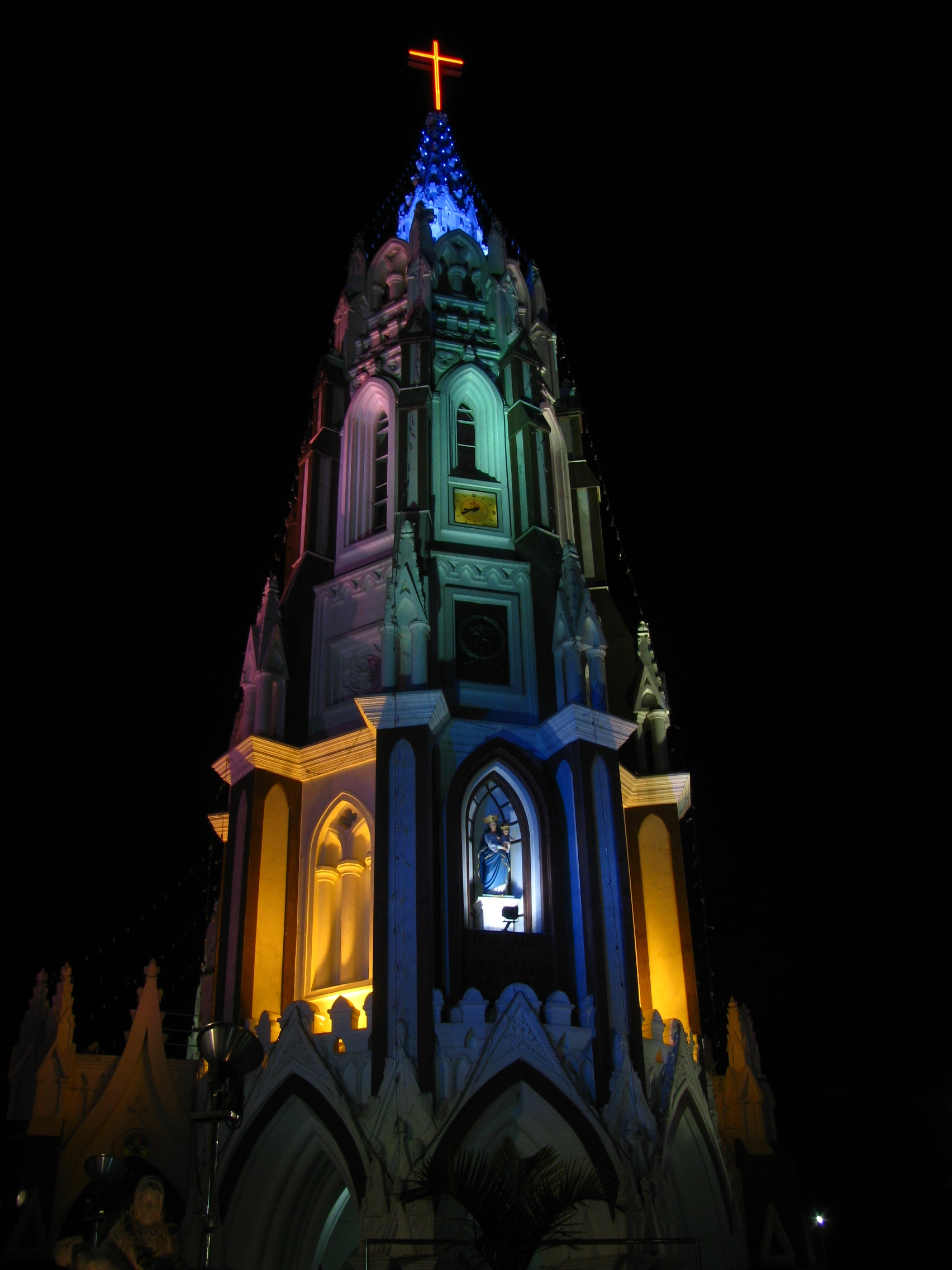
At night
