= Shrines to Mary, mother of Jesus =

Marian shrines

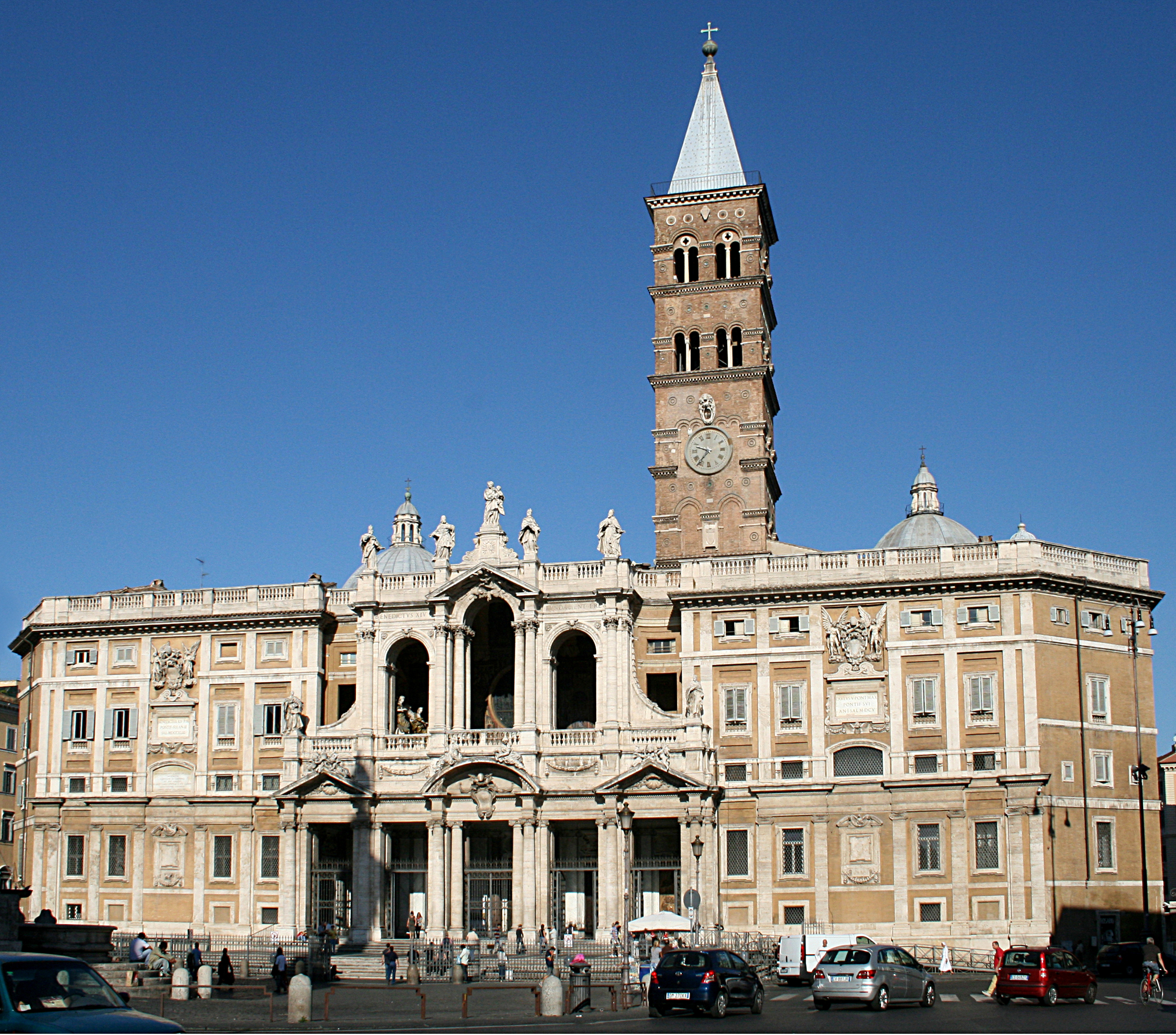
Façade of the Basilica di Santa Maria Maggiore in Rome, Italy

A Shrine to Mary, mother of Jesus, or Marian shrine, is a shrine marking an apparition or other miracle ascribed to the Blessed Virgin Mary, or a site centered on historically strong Marian devotions. Such places are often the destinations of Christian pilgrimages.

== Albania ==
- Sanctuary of Our Lady of Good Counsel, Shkodër

== Algeria ==
- Notre Dame d'Afrique, Algiers

== Andorra ==
- Our Lady of Meritxell

== Argentina ==
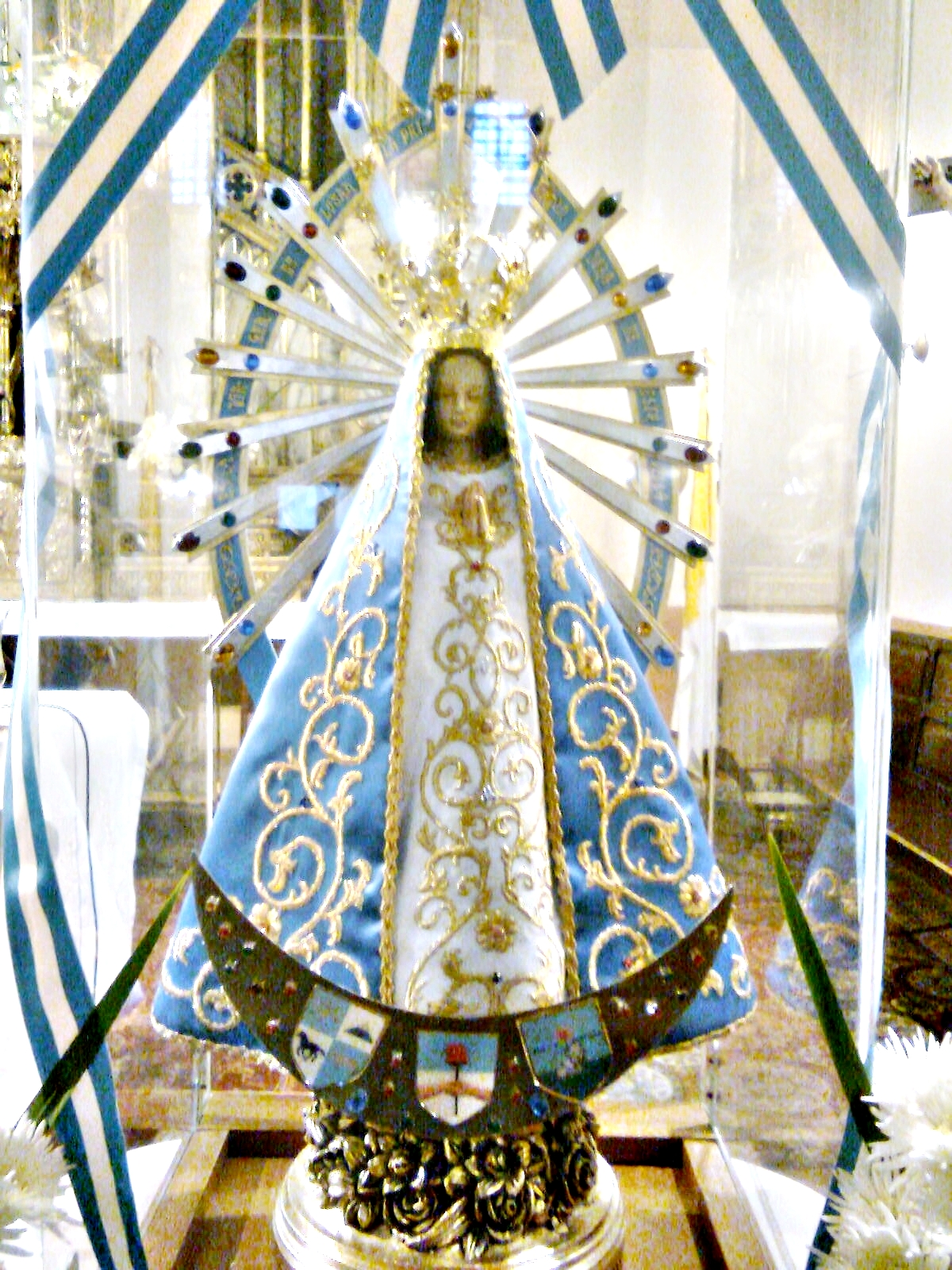
Our Lady of Luján at the Basilica of Our Lady of Luján in Argentina

- Our Lady of Luján, Luján, Buenos Aires Province
- Our Lady of the Rosary of San Nicolás, San Nicolás de los Arroyos
- Our Lady of Itatí, Itatí, Corrientes

== Australia ==
- Shrine of Our Lady of Yankalilla, South Australia
- Shrine of Our Lady of Mercy, Penrose Park, New South Wales
- Marian Valley, Shrine of Our Lady Help of Christians, Canungra, Queensland

== Austria ==
- Basilika Maria Plain, Bergheim, Salzburg
- Maria Schmolln, Braunau am Inn District, Upper Austria
- Maria Taferl, Melk District, Lower Austria
- Mariatrost Basilica, Graz, Styria
- Mariazell Basilica, Mariazell, Styria
- Marienbasilika Absam, Absam, Tirol

== Belgium ==
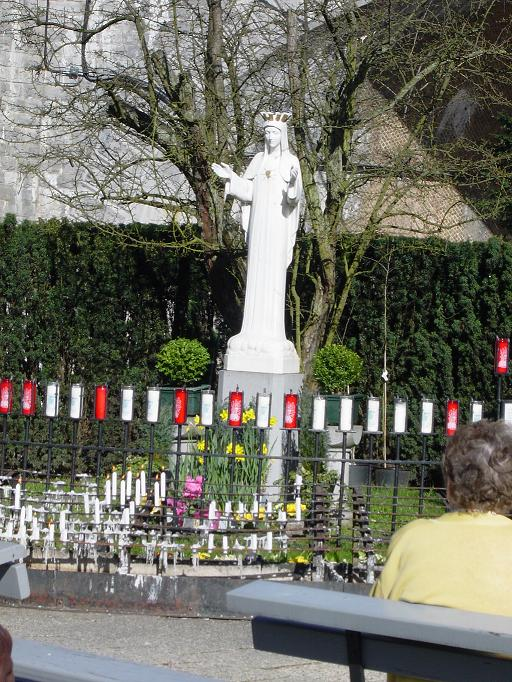
Our Lady of Beauraing

- Our Lady of Banneux in Banneux, Liège Province
- Our Lady of Beauraing in Beauraing, Namur Province
- Holy Virgin in Halle, Flemish Brabant
- Basilica of Our Lady of Lourdes, Oostakker, East Flanders
- Our Lady of Scherpenheuvel, Flemish Brabant
- Onze-Lieve-Vrouwebasiliek, Virgin of Joy, Tongeren, Limburg
- Our Lady of Tongre, in Tongre-Notre-Dame, Hainaut Province

== Bolivia ==
- Basilica of Our Lady of Copacabana, Copacabana

== Bosnia and Herzegovina ==
- Our Lady of Medjugorje in Međugorje
- Our Lady of Olovo in Olovo

== Brazil ==
- Basilica of the National Shrine of Our Lady of Aparecida, Aparecida
- Basilica and Hermitage of Our Lady of Sorrows, Caeté

== Canada ==
- Our Lady of the Cape at Notre-Dame-du-Cap Basilica in Cap-de-la-Madeleine, Quebec
- Our Lady of Sorrows Ukrainian Catholic Shrine, Cudworth, Saskatchewan
- The Shrine Church of Our Lady of the Rockies, Canmore, Alberta
- For a complete list, see footnote

== Chile ==
- Basilica of Our Lady of Mount Carmel, Maipú
- Sanctuary of Our Lady of Mount Carmel, La Tirana
- Sanctuary of the Immaculate Conception, San Cristóbal Hill
- Basilica of Our Lady of Andacollo, Andacollo

== China ==
- National Shrine of Our Lady of China in Donglu
- Basilica of Holy Mary, the Help of Christians in Sheshan
- The Church of Our Lady of the Rosary in Longtian
- The Church of Our Lady of Lourdes in Qingyang

== Colombia ==
- Sanctuary of Our Lady of the Holy Rosary of Las Lajas, Ipiales, Nariño Department
- Basilica of Our Lady of the Rosary of Chiquinquirá, Chiquinquirá, Boyacá Department

== Costa Rica ==
- Basílica de Nuestra Señora de los Ángeles, Cartago

== Croatia ==
- Our Lady of Marija Bistrica in Marija Bistrica
- Our Lady of Trsat in Rijeka
- Our Lady of Sinj in Sinj
- Our Lady of Aljmaš in Aljmaš

== Cuba ==
- Our Lady of Charity, El Cobre, near Santiago de Cuba,
- Our Lady of Candelaria:

== Cyprus ==
- Kykkos Monastery

== Czech Republic ==
- Pilgrimage Basilica of the Visitation of Our Lady, Hejnice
- Basilica of the Assumption of Our Lady - Black Madonna of Brno

== Dominican Republic ==
- Basílica Catedral Nuestra Señora de la Altagracia in Higüey, La Altagracia, Dominican Republic.

== Ecuador ==
- National Shrine of Our Lady of El Cisne (Nuestra Señora de el Cisne), in El Cisne, Loja, Ecuador.
- National Shrine of Our Lady of the Presentation of El Quinche, El Quinche, Pichincha Province

== Egypt ==
- Our Lady of Warraq
- Our Lady of Zeitoun

== France ==
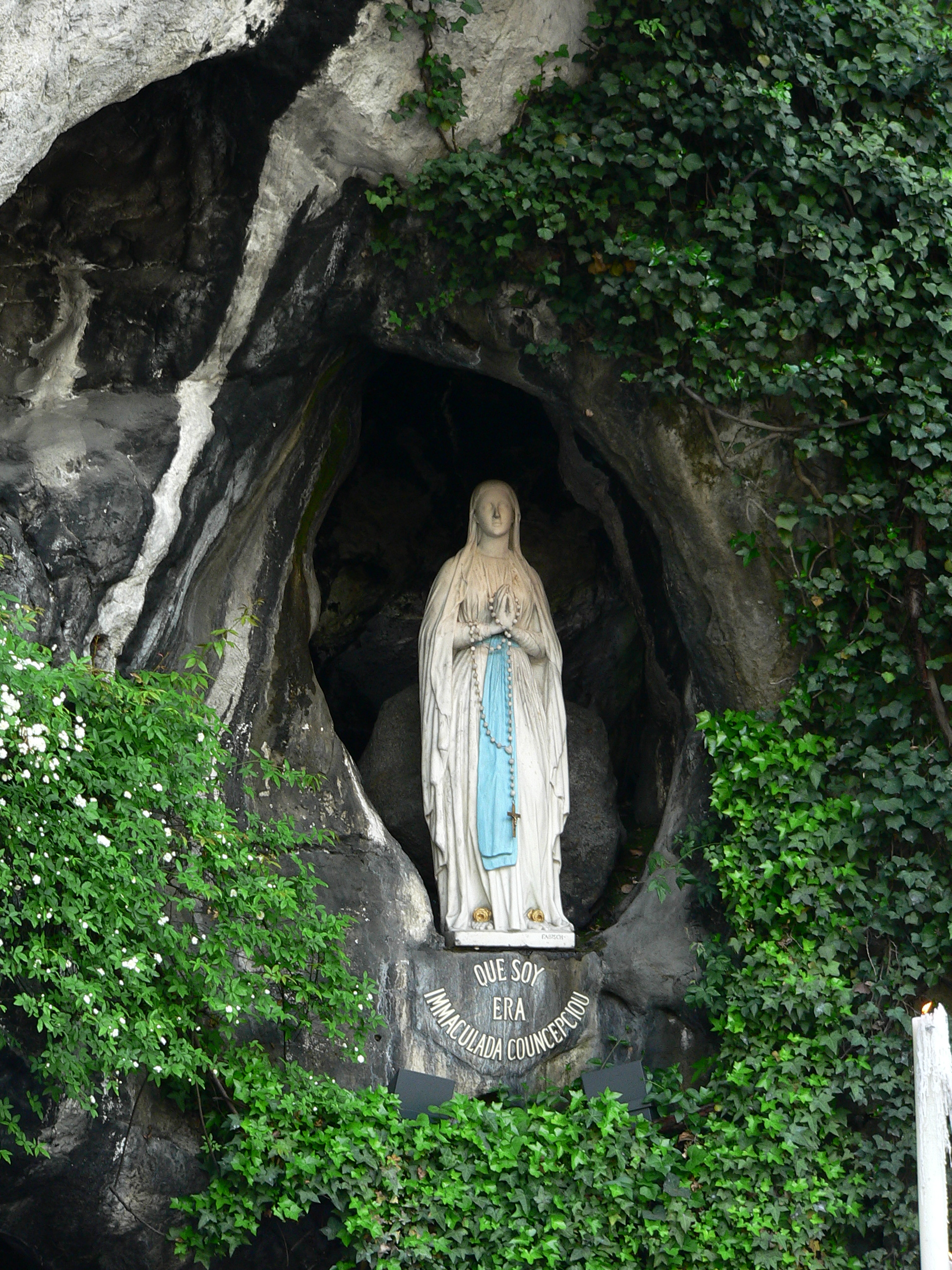
Statue of Our Lady of Lourdes in the Grotto

- Cathédrale Notre-Dame de Chartres in Chartres
- Notre Dame de La Salette in La Salette:
- Notre Dame de Bonne Délivrance in Neuilly:
- Sanctuary of Our Lady of Lourdes, in Lourdes
- The Chapel of Our Lady of the Miraculous Medal in Paris, France
- Sanctuaire Notre-Dame du Laus, Saint-Étienne-le-Laus, France

== Germany ==
- Marienschrein, in Aachen Cathedral.
- Shrine of Our Lady of Altötting, Bavaria.
- The Basilica of Our Lady of Consolation in Kevelaer, North Rhine-Westphalia.

== Gibraltar ==
- Shrine of Our Lady of Europe at Europa Point, the southernmost point in Western Europe. A shrine to Mary has existed on the site since 1462.

== Greece ==
- Our Lady of Tinos, Tinos Island, Greece's patron saint.
- Panagia Tripiti, Town of Aigio, Peloponnese
- Church of the Dormition of the Theotokos, Agiasos, Lesvos

== Guatemala ==
- The Virgin of Carmel Sanctuary, Guatemala City

== Holy Land ==
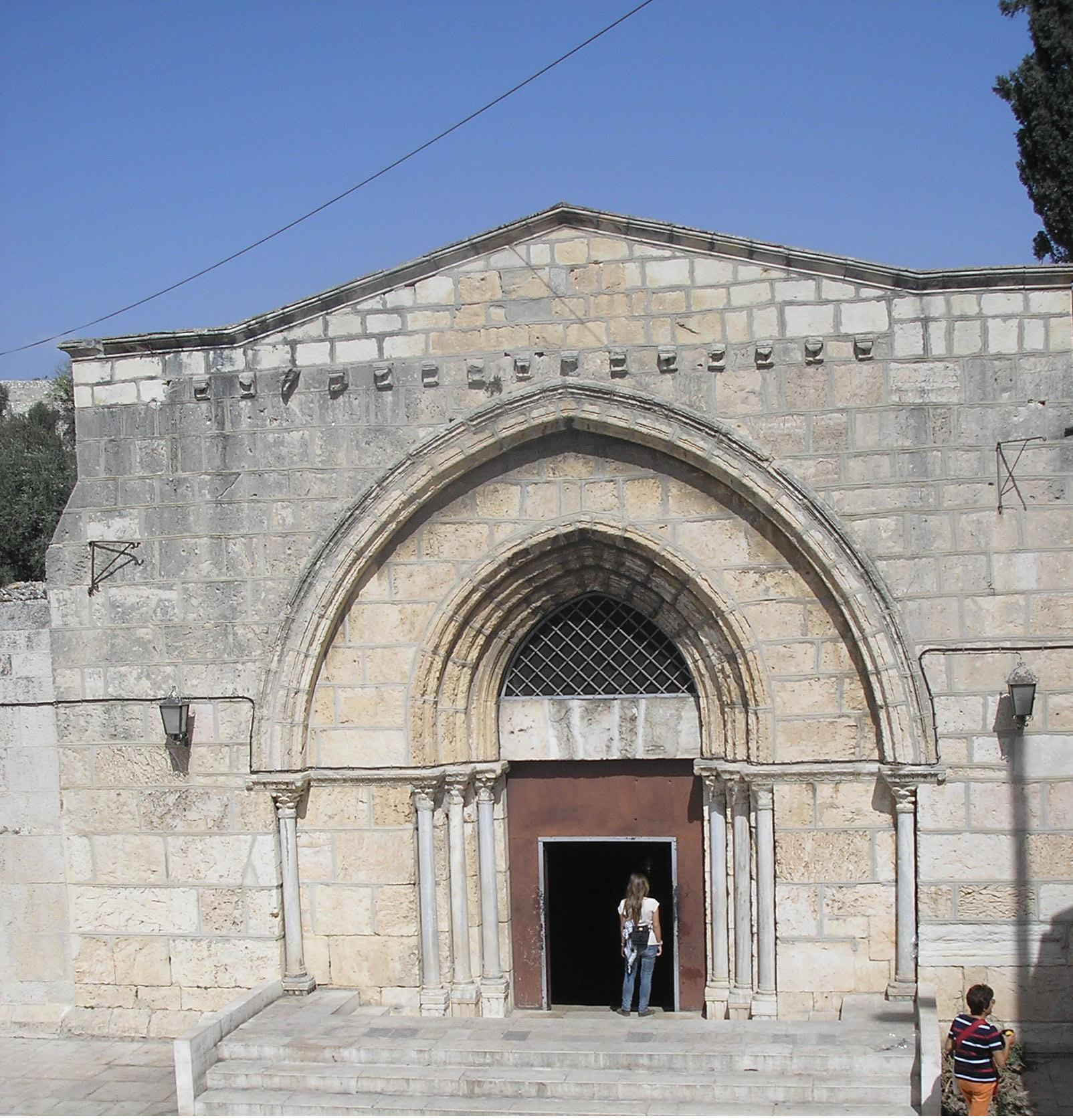
Twelfth-century façade of Mary's Tomb in the garden of Gethsemane, in Jerusalem

- The Basilica of the Annunciation, in Nazareth.
- The Abbey of the Dormition, also known as Church of the Dormition of Our Lady on Mount Zion, in Jerusalem.
- The Church of the Tomb of the Virgin Mary in the garden of Gethsemane, in Jerusalem
- Chapel of the Milk Grotto of Virgin Mary in Bethlehem

== Honduras ==
- The Basilica of Our Lady of Suyapa in Tegucigalpa, Honduras, receives approximately 1.2 million pilgrims each year on February 3.

== Hong Kong ==
- Cathedral of the Immaculate Conception

== Indonesia ==
- Graha Maria Annai Velangkanni, Medan is dedicated to Our Lady of Good Health.

== India ==
- Basilica of Our Lady of Good Health (Arokkiya Matha), Velankanni, Tamil Nadu
- Basilica of Our Lady of the Mount, Bandra, Bombay (Mumbai)
- St. Mary's Basilica, Bangalore, Bengaluru, Karnataka
- Our Lady of Snows Basilica, Tuticorin, Tamil Nadu
- Annai Velankanni Shrine, Besant Nagar, Chennai
- National Shrine Basilica of Our Lady of Ransom, Vallarpadam, Kerala
- Sardhana Basilica, Meerut, Uttar Pradesh
- St. Thomas Church, ThumpolyThumpoly, Alleppey, Kerala
- Basilica of Our Lady of Mount Carmel and Saint Joseph, Varapuzha, Kerala
- Basilica of Our Lady of Health, Harihar, Harihar, Karnataka
- Gunadala Matha Shrine (Our Lady of Lourdes), Vijayawada, Andhra Pradesh
- Shrine Of Our Lady Of Health, Khairatabad Hyderabad
- Poondi Matha Bascillica, Poondi, Tamil Nadu
- Basilica of Our Lady of Assumption, Kamanayakkanpatti, Tuticorin, Tamil Nadu
- Korattymuthy Our Lady with Poovan Bananas, St. Mary's Forane Church, Koratty, Kerala
- Vimalagiri Madha, Kottayam, Kerala
- Our Lady of Lourdes Shrine, Villianur, Villianur, Puducherry
- Vechoor Muthy, Vechoor, Kerala
- St. Mary's Syro-Malabar Church, Pallipuram| Pallipurathamma, Cherthala, Kerala
- Basilica of Our Lady of the Holy Rosary, Karumathampatti, Coimbatore, Tamil Nadu
- Basilica of the Holy Rosary, Bandel, Bandel, Kolkata
- Mokama Basilica, Mokama, Bihar
- Raja Ulhatu Basilica, Ranchi, Jharkhand
- Chemperi Basilica, Chemperi, Kerala
- Our Lady of Lourde's Church (Pallikkunnu Church), Wayanad, Kerala
- Shrine Of Our Lady Of Remedies, Vasai, Maharashtra
- Grotto Shrine of Our Lady of Lourdes, Seminary Hills,Nagpur, Maharashtra
- Unteshwari Maria Mata Mandir, Gandhinagar, Gujarat
- Shrine of Mother of the Forsaken Church, Baroda, Gujarat
- Shrine of Mother of the Forsaken Church, Khambholaj,Gujarat
- Shrine of Our Lady of Sacred Heart, Ross Hill Church, Vizag, Andhra Pradesh
- Amalolbava Matha, Immaculate Conception Church,Kollam, Kerala
- Our Lady of Immaculate Conception Church, Manjummel, Ernakulam, Kerala
- Swargaropithamatha, Our lady's Assumption Church, Vlathankara,Neyyattinkara, Kerala
- Sindhuyathra Madha, Our lady of good voyage church, Vizhinjam, Trivandrum, Kerala
- Pattumala Madha, Velankanni Madha Church,Vagamon, Kerala
- St Mary's Cathedral, Manarcaud
- St. Mary's Church Meenangadi
- Major Archiepiscopal Marth Mariam Archdeacon Pilgrim Church, Kuravilangad
- Nagapuzhamma, St. Mary's Syro-Malabar Church, Nakapuzha,Kothamangalam, Kerala
- Nediyalamma, St Mary's Church Nediyasala,Thodupuzha, Kerala
- Rajakumariamma, Devamatha Church,Rajakumari, Idukki, Kerala
- Edooramma, Edoor, Kerala
- Kreupasanam Marian Shrine, Kalavoor,Alleppey, Kerala

== Ireland ==
- Sanctuary of Our Lady of Knock in Knock, Ireland
- Our Lady of Dublin at Whitefriars Street Carmelite Church, Dublin
- Our Lady of Perpetual Help at Clonard Monastery in Belfast.

== Italy ==
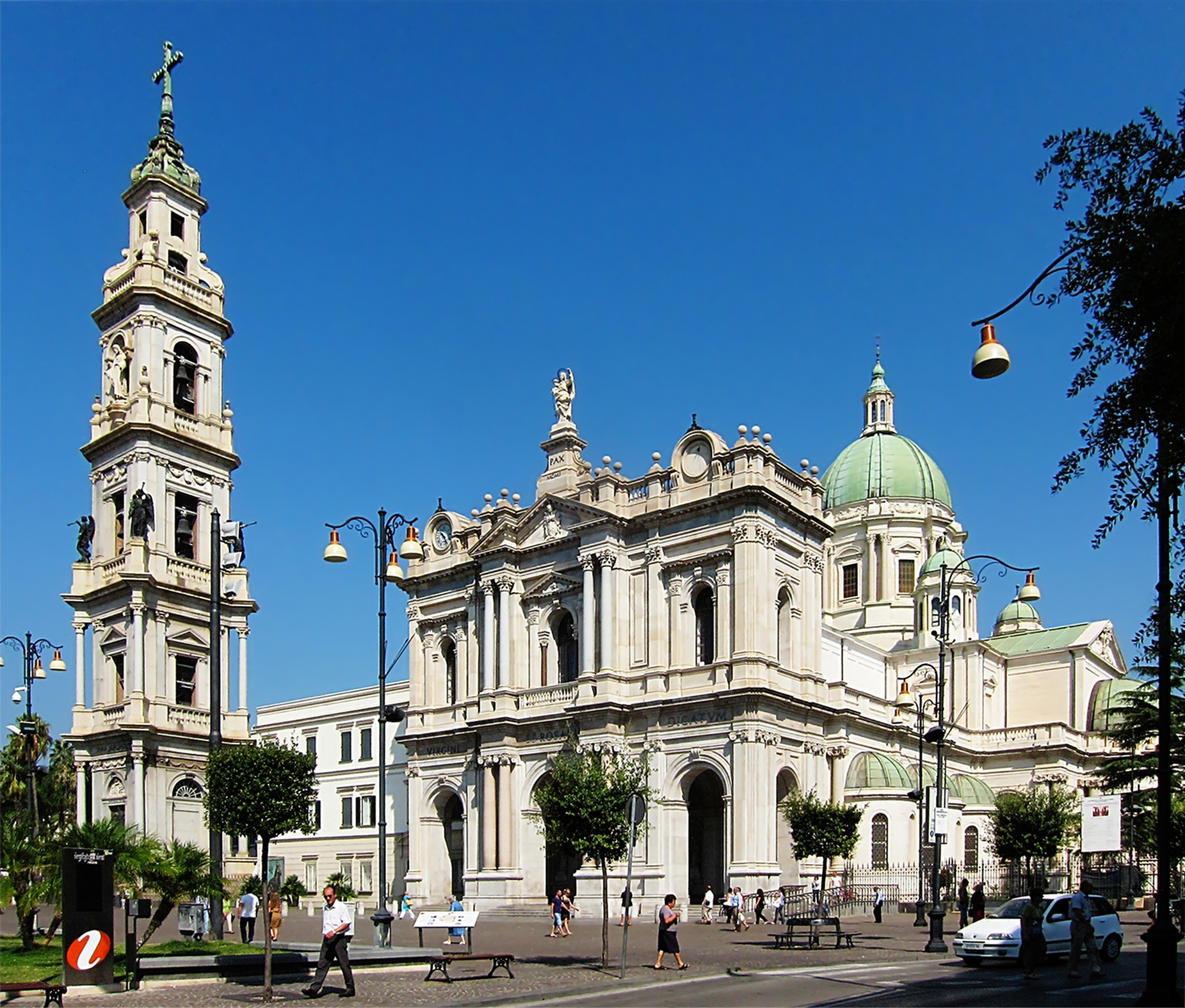
The shrine dedicated to the Blessed Virgin Mary in Pompei, Italy

- Basilica di Santa Maria Maggiore, Rome, home of the Salus Populi Romani icon
- Holy Mary of Third Millennium at Three Fountains, Rome
- Sanctuary and Sacro Monte di Oropa, Biella, Piedmont
- Santuario di Barbana, Grado, Friuli-Venezia Giulia
- Sanctuary of Macereto, Parco Nazionale dei Monti Sibillini, Marche
- Sanctuary of Our Lady of the Crown, Caprino Veronese, Veneto
- Shrine of Our Lady of Bonaria, Cagliari, Sardinia
- Shrine of the Virgin of the Rosary of Pompei, Pompei, Campania
- Basilica della Santa Casa, Loreto, Marche
- Sanctuary of Our Lady of Montallegro, Rapallo, Liguria
- Shrine of Santa Maria del Fonte, Caravaggio, Lombardia
- Shrine of Our Lady of Tears, Syracuse, Sicily

== Japan ==
- Our Lady of Akita, Akita, Japan

== Kenya ==
- Mary mother of God, Komarock, Machakos

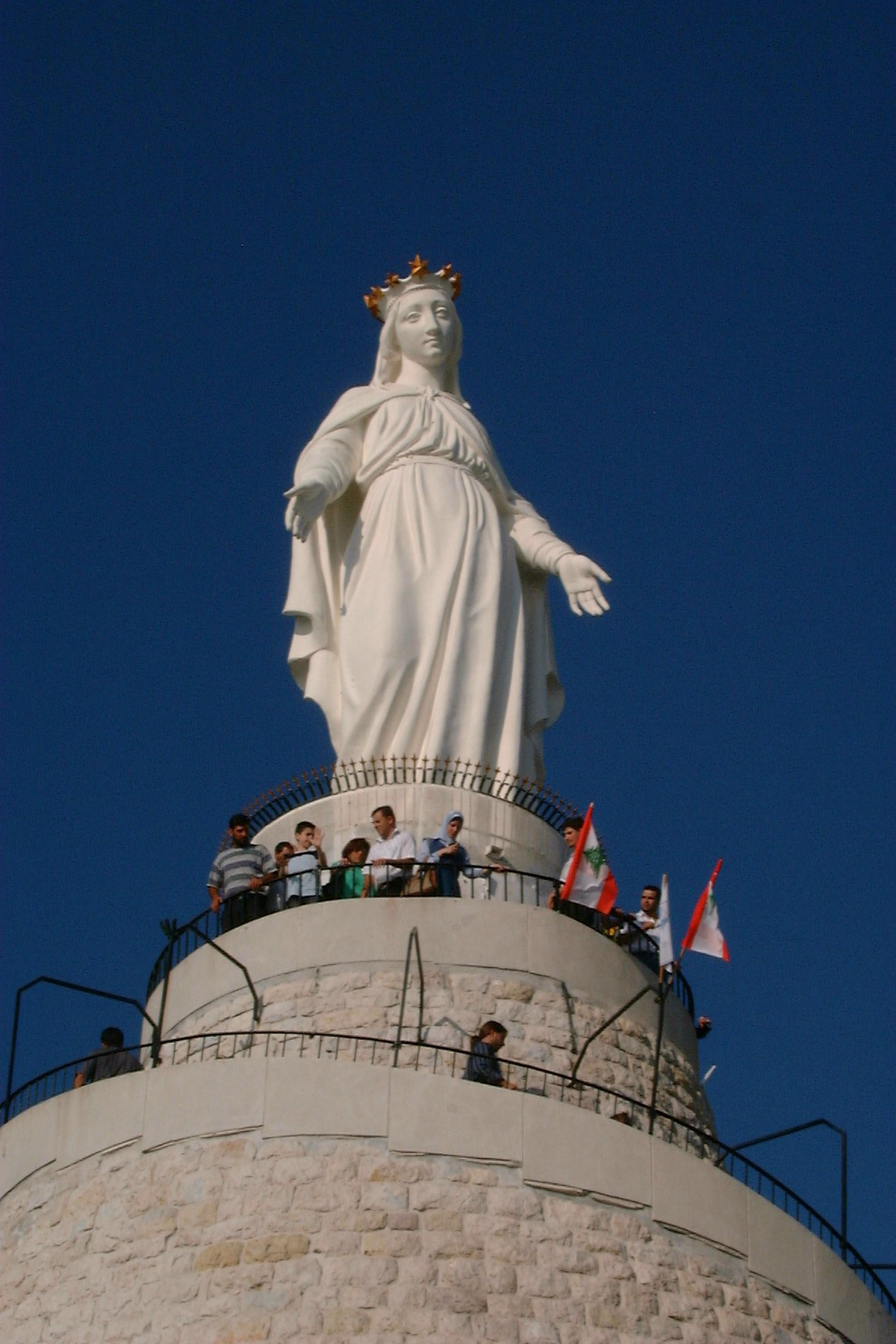
Our Lady of Lebanon, Harissa, Lebanon

== Lebanon ==
- Our Lady of Ain Ebel - Em El Nour in Ain Ebel, a 200-foot tower to be topped by a 45-foot statue of the Virgin Mary
- Our Lady of Bechouat, a Marian sanctuary in the Beqaa Valley of Lebanon.
- Our Lady of Bekaa, a Marian shrine located in Zahlé, Lebanon with panoramic views of the Beqaa Valley.
- Our Lady of the Waterfall, a Marian shrine in Jezzine, Lebanon
- Our Lady of Lebanon, a Marian shrine in Harissa, Lebanon
- Our Lady of Lourdes Monument, Ain Ebel, Lebanon
- Our Lady of Mantara, a Marian shrine in Maghdouché, Lebanon
- Our Lady of Miziara, Mother of Mercies, Zgharta, Lebanon
- Our Lady of Nourieh, a Marian shrine and monastery atop Theoprosopon in Hamat, Lebanon.
- Our Lady of the Wind, Enfeh, Lebanon

== Lithuania ==
- Our Lady of the Gate of Dawn in Vilnius, Lithuania
- Church of the Assumption of the Blessed Virgin Mary, in Pivasiunai, Lithuania
- Our Lady of Šiluva in Siluva
- Church of the Visitation of the Blessed Virgin Mary in Trakai
- Žemaičių Kalvarija, Lithuania

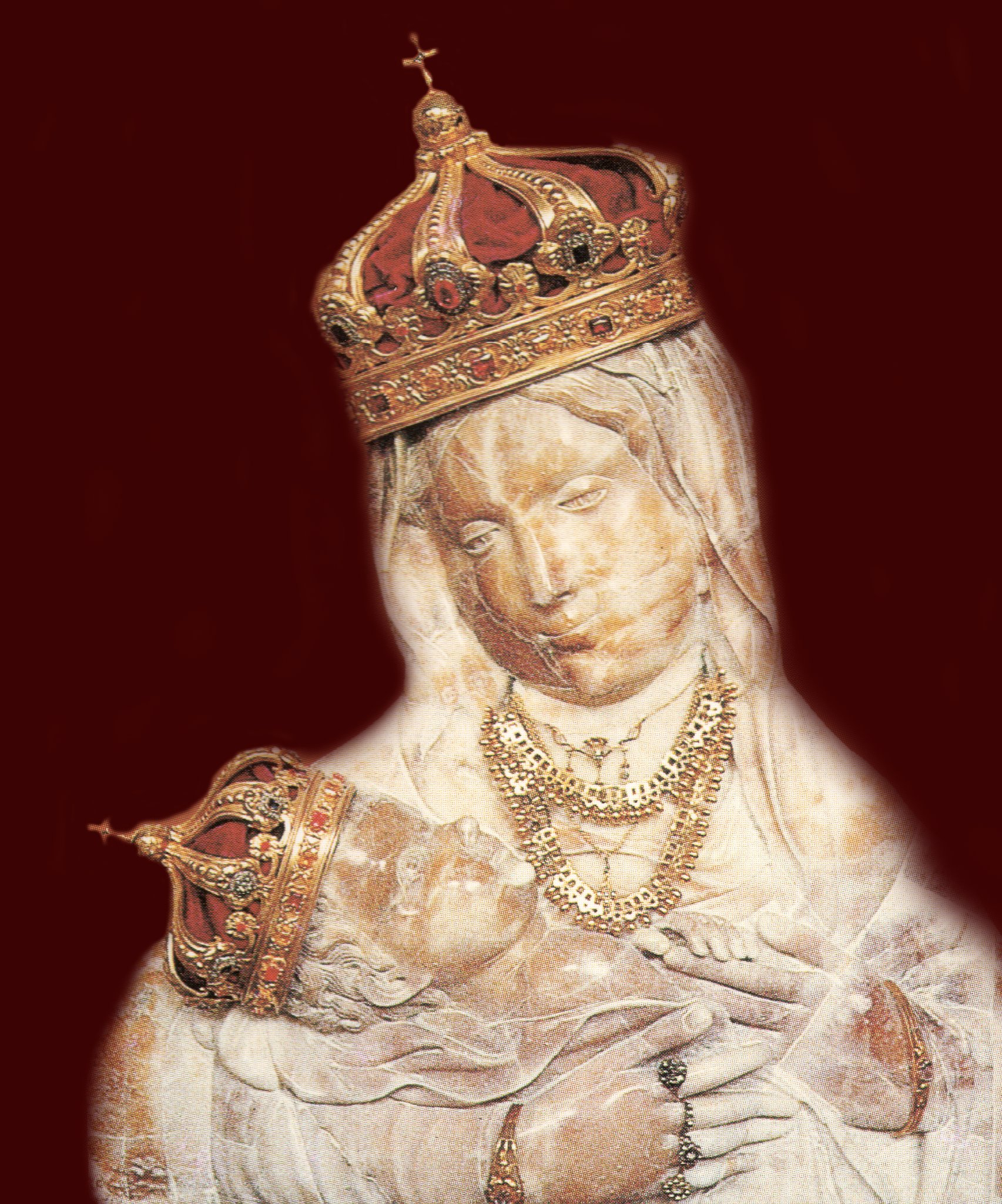
Our Lady of the Grotto, Rabat, Malta

== Malta ==
- Sanctuary of Our Lady of Tal-Ħerba in Birkirkara
- Sanctuary of Our Lady of Mellieħa in Mellieħa
- Shrine of Our Lady of the Grotto inside Saint Dominic's Church in Rabat
- Sanctuary and Basilica of Our Lady of Mount Carmel in Valletta
- Sanctuary of the Blessed Virgin of Ta' Pinu in Għarb, Gozo
- Sanctuary and Basilica of Our Lady of Victories in Senglea

== Malaysia ==
- Chapel of Our Lady of Good Health (Annai Vailankanni) Kampung Pandan Kuala Lumpur. Website: http://www.sacredheartkl.org/

== Mexico ==
- The Basilica of Guadalupe in Mexico City, Mexico
- Basilica of San Juan de los Lagos in San Juan de los Lagos, Jalisco, Mexico
- Basilica of Our Lady of Zapopan, Zapopan, Jalisco*
- Shrine of Our Lady of Juquila, Santa Catarina Juquila, Oaxaca
- Sanctuary of the virgin of Candelaria, Tlacotalpan, Veracruz

== Monaco ==
- Cathedral of Our Lady Immaculate in Monaco City, Principality of Monaco

== Montenegro ==
- Our Lady of the Rocks, Perast

== Netherlands ==
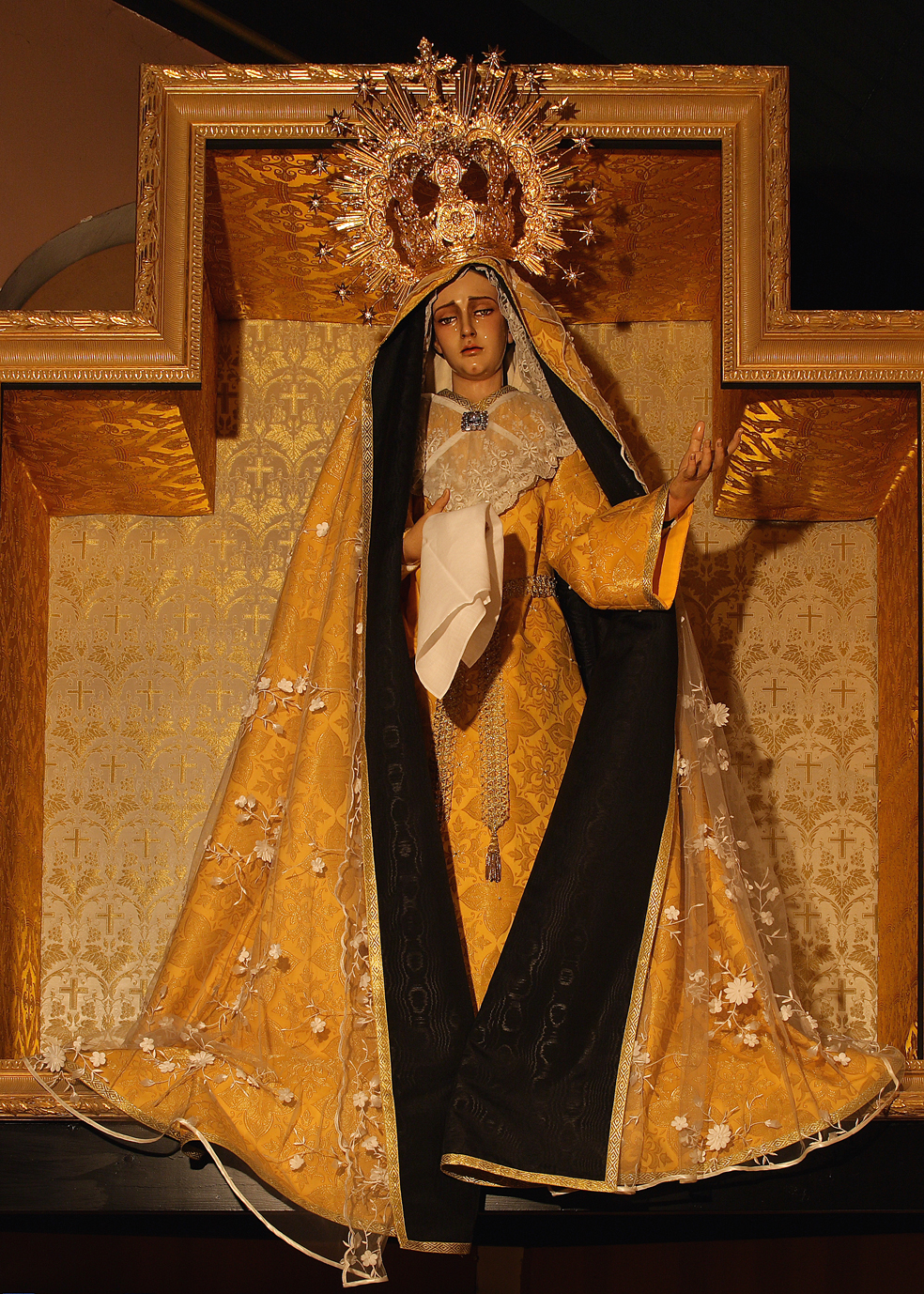
Sorrowful Mother of Warfhuizen

- Our Lady Star of the Sea, Maastricht
- Our Lady the Sweet Mother, 's-Hertogenbosch, St. John's Cathedral
- Our Lady of Handel, Handel
- The Lady of All Nations, Amsterdam
- Our Lady Wealth of Joys, Oirschot
- Basilica of Our Lady of the Sacred Heart, Sittard
- Our Lady at Peril, Heiloo
- Our Lady of the Enclosed Garden, Warfhuizen
- Our Lady under the Limes, Uden
- Our Lady of Ommel, Ommel
- Our Lady under the Limes, Thorn
- Our Lady of Frieswijk, Schalkhaar
- Our Lady of Oud-Zevenaar, Oud Zevenaar
- Our Lady of Bolsward, Bolsward
- Our Lady of Leeuwarden, Leeuwarden
- Our Lady ter Weeghe, Haastrecht
- Our Lady of the sand, Roermond
- Our Lady of Schilberg, Echt
- Our Lady of Haarlem, Haarlem
- Our Lady of Eiteren, IJsselstein
- Our Lady in the Oak, Meerveldhoven
- Our Lady of Aarle-Rixtel, Aarle-Rixtel

== Nicaragua ==
- San Francisco de Cuapa
- Catedral de León (Nicaragua)

== Pakistan ==
- National Marian Shrine, Mariamabad

== Peru ==
- Shrine of the Virgin of Chapi, Polobaya District, Arequipa province

== Philippines ==
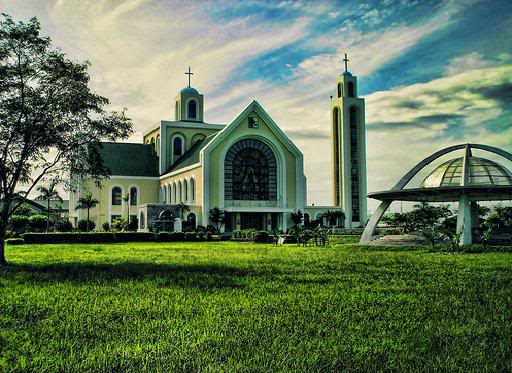
Minor Basilica of Our Lady of Peñafrancia

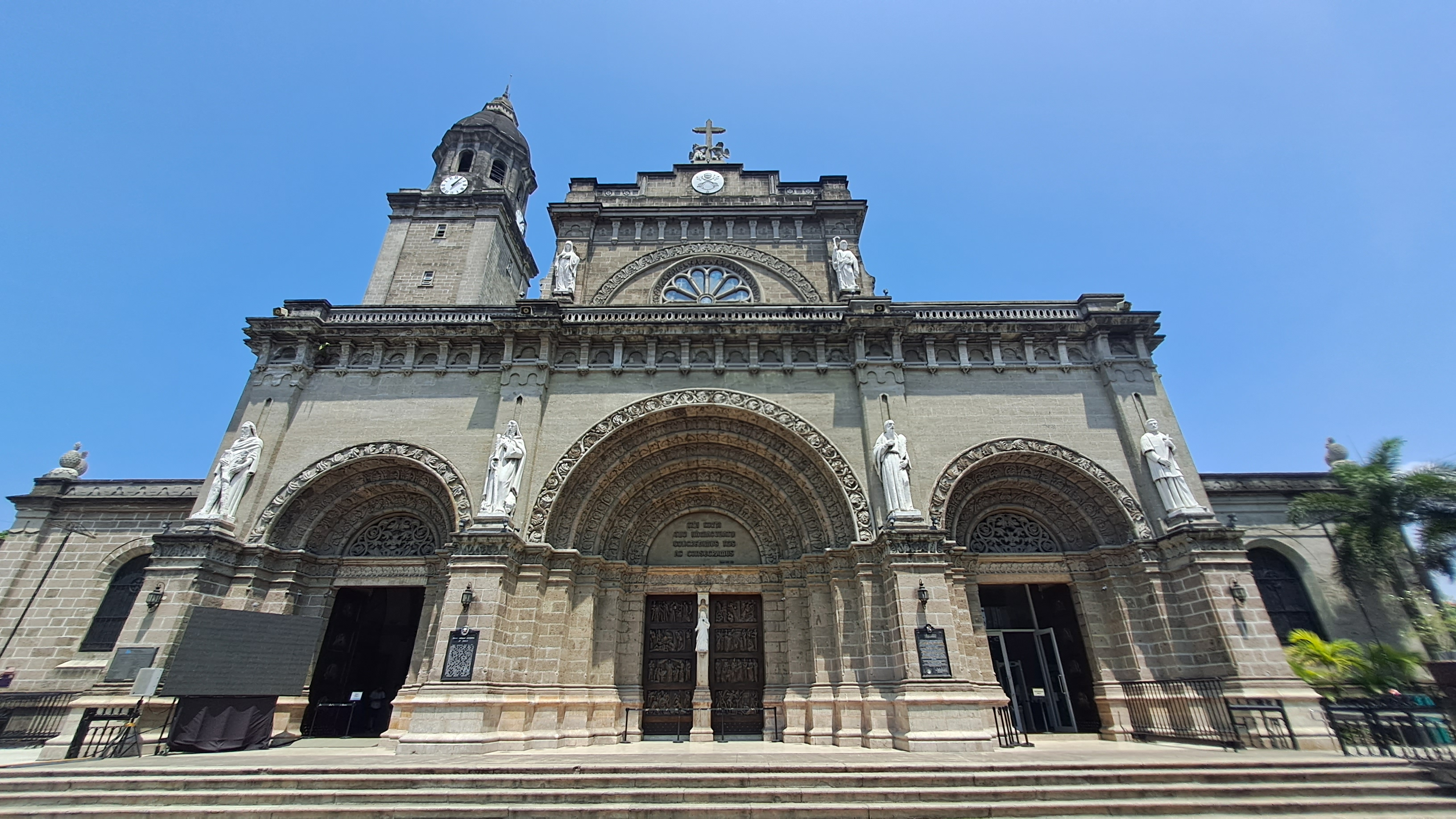
Manila Cathedral

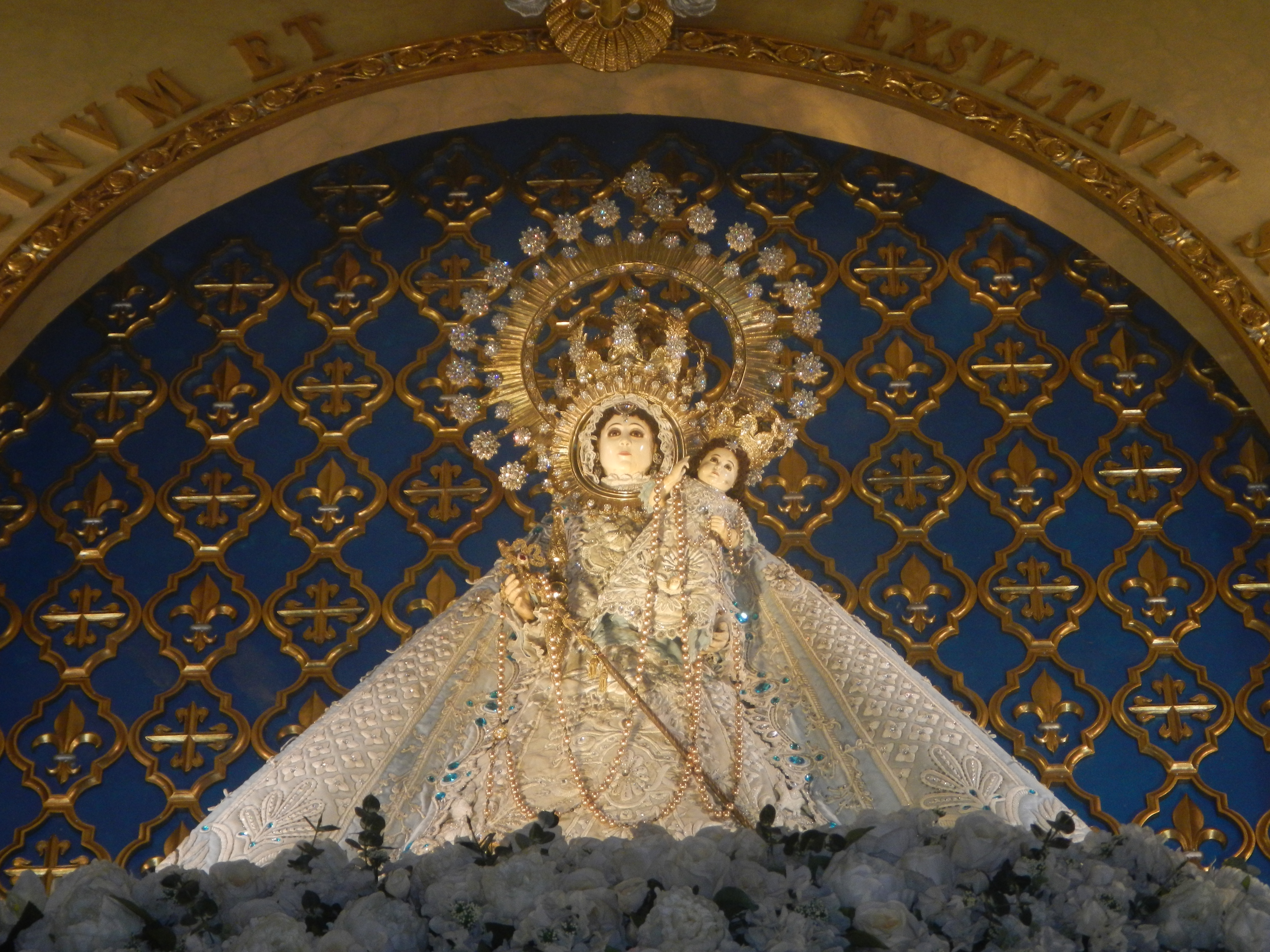
Our Lady of the Holy Rosary of La Naval de Manila

- Minor Basilica and Metropolitan Cathedral of the Immaculate Conception, Intramuros, Manila
- National Shrine of Our Mother of Perpetual Help, Baclaran, Parañaque
- National Shrine of Our Lady of the Miraculous Medal, Sucat, Muntinlupa
- National Shrine of Our Lady of the Holy Rosary of La Naval, Quezon City
- Archdiocesan Shrine of Nuestra Señora de Consolacion y Correa (San Agustin Church), Intramuros, Manila
- Virgen de los Remedios de Pampanga, Arzopispado de Pampanga, San Fernando, Pampanga
- National Shrine of Our Lady of Covadonga (San Jose Parish Church) La Trinidad, Benguet
- Our Lady, Mary Mediatrix of All Grace, Carmelite Monastery, Lipa, Batangas
- Archdiocesan Shrine of Our Lady of Caysasay, Taal, Batangas
- Minor Basilica of Our Lady of Visitation of Piat, Piat, Cagayan
- Minor Basilica of Our Lady of Peñafrancia, Naga, Camarines Sur
- Minor Basilica and Cathedral of Our Lady of Immaculate Conception, Malolos, Bulacan
- Shrine of Mary, Queen of Peace (EDSA Shrine), Mandaluyong
- Archdiocesan Shrine of Our Lady of Loreto, Sampaloc, Manila
- Archdiocesan Shrine of Nuestra Señora de Guia, Ermita, Manila
- Archdiocesan Shrine of Our Lady of Peñafrancia, Paco, Manila
- Basilica of Our Lady of Manaoag, Manaoag, Pangasinan
- Minor Basilica of Mary, Help of Christians, Better Living Subdivision, Parañaque
- Immaculate Conception Cathedral, Pasig
- Immaculate Conception Cathedral of Cubao, Quezon City
- Basilica of the National Shrine of Our Lady of Mt. Carmel, New Manila, Quezon City
- National Shrine of Our Lady of Mercy, Novaliches, Quezon City
- National Shrine of Our Lady of Lourdes, Quezon City
- International Shrine of Our Lady of Peace and Good Voyage, Antipolo, Rizal
- National Shrine of Our Lady of Aranzazu, San Mateo, Rizal
- Diocesan Shrine of Our Lady of Abandoned, Marikina
- Diocesan Shrine of Our Lady of Light, Cainta, Rizal
- Diocesan Shrine of Our Lady of the Holy Rosary, Cardona, Rizal
- Diocesan Shrine of Our Lady of Salvation, Joroan, Tiwi, Albay
- National Shrine of Our Lady of the Rule, Lapu-Lapu, Cebu
- Archdiocesan Shrine of Our Lady of Guadalupe de Cebu, Guadalupe, Cebu City
- Our Lady of the Pillar, Fort Pilar, Zamboanga City
- National Shrine of Our Lady of Fatima, Marulas, Valenzuela
- National Shrine of Our Lady of the Abandoned, Santa Ana, Manila
- Minor Basilica of Our Lady of Charity, Agoo, La Union
- Shrine of Our Lady of Charity (Saint Augustine Parish Church) Bantay, Ilocos Sur
- Minor Basilica and Archdiocesan Shrine of Our Lady of the Assumption, Santa Maria, Ilocos Sur
- Our Lady of the Good Event, Cathedral Parish of St. Andrew, Parañaque
- Cathedral of Our Lady of the Pillar, Imus, Cavite
- Immaculate Concepcion Parish Church, Dasmariñas, Cavite
- National Shrine of Our Lady of La Salette, Biga II, Silang, Cavite
- Nuestra Señora de la Soledad de Porta Vaga (San Roque Church) Cavite City
- Diocesan Shrine of Nuestra Señora de los Dolores de Turumba, Pakil, Laguna
- Diocesan Shrine of Our Lady of Guadalupe in Extremadura, Loboc, Bohol
- National Shrine of La Virgen Divina Pastora (Three Kings Parish), Gapan, Nueva Ecija
- Shrine of La Virgen Milagrosa de Badoc Coronada, Badoc, Ilocos Norte
- National Shrine of Our Lady of Sorrows, Dolores, Quezon Province.
- National Shrine and Cathedral Parish of Our Lady of the Assumption, Maasin City, Southern Leyte
- Our Lady of the Triumph of the Cross, Fuerte de la Concepcion y del Triunfo, Ozamiz City, Misamis Occidental

== Poland ==
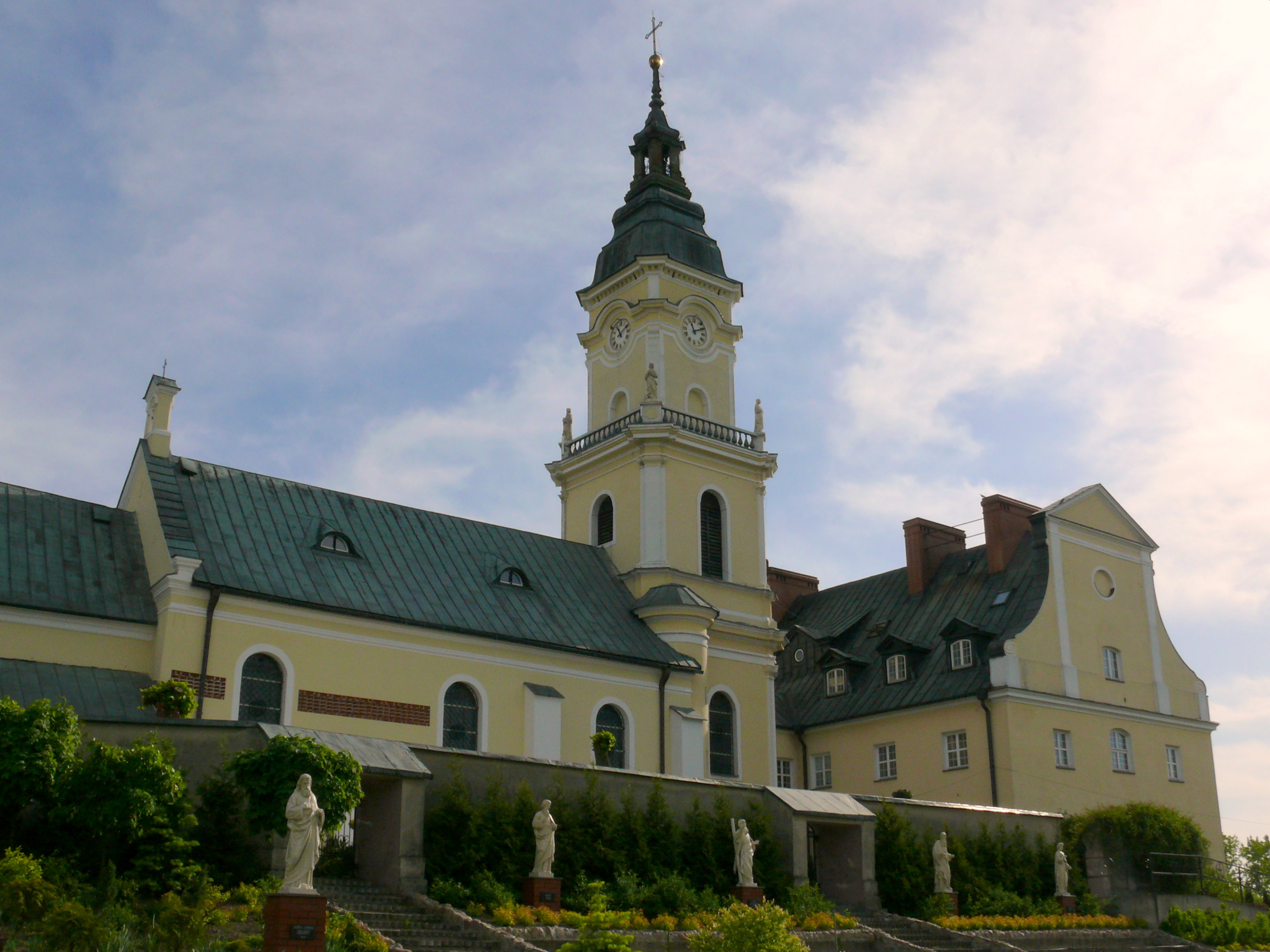
The Sanctuary of Victoriaus Our Lady in Brdów (Poland)

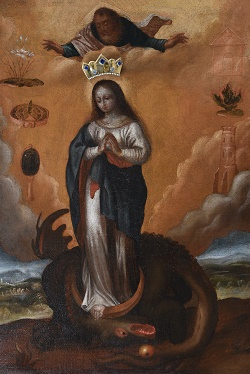
Miraculous Icon of Our Lady of Tartaków in Blessed Virgin Mary Queen of Poland Church in Łukawiec.

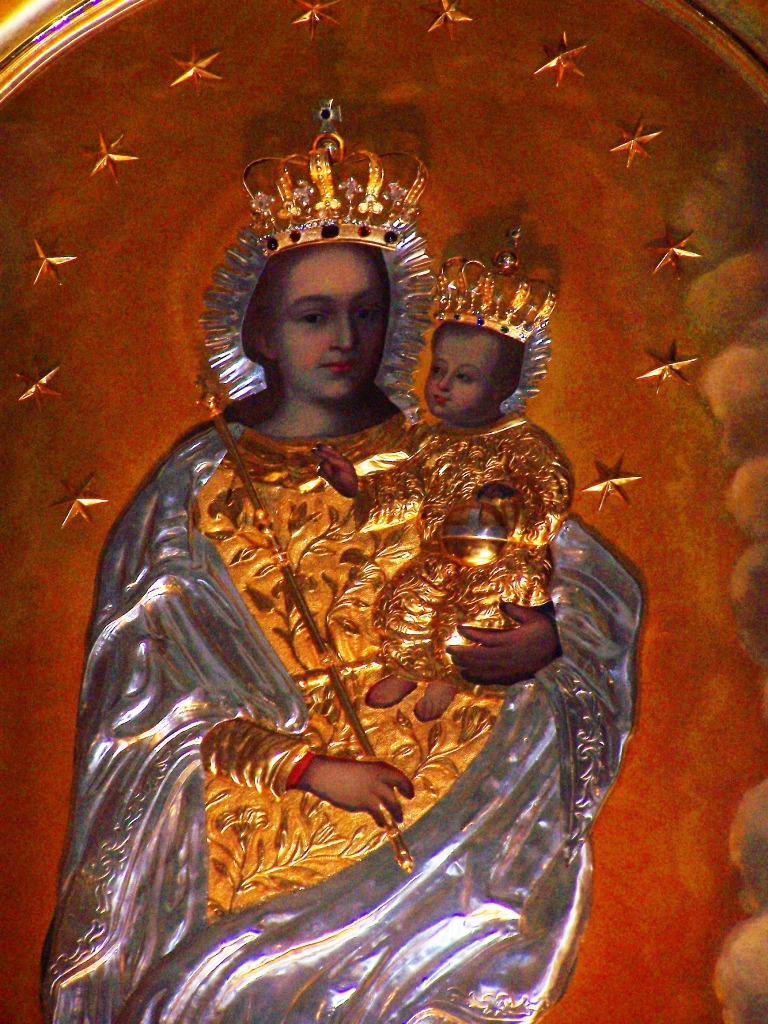
Miraculous Icon of Our Lady of Consolation in Bernardine Monastery in Przeworsk

Marian Sanctuaries in Poland
Locality	Church	Relic or Object
Bardo	Church of the Visitiation of our Lady. Redemptorists	Sculpture of our lady from the 12th century ., crowned 3 July 1966. (abp Bolesław Kominek)
Biechowo	Church of the Immaculate Conception Paulists	Icon of Our Lady of Joy MB from the 15th century crowned 12 September 1976. by (cardinal. Stefan Wyszyński)
Bochnia	Church of St. Nicholas	Icon of Our Lady from the 15th-16th century, crowned in 1931.
Borek Stary	Monastery of the Assumption of the Blessed Virgin Mary	obraz MB Borkowskiej z Dzieciątkiem, crowned on 15 August 1919
Brdów	Pauline Fathers Monastery	Icon of Victoriaus Our Lady, crowned in 1983
Częstochowa	Jasna Góra Monastery	The Black Madonna of Częstochowa, crowned on 8 September 1717
Gniezno	Franciscan church and monastery in Gniezno	Virgin Mary of Consolation, the Lady of Gniezno
Kalwaria Zebrzydowska	Kalwaria Zebrzydowska park	Our Lady of Calvary
Kodeń	The Missionary Oblates of Mary Immaculate Monastery of Saint Ann	Icon of Our Lady, Mother of Unity
Krzeszów, Lower Silesian Voivodeship	Basilica of the Assumption of the Blessed Virgin Mary in Krzeszów	Icon of Our Lady, Mother of Grace
Licheń Stary	The Sanctuary of Our Lady of Licheń	Icon of Our Lady of Sorrows
Łukawiec	The Sanctuary od Our Lady of Łukawiec	Icon of Our Lady of Łukawiec (Tartaków) from 17th century, crowned on 3 June 1991
Niepokalanów	The Franciscan Basilica of Omni-mediatress of All Glories	Figure of Our Lady of Omni-mediatress of All Glories
Przeworsk	The Bernardine Monastery of Saint Barbara	Icon of Our Lady of Consolation from the 17th century
Różanystok	The Salesian Church	Icon of Our Lady, Help of Christians
Rychwałd, Silesian Voivodeship	Minor basilica of Rychwałd - Sanctuary in Rychwałd	Madonna and Child - Our Lady of Rychwałd
Stara Błotnica	Church of the Immaculate Conception	Icon of Our Lady from the 16th century crowned in 1977.
Stoczek Klasztorny	Former Bernardine Church	Icon of Our Lady Queen of Peace
Święta Lipka	Basilica of the Visitation - Sanctuary of Saint Mary	Madonna and Child - Our Lady of Swięta Lipka
Wąwolnica	Basilica of St. Adalbert	Virgin Kębelska -Figure of the Virgin Mary with the baby Christ

== Portugal ==
The Sanctuary of Our Lady of Fátima, in Portugal, is one of the most famous Marian shrines in the world

Sanctuary of Saint Mary of Alcobaça

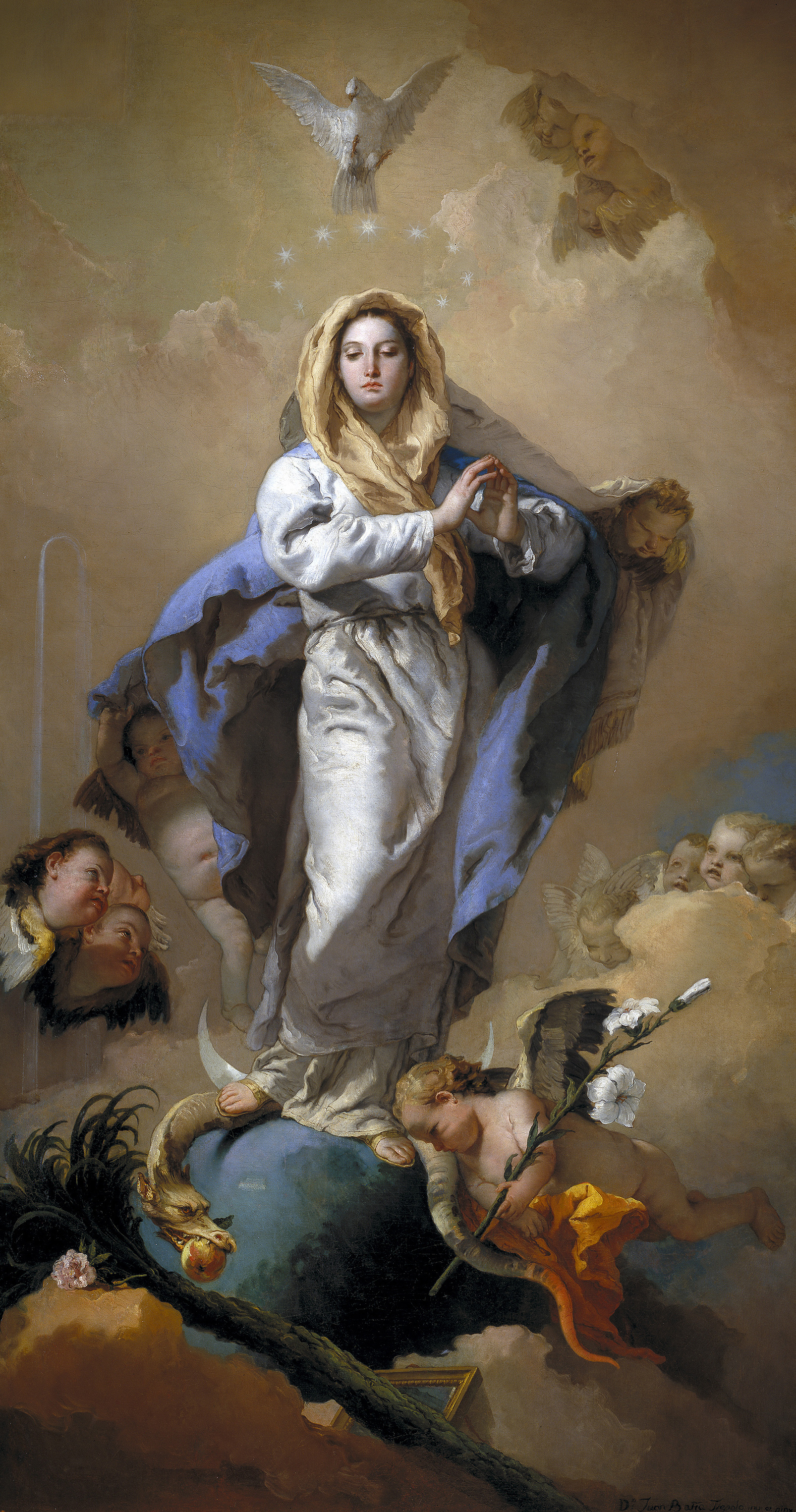
Our Lady of the Conception, main patron of Portugal since 1646, when king John IV crowned her Queen of Portugal. Since then, kings have stopped wearing crowns in Portugal. The main center of veneration is the Sanctuary of Our Lady of the Conception in Vila Viçosa.

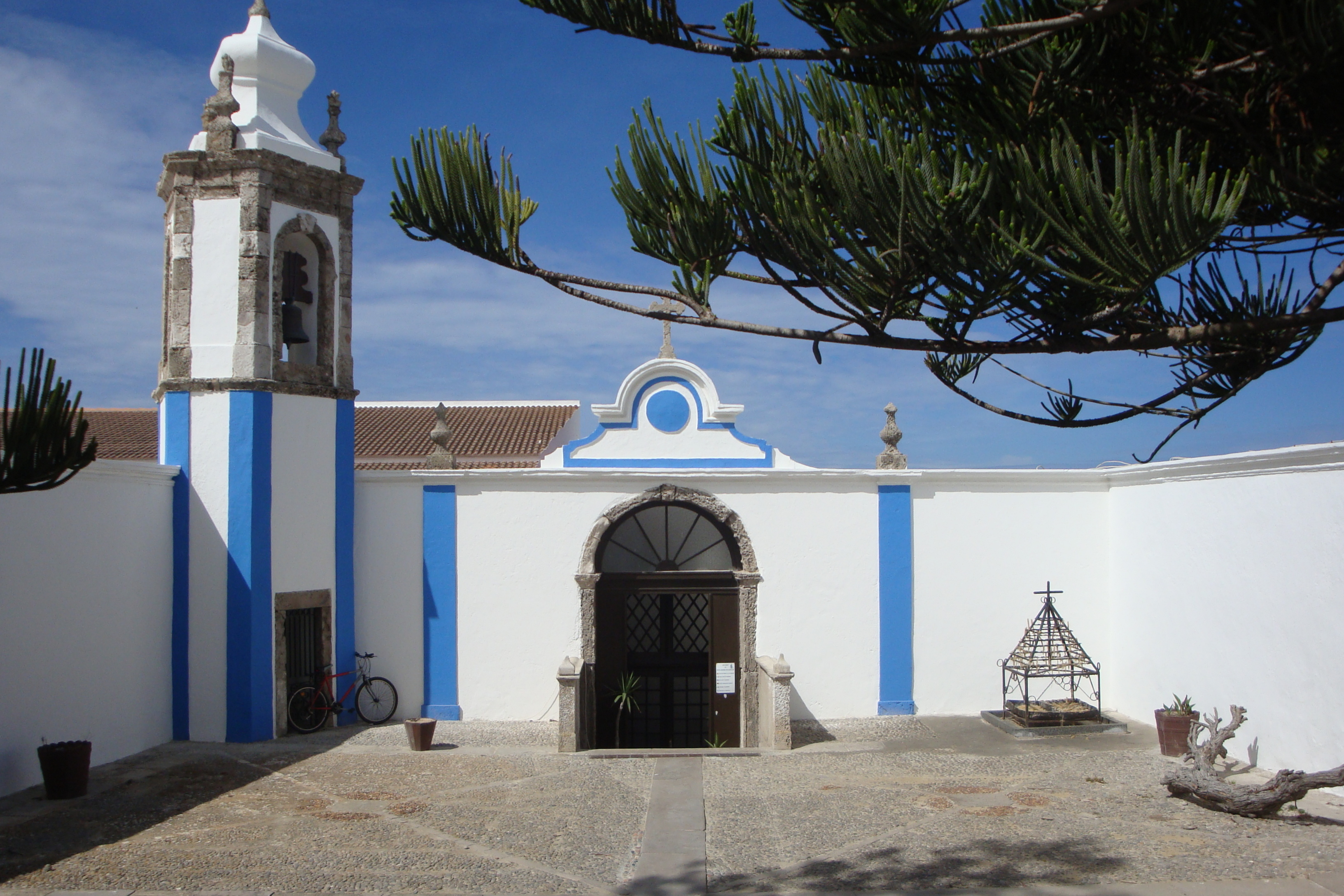
Sanctuary of Our Lady of Remedies, Peniche. The westernmost sanctuary in Europe

Note: (Note: source: Lista de santuários marianos § Portugal on Portuguese Wikipedia)

Name	Location	Region (Note: accordingly with NUTS 2)	Diocese
Sanctuary of Our Lady of Fátima	Fátima	Central	Diocese of Leiria–Fátima
Sanctuary of Our Lady of Sameiro	Braga	North	Archdiocese of Braga
Sanctuary of Our Lady of Lapa	Sernancelhe	North	Diocese of Lamego
Sanctuary of Our Lady of Good Health	Póvoa de Varzim	North	Archdiocese of Braga
Sanctuary of Our Lady of Piety (Sovereign Mother)	Loulé	Algarve	Diocese of Algarve
Sanctuary of Our Lady of the Nettle (Note: in Portuguese Santuário de Nossa Senhora da Ortiga)	Ortiga, Fátima	Central	Diocese of Leiria–Fátima
Sanctuary of Our Lady of Nazaré	Nazaré, Portugal	Central	Patriarchate of Lisbon
Sanctuary of Our Lady of the Remedies^{pt}	Lamego	North	Diocese of Lamego
Sanctuary of Our Lady of the Remedies	Peniche	Central	Patriarchate of Lisbon
Sanctuary of Our Lady of the Abbey	Santa Maria do Bouro	North	Archdiocese of Braga
Sanctuary of Our Lady of Victory (Note: more famously known as Batalha Monastery)	Batalha, Portugal	Central	Diocese of Leiria-Fátima
Sanctuary of Our Lady of Aparecida	Torno	North	Diocese of Porto
Sanctuary of Our Lady of the Warning	Serapicos	North	Diocese of Bragança-Miranda
Sanctuary of Our Lady of Good News (Note: Possibly Our Lady of the Annunciation)	Terena	Alentejo	Archdiocese of Evora
Sanctuary of Our Lady of Good Dispatch	Cervães	North	Archdiocese of Braga
Sanctuary of Our Lady of Brotas	Brotas	Alentejo	Archdiocese of Evora
Shrine of Our Lady of Cape Espichel	Cape Espichel, Sesimbra	Lisbon Metropolitan Area	Diocese of Setubal
Sanctuary of Our Lady of Mount Carmel in Penha Mount	Guimarães	North	Archdiocese of Braga
Sanctuary of Our Lady of the Conception	Vila Viçosa	Alentejo	Archdiocese of Evora
Sanctuary of Our Lady of the Miracles	Dois Portos, Torres Vedras	Central	Patriarchate of Lisbon
Sanctuary of Our Lady of the Holy Mount	Água de Pau	Açores	Diocese of Angra
Shrine of Our Lady of Peneda	Gavieira	North	Diocese of Viana do Castelo
Sanctuary of Our Lady of Piety	Sanfins do Douro	North	Diocese of Vila Real
Sanctuary of Our Lady of Piety of Tabuas	Vila Nova de Miranda do Corvo	Central	Diocese of Coimbra
Shrine of Our Lady of the Pillar	Póvoa de Lanhoso	North	Archdiocese of Braga
Shrine of Our Lady of Porto de Ave	Porto de Ave	North	Archdiocese of Braga
Shrine of Our Lady of Póvoa	Vale da Senhora da Póvoa (Note: in English Lady of Póvoa Valley)	Central	Diocese of Guarda
Sanctuary of Saint Mary of Alcobaça (Note: Also known as Monastery of Alcobaça)	Alcobaça	Central	Patriarchate of Lisbon
Shrine of Our Lady of Help	Albergaria-a-Velha	Central	Diocese of Aveiro
Sanctuary of Our Lady of the Gorse	Abrantes	Central	Diocese of Portalegre-Castelo Branco
Shrine of Our Lady of Peace	Barral	North	Diocese of Viana do Castelo
Shrine of Our Lady of Grace	Flour Mountain, (Note: Monte Farinha) Mondim de Basto	North	Diocese of Vila Real
Shrine of Our Lady of the Conception of the Rock	Linda-a-Pastora	Lisbon metropolitan area	Patriarchate of Lisbon

== Puerto Rico ==
- Basilica of Our Lady of Montserrat in Hormigueros
- National Sanctuary of Our Lady of Providence in San Juan
- National Shrine of Our Lady of Divine Providence in San Juan
- Sanctuary of Our Lady of Mount Carmel in San Lorenzo
- Sanctuary of Our Lady of the Rosary of the Well in Sabana Grande

== Romania ==
- Shrine of Mary Comforter of the Afflicted, Șumuleu Ciuc

== Russia ==
- Fyodorovskaya Church, Yaroslavl
- Pokrovsky chapel in Church of St. Nicholas in Tolmachi, Moscow

== Rwanda ==
- Shrine of Our Lady of Sorrows, Kibeho

== Slovakia ==
- Marianka, Malacky District
- Basilika Minor-Visitation of Virgin Mary-Levoca
- Basilika of Birthday Virgin Mary-Zilina
- Basilika of Birthday Virgin Mary-Vranov n Toplou
- Our Lady of Snow-Banska Stiavnica
- Our Lady of Sorrow-Petrzalka
- Our Lady of Rosary-Ruzomberok-Cernova
- Assumption of Virgin Mary-Bratislava-Blumental
- Assumption of Virgin Mary-Bratislava-Notre Dame
- Assumption of Virgin Mary-Banska Stiavnica
- Assumption of Virgin Mary-Topolcany
- Assumption of Virgin Mary-Pezinok
- Visitation of Virgin Mary-Nitra

== Serbia ==
- Krušedol Monastery, Srem District
- Studenica Monastery, Moravica District

== South Africa ==
- Ngome Marian Shrine, KwaZulu-Natal
- Mother of Mercy Shrine, Gauteng

== Slovenia ==
- The National Shrine Mary Help of Christians at Brezje
- The mantled Virgin Mary - the protector from Ptujska Gora
- Church of Our Lady of Mercy on Zaplaz
- Basilica of St. Mary, Mother of God at Sveta Gora
- Basilica of the Visitation of the Virgin Mary in Petrovče

== South Korea ==
- Gamgok Our Lady of the Rosary Church, Gamgok-myeon, Eumseong-gun im North Chungcheong Province

== Spain ==
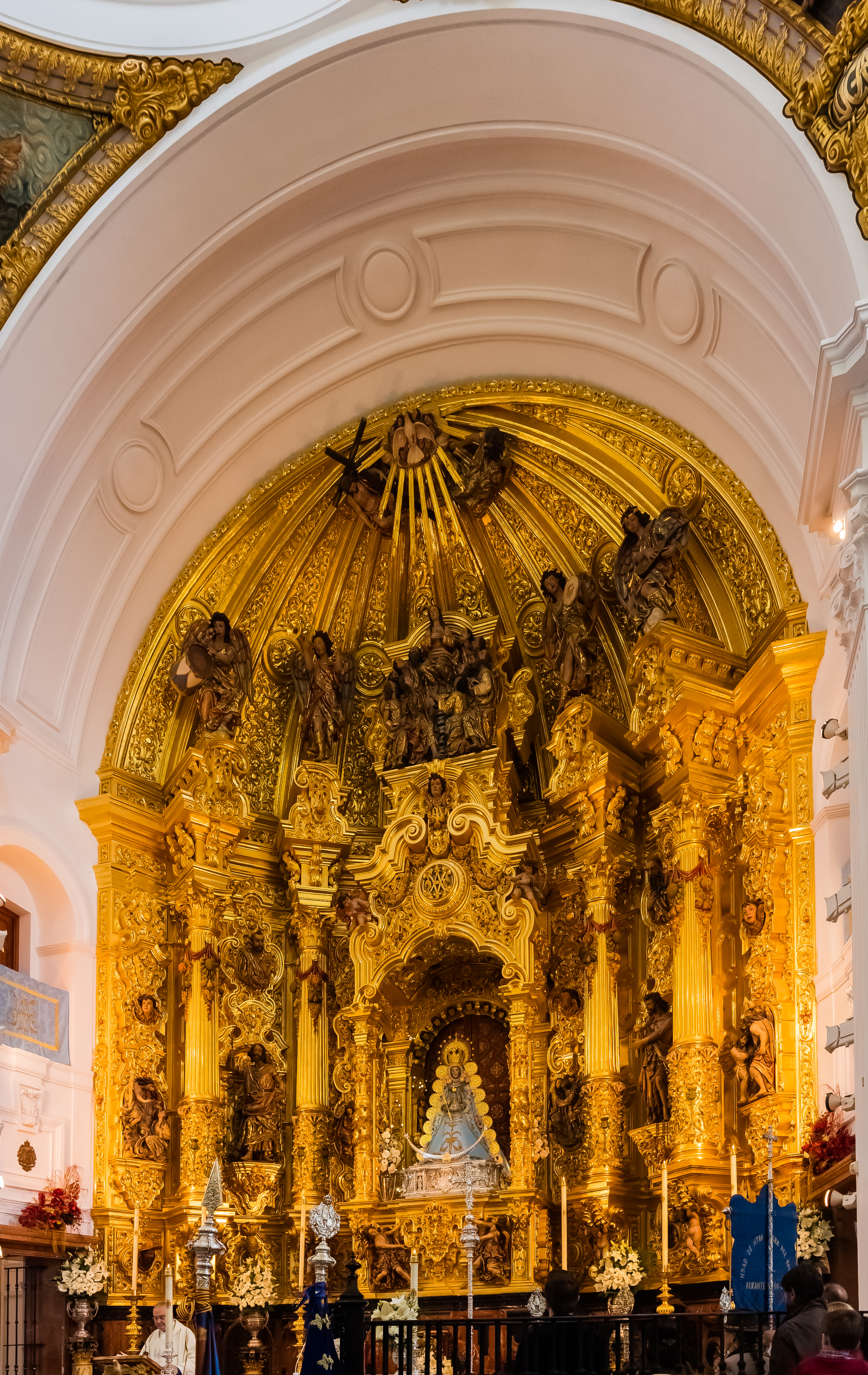
Altar of the Virgin of El Rocío, Huelva, Spain

- The Sanctuary of the Apparitions, in Pontevedra, Galicia
- The Sanctuary of Chandavila, in La Codosera, Extremadura
- The Sanctuary of Black Virgin of Montserrat, in Montserrat, Catalonia
- The Sanctuary of Our Lady of Covadonga, in Picos de Europa, Asturias
- The Sanctuary of Saint Mary of Guadalupe, in Province of Cáceres, Extremadura
- The Basilica of Our Lady of the Pillar, in Zaragoza, Aragón
- The Shrine of Our Lady of the Angels of Torreciudad, in Aragón, entrusted to the personal prelature of Opus Dei
- The Shrine of Our Lady of Rocío, in Andalucia
- The Basilica and Sanctuary of Our Lady of Candelaria, Tenerife, Canary Islands
- The Shrine of Our Lady of Mount Carmel of Garabandal, in Cantabrian Mountains
- The Benedictine Sanctuary of Valvanera, in La Rioja
- The Franciscan Sanctuary of Our Lady of Arantzazu, in Gipuzkoa
- The Basilica of Begoña in Bilbao
- The Shrine of Our Lady of Sorrows of Umbe, in Laukiz, near Bilbao, Biscay
- The Sanctuary of the Virgin of the Light, in Tarifa, Andalucia
- The Sanctuary of Our Lady of the Saints, in Alcalá de los Gazules, Andalucia
- The Shrine of Our Lady of Africa, Ceuta
- The Cathedral-Basilica of Our Crowned Mother of Palmar in El Palmar de Troya

== Sri Lanka ==
- Basilica of Our Lady of Lanka, in Tewatte, Ragama
- Shrine of Our Lady of Madhu in Mannar district
- Shrine of Our Lady of Matara in Matara

== Switzerland ==
- Shrine of Our Lady of Einsiedeln, Einsiedeln
- Madonna del Sasso, Orselina

== Syria ==
- Church of the Dormition of Our Lady
- Convent of Our Lady of Saidnaya, Saidnaya
- Lady of the Valley, Al-Nasirah

== Turkey ==
- House of the Virgin Mary in Ephesus, Turkey, believed to be the place where Mary was taken to by St. John and lived until the Assumption.
- Church of Mary in Ephesus, Turkey, in which the Council of Ephesus (the Third Ecumenical Council) was held in 431.
- Life-giving Spring in Istanbul, a famous spring associated with the healing powers of the Theotokos, the feast of which is celebrated on the Friday after Easter.
- Sumela monastery, an important site of pilgrimage for Pontic Greeks situated in the Trabzon region.

== Ukraine ==
- Dzhublyk, Zakarpattia Oblast
- Pochayiv Lavra in Ukraine
- The Basilica of the Most Holy Theotokos of Zarvanytsia, Ukraine

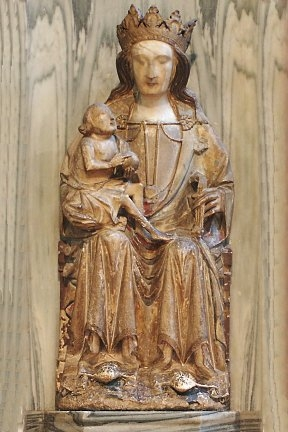
Our Lady of Westminster

== United Kingdom ==
- Carfin Grotto: Carfin Grotto, Scotland's National Shrine to Our Lady of Lourdes - Carfin, North Lanarkshire, Scotland
- Ladyewell Shrine: St Mary's at Fernyhalgh and Ladyewell - The Shrine of Our Lady and the Martyrs, Fulwood, Lancashire, England
- Our Lady of Ipswich in Ipswich, England - ecumenical shrine in an Anglican church
- Our Lady of the Annunciation Church, King's Lynn - Pontifical shrine of Our Lady of Walsingham.
- Our Lady of Walsingham in Walsingham, England - Anglican and Roman Catholic National shrines
- Our Lady of Willesden in Willesden, London NW10 - Anglican and Roman Catholic shrines
- Shrine Church of Our Lady of Consolation and St Francis, West Grinstead, West Sussex
- Shrine of Our Lady of Egmanton in Egmanton, Nottinghamshire, England
- Our Lady of the Taper in Cardigan, Wales
- Shrine of Our Lady of Caversham, near Reading in Berkshire
- Shrine of Our Lady, Bradstowe
- Shrine of Our Lady in Penrhys, Wales
- Our Lady of the Assumption Shrine at the Friary, Aylesford, Kent
- Shrine of the Miraculous Relic Image of Our Lady of Guadalupe, The Holy Child & St. Joseph Catholic Church, Bedford, England
- Our Lady of Doncaster in Doncaster, England
- Our Lady of Perpetual Succour Church, Great Billing, Northamptonshire, England
- Our Lady of Westminster in Westminster Cathedral, London
- Church and Shrine of Our Lady of the Assumption and St Gregory (also known as "Church of the Assumption" and "Warwick Street Church"), Warwick Street, London W1B 5LZ
- Shrine of Our Lady of Pen Llyn - Anglican Shrine located in St Peter's Church, Pwllheli
- Chapel of Our Lady of the Crag: a surviving pre-Reformation Roman Catholic shrine in Knaresborough, northern Yorkshire.

== United States ==
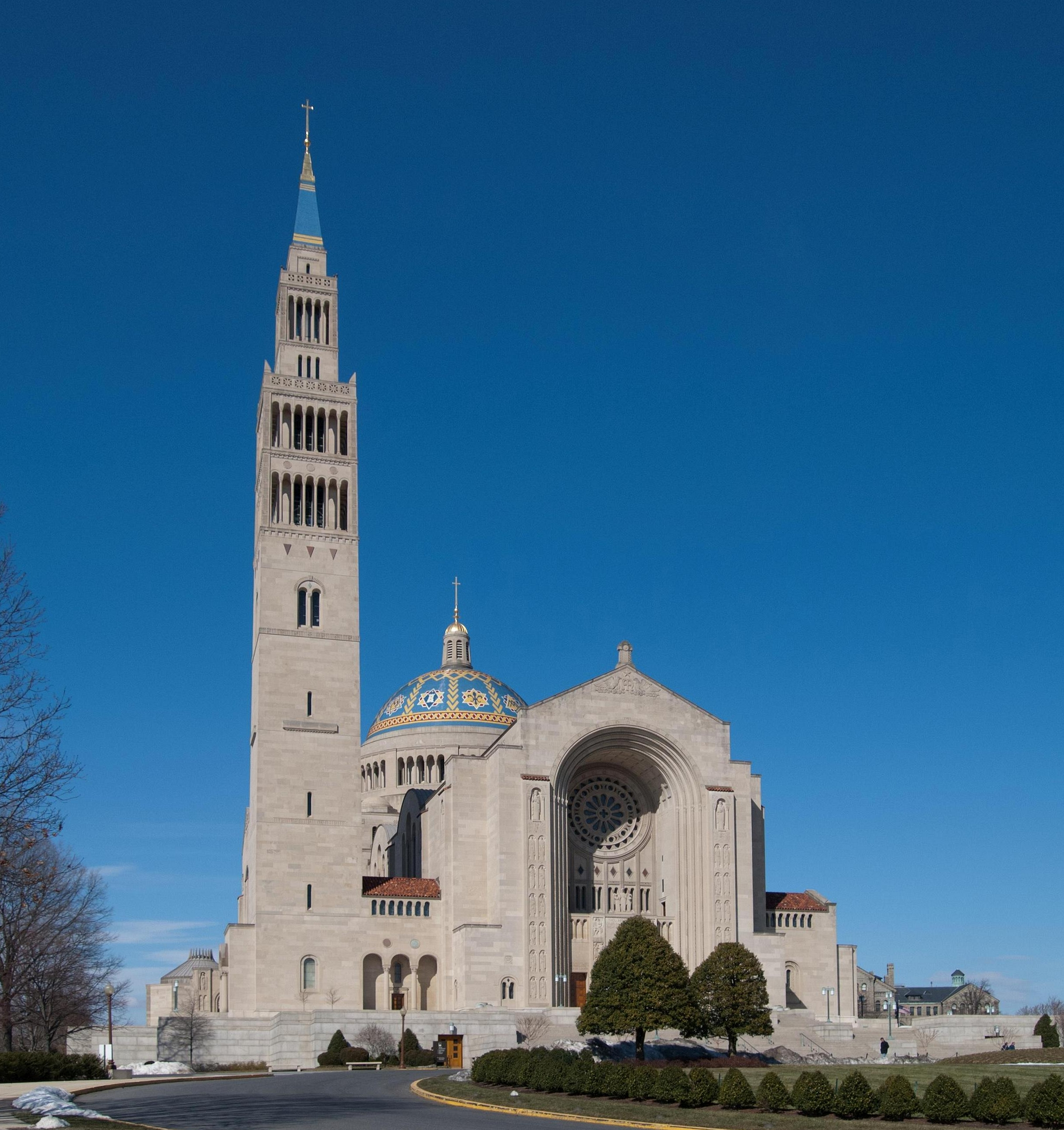
Basilica of the National Shrine of the Immaculate Conception, Washington

- Archdiocesan Marian Shrine, Milwaukee, Wisconsin
- Assumption Chapel ("The Grasshopper Chapel"), Cold Spring, Minnesota
- Assumption of the Blessed Virgin Mary, Basilica of the National Shrine of the; in Baltimore, Maryland
- Basilica Shrine of Our Lady of the Miraculous Medal; in Philadelphia, Pennsylvania
- Black Madonna Shrine and Grottos, in Jefferson County, Missouri
- Blessed Virgin Mary, Shrine of the; in Holy Name of Jesus Church, San Francisco, California
- Cathedral of Our Lady of the Angels, Los Angeles, California
- Holy Hill National Shrine of Mary, Help of Christians, Basilica of; in Erin, Wisconsin
- Immaculate Conception, Basilica of the National Shrine of the; in Washington, D.C.
- Shrine of the Immaculate Conception, Atlanta, Georgia
- Immaculate Heart of Mary, National Blue Army Shrine of the; in Washington, New Jersey (see Blue Army of Our Lady of Fátima#Blue Army Shrine)
- Shrine of the Immaculate Heart of Mary on the grounds of the Congregation of the Mother of the Redeemer in Carthage, Missouri, site of the annual Marian Days celebration
- National Shrine of Mary, Mother of the Church National Shrine of Mary, Mother of the Church; on the grounds of St. Patrick Church, Laurie, Missouri (in the Diocese of Jefferson City)
- Mary, Queen of the Universe Shrine, National Shrine of; in Orlando, Florida
- Necedah Shrine, an interdicted Marian shrine in Necedah, Wisconsin.
- Our Lady of Champion, National Shrine of in Champion, Wisconsin
- Our Lady of Consolation, Basilica and National Shrine of, in Carey, Ohio
- Our Lady of Czestochowa, National Shrine of; in Doylestown, Pennsylvania
- Our Lady of Fátima shrine in Franklin Furnace, Ohio
- Nuestra Senora La Conquistadora, Santa Fe, New Mexico: chapel inside the Cathedral Basilica of St. Francis of Assisi; the oldest Madonna in the United States
- Our Lady of Good Help, Shrine of; Brown County, Wisconsin
- Our Lady of Guadalupe, Shrine of; Des Plaines, Illinois
- Our Lady of Guadalupe, Shrine of; in LaCrosse, Wisconsin
- Our Lady of the Island, Shrine of; in Manorville, New York
- National Shrine of Our Lady of La Leche, at Mission Nombre de Dios in St. Augustine, Florida
- Our Lady of La Salette, National Shrine of; in Attleboro, Massachusetts
- Our Lady of Lebanon, National Shrine of; North Jackson, Ohio
- Our Lady of Loreto, in Goliad, Texas
- Our Lady of Lourdes, in Emmitsburg, Maryland
- Our Lady of Lourdes Belmont Abbey, Charlotte, North Carolina.
- Our Lady of Lourdes, National Shrine of; in Euclid, Ohio
- Our Lady of Lourdes Grotto located on the grounds of St. Francis Seminary, in St. Francis, Wisconsin
- Our Lady of Lourdes Grotto located on the campus of the University of Notre Dame, in Notre Dame, Indiana
- Our Lady of Lourdes Grotto maintained by the Missionary Association of Mary Immaculate in San Antonio, Texas
- Our Lady of Martyrs, Shrine of, Auriesville, New York (also known as the National Shrine of the North American Martyrs)
- Our Lady of the Miraculous Medal, National Shrine of; in Perryville, Missouri
- Our Lady of Mount Carmel, National Shrine of; in Middletown, New York
- Our Lady of Peace Shrine, in Santa Clara, California
- Our Lady of Pompeii in New York City
- Our Lady of Prompt Succor, in New Orleans, Louisiana
- Our Lady of the Rockies, in Butte, Montana
- Our Lady of the Roses, Mary Help of Mothers at Bayside, New York
- Our Lady of the Snows, National Shrine of, in Belleville, Illinois
- Our Lady of Sorrows, Shrine of; in Rhineland, Missouri
- Our Lady of Walsingham, National Shrine of; in Williamsburg, Virginia
- Our Lady of Walsingham for the Episcopal Church, National Shrine to; Grace Church, Sheboygan, Wisconsin
- Our Sorrowful Mother, National Sanctuary of; in Portland, Oregon
- Queen of the Holy Rosary Memorial Shrine (in memory of military veterans) in LaSalle, Illinois
- Saint Mary, Cathedral of, in Miami, Florida
- Schoenstatt Marian Shrine, in Madison, Wisconsin
- For a complete list and further reading, see footnotes

== Uruguay ==
- Cathedral Basilica of Our Lady of the Thirty-Three, Florida

== Vatican City ==
- Grotta di Lourdes

== Venezuela ==
- The Shrine of Our Lady of Betania, in the State of Miranda, Venezuela
- Our Lady of Coromoto, Guanare, Venezuela
- Our Lady of the Rosary of Chiquinquirá, Zulia, Venezuela

== Vietnam ==
- Our Lady of La Vang in Quảng Trị, Vietnam
- Notre-Dame de Tà Pao in Binh Thuan, Vietnam

== See also ==
- List of shrines
- Lourdes grotto – worldwide tributes to the French original
- Marian apparition
- Catholic Marian church buildings
