= Pilgrim Centres in Wayanad =

Pilgrim centres in the Wyanad district of the Indian state of Kerala arrived in the 19th century.

== Centres ==
- Saint Mary Orthodox Cathedral is a declared "Pilgrim Centre of Saint Mary" and is the oldest church in Sultan Bathery, Wayanad. The church is part of the Malankara Orthodox Syrian Church and has the sacred relics of three saints as well as administrative control over the 48 parishes of the MOSC Church in Wayanad.
- Mor Baselious Jacobite Syrian Church, Cheeyambam, Pulpally on foot pilgrimage from churches in Malabar on the festival of St.Yeldho Mar Baselios. It is an all religion pilgrim center.
- Thirunelly Temple and Papanashini, Thirunelly, it is believed that the temple is more than 1,000 years old.
- Valliyoorkkavu Bhagavathi Temple is an important worship place.
- Lourde Matha Shrine, Pallikunnu Church was built by French priest Fr. Jefreno in 1908.
- St. George Forane Church Kallody, Wayanad is a Syro-Malabar Catholic Church.
- Varambetta Mosque Mananthavady is a Mosque about 300 years old.
- Malankarakunnu St. Thomas Church, It is the oldest Malankara Orthodox Syrian Church in Malabar region, part of Sultan Bathery Diocese.
- Seetha Devi Temple (also known as the Sree Seetha Devi Lava Kusa Temple) is one of the only Hindu temples to have installed deities of Lava and Kusha, children of Sree Rama and Seetha Devi.
- Anantnath Swami Temple is a Jain temple, dedicated to Lord Anantanatha, the 14th Tirthankara.
- Assumption Forane Church, Sulthan Bathery was built by French Missionaries in 1900.
