= Dzhublyk =

Ukrainian Greek Catholic Marian sanctuary near Nyzhnye Bolotnye and Vilkhivka, Ukraine

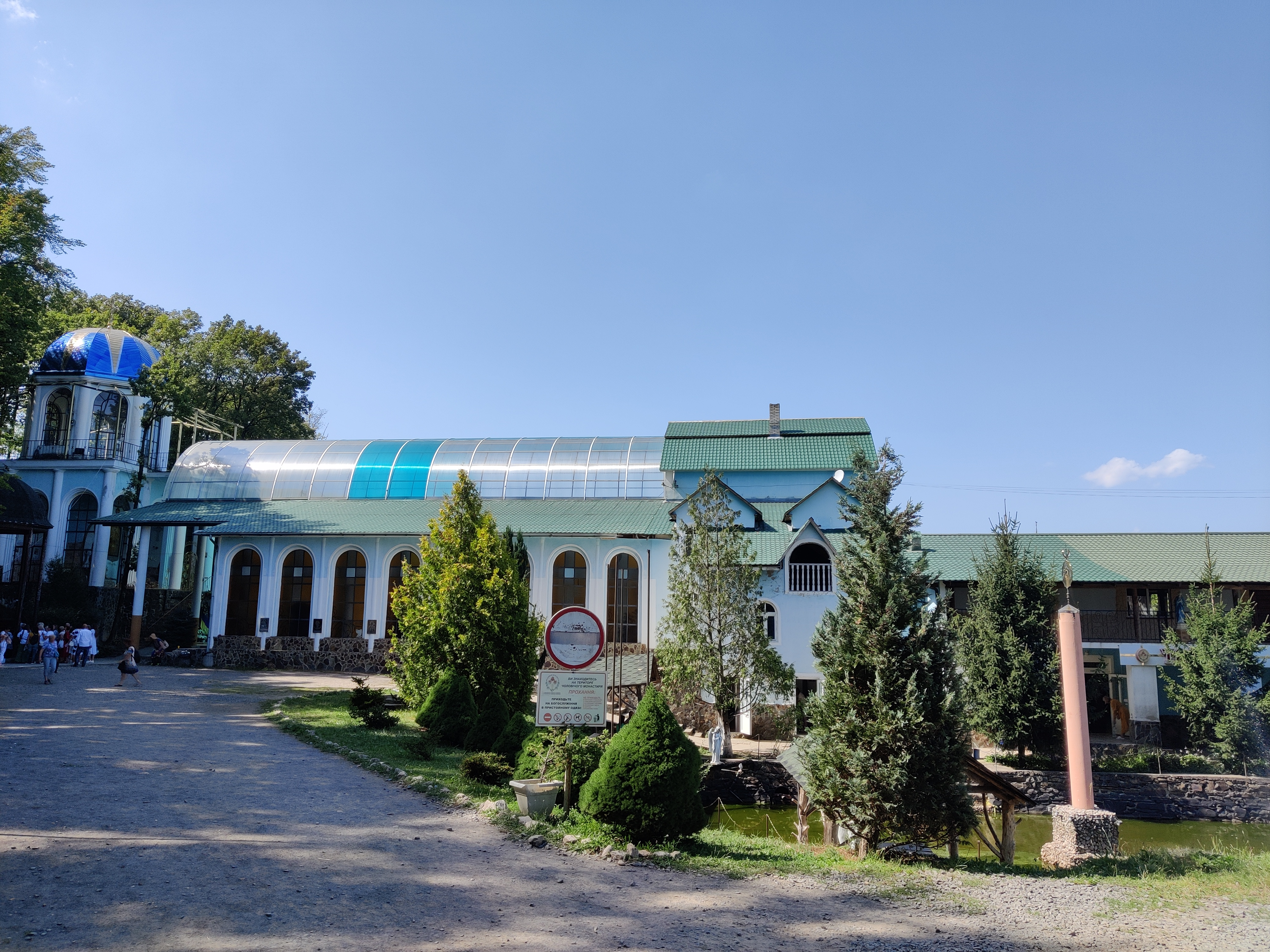
View of the monastery in Dzhublyk

Dzhublyk, also transliterated as Jublyk (Ukrainian: Джублик [ˈdʒublɪk]), is a Greek-Catholic Marian sanctuary near the villages Nyzhnye Bolotnye and Vilkhivka in western Ukraine. The sanctuary is known for the Marian apparition of Our Lady and Holy Family. Dzhublyk is situated in the Irshava raion of Zakarpattya region, also known as Transcarpathia. In the years following the revelation of August 2002, an ever increasing number of pilgrims arrive to Dzhublyk.

== Background ==
The Ukrainian Greek Catholic Church was heavily persecuted by the Soviet authorities from 1946 to 1989. In 1988 Ukraine celebrated a "Millennium of Christianity" marking one thousand years since the "baptism of Kievan Rus" in 988. In June 2001, Pope John Paul II visited Ukraine and at a Byzantine-rite liturgy in L'viv, canonized twenty-seven Greek Catholic martyrs of the twentieth century. From 1989 to 2006, the Ukrainian Greek Catholic Church went through a period of re-building and re-organization, starting with the legalization of the UGCC.

Nyzhnye Bolotnye is an exceptional place in Transcarpathia, as the local Greek Catholic Church building was never fully closed or turned into a sports hall, but remained a place of prayer throughout communism. Nyzhnye Bolotnye became one of the main areas of operation of the most prominent underground priests of Transcarpathia, Petro Oros, Petro Pavlo Madjar and Ivan Margitych.

== Apparition ==
It is said that on August 27, 2002 near the water-spring at Dzhublyk the Mother of God appeared to two girls, ten-year-old Olena Kuruts from Vilkhivka and her friend, nine-year-old Mariana Kobol. The girls were fetching water from a spring when they saw a beautiful young woman, dressed in white clothes with a blue belt, standing on a low-hanging cloud. She smiled but did not speak. The frightened children returned home and told their parents.

Mariana's father, Petro, is a Greek Catholic priest. Father Petro instructed the girls to ask the woman her name should they see her again. Later that day they saw the woman again on their way home from picking up Olena'a sister from kindergarten; this time accompanied by two angels. The woman identified herself as the Virgin Mary and said that she had come to help.

Father Petro joined the girls on the third day. According to social anthropologist Agnieszka Halemba, Father Petro is active in promoting "a type of religiosity based on a combination of strict discipline and high emotional involvement." During the following apparition, on Saturday, August 31, the Mother of God asked the girls to inform the church authorities that it was in fact her, the Mother of God, who came and asks here, on the place of revelation to pray. To the question of Father Petro, "Which bishops to inform about this", Mary answered - "The elderly vladyka Margitych", who was auxiliary bishop of Mukachevo at that time.

Later the children reported that the visions included Jesus and St. Joseph. The apparition of the Mother of God became that of the Holy Family. Mariana stopped seeing visions. After one particularly stressful vision, Olenka was left temporarily speechless, and conveyed to her parents, using pen and paper, that she would not be able to attend school during Lent which had just begun. The local bishop supported and promoted the visions. Bishop Margitych died one year later September 7, 2003, 83 years old during the archi-hierarchic church service, for which he came to bless the new throne.

== Veneration ==
One of the visions requested the construction of a monastery of the Holy Family in Dzhublyk. Construction was begun in the summer of 2003 but halted soon after due to a conflict between locals and the clergy. The monastery "Appearance of the Holy Family" was later completed, built as convent. At present there is a Chapel of Saint John the Baptist, with a large roofed assembly square in front of it. A copy of the Icon of God's Mother of Jerusalem is kept in the chapel. Stations of the Cross lead to the top of the hill behind the chapel. According to Father Atanazji Cijpes, manager of the site, all the buildings are planned and designed by the Virgin.

The site has developed into an important pilgrimage destination. On the 27th of each month busloads of pilgrims arrive, mainly from Ukrainian Galicia and neighboring Slovakia. Each year on August 27, an anniversary of the apparitions is celebrated with fireworks.

== Analysis ==
According to Vlad Naumescu, the apparitions at Dzhublyk represent a call for unity. Mary is reported to have said, "I want to raise the authority of priests in the people, unite this divided nation and unite the Church." Halemba sees the site as an example of Ukrainian national identity building, even to the point of the Virgin expressing a preference for the liturgy in Ukrainian rather than Old Slavic. She further sees this as reflective of a tension between one group, led by Archbishop Semedii, who saw Transcarpathia as a multi-ethnic area in need of a separate administration; and a Ukrainian-unity group led by Bishop Margitych, who saw no need for that. The Vatican supported a sui iuris status, and the Mukachevo eparchy is directly answerable to Rome. The Virgin Mary, however, would appear to support the view of the late bishop Margitych.

== Chronicle of Dzhublyk apparitions ==
- The Virgin Mary also asked for a hospital to be built.
- Visible signs on the sun - for those who do not believe in this. The sun performs a "dance", rotates around its axis, changing its colours. Besides that, on the place of revelation, often appears a rainbow - visible sign of union between God and people.
- "Message, that is passed by girls from Nyzhnye Bolotnye - "is in spirit of God's Mother", - so it is regarded at Apostolic Nunciature in Ukraine (according to the words of Bishop Marhitych).

== See also ==
- Ukrainian Greek Catholic Church
