= Queen of the Holy Rosary Memorial Shrine =

Coordinates: 41°19′54″N 89°5′52″W

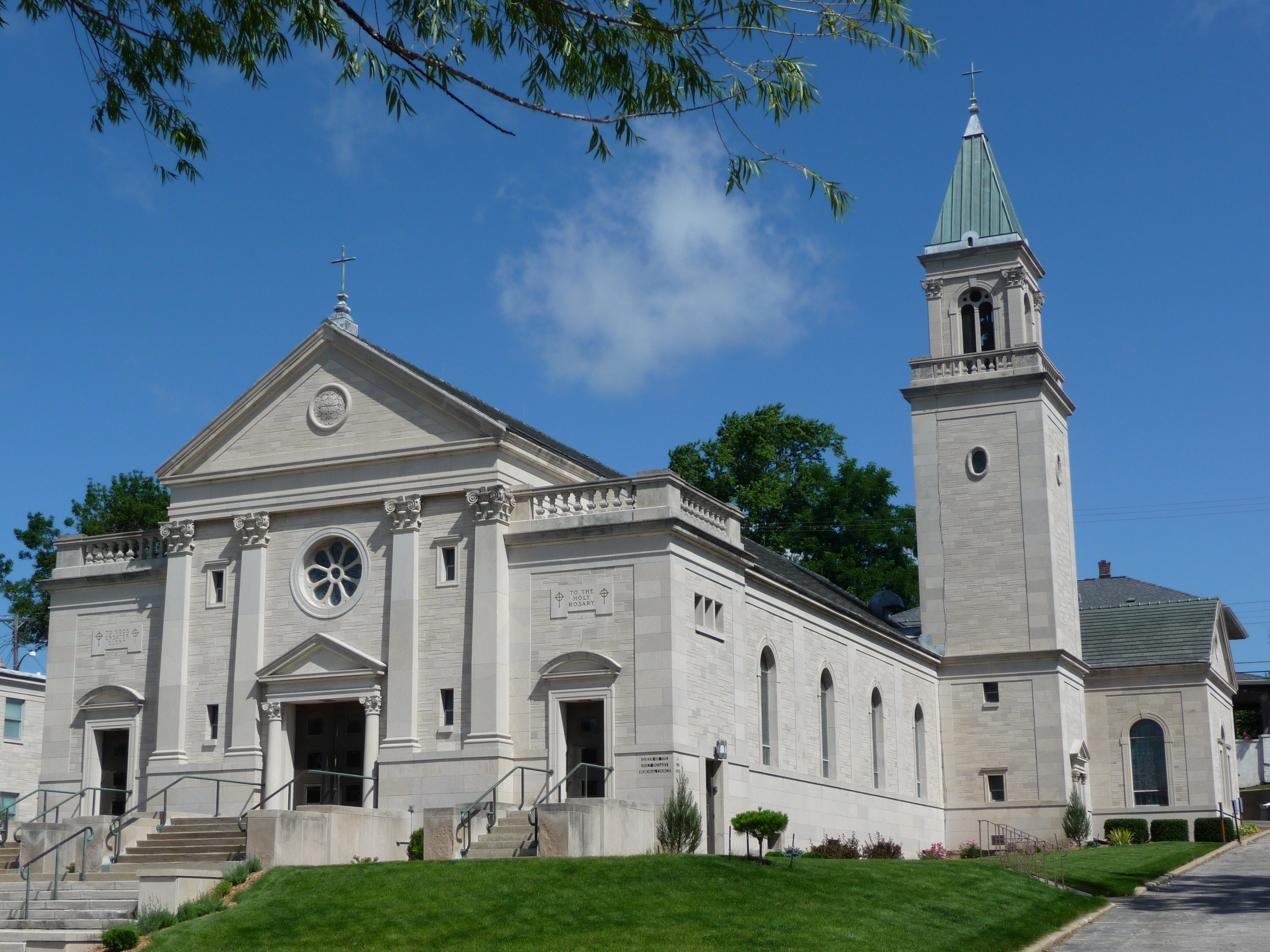
Queen of the Holy Rosary Memorial Shrine - Exterior

The Queen of the Holy Rosary Memorial Shrine is a Catholic church in the Diocese of Peoria It is located at 529 Fourth Street in La Salle, Illinois and is dedicated to the Blessed Virgin Mary in memory of all living and deceased military veterans who have served in the United States Armed Forces. It was deemed worthy to be elevated to a Diocesan Shrine on November 7, 2007, by Bishop Daniel R. Jenky, and dissolved as a parish. He has granted a partial indulgence to those making a pious pilgrimage to the Shrine. The Shrine complex consists of the church, the rectory and a school building.

Bishop Jenky designated the Shrine as a Holy Door pilgrimage site for the Holy Year of Mercy from November 8, 2015, through November 20, 2016, as announced by Pope Francis.

== History ==
In 1904, Father Charles Zachini from the Diocese of Loreto, Italy arrived in La Salle and ministered to the Italian-American community for the Illinois towns of La Salle, Peru, and Oglesby. The first Masses were said in a private house on the corner of Third and Creve Coeur streets. Two months later, a house was purchased on the corner of Fourth and Bucklin, converted into a small church and dedicated as the Church of the Immaculate Conception on December 8, 1905. Two years after the dedication, Zachini was recalled to Italy to be made a canon of the Basilica of Loreto and the church was closed.

For 18 years the Italian-American community was without its own parish until Father Peter Delo arrived in 1925 and established the Queen of the Holy Rosary church with the permission of Bishop Edmund M. Dunne. The first Masses were said in the Knights of Columbus hall. On the first Sunday in October, 1925, the Queen of the Holy Rosary Church was dedicated in a converted house at 529 Fourth Street and had a membership of 35 families. This is next to the site of the current structure.

In 1936, Father Simon D. Bernardi was appointed pastor of the parish. He was originally from Pievepelago in the province of Modena, Italy and ordained June 12, 1932 in the United States. Parish collections averaged US$30 per week. From 1936 to 1944, the debt of the parish was paid off, and fund-raising began for a new building for the growing parish. At that time architect A. F. Moratz of Bloomington, Illinois was contracted to design a Neo-Italian Renaissance-style church. To this end, the parish contributed to the building fund from 1944 to 1954. Ground was broken on May 16, 1954, with construction under the direction of Father Bernardi; total cost was approximately $300,000. The new church was dedicated on October 7, 1956, with an Apostolic Blessing granted by Pope Pius XII. Monsignor Francesco Roberti, Secretary of the Sacred Congregation of the Council and personal representative of the Pope to the Tenth U.S. CCD Congress participated in the Mass.

Throughout the years various improvements were made. The rectory was completed in 1958. In the spring of 1958, the old church-rectory was demolished. On July 21, 1959, the parish became free of debt. In November 1965 an Italian-made mosaic was installed on the back walls of the main and side altars. In 1968 a Catechetical Center was completed. This required the purchase of the remaining half block of property west of the church and the demolition of the buildings.

Father Bernardi was elevated to Privy Chamberlain with the title of Very Reverend by Pope Pius XII in 1956, and elevated to Domestic Prelate with the title of Reverend Monsignor in 1963 by Pope John XXIII. On October 5, 1975, after 39 years serving the parish, he died in the sacristy before a Pontifical High Mass to celebrate the 50th anniversary of the parish. Succeeding pastors have been Edward Bawiec (1975 - 1986), Dale Maloy (1986 - 2003), Gordon Pillon (2003 - 2006), Robert Rayson (2006 - 2012), Antonio Dittmer (2012 - 2016), Paul Carlson (2016 - 2021) and Tom Otto (2021–Present).

== Building detail ==
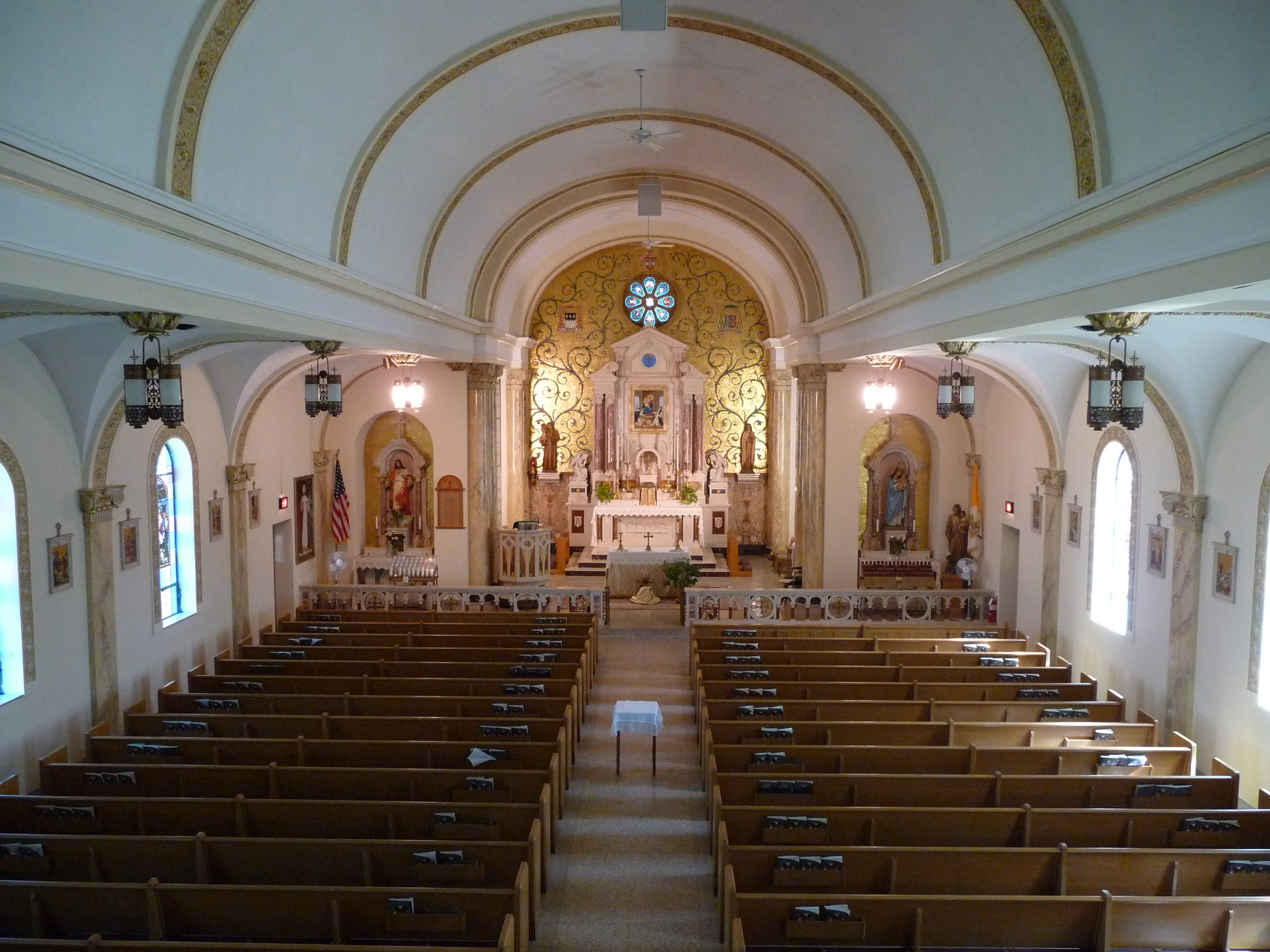
Queen of the Holy Rosary Memorial Shrine - Interior

- The building has a steel structure with an exterior of Bedford stone with random ashlar.
- The capitals are of Corinthian style and the exterior doors are bronze.
- All floors are terrazzo.
- The interior contains 15 different marbles from Italy, France and North Africa.
- The marble altars and railings were carved in Pietrasanta, Italy by the laboratory of Felice Bertozzi and installed personally by the artisans.
- There are numerous venetian mosaics, the most notable being the replica of Our Lady of Pomeii, Patroness of the Parish, above the center of the main altar. The largest surrounds the main altar in gold, and depicts vines reaching upwards with three coats of arms.
- The marble pulpit weighs about three tons yet can be moved by one man.
- The stained glass windows are of imported German and Belgian glass in the Italian Renaissance design and depict:
  - The Nativity
  - St. Anne
  - St. Maria Goretti
  - St. Frances Xavier (Mother) Cabrini
  - St. Pius X
  - The Holy Family
  - The Resurrection
  - Christ the King
  - Guardian Angel
  - Queen of the Holy Rosary
  - The Sacred Heart
  - The Good Shepard
  - St. John the Baptist
- Two rose windows, of Agnus Dei and Our Lady of Sorrows, depict symbols of God and the Virgin Mary.
- The choir loft contains a pipe organ and an electronic carillon with a library of 700 songs that can be played through the bell tower.

== Memorial Dedication ==
It was decided at the time of dedication that the Queen of the holy rosary would memorialize seven parishioners who lost their lives while serving in World War II, John Marinangeli, Richard Marinangeli, Anthony Piraino, Joseph Piraino, John Torchia, Angelo Venturi and Barney Valesano.

== Gallery ==
Interior Shrine Features
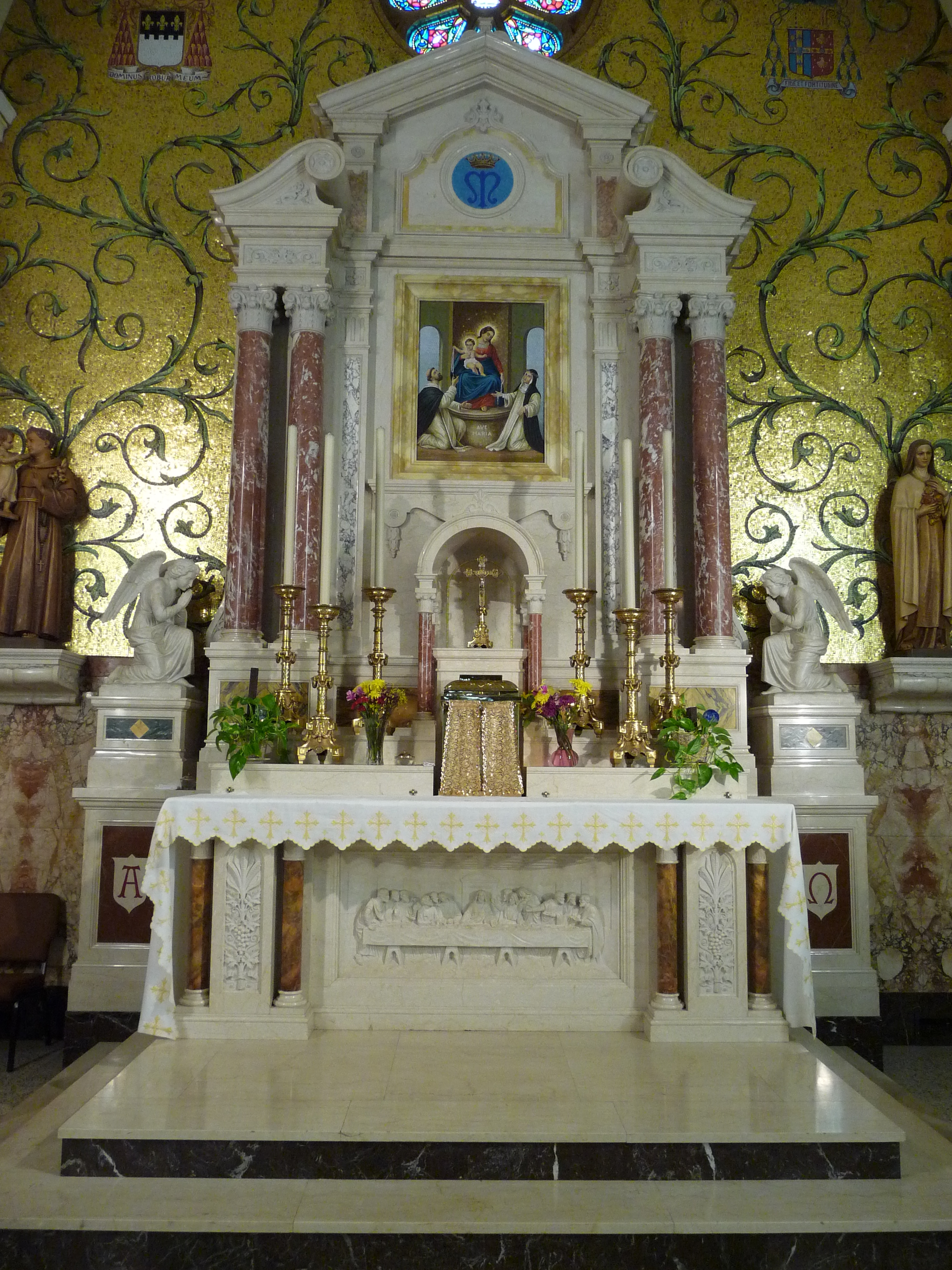
Queen of the Holy Rosary Memorial Shrine - Main altar

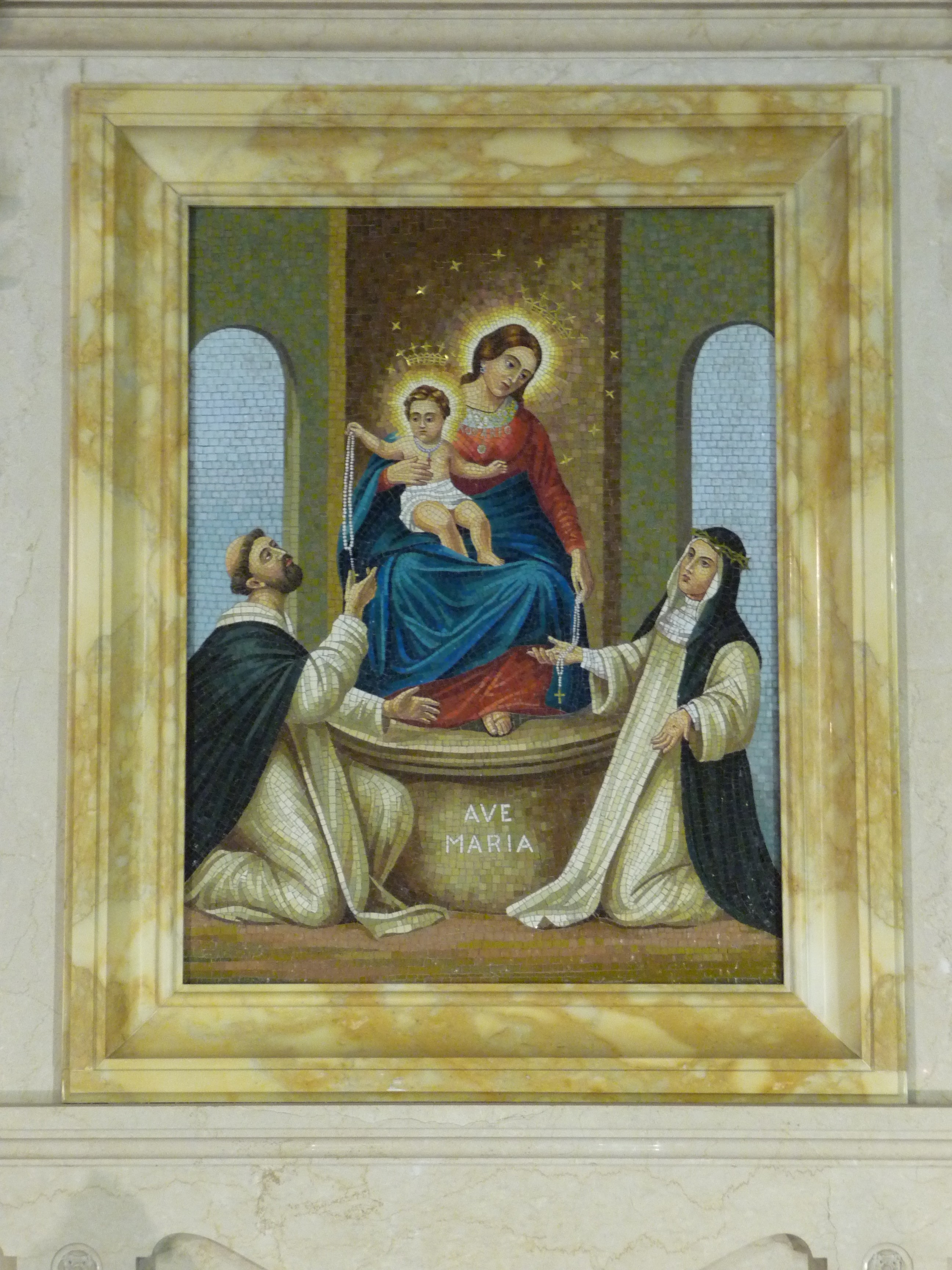
Queen of the Holy Rosary Memorial Shrine - Our Lady of Pompeii mosaic detail

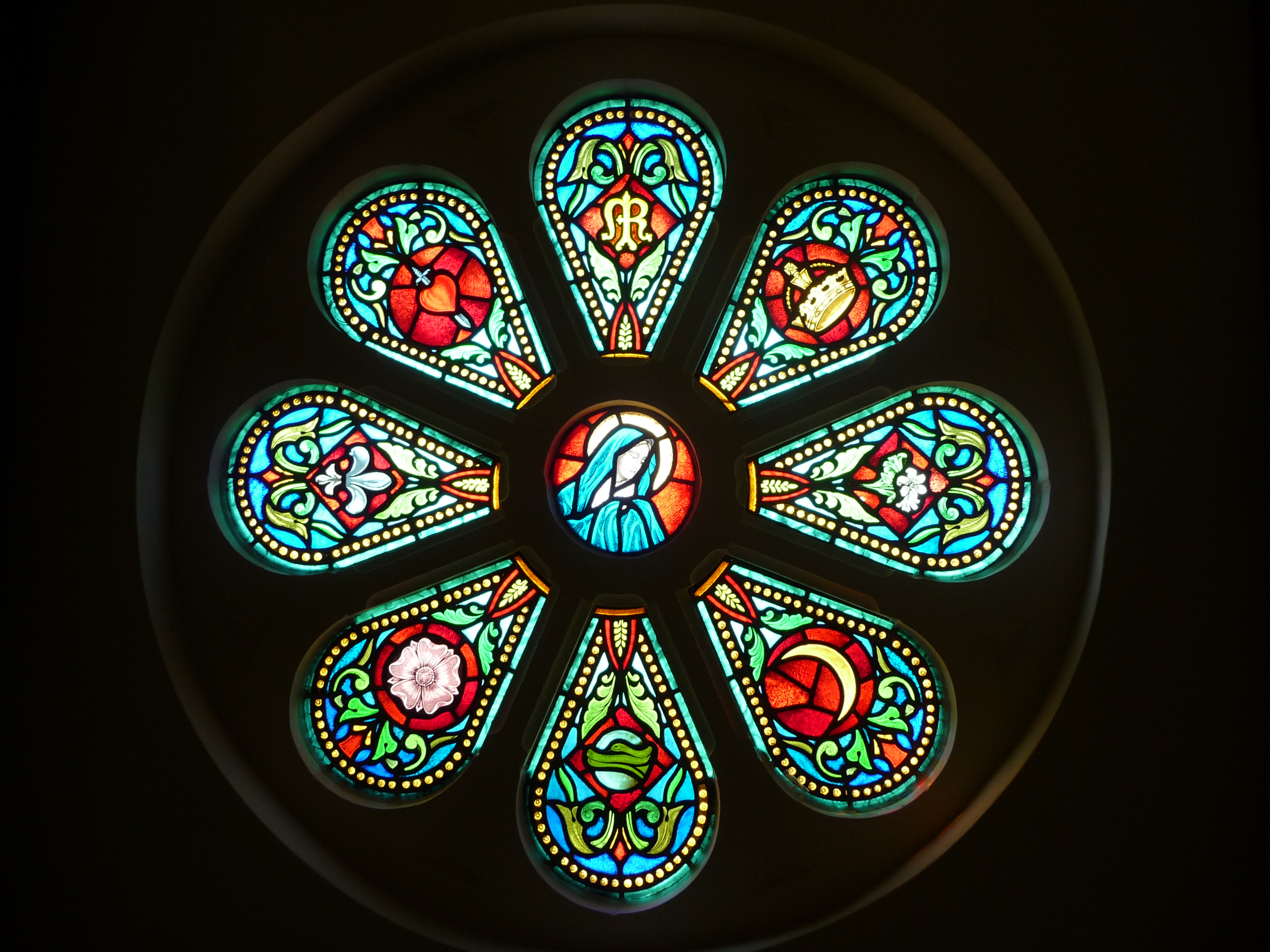
Queen of the Holy Rosary Memorial Shrine - Marian rose window
