= Our Lady of the Wind =

Church in Enfeh, Lebanon

Our Lady of the Wind, Saydet El-Rih in Arabic, was built in the Byzantine era in Enfeh, Lebanon. Even though the roof of the chapel has long collapsed, it still retains traces of wall paintings representing Saint George and Saint Demetrios, the Omnipotent Christ, two evangelists, some saints and the Virgin calming the wind. It is believed that sailors and fishermen from the village of Enfeh built the chapel so that the Virgin Mary would protect them as they sailed the Mediterranean.
