= Seetha Devi Temple =

Sree Seetha Devi Lava Kusha Temple

Seetha Devi Temple, Pulpally

Religion
- Affiliation: Hinduism
- District: Wayanad
- Deity: Sita (Seetha Devi), Lava and Kusha

Location
- Location: Pulpally, Wayanad district, Kerala, India
- State: Kerala
- Country: India
- Interactive map of Seetha Devi Temple, Pulpally

Architecture
- Type: Hindu temple

The Sree Seetha Devi Lava Kusa Temple at Pulpally in Wayanad district has a unique position among the temples of Kerala, and it is also among the rarest temples in India, for it is one of the only known temples to have installed deities of Lava and Kusha, children of Sree Rama and Seetha Devi, with active worship continuing. The legend of Sita, and her children Lava and Kusa is closely linked to this temple. It is believed that even the name Pulpally is connected to the bed of grass (Dharbha) on which Lava is believed to have played as a child.

== Legend ==
The temple pond is one of the largest in Wayanad. The etymological meaning of "Seetha" denotes soil or earth. This place and the surrounding areas are believed to be the key places in the Hindu epic Ramayana. It is believed that when Seetha was abandoned by Rama, she reached Pulpally and was given shelter by the great Sage Valmiki. The place in Pulpally where Sita gave birth to Lava and Kusa, is called Valmiki Ashramam. Chedattinkavu or the Sree Chedattinkaavilamma Seethadevi Temple, is the original temple or 'moolasthanam' of Pulpally Temple. These two sites are also open for the public to visit. The Valmiki Ashramam, is to this day maintained in its original ashramam like appearance.

According to the legend Lava and Kusa the two sons of Seetha Devi stopped and caught the horse sent by Rama as part of the Ashwamedha. When Rama came to free the horse, he saw Seetha and immediately she disappeared in the earth, her mother.

While going down, her hair was caught by Rama and thus the name Chedattinkavu or Jadayattakavu to the spot. Chedattilamma (Seetha Devi) is the presiding deity of this temple along with Sapthamathrukkal. This temple is only 1km away from the present Sita Temple. Nei (ghee) vilakku is a main offering here.

The Seetha Devi temple of Pulpally was constructed by Sri Pazhassi Raja in the 18th century. He managed the temple for many years. The meetings and discussions with his army chieftains were held in the courtyard of this temple. Later the management of this temple came in the hands of the Kuppathode family and the renowned Nair family in Wayanad. At that time most of the important temples in Wayanad were managed by different Nair families. The moopil nair (the chief) of Kuppathod family stayed at Nellaratt edom the headquarters of the family. Even now, a member of this family is designated as the trustee for the management of the temple.

Another remarkable thing about this temple is that leeches, that are very common in most parts of Wayanad are not found in the area surrounding this temple. According to the legend, goddess Seetha cursed the leeches that bit Lava and Kusa and banished them from Pulpally. Another significant thing about this place is that a large number of termite mounds (valmeekam) can be seen at different spots. This is associated with the sage Valmiki, who authored the Ramayana. The temple festival, celebrated in the first week of January, also considered to be the regional festival, is attended by a large number of people belonging to different castes and creed. The temple festival which is celebrated annually in the month of January, and attracts people from various parts of Wayanad.

=== Other temples associated with the legend ===
Several nearby temples are linked in local tradition to the story of Sita, Lava and Kusha:

- Ponkuzhi Sita Temple, Muthanga – Local legend holds that this temple stands on the site where Lakshmana abandoned Sita in the forest on Rama's orders, and that a nearby lake formed from Sita's tears.
- Sree Valmiki Ashramam, Ashramam Kolli – This site is regarded in local belief as the hermitage of sage Valmiki, where the abandoned Sita was given refuge and later gave birth to her twin sons, Lava and Kusha. The site is maintained in a simple hermitage style, with a thatched structure, and nearby is a rock called Munipara, associated with Ratnakara's tapasya.
- Irulam Sree Seetha Devi Lava–Kusha Temple – According to local tradition, this temple marks the place where Sita and her sons rested after a day in the forest; it is believed that Shiva and Vishnu directed them here for protection.
- Sisumala Sita Lava Kusha Temple – This temple is said to be located where Lava and Kusha used to roam under Sita's supervision. The name Sisumala is interpreted locally as meaning “children's hill” in Malayalam.
