= Our Lady of Lourde's Church (Pallikkunnu Church) =

Catholic church in Kerala, India

Our Lady of Lourdes Church
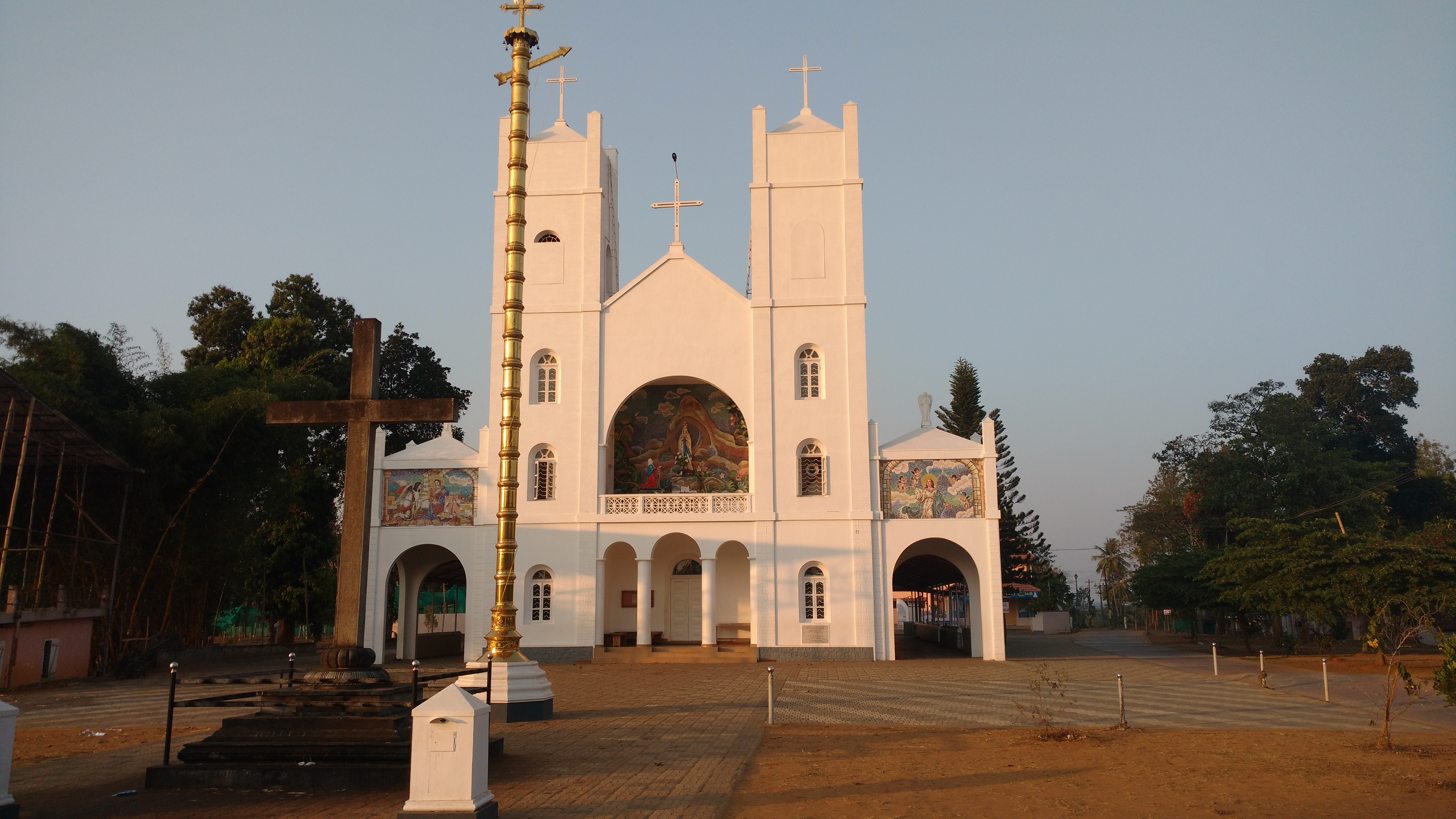
- Pallikunnu Church

Religion
- Affiliation: Catholic
- Year consecrated: 1908

Location
- Location: 11°41′6.1″N 76°3′21.72″E
- Interactive map of Our Lady of Lourdes Church

Pallikkunnu Church, also known as Our Lady of Lourdes Church, is a pilgrim centre in North Kerala. This is a Latin Catholic church The festival is on February 2 to 18. Main days are 10th and 11th.

Pallikkunnu Church was built by a French priest Fr. Jefreno in 1908. Approximate distance to the church from Kalpetta is 14 kilometers.

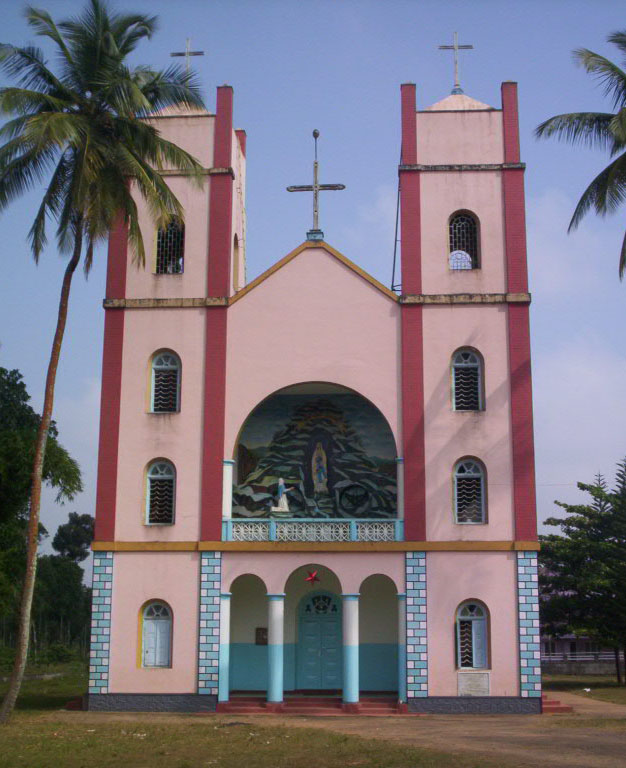
Old Church
