= Velankanni (disambiguation) =

Velankanni may refer to:

- Velankanni, a pilgrim town near Nagapattinam in the Indian state of Tamil Nadu
  - Our Lady of Good Health, or Velankanni Matha an apparition of Mary, mother of Jesus in Velankanni
    - Basilica of Our Lady of Good Health, a Roman Catholic shrine and church in the town of Velankanni
    - Annai Velankanni, 1971 Indian film about the apparition
  - Velankanni railway station, a train station in Velankanni, India
- Graha Maria Annai Velangkanni, a Roman Catholic church in Indo Mughal style dedicated to the apparition of Mary in Velankanni; in Medan, Indonesia
- Our Lady of Good Health Church, Mathigiri, a Roman Catholic church dedicated to the apparition of Mary in Velankanni; in Tamil Nadu, India
- Our Lady of Good Health Church, Pattumala, a Roman Catholic church dedicated to the apparition of Mary in Velankanni; in Kerala, India
- Velankanni Matriculation And Higher Secondary School, a school in Ashok Nagar, Chennai, Tamil Nadu, India

== See also ==
- Annai (disambiguation)
