= Our Lady of Good Health (disambiguation) =

Our Lady of Good Health is a title given to the Blessed Virgin Mary and an apparition of Mary in India.

Our Lady of Good Health may also refer to:

- Basilica of Our Lady of Good Health, in Velankanni, Tamil Nadu India
- Our Lady of Good Health Church, Pattumala, a pilgrim shrine in Kerala, India

== See also ==
- Holy Infant of Good Health
- Good health (disambiguation)
