= Annai =

Annai may refer to:

- Annai, Guyana, a small village in the Upper Takutu-Upper Essequibo Region of Guyana
- Annai (1962 film), an Indian Tamil-language film
- Annai (2000 film), an Indian Tamil-language film by Manobala
- Annai Velankanni, a 1971 Indian Tamil-language film about an apparition of the Virgin Mary in Velankanni, India

== See also ==
- Anai, Japanese surname
- Anna (disambiguation)
- Velankanni (disambiguation)
- Our Lady of Good Health, a celebrated Catholic title of the Blessed Virgin Mary, also known as Annai Velankanni based on her apparition in Velankanni, India
