= Our Lady of La Leche =

Catholic statue

Our Lady of La Leche "Nuestra Señora de La Leche y Buen Parto"'
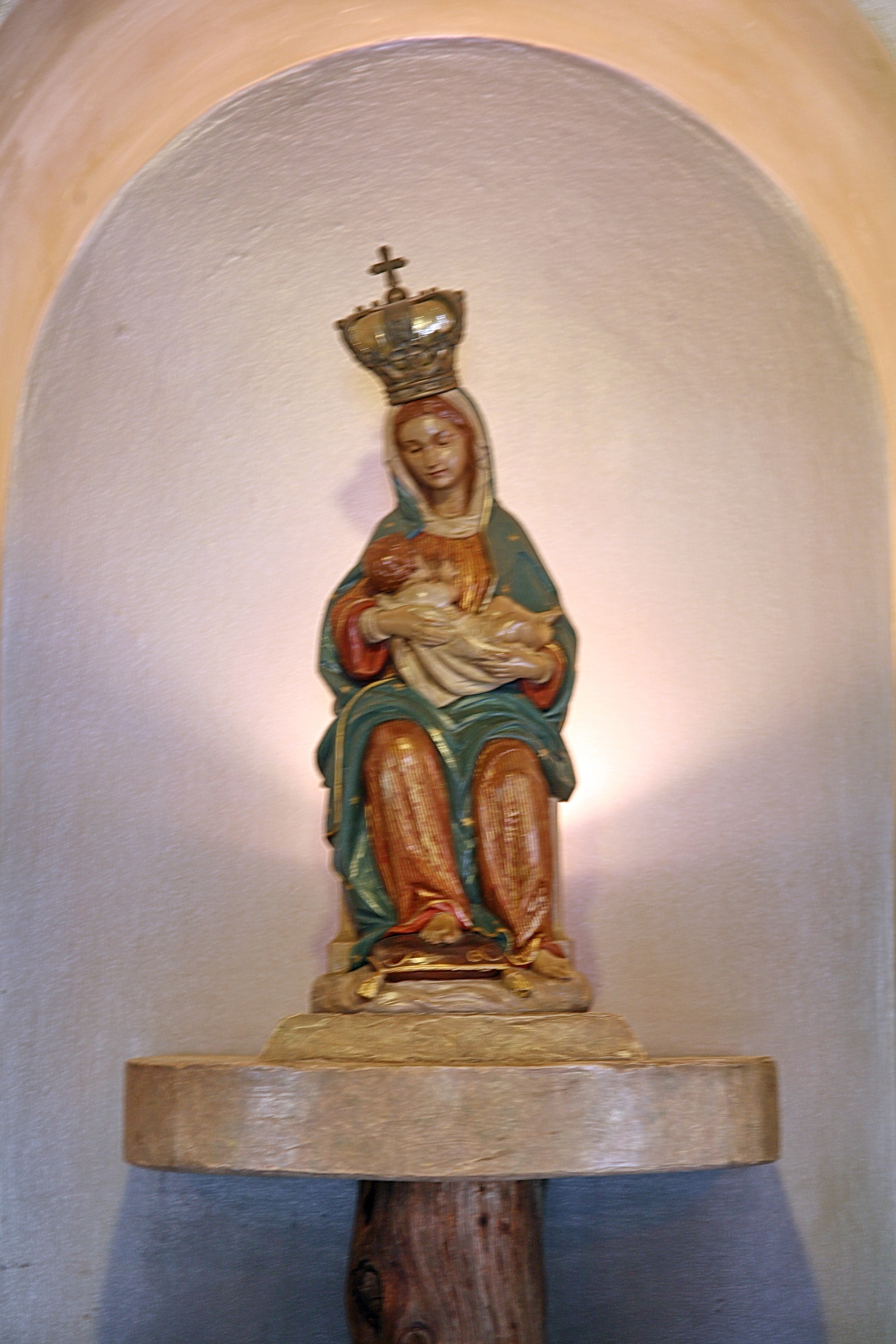
- Image of Our Lady of La Leche
- Venerated in: Catholic Church
- Major shrine: National Shrine of Our Lady of La Leche, St. Augustine, Florida, United States
- Feast: 11 October
- Attributes: Blessed Virgin Mary nursing the infant Jesus
- Patronage: Florida, nursing mothers, pregnant mothers, motherhood

Our Lady of La Leche (Spanish: Nuestra Señora de La Leche y Buen Parto; "Our Lady of the Milk and Good Delivery") is a Catholic title of the Blessed Virgin Mary associated with a statue of her breastfeeding the infant Jesus Christ. It is said to be one of the oldest of all Marian devotions.

Dating back to the Early Church, the image was later widely venerated by Spanish Catholics in the early modern era, some of whom brought the image and devotion to the New World and what would become the United States.

== History ==
Our Lady of La Leche is an ancient devotion to the Blessed Virgin Mary dating back to the time of the Roman Empire, where Christians depicted the infant Jesus nursing at Mary's breast on the walls of the Roman Catacombs, where they were known to congregate and worship.

It has been traditionally associated with pregnancy and successful deliveries, for which devotees would pray with the intercession of the Blessed Virgin.

The popularity of the devotion grew in Spain, especially in Madrid in the late 16th century and eventually made its way to the New World by means of Spanish settlers.

=== North America ===
Notably, a group of Spanish colonists—including free and enslaved Afro-Spaniards—built a shrine to Our Lady of La Leche at Mission Nombre de Dios in St. Augustine, Florida in the early 17th century. The move arose from a call by King Philip II to construct such a shrine in Madrid, following his hearing of the devotion and reports of its results. The Florida shrine is a replica of the Spanish, the latter being destroyed in 1937 during the Spanish Civil War.

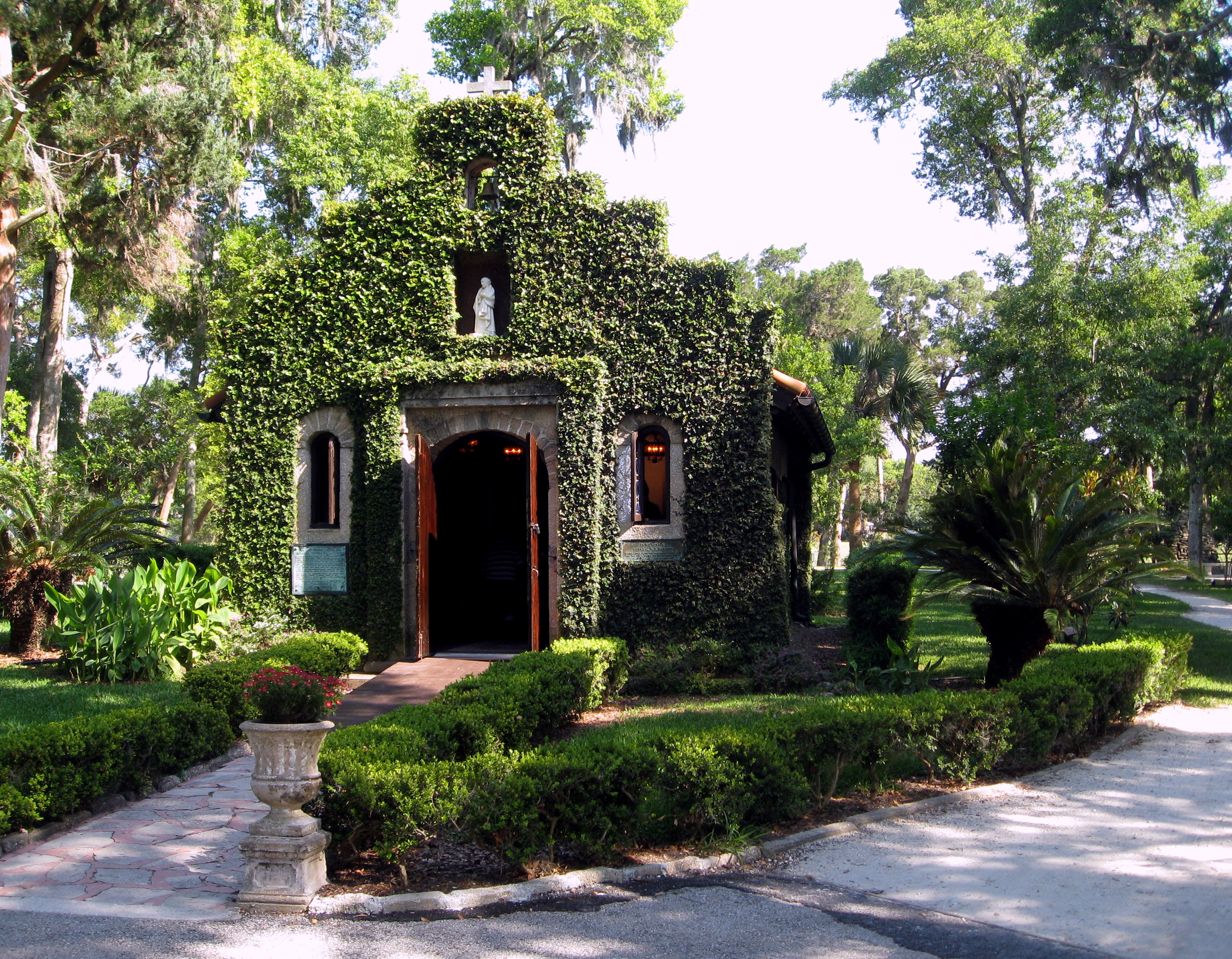
The National Shrine of Our Lady of La Leche in St. Augustine, Florida.

Spanish explorers, under the command of Pedro Menéndez de Avilés and the spiritual chaplaincy of Fr Francisco López de Mendoza Grajales, OFM, had arrived in northern Florida in 1565. Grajalez celebrated there the first Mass in what would become the United States. The mission established there, Mission Nombre de Dios, was also the first in that regard.

Today, the National Shrine of Our Lady of La Leche (founded in 1609) is the oldest Catholic or Marian shrine in the United States. It was canonically crowned on behalf of Pope Francis in 2021.

== See also ==
- Spanish Florida
- Mission Nombre de Dios
- New Spain
- Shrines to the Virgin Mary
