= Mission Nombre de Dios =

Historic Spanish Catholic mission in St. Augustine, FL, USA

Coordinates: 29°54′18.3″N 81°18′57.8″W

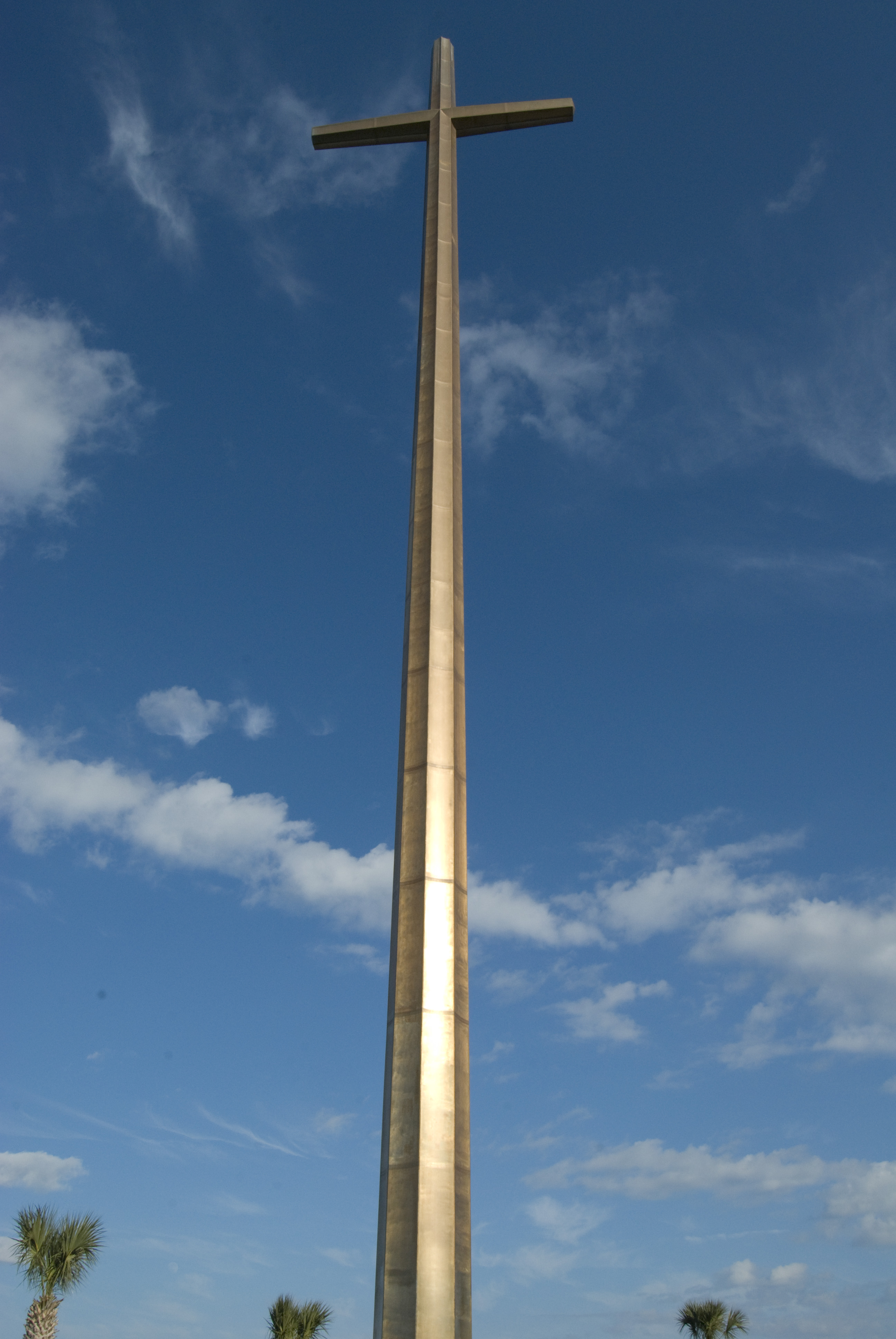
208-foot cross

Mission Nombre de Dios is a Catholic mission founded in 1587 in St. Augustine, Florida, on the west side of Matanzas Bay. It is part of the Diocese of St. Augustine and is likely the oldest extant mission in the continental United States. The National Shrine of Our Lady of La Leche, the oldest shrine in that region, is located on the mission grounds.

== History ==
The mission traces its origins to September 8, 1565, when Admiral Pedro Menéndez de Avilés landed with a band of settlers to found St. Augustine. Fr Francisco López de Mendoza Grajales, OFM, the chaplain of the expedition, celebrated the first Thanksgiving Mass on the grounds. The formal Franciscan mission was founded at the landing point in 1587, perhaps the first mission in what would become the continental United States. The mission served nearby villages of the Mocama, a Timucua group, and was at the center of an important chiefdom in the late 16th and 17th century.

First the Jesuits and later the Franciscans ministered to the resident Spanish colonists, and made some efforts to evangelize the local Mocama and Agua Dulce peoples near St. Augustine. They were particularly successful in the Mocama village known as Nombre de Dios, converting the chief and her daughter. In 1587, at the beginning of the Franciscans' first major missionization push, a mission was founded at Nombre de Dios, served by a resident friar.

== Grounds and features ==
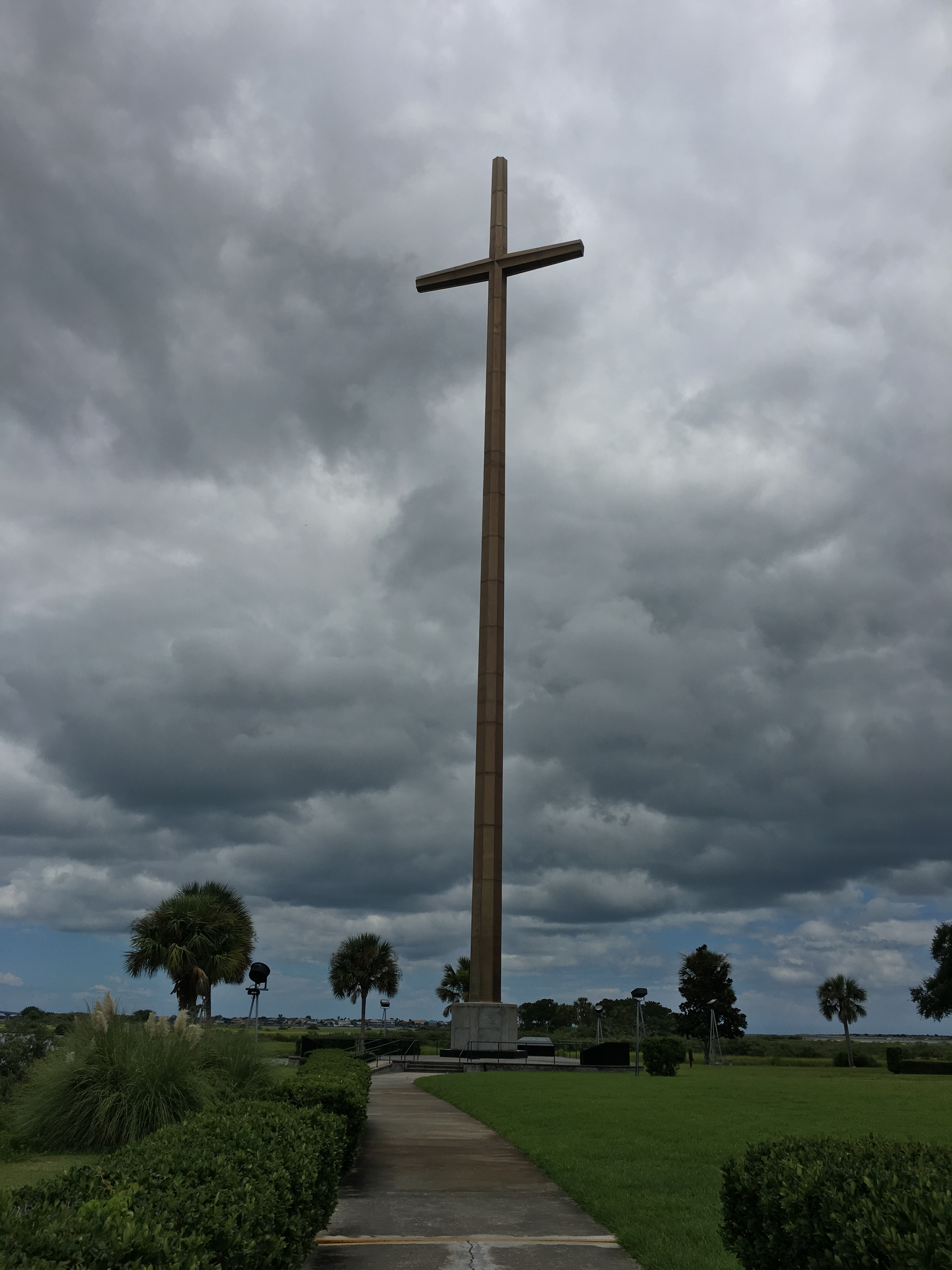
The Great Cross

=== The Great Cross ===
The Great Cross was dedicated by Archbishop Casimiro Morcillo of the Roman Catholic Archdiocese of Madrid during the diocesan Eucharistic Congress of October 1966 at the direction of Archbishop Joseph P. Hurley to celebrate the 400th anniversary of the founding of the Mission Nombre de Dios. It is made of stainless steel and towers 208 feet above the Matanzas marshes.

=== Museum ===
The Mission Nombre de Dios Museum features the original casket of the founder of St. Augustine, Pedro Menéndez de Avilés, though his remains are located in Avilés, Spain. The museum's exhibits also include vestments and chalices from the Diocese of St. Augustine's archives, artifacts found during the archaeological excavations of the mission grounds, and coquina that was part of the original foundation of the chapel. Reproductions of the oldest written European documents in the U.S. and the 1155 document from Avilés, Spain are also in the museum, along with paintings by artist by JoAnn Crisp-Ellert and a diorama of the first parish Mass. The museum opened in 2010 and does not charge an admission fee.

=== Prince of Peace Votive Church ===
The Prince of Peace Votive Church was constructed in 1965 and is situated at the San Marco Avenue entrance to the Nombre de Dios Mission grounds. It was built to celebrate the 400th anniversary of the mission's founding. It is made of coquina and has a large stained glass window depicting a representation of the Holy Spirit. It also features a replica of the Our Lady of La Leche statue. The church is used for adoration, weddings, funerals, and Mass on special occasions. It is "dedicated to prayers that God would spare the world from atomic warfare."

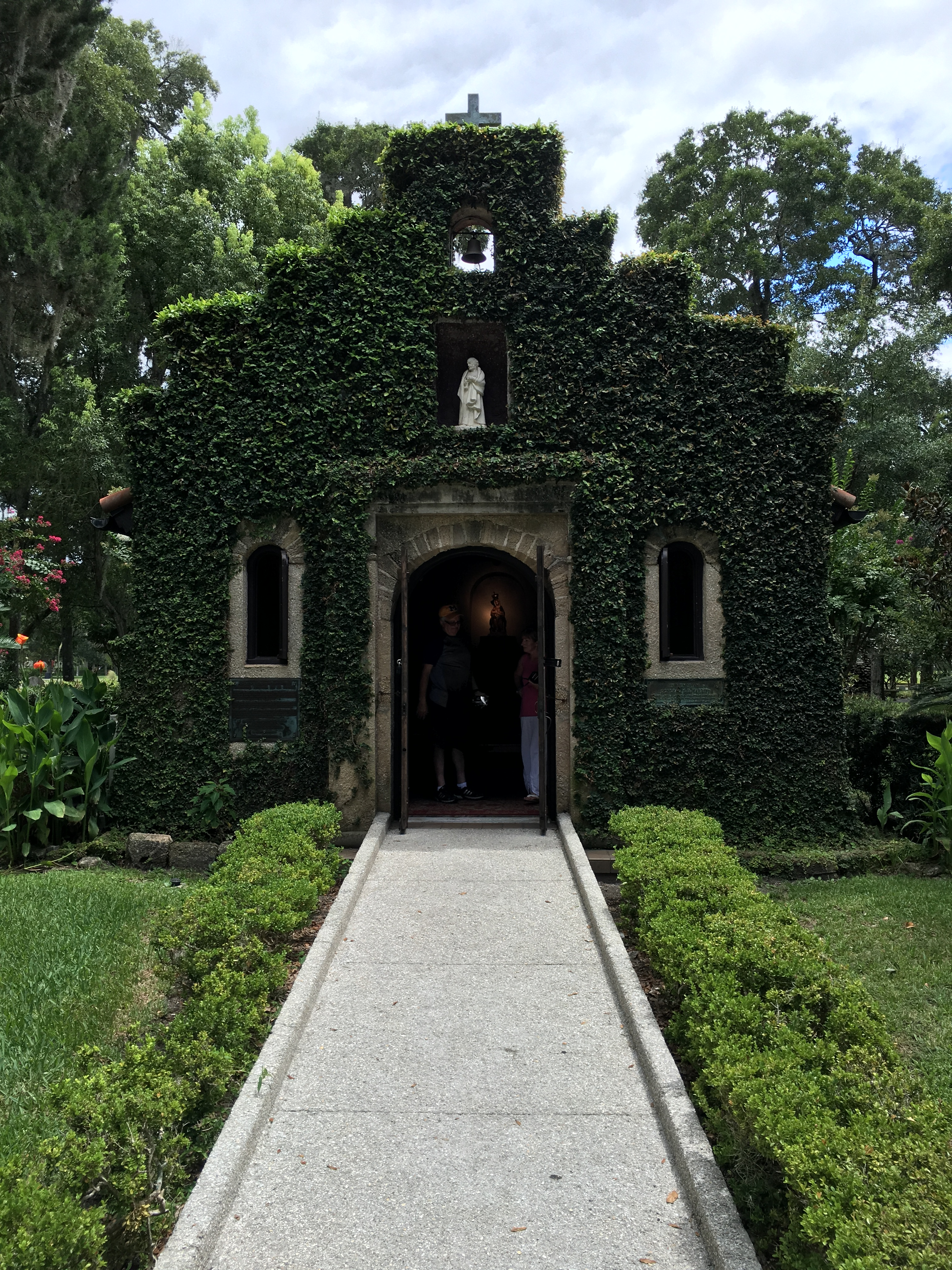
Front of Shrine of Our Lady of La Leche

=== National Shrine of Our Lady of La Leche ===
The devotion to Our Lady of La Leche was brought over from Spain in the late 1500s, and the mission grounds served as the site of the Shrine of Our Lady of La Leche, the first Marian shrine in the United States. The centerpiece of the shrine is a statue of the Virgin Mary nursing the infant Jesus, which is a replica of the Our Lady of La Leche statue placed in a cathedral in Spain by Phillip III. The original chapel was destroyed in 1728 during the British siege of St. Augustine and was rebuilt in 1875 by Bishop Augustin Verot, though it later suffered damage from a hurricane. The current ivy-covered chapel, which seats about 30 people, was built in 1914 and is a replica of previous chapels built of coquina. The shrine is a popular religious pilgrimage site, with many visitors seeking blessings and intercessions for successful pregnancy and delivery.

In October 2019, the United States Conference of Catholic Bishops elevated the shrine to national shrine status. It was scheduled to receive a canonical coronation on October 10, 2020, later rescheduled to the same date in 2021 due to the COVID-19 pandemic.

=== Other features ===
Mission Nombre de Dios's grounds include archaeological excavations, a historic cemetery, Marian Shrines to Our Lady of Perpetual Help and Our Lady of Guadalupe, a gift shop, a bell tower, fountains, the rustic altar, mission plaques and historical markers, monuments of the Seven Sorrows of Mary, and statues of Father López, Saint Francis of Assisi, and Saint Joseph.
