= Good health =

Good health may refer to:

- Good Health, a 2002 album by Pretty Girls Make Graves
- Good Health (journal), edited by American physician John Harvey Kellogg
- a phrase uttered during a toast
- To Your Good Health!, a Russian fairytale

== See also ==
- Holy Infant of Good Health, a statue in Mexico said to possess miraculous powers
- Our Lady of Good Health (disambiguation)
