= Our Lady of Good Health =

Title of the Blessed Virgin Mary

Our Lady of Good Health புனித ஆரோக்கிய அன்னை Our Lady of Vailankanni Holy Mother of Good Health
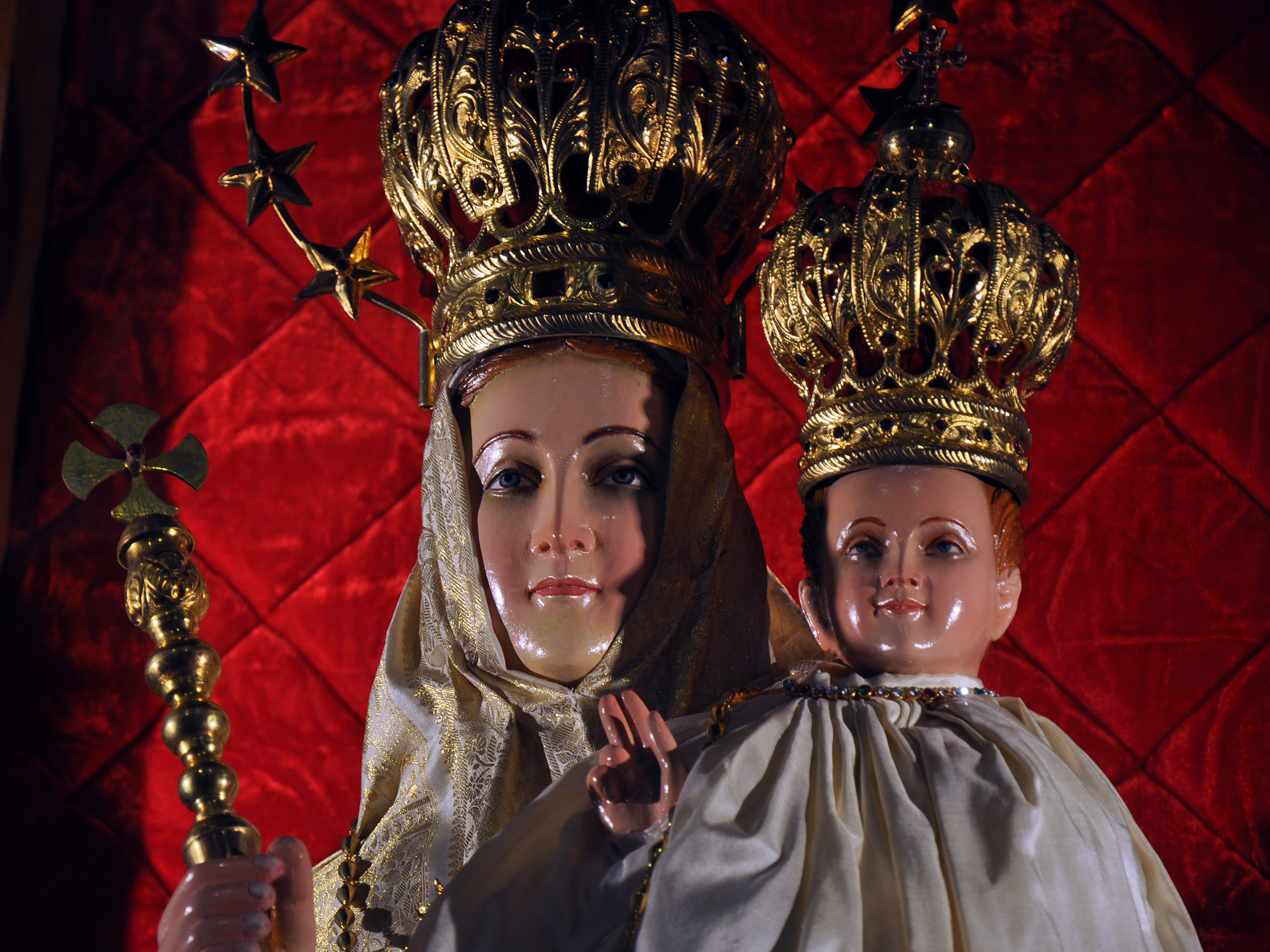
- Location: Velankanni, Tamil Nadu, India
- Date: 16th and 17th century
- Witness: Young boy
- Type: Marian apparition
- Approval: Nihil obstat granted by the Dicastery for the Doctrine of the Faith 1 August 2024
- Venerated in: Catholic Church
- Shrine: Basilica of Our Lady of Good Health
- Feast day: 8 September (Nativity of Mary)

Our Lady of Good Health (Tamil: ஆரோக்கிய அன்னை, romanized: Ārōkkiya annai), also known as Our Lady of Vailankanni, is a title given to the Blessed Virgin Mary by devotees. She is said to have appeared twice in the town of Velankanni, Tamil Nadu, India, in the 16th to 17th centuries.

== History ==
Accounts of the Marian apparitions at Velankanni have been passed down through oral tradition from the 16th century; as well as the rescue of a vessel of the Portuguese in Goa and Bombay, who were sailing through a deadly storm, off the coast of the Coromandel region in the 17th century.

According to tradition, the first apparition is said to have occurred to a young boy delivering buttermilk to a man, who lived far away. During his travels, the boy stopped to rest beside a lake that was shaded by a Banyan tree. A beautiful woman, carrying a child, is said to have appeared, and asked the boy for some milk to feed her child, which he gave. When he reached the home for his milk delivery, he apologised for the delay and that there would be less milk in his pot. But when they opened the lid of the milk pot, the container was brimming with milk.

The second apparition is alleged to have occurred a few years later. A lame boy would sell buttermilk to passing travellers, who would pause in the shade of a large Banyan tree, to escape the heat of the day. However, he had no customers. According to the account, suddenly, an ethereal woman, holding a child appeared before him, and asked for a cup of buttermilk. He gave her a cup, which she fed to her child. The woman asked the boy to go to Nagapattinam, and find a certain Catholic Christian man in the town & tell him to build a chapel at Velankanni in her honour. Apparently cured, the boy ran to Nagapattinam, where he found the man and told him his story. The Catholic Christian men of Nagapattinam subsequently built a thatched chapel at Vailankanni, dedicated to Mary under the title of "Our Lady of Good Health".

In the 17th century, a Portuguese merchant vessel sailing from Macao to Ceylon, was caught in a severe storm in the Bay of Bengal. The sailors fervently invoked Virgin Mary through her title Star of the Sea to be saved & promised to build a church in her honour wherever they could land. The sea became calm, and their ship landed near Vailankanni on 8 September, on the day of St Mary's Feast. To honour their promise, the Portuguese rebuilt the thatched chapel into a stone church. The church was later renovated twice in the early 20th century.

Although these apparitions have not been formally approved by the Holy See, they were implicitly approved by Pope John XXIII's 1962 elevation of the Vailankanni church to minor basilica status. The Pope's apostolic brief noted that pilgrims in large numbers had been visiting the shrine for a long period of time, and that it was hailed as the "Lourdes of the East".

In August 2024, the Dicastery for the Doctrine of the Faith's Cardinal Víctor Manuel Fernández confirmed to Bishop Sagayaraj Thamburaj, of Pope Francis' approval of the devotion to Our Lady of Good Health at the Basilica of Our Lady of Good Health.

== Basilica ==
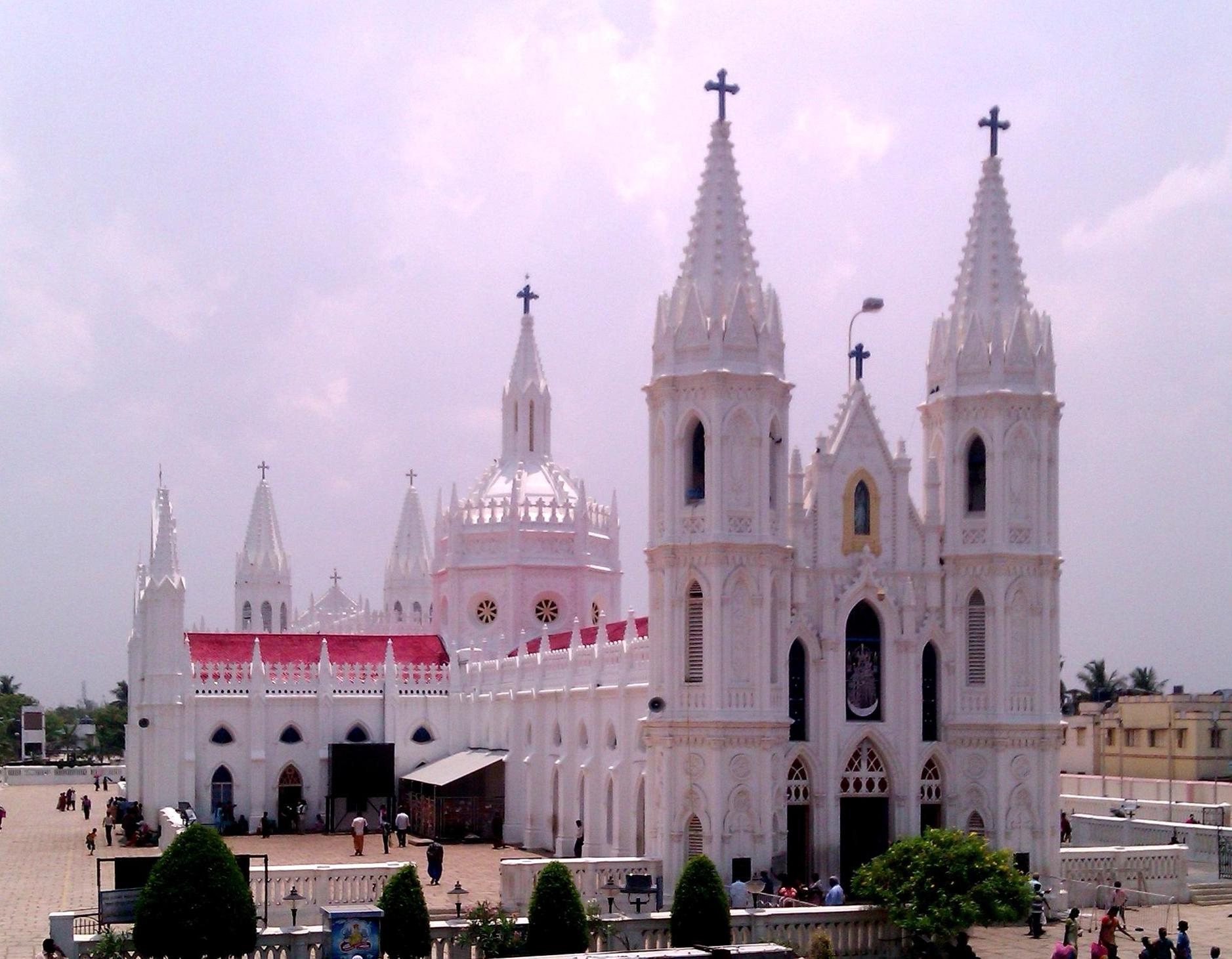
Basilica of Our Lady of Good Health

A Gothic-styled basilica stands in Velankanni in memory of the apparitions. The basilica erected by the Portuguese and the Indians stands at the site where the buttermilk seller saw Mary and Jesus. The iconic depiction of the Madonna is unique in that it is one of two only icons where Mary is portrayed wearing an Indian Sari, while the other statue is said to have been buried with Aurangzeb, the Mughal Emperor. The basilica is known as a site for pilgrims from all over India and its assembly of multilingual prayers every day.

== Feast day ==
8 September, the Feast of the Nativity of Mary, is also commemorated as the feast of Our Lady of Good Health. The celebration starts on 29 August and ends on the day of the feast. The feast day prayers are said in Tamil, Marathi, East Indian, Malayalam, Telugu, Kannada, Konkani, Hindi and English.

== Churches and shrines ==
The following churches and shrines in locations around the world are dedicated to Our Lady of Good Health.

=== Australia ===
- Shrine of Our Mother of Good Health - Velankanni, Bacchus Marsh, Victoria; All Nations Marian Centre, Merrimu, Australia
- Shrine to Our Lady of Good Health, Vailankanni, at the Shrine of Our Lady Help of Christians, Brisbane, Australia
- Berrima Candle Chapel, Our Lady of Good Health, Vailankanni, at the Shrine of Our Lady of Mercy Penrose Park, New South Wales, Australia

=== Canada ===
- Our Lady of Good Health Parish Church, Toronto (Scarborough) Ontario, Canada

=== India ===
==== Andhra Pradesh ====
- Arockia Matha Punya Kshethramu, Kadapa, Andhra Pradesh, India

==== Goa ====
- Our Lady of Good Health Church, Cuncolim, Goa, India

==== Karnataka ====
- St. Mary's Basilica, Shivajinagar, Bangalore, Karnataka, India
- Annai Vailankanni Chapel, Pottery Town, Bangalore, Karnataka, India
- Our Lady of Vailankanni Church, Yelahanka, Bangalore, Karnataka, India
- Church of Our Lady of Vailankanni, Farla, Bantwal, Karnataka, India
- Basilica of Our Lady of Health, Harihar, Karnataka, India
- Our Lady of Health Church, Mallapur, Karwar, Karnataka, India
- Our Lady of Health Church, Shirva, Karnataka, India
- Our Lady of Velankanni Shrine, at the Stella Maris Church, Kalmady, Udupi, Karnataka, India

==== Kerala ====
- Our Lady of Good Health Church, Pattumala, Kerala, India
- Our Lady of Velankanni Matha Shrine, Tuet, Kollam, Kerala, India
- Annai Velankanni Shrine, Anna Nagar, Madurai, Tamil Nadu

==== Maharashtra ====
- Church Of Our Lady Of Good Health Velankanni, Vile Parle, Mumbai, Maharashtra
- Church of lady of Good health Bhatte bunder Uttan gorai Bhyandhar,(Mumbai) , Maharashtra

==== Tamil Nadu ====
- Annai Vailankanni Shrine, Besant Nagar, Chennai, Tamil Nadu, India
- https://littlemountshrine.com/

Our Lady of Health and St.Thomas the Apostle Shrine, Littlemount, Chennai, Tamil Nadu, India

- Basilica of Our Lady of Good Health, Velankanni (Lourdes of the East), Tamil Nadu, India
- Our Lady of Good Health Church, Pannur, Tiruvallur, Tamil Nadu, India
- Our Lady of Velankanni Church, Selvapuram, Coimbatore, Tamil Nadu, India
- Our Lady of Good Health Church, Kottapattu, Tiruchirappalli, Tamil Nadu, India
- Our Lady of Good Health Church, Periakulathupatty, Tiruchirappalli, Tamil Nadu, India
- Our Lady of Good Health Church, Vadipatti, Madurai, Tamil Nadu, India
- Our Lady of Good Health Church, Pozhichalur, Chennai, Tamil Nadu, India
- our lady of good health church, Sriperumbudur, Kanchipuram, Tamil Nadu, India.

==== Telangana ====
- Shrine of Our Lady of Health, Khairatabad, Hyderabad, Telangana, India
- Shrine of Our Lady of Vailankanni, Shamshabad, Hyderabad, Telangana, India

=== Indonesia ===
- Graha Maria Annai Velangkanni, Medan, North Sumatra, Indonesia

=== Malaysia ===
- Chapel of Our Lady of Good Health, Kampung Pandan, Kuala Lumpur, Malaysia

=== Mozambique ===
- Igreja de Nossa Senhora da Saúde (Church of Our Lady of Good Health), Nampula, Mozambique

=== Portugal ===
- Santuário da Senhora da Saúde (Sanctuary of Our Lady of Good Health), Póvoa de Varzim, Portugal

=== South Africa ===
- Our Lady Of Vailankanni Catholic Church, Durban, South Africa*
- Our Lady of Good Health Church, Pietermaritzburg, South Africa

=== Sri Lanka ===
- Annai Velankanni Church, Colombo, Sri Lanka
- Our Lady of Good Health Church, Mabola, Sri Lanka
- Our Lady of Good Health Church, Sedawatta, Wellampitiya, Sri Lanka

=== United States ===
- An oratory inside the Crypt Church at Basilica of the National Shrine of the Immaculate Conception, Washington, D.C., United States. The Indian American Catholic Association of the Diocese of Arlington, Virginia has conducted a pilgrimage to Vailankaani for the past twenty-five years.
- A shrine to Our Lady of Good Health has been erected inside Holy Family of Nazareth Roman Catholic parish in Irving, Texas. A nine day Novena is celebrated every year at the parish by the Dallas Tamil Catholics Association.

=== Nigeria ===
- A Grotto of Our Lady of Good Health has been erected inside the grounds of the Institute of Consecrated Life in Africa (InCLA) in Bwari Area Council, Abuja Nigeria.

InCLA is an institution of the Claretian Missionaries.

== Movie ==
The Tamil language film Annai Velankanni was made in honor of Our Lady of Good Health with the title Annai Velankanni in 1971. It was directed by K. Thankappan, starring Gemini Ganesan, Kamal Haasan, K. R. Vijaya, Jayalalitha and Padmini.

== Gallery ==
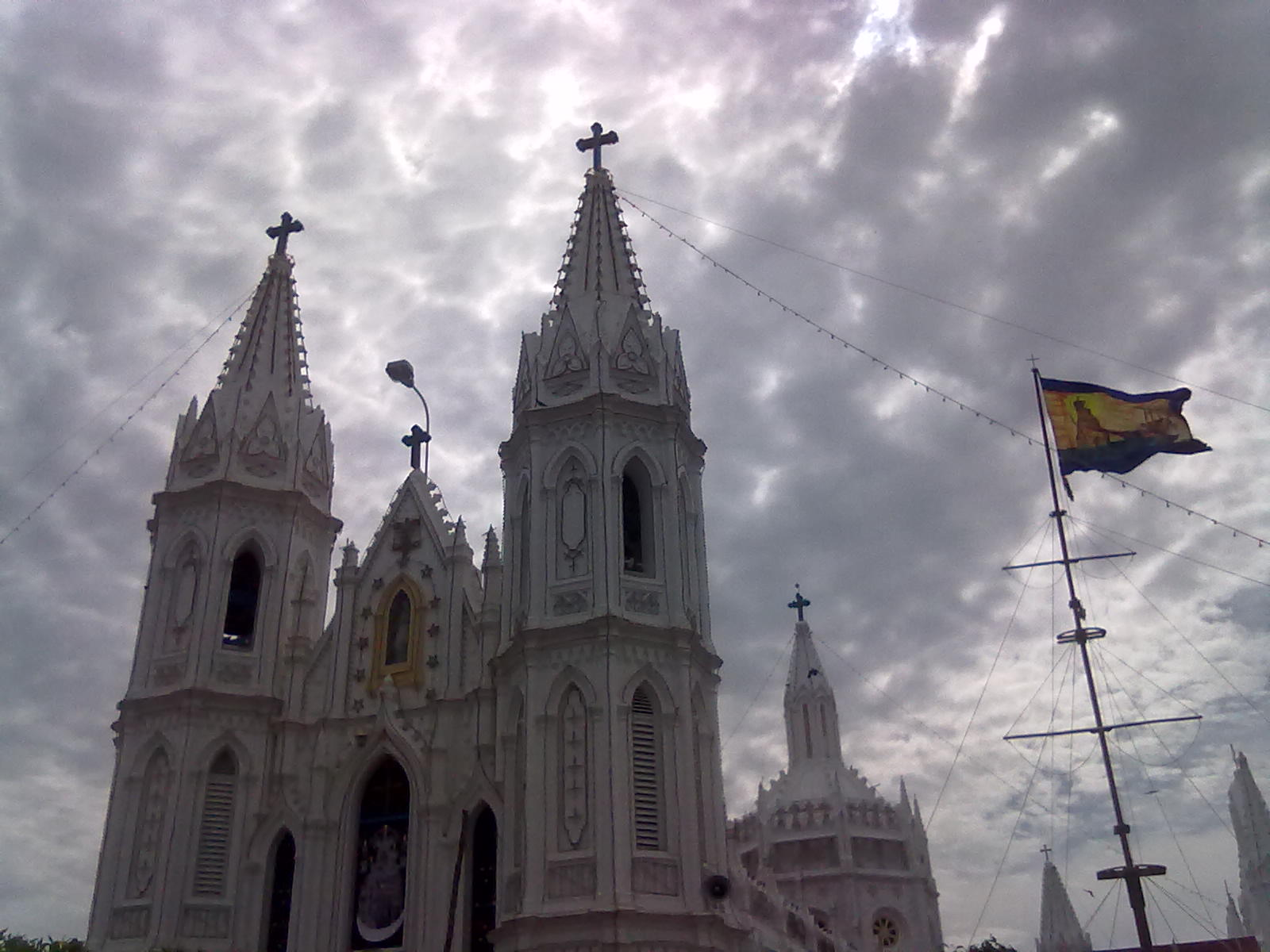
Velankanni Main Basilica and Flag during Feast

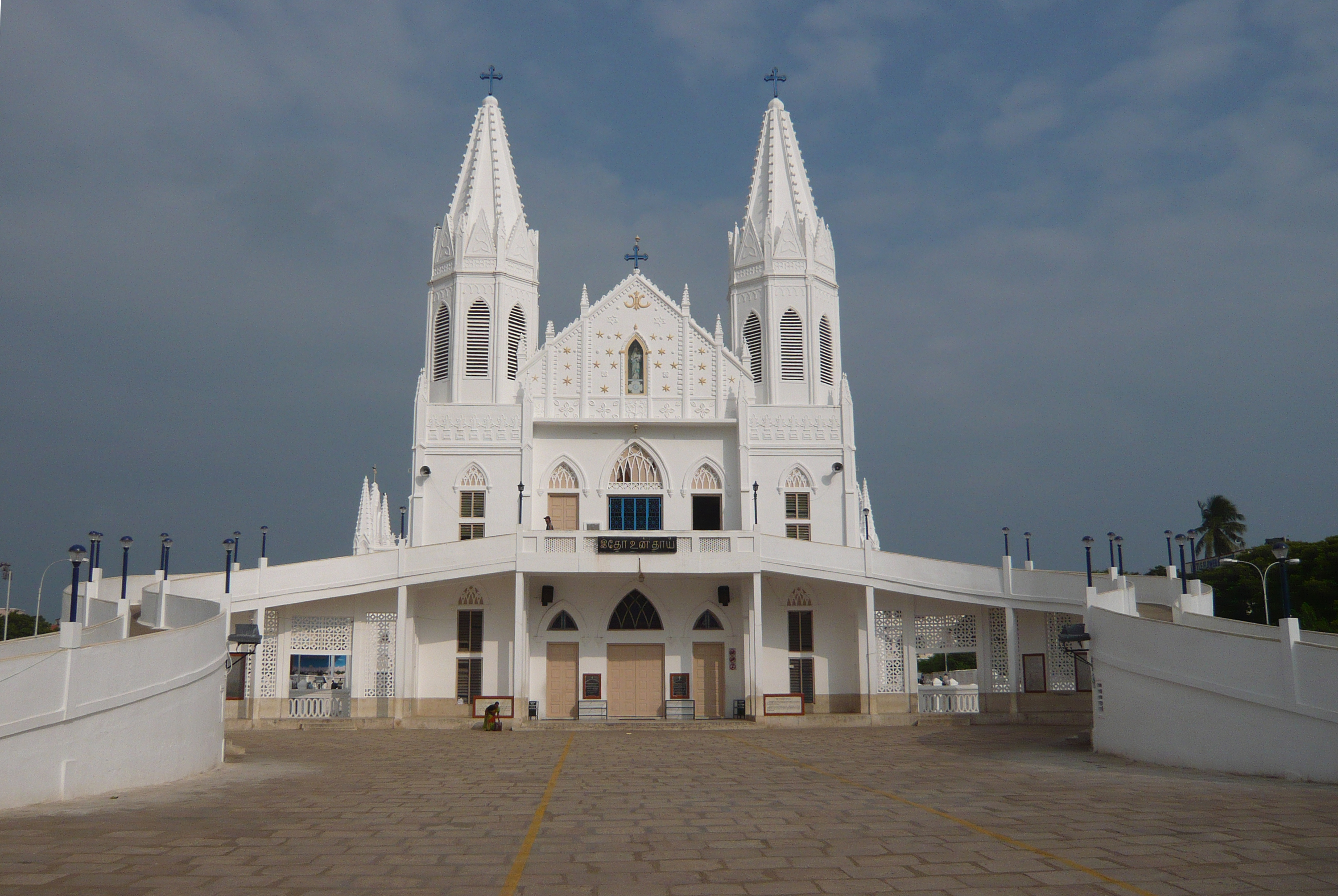
Velankanni Basilica - Extension - Front View

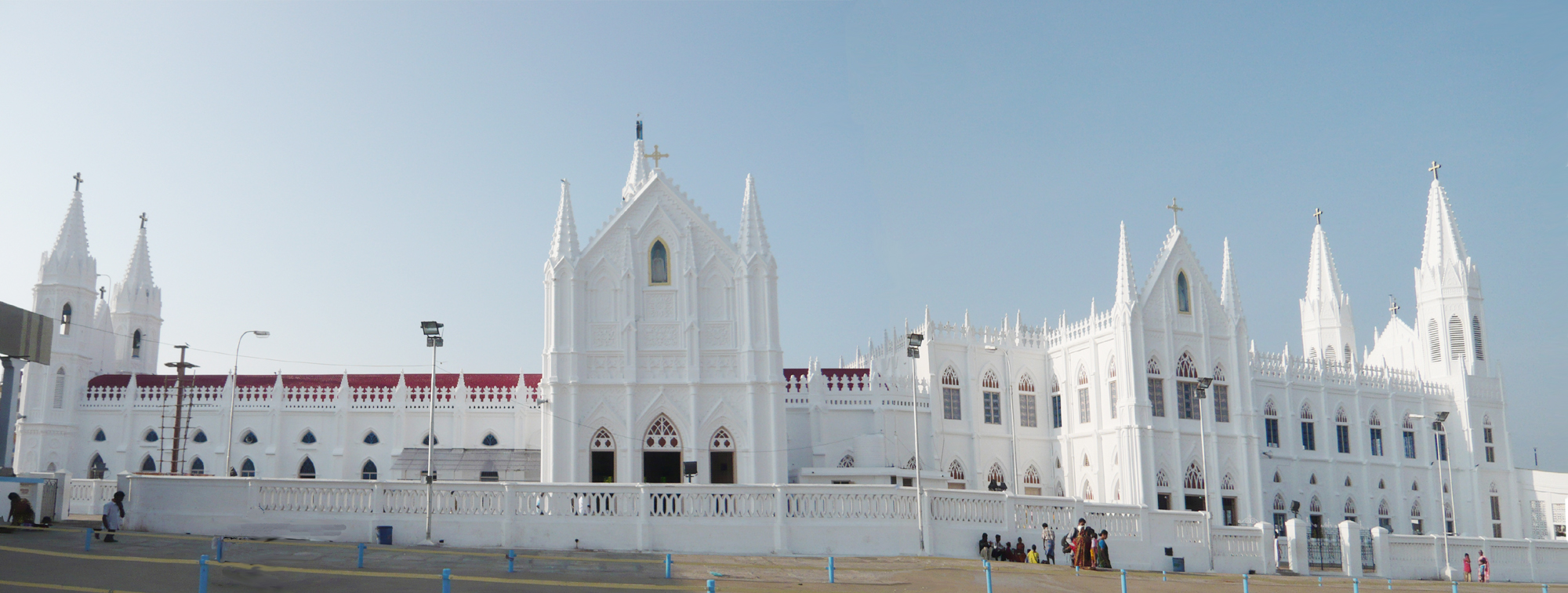
Veilankanni Basilica - A Panoramic Side View - Church and Church Extension seen at a stretch

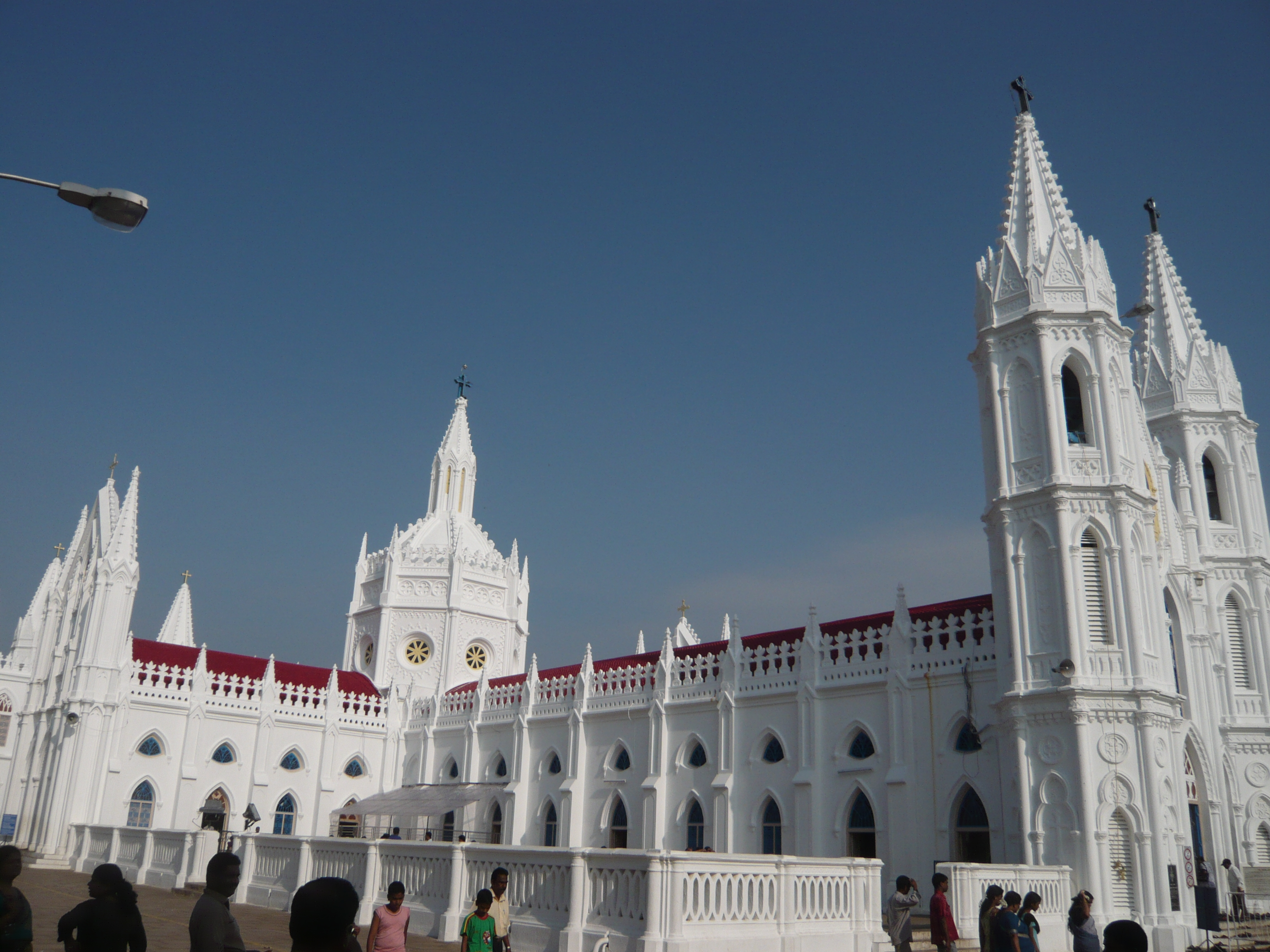
Veilankanni Basilica - Left side view

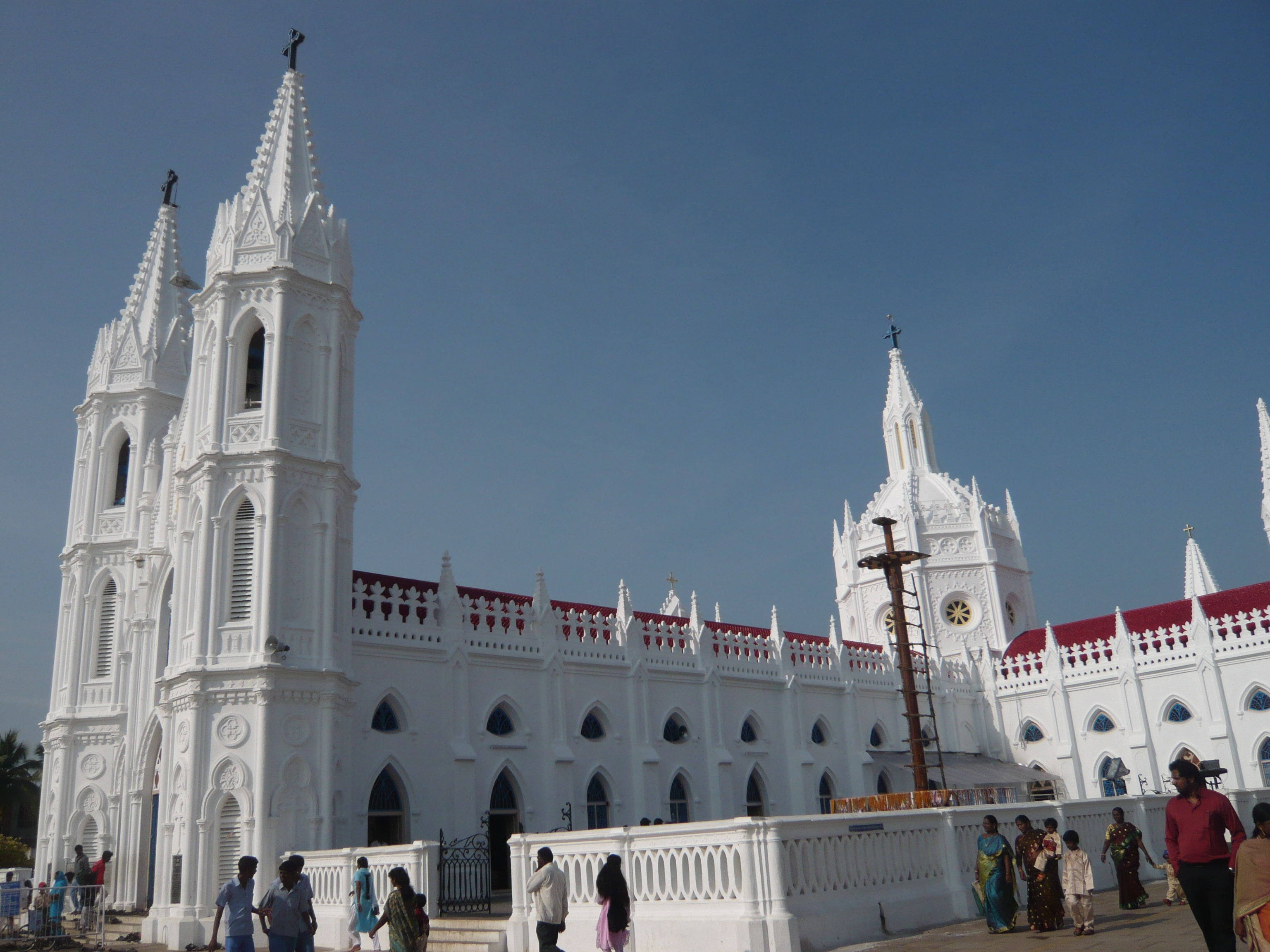
Veilankanni Basilica - Right side view

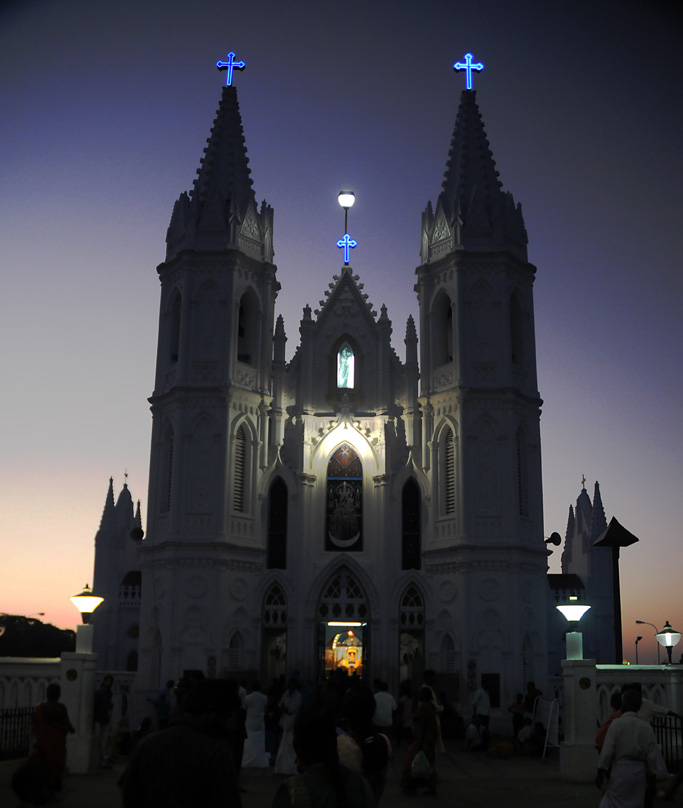
Veilankanni Basilica at Dusk

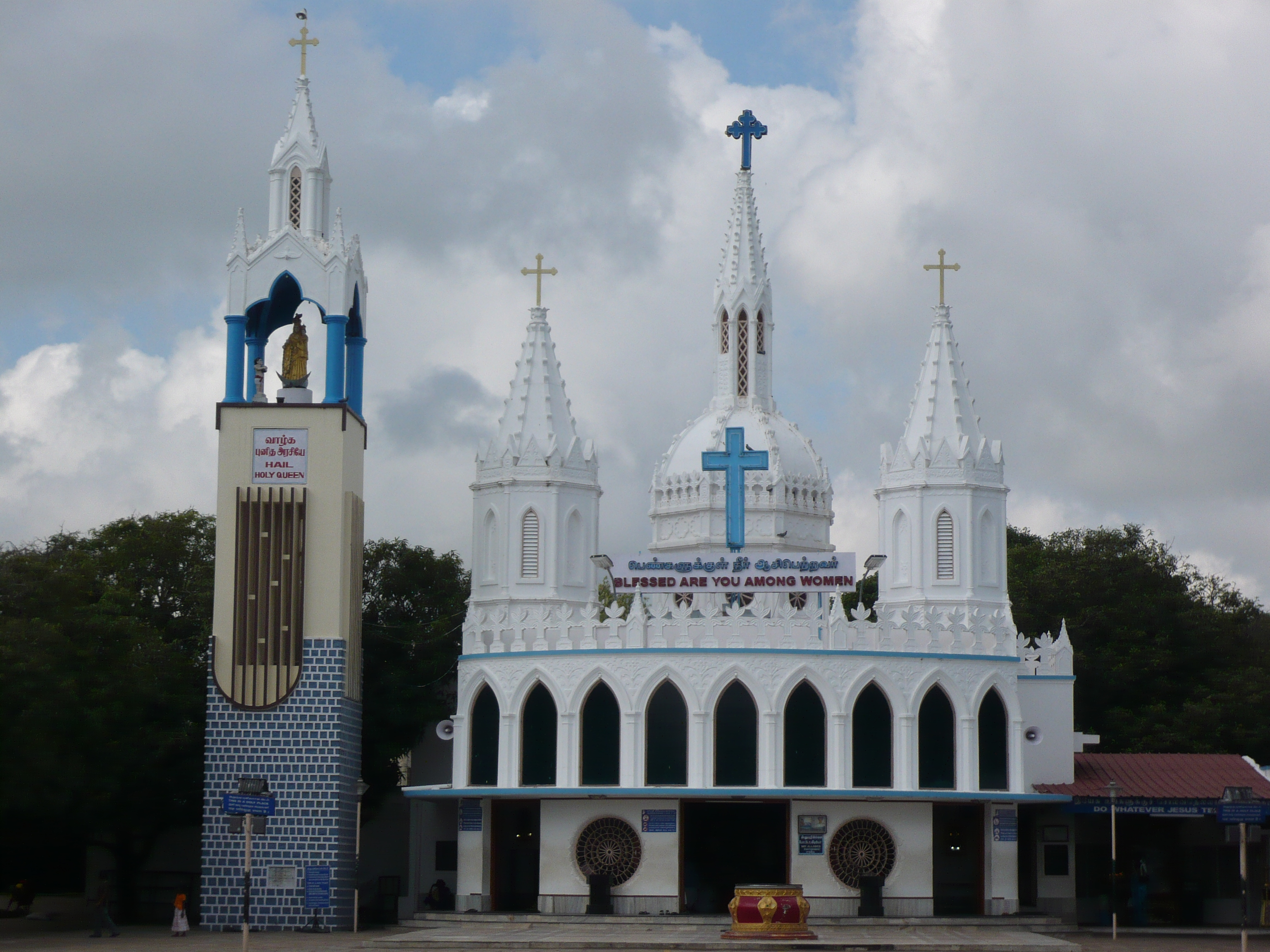
Veilankanni Church Pond

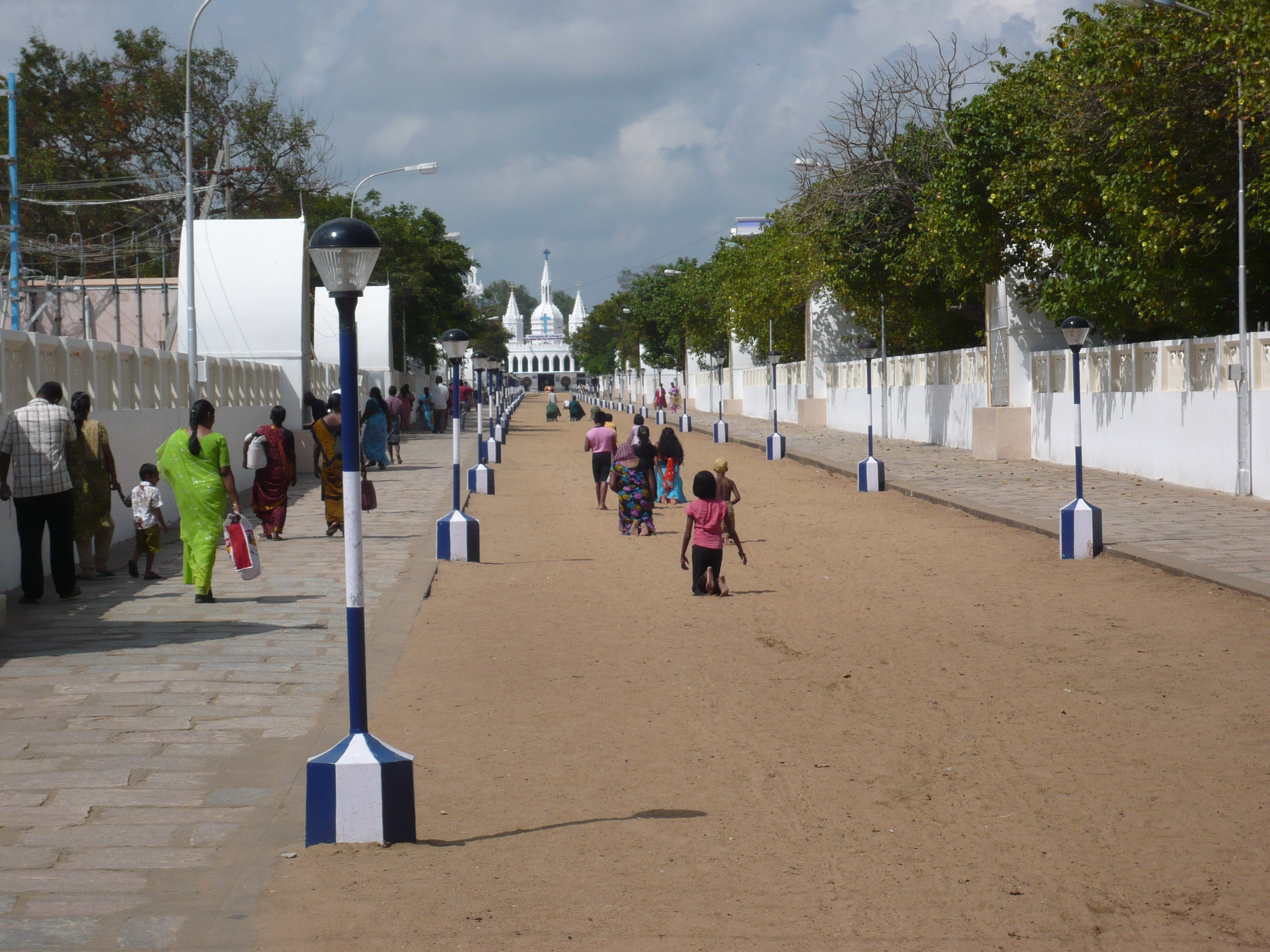
Pilgrims walking on their knees towards the Pond

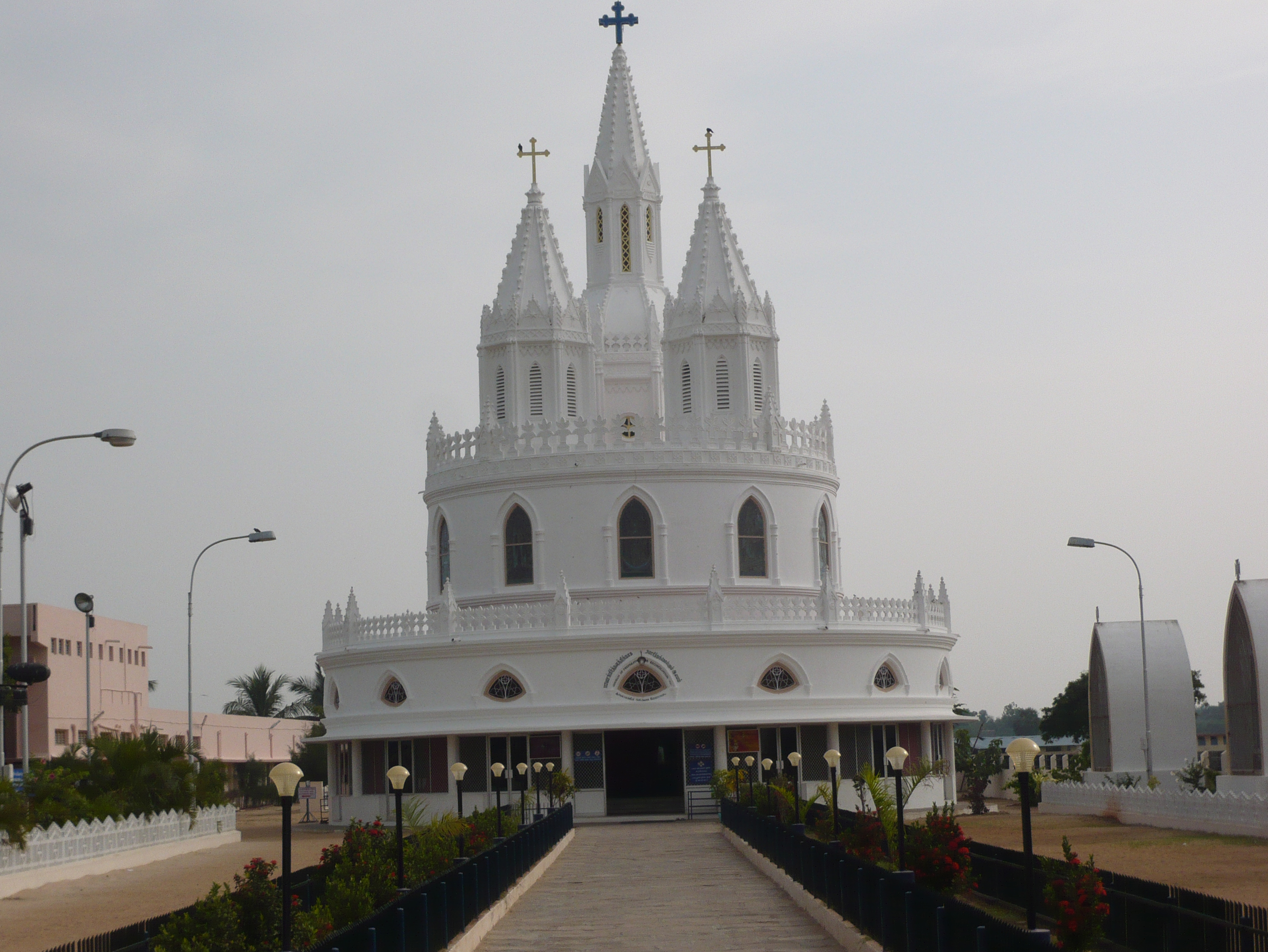
Veilankanni - Adoration Center

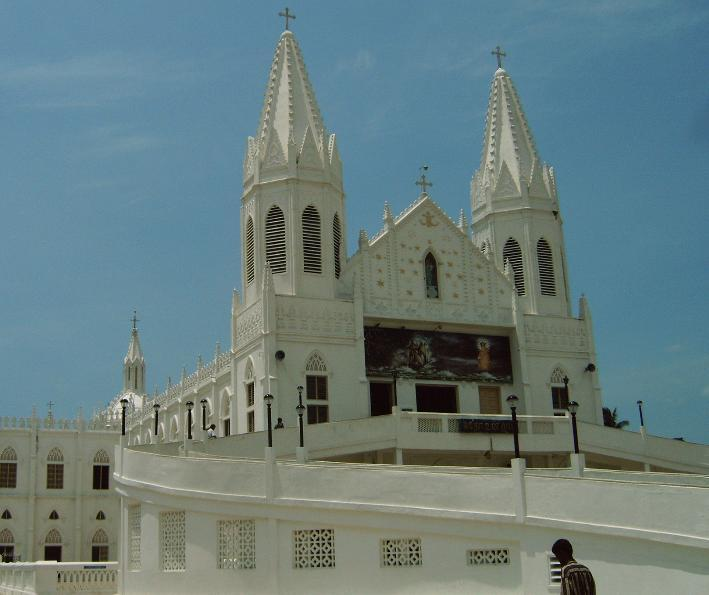
Velankanni Basilica

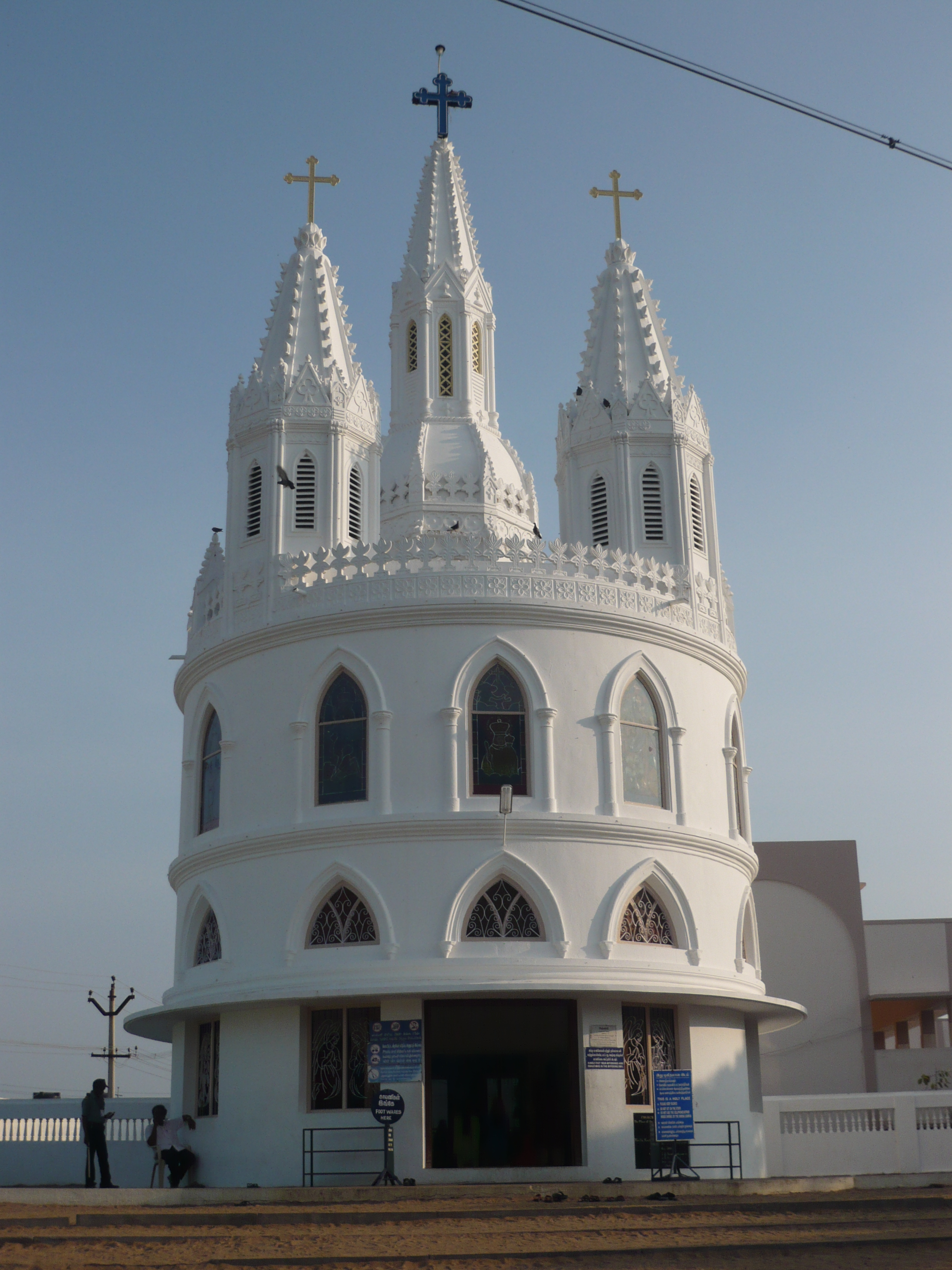
Chapel in Nadu Thittu where Mother Mary is said to have appeared for the first time

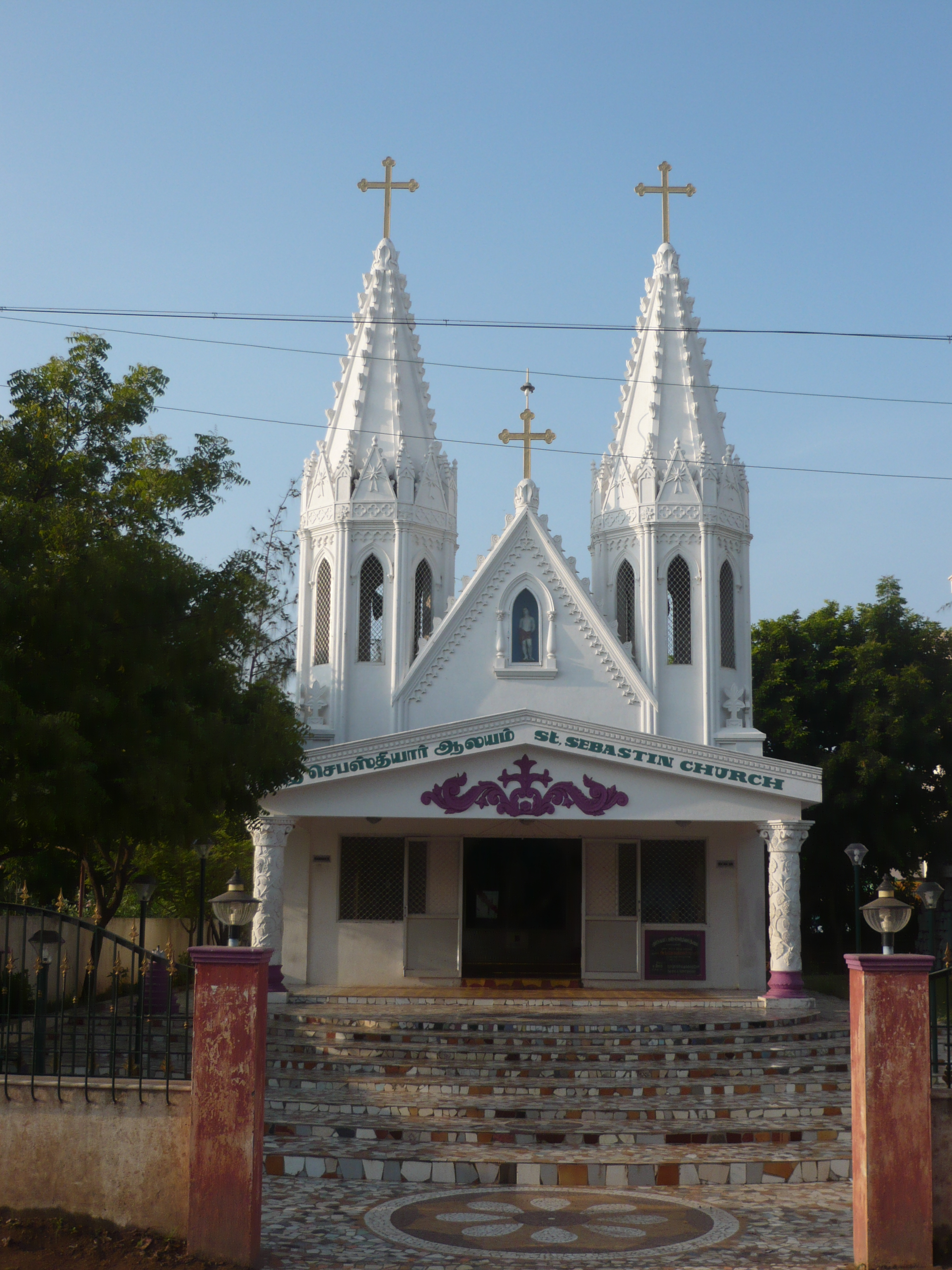
A Chapel for St. Sebastian at Velankanni

== Nuestra Señora de la Salud ==
There is a comparable devotion to Mary under the title Nuestra Señora de la Salud. In Pátzcuaro, in the Roman Catholic Archdiocese of Morelia the Basílica de Nuestra Señora de la Salud is named in her honor, as well as a church in San Miguel de Allende.

There is a shrine to "Nuestra Señora de la Salud" at San Nicolas de Tolentino Parish Church (Quezon City). The San Isidro Labrador Parish Church in Bambang, Bulakan, Bulacan was declared Our Lady of Good Health Marian Shrine. The miraculous 300 years old Mary, Help of the Sick - Salus Infirmorum icon was Episcopally crowned per Ordo Coronandi Imaginem Beatae Mariae Virginis included in the List of canonically crowned images by Bishop Dennis Villarojo with her votive crown on November 16, 2020.

In Venice she is celebrated on November 21 under the title Santa Maria della Salute.

== See also ==
- Catholic Church in India
- Velankanni Town
- Holy Infant of Good Health
