= National Shrine of Our Lady of La Leche =

Catholic shrine Florida, US

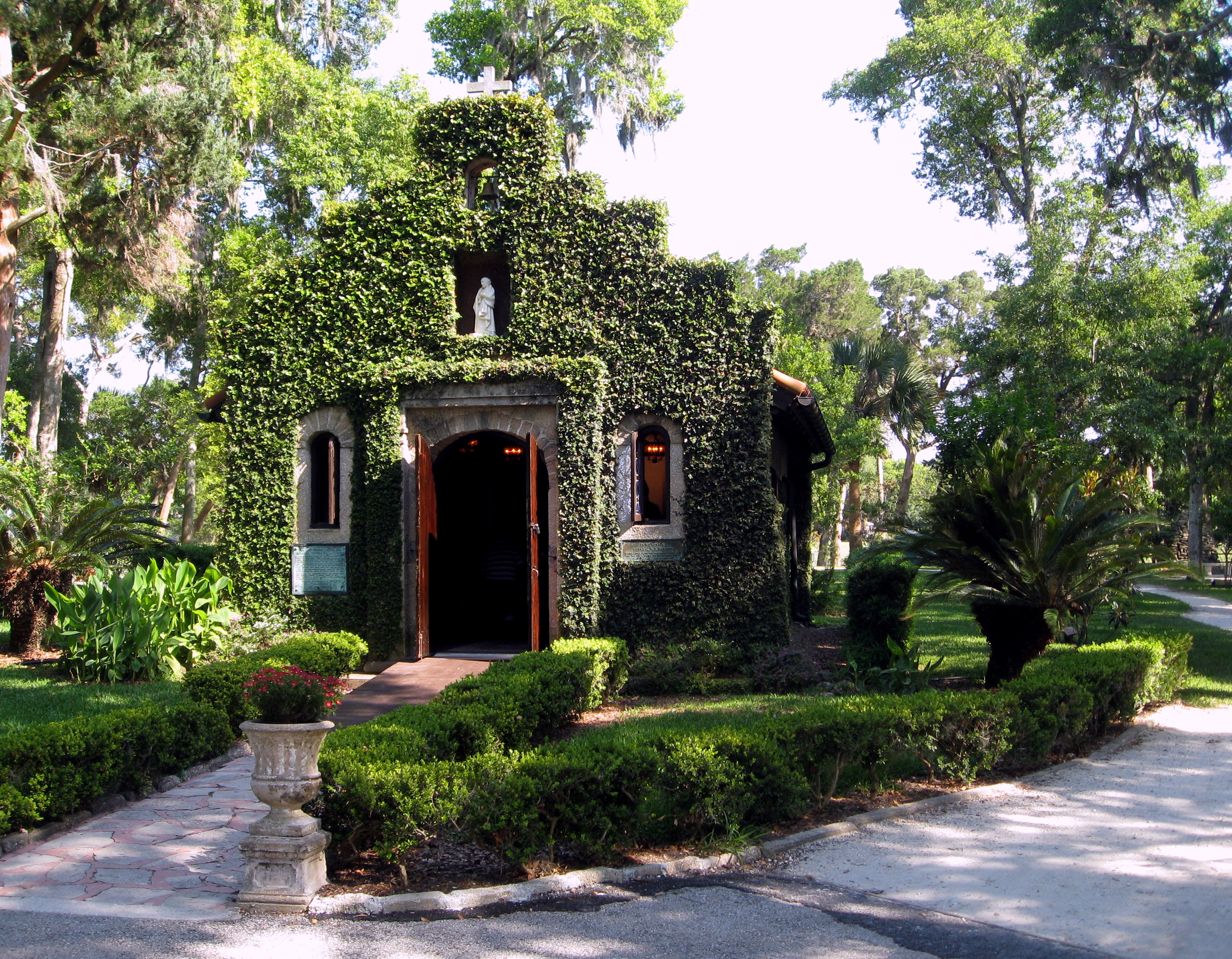

Religion
- Affiliation: Catholic
- Rite: Roman Rite
- Ecclesiastical or organisational status: National Shrine

Location
- Location: 101 San Marco Ave; St. Augustine, FL
- State: Florida
- Interactive map of National Shrine of Our Lady of La Leche
- Territory: Roman Catholic Diocese of St. Augustine
- Coordinates: 29°54′17″N 81°18′55″W

Architecture
- Completed: 1609

Website
- https://missionandshrine.org/

The National Shrine of Our Lady of La Leche is a Catholic Marian shrine located at the Nombre de Dios Mission in St. Augustine, Florida. Originally built in 1609 in honor of Our Lady of La Leche—a Marian apparition popular among the Spanish settlers in the area—it is the oldest shrine in the United States. It was elevated to national shrine status in 2019 and received a canonical coronation in 2021.

== History ==
=== Background ===
Spanish explorers, under the command of Pedro Menéndez de Avilés and the spiritual chaplaincy of Fr Francisco López de Mendoza Grajales, OFM, arrived in northern Florida in 1565. Grajalez celebrated there the first Mass in what would become the United States. The mission established there, Nombre de Dios, was also the first in that regard.

The settlers brought with them the Spanish devotion to Nuestra Señora de La Leche y Buen Parto ("Our Lady of the Milk and Good Delivery"). The name comes from the image of the Blessed Virgin Mary nursing the infant Jesus, hence the reference to "la leche"—i.e., (breast) milk.

=== Construction ===
The shrine was built in 1609 at the mission, in what was then Spanish Florida. The central feature of the shrine is a statue of the La Leche image.

The original shrine was burned with the mission in an English colonial invasion from Charleston in 1702, and destroyed in a British raid in 1728. It was rebuilt in 1875. The current chapel seats about 30 and was built in 1914.

=== National shrine status and coronation ===
The shrine was elevated to national shrine status by the United States Conference of Catholic Bishops (USCCB) in 2019, followed by the announcement of a canonical coronation ceremony due to take place in October 2020. It was authorized by a decree dated 24 January 2019.

The COVID-19 pandemic caused the rescheduling of the coronation to 10 October 2021.

== Significance ==
The newly manufactured image of Our Lady of La Leche which was granted a canonical coronation in 2021.

As one of the oldest Catholic worship sites in the Americas, the shrine holds a certain historical significance and is a popular pilgrimage site, especially for prayers concerning pregnancy.

Upon its coronation ceremony in October 2021, it became just the sixth-such Marian image in the United States.
