= Anai =

- Language: Japanese

Anai (穴井, 阿内) is a Japanese surname. Anai can also be a surname of English and Irish origins.

People with the Japanese surname include:

- Yuko Anai (穴井 夕子, born 1974), Japanese pop singer
- Takamasa Anai (穴井 隆将, born 1984), Japanese judoka
- Chihiro Anai (穴井 千尋, born 1996), Japanese pop singer, member of AKB48

== Given name ==
Anai is also a given name of multiple origins. From the Jamaican origin it means "beautiful", from the Indian (Sanskrit) origin it means "elephant", and from the Hebrew and Latin origin it means "God has favored me" or "grace". Anai can be a Spanish variation of Hannah.

== See also ==
- Annai (disambiguation)
