= Ordo Coronandi Imaginem Beatae Mariae Virginis =

The Ordo Coronandi Imaginem Beatæ Mariæ Virginis is a Pontifical book of instruction used within the Roman Catholic Church.

The ecclesiastical work gives the official instruction of how a venerated statue of the Virgin Mary should be crowned. The 1981 edition was approved by Pope John Paul II through the Congregation for Divine Worship and the Discipline of the Sacraments which authorizes exemplary Marian images that are approved for a canonical coronation.

The work is also considered as an important instruction and teaching in Mariology and the veneration of Mary. These instructions only can be performed by a bishop in name of the reigning pope, even if the papal bull of coronation was signed by a previously reigning pontiff. The instruction prescribes the materials that can be used for the crowns, often in high quality and appropriate sacred regalia.

== Bibliography ==
- Ordo coronandi imaginem beatae Mariae Virginis. Rituale romanum ex decreto Sacrosancti Oecumenici Concilii Vaticani II
