= Graha Maria Annai Velangkanni =

Coordinates: 3.5481°N 98.6086°E

Our Lady of Good Health Church புனித ஆரோக்கிய அன்னை வேளாங்கண்ணி தேவாலயம்
- Indonesian: Graha Maria Annai Velangkanni
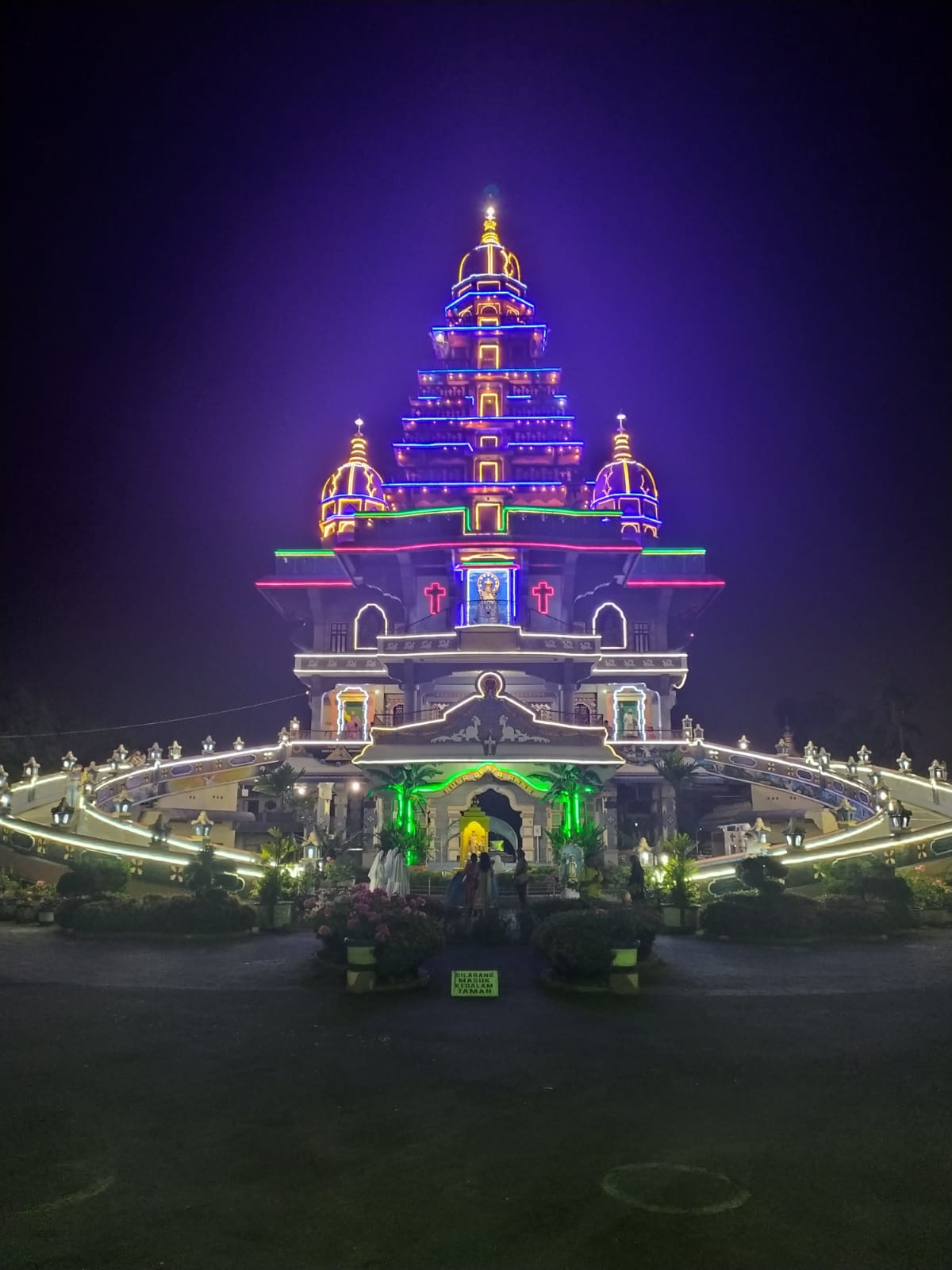
- Our Lady of Good Health Church புனித ஆரோக்கிய அன்னை வேளாங்கண்ணி தேவாலயம்
- Location: Medan
- Country: Indonesia
- Website: http://www.velangkanni.com

Architecture
- Years built: 2005

Our Lady of Good Health Church (Indonesian: Graha Maria Annai Velangkanni), is a Marian shrine built in an architectural synthesis of Dravidian, Indonesian, Chinese and local Batak styles, that opened in 2005 in Medan, Indonesia. It is devoted to Our Lady of Good Health (Tamil: ஆரோக்கிய மாதா or Ārōkkiya mātā, Indonesian: Bunda Maria dari Kesehatan yang Baik), a Marian apparition dating from the 17th century in the village of Velankanni on Southeastern India coast, in the present state of Tamil Nadu. The shrine is two floors high and has a small seven-floor tower in the Indonesian style. It is located on Jl. Sakura III, beside Jl. Simatupang. It is an important pilgrimage site in Asia.
