= Our Lady of Good Health Church, Pattumala =

Pattumala Matha Pilgrim Shrine
- Pattumala Matha Pilgrim Shrine
- Kochu Velankanni; Our Lady of Health Church, Pattumala
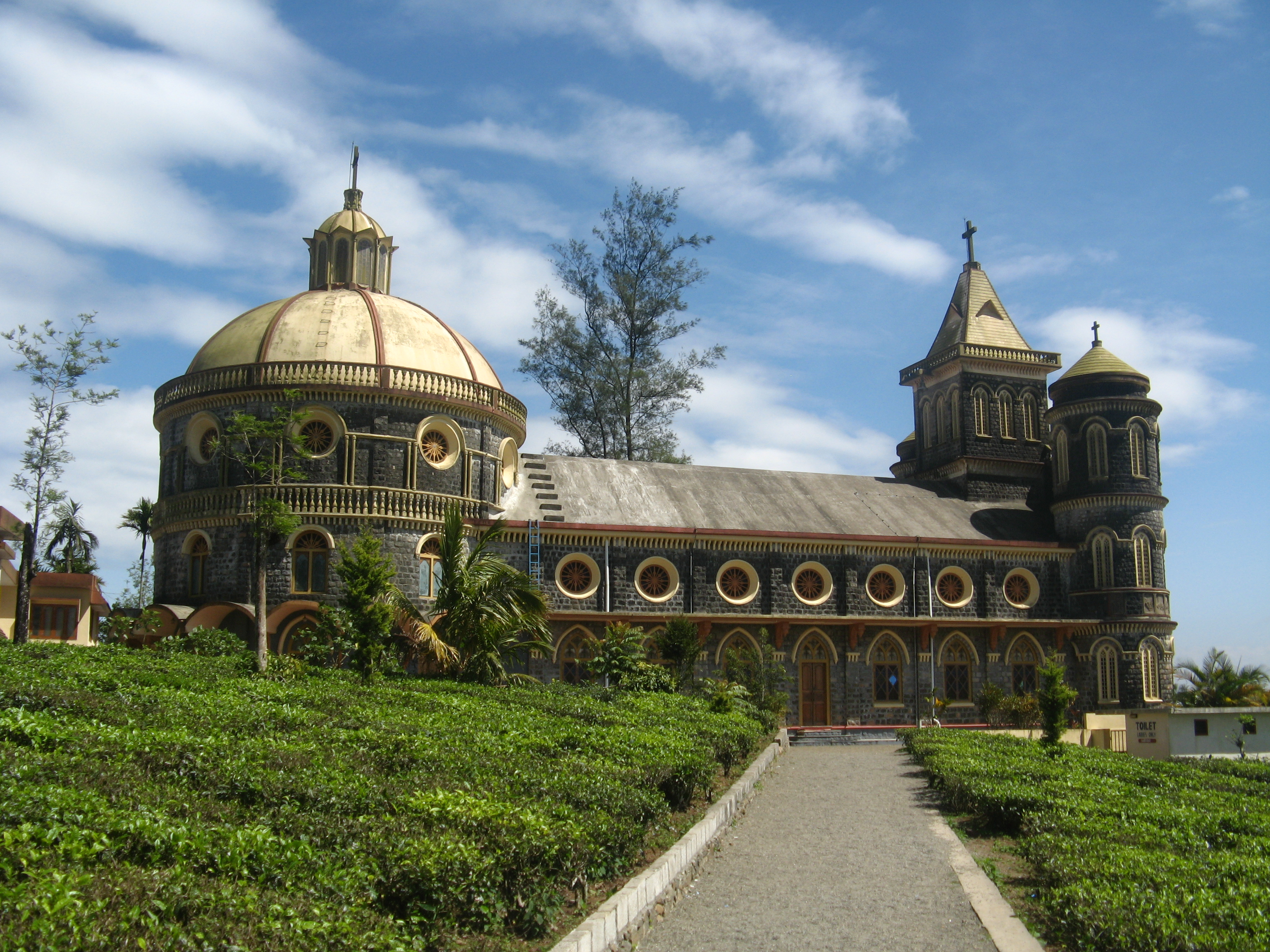
- Pattumala Matha Pilgrim Shrine

- Location within Kerala
- 9°34′44″N 77°02′04″E
- Location: Pattumala
- Country: India
- Denomination: Roman Catholic
- Religious order: Congregation of the Missionary Brothers of Saint Francis of Assisi
- Website: pattumalamatha.com

History
- Status: Parish church; Shrine
- Dedication: Our Lady of Good Health

Architecture
- Functional status: Active
- Architect: J. P. Bright
- Architectural type: Church
- Style: Gothic Revival
- Completed: 1998

Administration
- Archdiocese: Verapoly
- Diocese: Vijayapuram

Clergy
- Bishop: Most Rev. Sebastian Thekethecheril
- Abbot: Provincial Franciscan Brothers - Bro. Benny Appanchira CMSF

Pattumala Matha Church (Malayalam: പട്ടുമല മാതാ തീർത്ഥാടന കേന്ദ്രം, Tamil: பட்டுமலை மாதா புனித ஆலயம்) is a Roman Catholic Latin Rite pilgrim shrine in Kerala dedicated to Our Lady of Good Health. It is served by the Congregation of the Missionary Brothers of Saint Francis of Assisi (CMSF). This church has the largest dome among Christian churches in India.

== History ==
The church dates from the British era, when tea estate workers had a great devotion to Mother Mary. In the 1980s, Bro. Hippolitus Thadathil CMSF, a Franciscan missionary of Kerala, came to Pattumala and realised the devotion and took the initiative. At first, an ashram chapel was used by devotees for the prayers and then in the 1980s planned for a new church. The present church was blessed in 1998.

Architect J. P. Bright, Thiruvananthapuram, designed the church. The church is built entirely of granite and situated in the midst of tea plantations. The name Pattumala means "Hill Draped in Silk." It is located 8 kilometres (5.0 mi) from Peermade and 24 kilometres (15 mi) from Thekkady.

The church is designed in Gothic Revival style with a complete dome. The dome and roof of nave is pasted with beautifully designed slabs from inside.

At the entrance, main door frame is made of rock cut and there is rock cut portraits depicting various events in bible. The altar is of carved wood. All these add to the architectural excellence.

The church is believed to have two events of Marian Apparitions. Many miracles also have been attributed to the church.

Church is devoted to Mother Mary, in the name of Velankanni Matha and is known as Pattumala Matha as the name of place is. Also known as the "Kochu Velankanni Church"; declared as Pilgrim Centre by Pope John Paul II. Devotees and tourist visit the church very often.

== Gallery ==
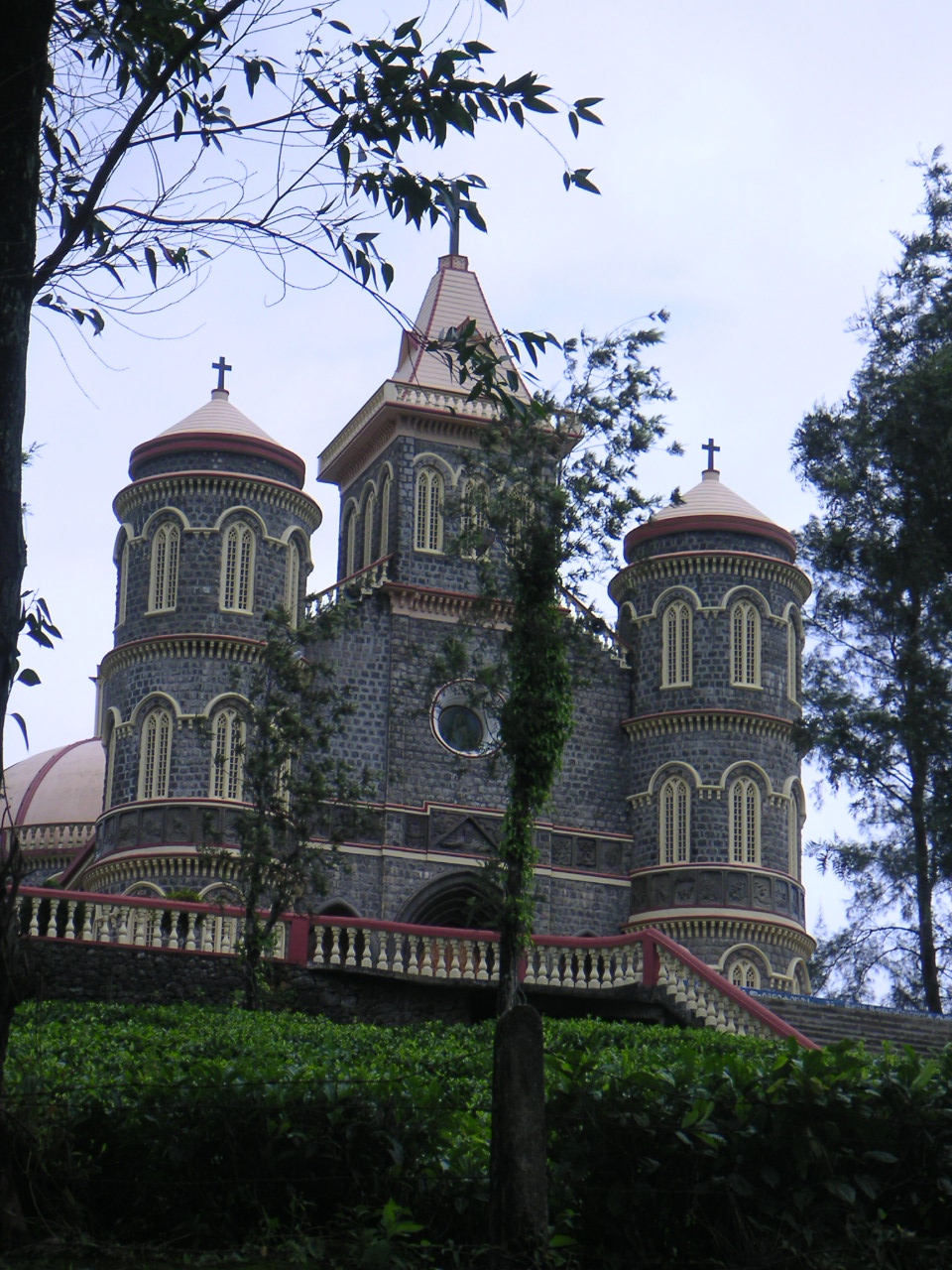

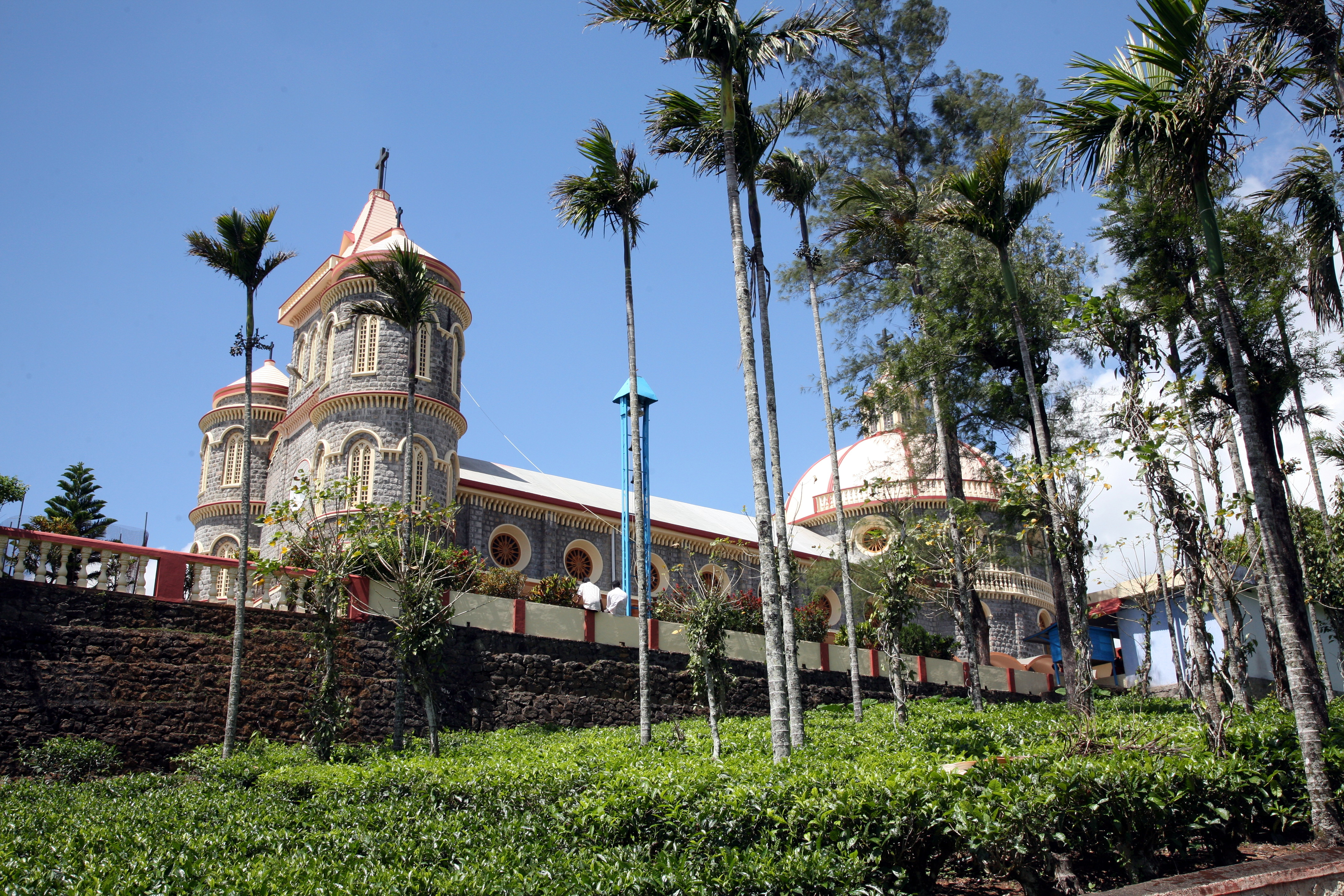

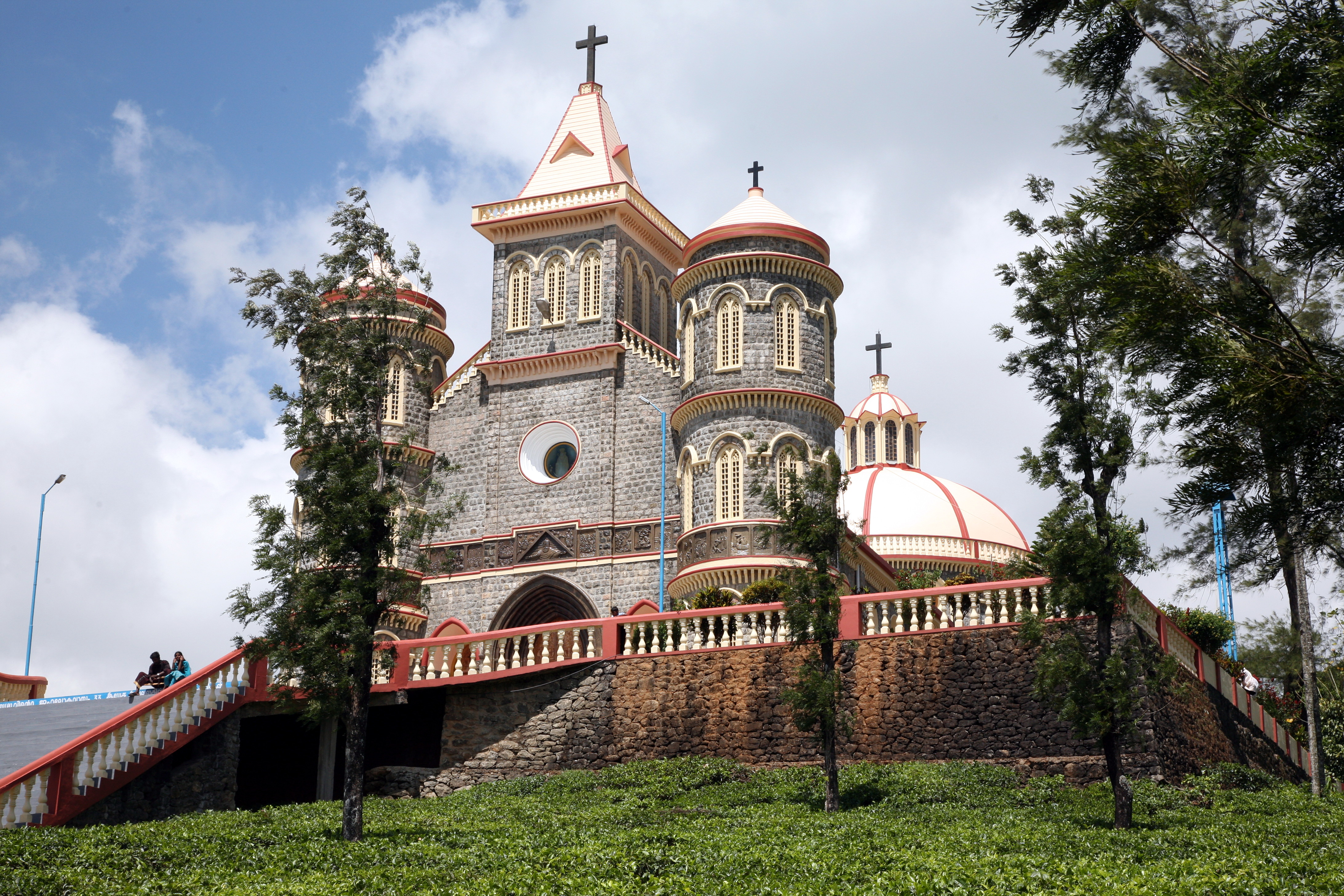

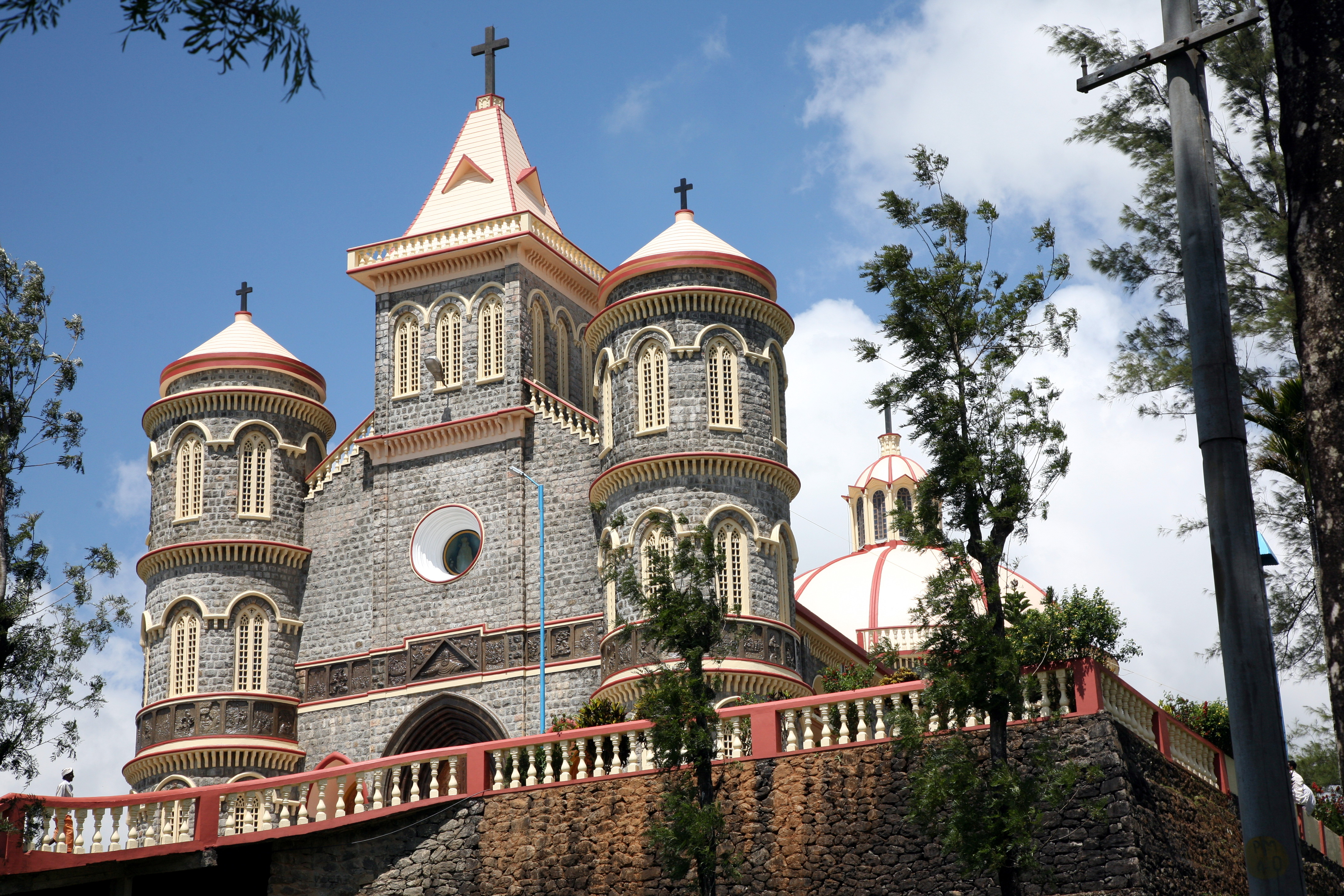
