= Annai Velankanni =

- Theatrical release poster
- Directed by: K. Thangappan
- Written by: Sham De Thomson
- Produced by: K. Thangappan
- Starring: Srividya; Sivakumar; Jayalalithaa; Gemini Ganesan; Padmini
- Cinematography: G. K. Ramu
- Edited by: N. M. Sankar
- Music by: G. Devarajan
- Production company: Giri Movies
- Release date: 15 August 1971
- Running time: 148 minutes
- Country: India
- Language: Tamil

Annai Velankanni (transl. Mother Velankanni) is a 1971 Indian Tamil-language film directed by K. Thangappan. The film stars Gemini Ganesan, Jayalalithaa, Padmini, and K. R. Vijaya. Kamal Haasan briefly appears in an uncredited role as Jesus Christ. It comprises three stories pertaining to Catholic beliefs.

== Premise ==
Velankanni, the film's setting, is a town in Nagapattinam district, Tamil Nadu, India. It is home to the Basilica of Our Lady of Good Health, built over sites where three Marian apparitions are believed to have taken place since the 16th century.

== Plot ==
Mary (Jayalalithaa) is a nurse in a hospital at Nagapattinam and is a devotee of the Mary, mother of Jesus who is believed to have appeared in Velankanni thrice in the past. While the nurse is away from the hospital meeting her love interest Susainathan (Gemini Ganesan), the Virgin Mary assumes the nurse's form and attends to her duties.

== Cast ==
- Srividya as Chellayee
- Sivakumar as Rangaiah
- Jayalalithaa as Nurse Mary
- Gemini Ganesan as Susainathan
- Padmini as Swarnam
- Master Sekhar as Raasa, Swarnam's son
- Major Sundarrajan as Sudararajan, Head Doctor
- K. R. Vijaya as Kamakshi
- R. Muthuraman as landlord
- Devika as Kannamma, landlord's wife
- Sachu as candle-selling woman
- Manorama as doll-selling Burmese woman
- S. V. Subbaiah as Father Francis
- Nagesh as Kannaiah
- Thengai Srinivasan as captain of a Portuguese India Armada
- Srikanth as Doctor Antony

Cameo appearances

- Kamal Haasan as Jesus Christ
- Baby Sumathi as patient
- S. Ramadoss as Karuppaiah, Chellayee's father
- S.R.Janaki as Velayee, Kamakshi's Neighbour
- I. S. R. as Thangaiah
- Gemini Balu as Mayandi
- Siva Sooriyan as villager
- A. Veerappan as villager
- Karikol Raju as villager
- G. Sakunthala as Annam
- S. Rama Rao as Sundaram
- V. R. Thilagam as Sundaram's wife
- Pushpamala in Cameo Appearance
- Master Prabhakar as Ayyakannu
- Suruli Rajan as Arunachalam, Village President
- Lakshmi Prabha as Susainathan's mother

== Production ==
Annai Velankanni was produced and directed by K. Thangappan under the company Giri Movies. The film dialogues were written by Sham De Thomson. The leading stars, including Jayalalithaa, worked without remuneration, as the film was a labor of love produced and directed by her dance guru and choreographer K. Thangappan. The cast waived their acting fees out of respect for Thangappan. Kamal Haasan worked as the assistant director of the film and appeared in a cameo as Jesus Christ in the film. Srividya and Sivakumar paired first time in this movie.

== Release and reception ==
Annai Velankanni was released on 15 August 1971. The film was dubbed Telugu-language as Mary Matha and released on 25 December 1971. The film was later dubbed into Malayalam-language as Velankanni Mathavu released on 27 May 1977. Historian B. Vijayakumar Stated in an article that the Tamil and Malayalam-dubbed versions were box office hits. Both versions were box office hits in Kerala.

== Soundtrack ==
The music was composed by G. Devarajan, while the lyrics were written by Kannadasan, Vaali and Ayyasamy.

| Song | Singers | Length |
|---|---|---|
| "Devamaindhan Pogindran" | T. M. Soundararajan | 03:23 |
| "Kadal Alai Thaalaattum" | P. Madhuri | 04:01 |
| "Karunai Kadale" | P. Susheela | 03:40 |
| "Karunai Mazhaiyae" | P. Susheela | 03:39 |
| "Neelakkadalin Oratthil" | T. M. Soundararajan, P. Madhuri | 03:22 |
| "Pera Orani" | T. M. Soundararajan, P. Madhuri | 06:39 |
| "Thandhana Thaana" | K. J. Yesudas, P. Madhuri | 06:01 |
| "Vaanamennum Veedhiyile" | K. J. Yesudas, P. Madhuri | 03:12 |

== Accolades ==
Annai Velankanni won the Chennai Film Fans' Association Award for Best Popular Film and Sekar won for Best Child Star.
