= Holy Infant of Good Health =

Statue regarded as miraculous

Holy Infant of Good Health "Santo Niño de la Salud"
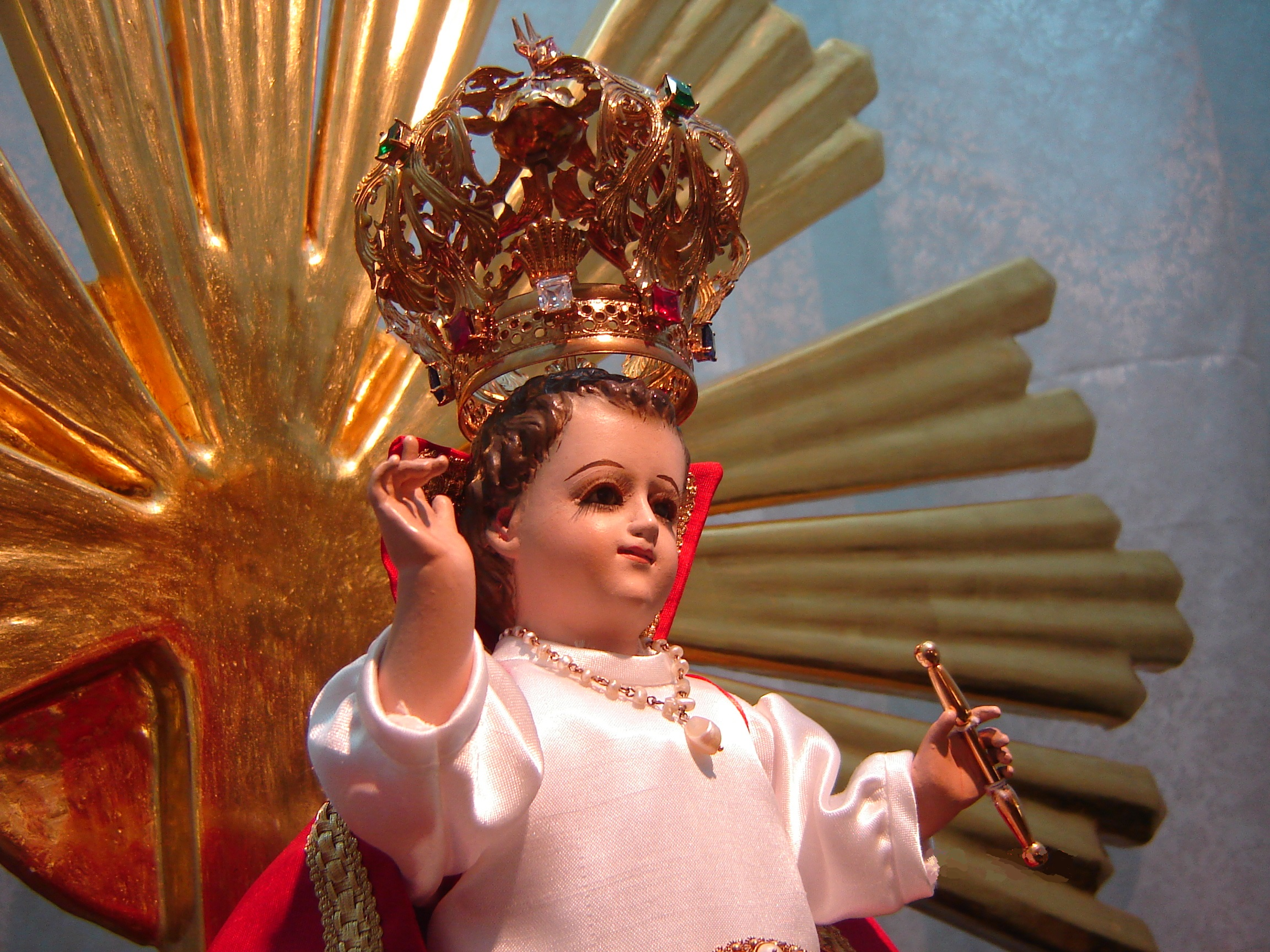
- Location: Morelia, Mexico
- Type: Christ statue
- Shrine: Holy Infant of Good Health Shrine, Mississippi
- Patronage: Sick people, protection from disease
- Attributes: Statue of the Child Jesus, white robe, red embroidered ermine mantle, coronation crown, gold scepter

The Holy Infant of Good Health (Spanish: Santo Niño de la Salud) is a statue of the Christ Child regarded by many as miraculous. It was found in 1939 in Morelia, Michoacán State, Mexico. The statue is eleven inches tall. A number of healings have been attributed to Child Jesus through veneration of this image.

== History ==
Devotion to the Holy Infant began in 1939, when Rosa María Guadalupe Calderón was given the statue by her godmother, María de Jesús Magana, who had a small store attached to her home in Morelia. Shortly afterwards, cures were attributed to the Holy Child.

On April 21, 1942, the image of the Holy Infant was placed in Saint Augustine Church in Morelia and officially blessed and given the title of the Santo Niño de la Salud ("Holy Infant of Good Health"). Many came to know the Holy Infant under this title and the devotion spread throughout Mexico. People from Laredo, Texas, and other parts of the United States also became aware of this devotion. On December 15, 1957, the statue was transferred to the Church of Our Lady of Mount Carmel.

In January 1959, a replica of the Holy Infant was presented to Pope John XXIII. On September 9, 1966, an order of religious sisters, the Missionaries of the Holy Infant of Good Health, was founded in Morelia. Among devotions attached to this title is a chaplet.

The little statue is dressed "with symbols of the power of Christ, wearing a royal mantle, trimmed in ermine, a golden scepter in the left hand while the right is raised in blessing, and on the head an imperial crown of precious stones." The feast day of the Holy Infant of Good Health is celebrated on April 21, the anniversary of the image receiving its title.

== See also ==
- List of statues of Jesus

== Bibliography ==
- Cruz, Joan Carroll. Miraculous Images of Our Lord, TAN Books and Publishers, Inc, 1995. ISBN 0-89555-496-8
- Holy Infant Jesus, by Ann Ball & Damian Hinojosa, The Crossroad Publishing Company, 2006. ISBN 0-8245-2407-1
