= Canonical coronation =

Ceremonial crowning of an image of Christ or His saints

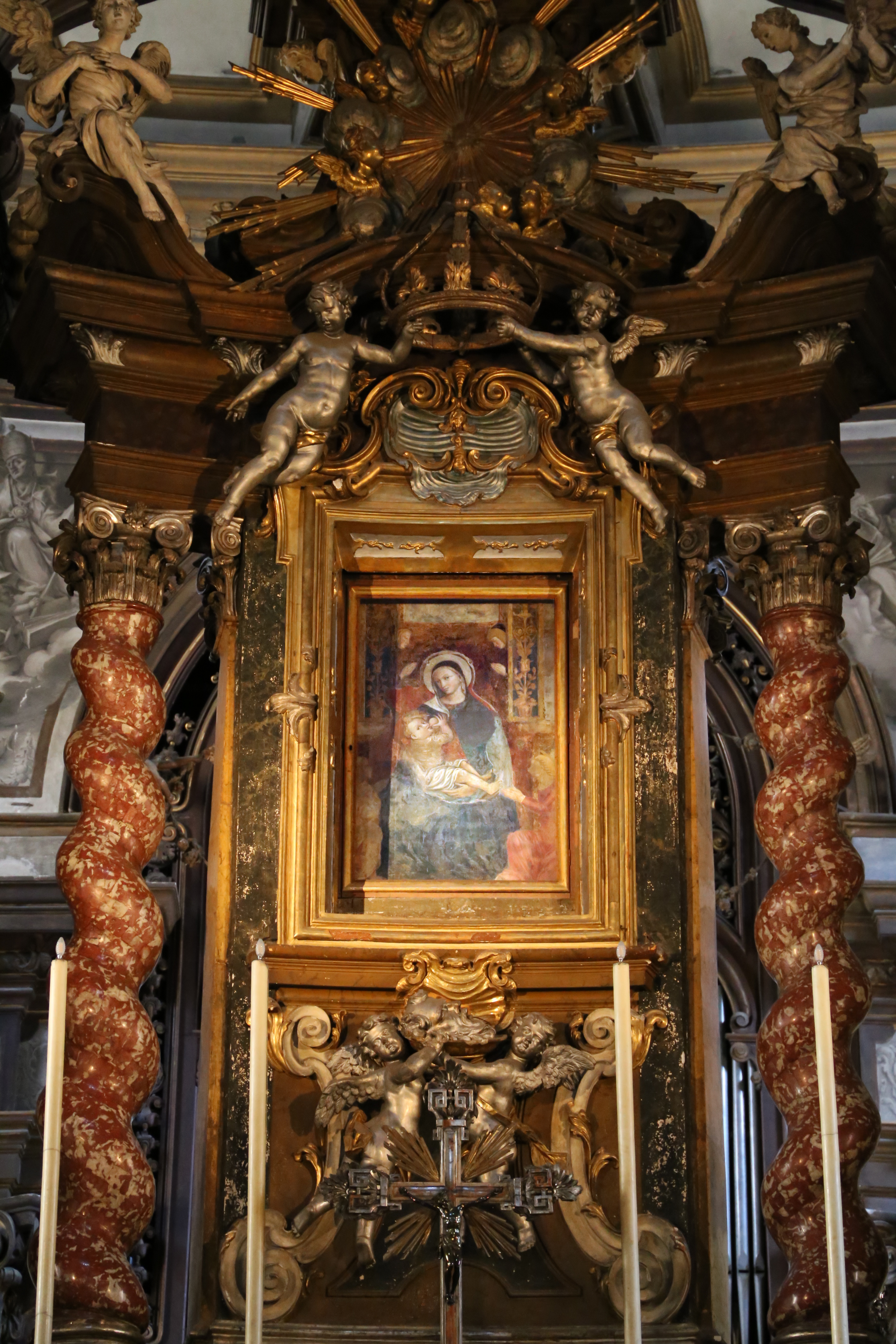
The Nursing Madonna of Sanctuary of Santa Maria della Steccata, an early coronation by friar Jeronimo (Girolamo) Paolucci di Calboldi di Forli on 27 May 1601

A canonical coronation (Latin: Coronatio Canonica) is a pious institutional act of the pope, duly expressed in a formal decree of a papal bull, in which the pope bestows the pontifical right to impose an ornamental crown, a diadem or an aureole to an image of Christ, Mary or Joseph that is widely venerated in a particular diocese or locality. The act was later regulated to Marian images only, through the Sacred Congregation of Rites' instruction, De coronatione imaginum B.V. Mariae, issued on 25 March 1973.

The formal act is generally carried out by a representing proxy of the pope, via the designated apostolic nuncio to a country or kingdom, or at times a lesser papal legate, or on rare occasions by the pope himself, by ceremonially attaching a crown, tiara, or stellar halo to the devotional image or statue.

The Holy Office originally issued the authorisation of a canonical coronation through a dicastery, called the "Vatican Chapter". Subsequently, until 1989, the Vatican's Sacred Congregation of Rites was assigned this duty. Since then, the Congregation for Divine Worship and the Discipline of the Sacraments makes the formal consultation and arrangement to execute the ceremonial act which the decree authorizes.

== History ==
The formal act of coronation towards Marian images began with the Order of Friars Minor Capuchins, who on their evangelising missions collected great quantities of jewellery associated with the practice of indulgences, which funded at the request of the faithful, the gold crowns or accessories for images of the Blessed Virgin Mary, mainly in Italy. Although the crowning of statues and paintings occurred occasionally in antiquity and the Middle Ages, the early modern practice of the canonical coronation began with the Capuchin friar and "Apostle of the Blessed Lady", Girolamo Paolucci di Calboldi di Forlì (1552–1620), who on 27 May 1601 crowned the Madonna now enshrined at the Sanctuary of Santa Maria della Steccata in Parma, Italy.

When the Marquis of Piacenza and Count of Borgonovo, Alessandro Sforza Cesarini died in 1636, he bequeathed in his will a large sum of money to the Vatican Chapter for the coronation of the most celebrated Marian images in the world. Funds from his bequest went towards the restoration of the Madonna della Febbre, which is now enshrined in the sacristy of Saint Peter's Basilica in Rome.

== Development of the rite ==
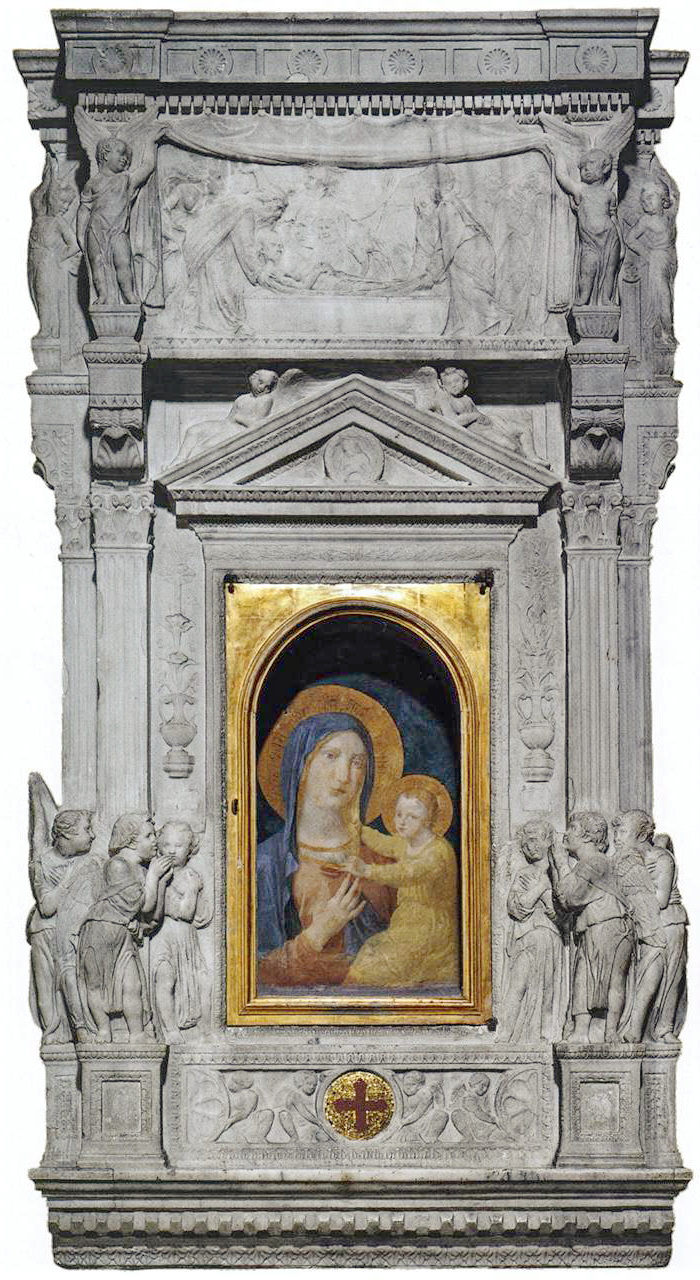
The famed Madonna della Febbre, first to be canonically crowned by Pope Urban VIII on 27 May 1631. The surrounding marble frame is a ciborium by Donatello di Niccolò di Betto Bardi — The Sacristy of Saint Peter's Basilica, Rome.

The enactment of the rite of the coronation of a venerated image became widely popular in the Papal States prior to 1800, when approximately 300 coronation ceremonies were performed. On 29 March 1897, an official rite titled Ordo Servandus in Tradendis Coronis Aureis Quæ Donantur a Reverendisimi Capitulo Sancti Petri de Urbe Sacris imaginibus Beatæ Mariæ Virginis was included in the Roman Pontifical, for which a plenary indulgence was also conceded to the faithful who participated in such rites.

- The first Marian image ceremoniously crowned without direct papal approbation was performed by Cardinal Orazio Spinola for the Madonna of the Vineyards venerated at the Basilica of Santa Maria delle Vigne in Genoa on 5 April 1616. Pope Benedict XV later granted a decree of coronation titled Quae Civitatis Istius on 1 November 1920, signed and executed by the Archbishop of Genoa, Cardinal Tommaso Pio Boggiani in honor of the Pope's native birthplace.
- The first image of the Blessed Virgin Mary that was pontifically crowned was Lippo Memmi's painting of La Madonna della Febbre in the sacristy of Saint Peter's Basilica in Rome on 27 May 1631, by Pope Urban VIII through the Vatican Chapter.
- The first Marian image pontifically crowned outside of Rome was the Our Lady of Trsat of Croatia on 8 September 1715 by Pope Clement XI.
- The first Marian image personally crowned by a pope himself was the Madonna del Popolo on 3 June 1782 by Pope Pius VI at the Cesena Cathedral.
- The first image of Christ granted a decree of canonical coronation was granted by Pope Leo XII for the Infant Jesus of Prague on 24 September 1824. The image is now enshrined at the Carmelite Church of Our Lady of Victories in Prague, Czech Republic.
- The first image of Saint Joseph that granted a decree of canonical coronation by Pope Pius VI was for the Sanctuary of Saint Joseph in Kalisz, Poland on 15 May 1796. Pope John XXIII gifted the venerated image his personal ring, accompanied with an "epistle of consecration" in 1963. Accordingly, its paired Madonna and Child ensemble merited their own separate pontifical decrees in 1984 under the auspices of Pope John Paul II.

== Enshrinement of the rite ==
An earlier reference to the coronation of Marian images is decreed in the 1973 apostolic brief Pluries Decursu Temporis. The solemn rite of crowning images is contained in the Ordo Coronandi Imaginem Beatae Mariae Virginis, published by the Holy Office on 25 May 1981. Prior to 1989, papal bulls authorising canonical coronations were inscribed manually on parchment. After 1989, the Dicastery for Divine Worship and the Discipline of the Sacraments began issuing the authorisations, thereby authorising a papal legate to perform the coronation of the approved devotional image on behalf of the pope via an expressed decree of letters patent.
