= Batra =

Batra (Punjabi: ਬੱਤਰਾ) is a clan of the Arora community of Punjab, India. They are mainly followers of Hinduism and Sikhism.

== Notable people ==
=== Armed Forces ===
- Vikram Batra, PVC (1974–1999), officer of the Indian Army, posthumously awarded India's highest award for valour

=== Athletics ===
- Manika Batra (born 1995), Indian table tennis player, Commonwealth Games gold medalist
- Namrata Batra (born 2000), Indian wushu player
- Narinder Dhruv Batra (born 1957), Indian sports administrator

=== Bollywood ===
- Pankaj Batra, Indian director
- Pooja Batra (born 1975), Indian actress who was Miss India International in 1993
- Rajan Batra, Indian producer
- Rani Batra, known by her stage name Pallavi, Indian actress
- Ritesh Batra (born 1979), Indianector
- Saloni Batra (born 1987), Indian actress
- Sanjay Batra, television actor in India
- Shakun Batra (born 1983), Indian film director. He directed Ek Main Aur Ekk Tu, Kapoor & Sons and Gehraiyaan
- Vicky Batra, Indian actor

=== Creatives ===
- Adrienne Batra (born 1973), Indian-Canadian journalist and editor-in-chief of the Toronto Sun
- Aseem Batra, American TV director, actress, producer and writer of Scrubs
- David Batra (born 1972), Swedish-Indian stand-up comedian and TV actor
- Vibha Batra, Indian author, advertising consultant, poet, lyricist, translator, travel writer, playwright, and columnist

=== Politics ===
- Anna Kinberg Batra (born 1970), Swedish politician, leader of the Moderate Party 2015–2017
- Bharat Bhushan Batra (born 1952), Indian politician serving as the MLA of Rohtak
- Dinanath Batra (1930–2024), Indian educator and former general secretary of Vidya Bharati, the school network run by the RSS
- Pradip Batra, Indian BJP politician and member of the Uttarakhand Legislative Assembly from the Roorkee constituency
- Shadi Lal Batra (born 1940), Indian politician

=== Religious Leaders ===
- Balak Singh Batra, Sikh religious leader who founded Namdhari (Kuka) sect

=== Science and engineering ===
- Akshay Batra, Indian entrepreneur and trichologist
- Anuj Batra, American researcher and electrical engineer specializing in ultrawideband wireless technology. He was included in Innovators Under 35 "TR35" list
- Harsh Vardhan Batra (born 1955), Indian scientist working in animal biotechnology in Indian Ministry of Science and Technology
- Lekh Raj Batra (1929–1999), distinguished Indian-American mycologist
- Mukesh Batra (born 1951), Indian homeopathy practitioner, and Founder of Dr. Batra's Healthcare
- Rajeev Batra, American marketing scholar, professor and author
- Ravi Batra (born 1943), Indian-American economist, author, and professor at Southern Methodist University
- Romesh Batra, professor in the Department of Engineering Science and Mechanics at Virginia Tech
- Suzanne Batra (born 1937), American entomologist
