= Udayar (caste) =

Title in Indian caste system

- Religions: Hinduism, Christianity
- Languages: Tamil
- Country: India
- Populated states: Tamil Nadu
- Related groups: Tamil people

The Udayar is a title used by multiple caste in the state of Tamil Nadu, India.

== Present status ==
The Udayar, together with the Pallar and Kallar, form the Marava castes, which predominate in the region variously known as Ramnad and the Maravar country.

== Religion ==
In Ramnad and the nearby areas of Pudukottai, Madurai, Salem, Namakkal, Tanjore and Trichy, they and their two fellow Maravar caste groups are prominent in their cult worship of the shrine at Oriyur that commemorates John de Britto, a 17th-century Portuguese Jesuit missionary and martyr. Raj says, "A notable feature of the Britto cult is that it is centered around caste identities rather than religious affiliation", and thus members of the caste-group, irrespective of their religious affiliation regard Britto as their clan-deity.

Some Udayars are Roman Catholic Christians.

== Notable people ==
- Channaiah Odeyar (died 2007), Indian politician
- N. Karupanna Odayar, Indian politician
- N. P. V. Ramasamy Udayar (1936–1998), Indian industrialist
- T. S. Swaminatha Odayar, Indian politician
- A. T. Pannirselvam , Indian attorney and political leader.
