= St. John de Britto Church =

'John de Britto Church, or similarly named Christian churches with the saint John de Britto, may refer to:

== India ==
=== Karnataka ===
- St John de Britto Church, Laggere, Bengaluru

=== Tamil Nadu ===
- St. John de Britto Shrine, Oriyur, Ramanathapuram
- St. John de Britto Church, Sesurajapuram, Krishnagiri District
- St. John de Britto Church, Subramaniapuram, Trichy
- St. John de Britto Church, R.S.Puram, Coimbatore

St. John De Britto's Church, Sakthikulangara, Kollam, Kerala.

== See also ==
- John de Britto
- St. John de Britto College
