= Sacred Heart Shrine, Idaikattur =

Sacred Heart Shrine
- Sacred Heart Church
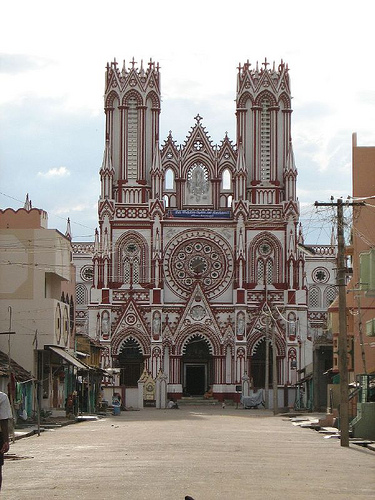

- Location within Tamil Nadu
- 9.7611839°N 78.3880374°E
- Location: Idaikattur
- Country: India
- Denomination: Catholic

History
- Status: Shrine

Architecture
- Functional status: Active
- Architectural type: Gothic

Administration
- Diocese: Sivagangai

The Sacred Heart Shrine is a Catholic church in Idaikattur in Tamil Nadu. It is noted for being a replica of Reims Cathedral in France.

== History ==
In 1866, a thatched shed was constructed, which functioned as St. James church for Idaikattur parish. Fr. Ferdinandus Celle, SJ, the parish priest travelled to France in 1886 to gather funds for the construction of a church building. An Anglican woman named Mary Anne who was suffering from an acute heart ailment received a miraculous cure after praying a Catholic novena to the Sacred Heart of Jesus. Mary Anne donated 2000 francs to Fr. Celle for the construction, with the request that the new church would be dedicated to the Sacred Heart Church and that it would be a replica of the Rheims Cathedral.

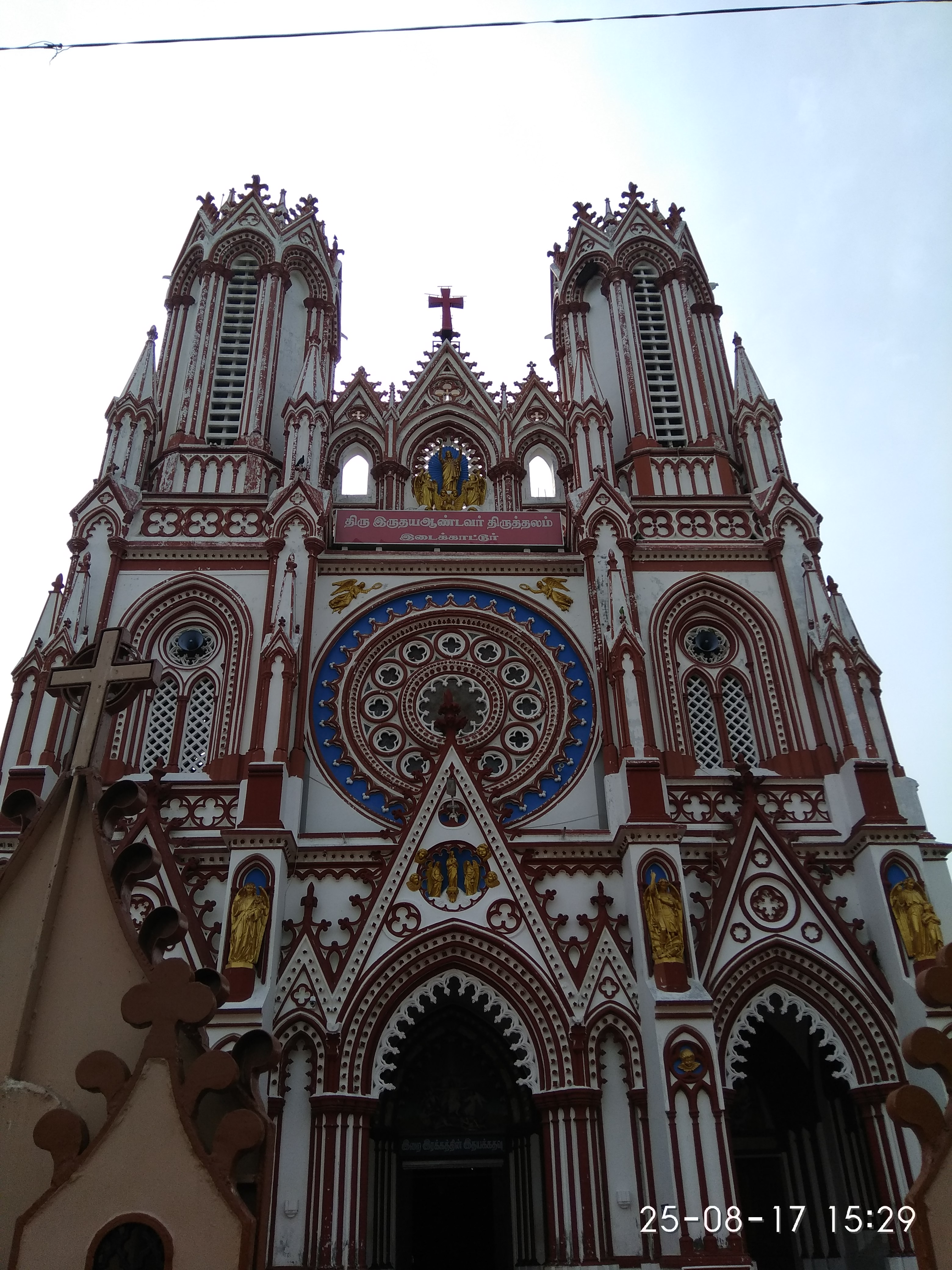
idaikattur Sacred Heart Shrine

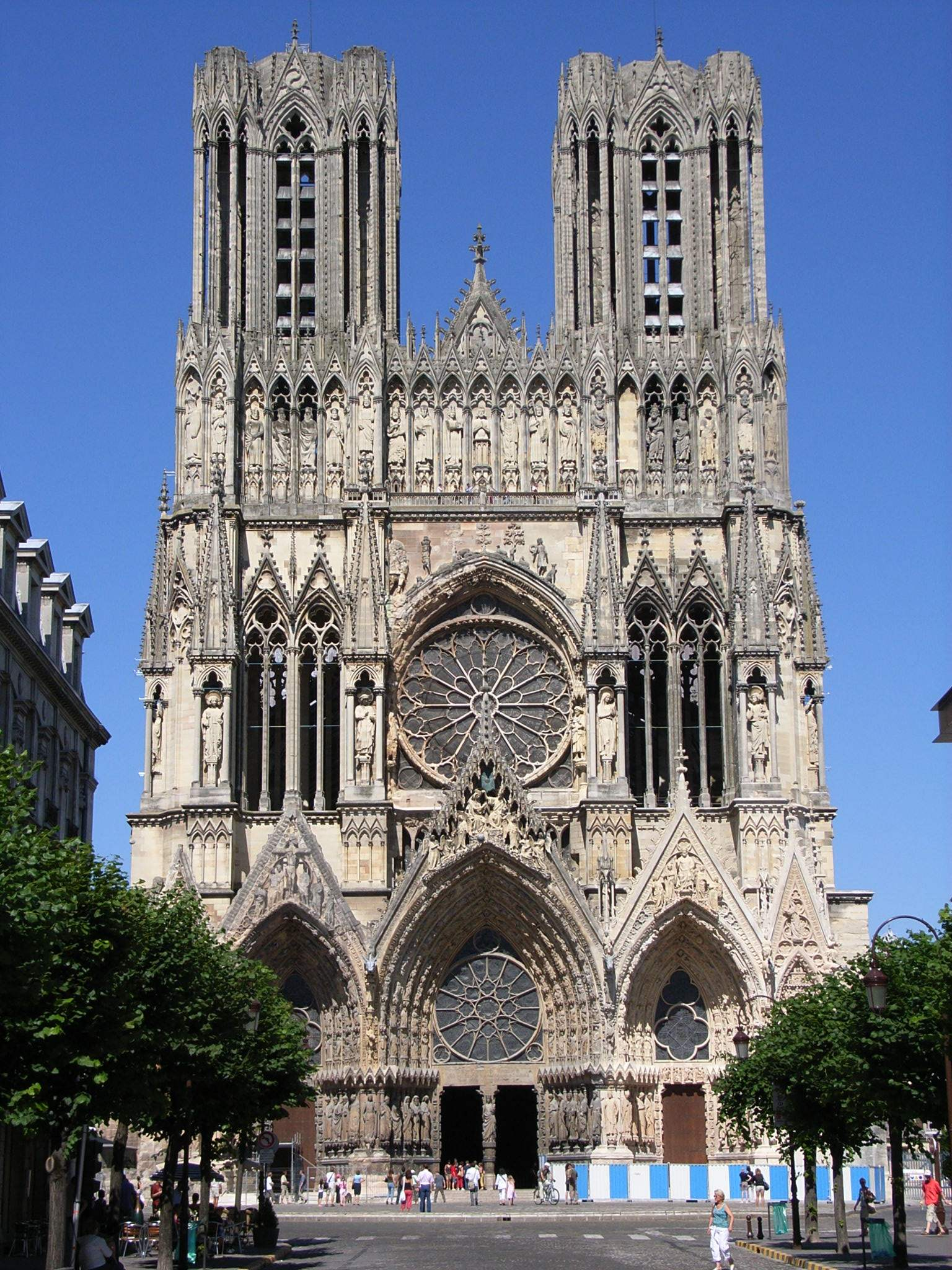
Rheims Cathedral in France

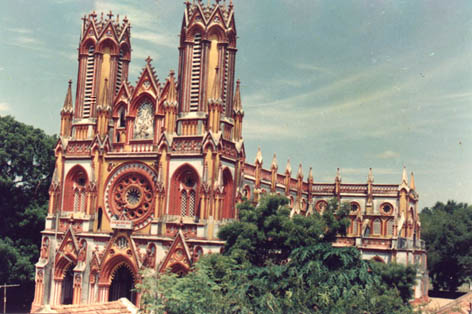

During the church construction, a portion of the church on the northern side was unintentionally built on a piece of land belonging to the temple. Fr. Celle offered to purchase the land, but the villagers refused. A commission was dispatched from Madras to Idaikattur to adjudicate the matter. On the night before leaving Madras, the head of the commission had a dream in which he saw angels building a church. On reaching Idaikattur, he was surprised to see that the church was the same one that he had seen in his dream. The head of the commission told the villagers about the dream. The villagers not only relinquished the piece of land, but even donated more land for the construction of the church.

== Architecture ==
The church is in the Gothic style with a vaulted roof supported by columns with cantilever beams. These columns are connected to a circular terracotta ring which is shaped into rows of garlands, flowers, beads, etc. It was constructed by local masons who used a model of the Rheims Cathedral as a reference. In commemoration of the dream of the commission head, Fr. Celle placed statues and paintings of 153 angels in and around the church walls. The tomb of Fr. Ferdinandus Celle stands on the right side of the altar. Hollow bricks were used in the construction of the church, which helps keep the interior cool.
