= Arul Anandar College, Karumathur =

Arts and science collage in Karumathur, Madudai

Arul Anandar College
- "Filled with Grace"
- Motto: Work, Justice, & Love
- Type: Autonomous
- Established: 1970; 56 years ago
- Affiliations: Madurai Kamaraj University
- Religious affiliation: Jesuit (Roman Catholic)
- Rector: Rev. Dr. John Pragasam SJ
- Principal: Rev. Dr. Anbarasu M SJ
- Location: Karumathur, Madurai, Tamil Nadu, India; 9°56′05″N 77°56′05″E
- Campus: rural
- Website: aactni.edu.in
- Location in Tamil Nadu, India

Arul Anandar College (AAC) is an arts and sciences autonomous college affiliated to Madurai Kamaraj University, situated at Karumathur, Madurai, and administered by the Jesuits. The College name, meaning "filled with grace", refers to John de Britto, the Jesuit saint martyred at Orur (sometimes spelled Oriyur), Tamil Nadu, India.

== History ==
The College was founded in 1970 as De La Salle College by the late Most Rev. Dr. Justin Diraviam, Catholic Archbishop in Madurai, with a pre-degree course and undergraduate courses in economics and philosophy. In 1972 it was renamed as Arul Anandar College and became a Jesuit institution. The college received autonomous status in 1987, and National Assessment and Accreditation Council (NAAC) 5 Start Rating in 2001. In 2014 AAC received an "A" grade from the NAAC.

In 1975 Mother Teresa, founder of the Missionaries of Charity, visited the campus. The Alumni Association was inaugurated in 1987. Doctoral programmes in rural development science and economics began in 2001. In 2009 Britto Publishing House was established. After that, an indoor stadium & gymnasium was constructed, a bio-gas plant and model poultry and piggery farm were established, and a student gym was added.

== Aims & objectives ==
From it rural setting, AAC aims to offer educational opportunities for the weaker sections of society‚ particularly the MBC and the Scheduled Castes‚ who form the majority of its student population. To further empower women, ACC began admitting women at the undergraduate level in 2001 onwards and in 2005 a women's hostel was established.

== Degrees ==
The Bachelor of Arts degree (B.A.) is conferred in history, economics, and philosophy, and there is a Bachelor of Science (B.Sc.) in mathematics, physics, chemistry, rural development science, food science & technology, computer science, information technology & management, and physical education. Also there are the Bachelor of Business Administration (B.B.A.) and Bachelor of Commerce (B.Com.) Post graduate degrees conferred are Master of Arts (M.A.) in economics and philosophy, the Master of Science (M.Sc.) in mathematics, physics, chemistry and dairy science and rural management, and the Masters in Computer Application (M.C.A.) There are also research degrees offered, the M.Phil. in economics and the Ph.D. in economics, physics, and rural development science.

== See also ==
- List of Jesuit sites
