= Campion School, Mumbai =

Private Catholic school in Mumbai, India

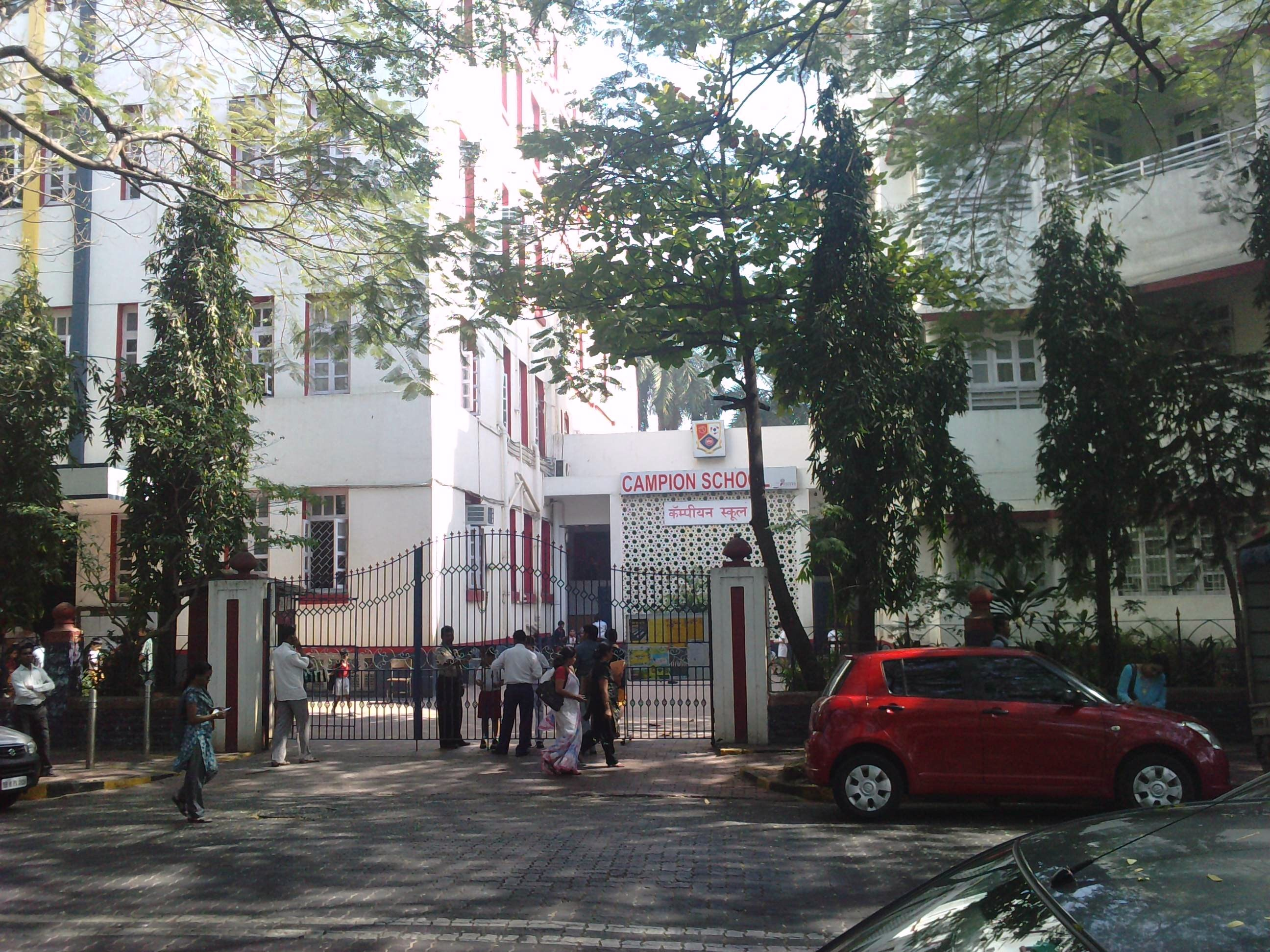

Location
- 13 Cooperage Road; Fort; Mumbai, Maharashtra 400001; India
- 18°55′29″N 72°49′48″E

Information
- Type: Private primary and secondary school
- Motto: Latin: Gaudium in Veritate (Joy in Truth)
- Religious affiliation: Catholicism
- Denomination: Jesuits
- Patron saint: Edmund Campion
- Established: 20 January 1943; 83 years ago
- Principal: Ms. Sarah Thomas
- Staff: 35
- Faculty: 50
- Grades: K-10
- Gender: Boys
- Enrollment: 800
- Language: English
- Houses: Britto; Loyola; Xavier; Berchmans
- Sports: Soccer, basketball, athletics, cricket
- Publication: The Campion Review
- Affiliation: Indian Certificate of Secondary Education and International General Certificate of Secondary Education
- Alumni: Old Campionites
- Anthem: Campion Calls
- Website: campionschool.edu.in

Campion School is a private Catholic primary and secondary school located at 13 Cooperage Road, Mumbai, in the state of Maharashtra, India. Established in 1943 by Jesuit Fr. Joseph Savall, the school is named in honour of Saint Edmund Campion, a 16th-century English Roman Catholic martyr. From 1943 till 2025 the school was only for boys. In 2025 when the School transitioned from the ICSE Curriculum to the IGCSE Curriculum, even girls were given admission.

The school is housed in Wellesley House on Cooperage Road in the Fort neighbourhood of South west Mumbai. The school is across the street from Cooperage Ground, which is a major soccer stadium in Mumbai, as well as Oval Maidan a city landmark. The school has over 800 students and offers classes at elementary and secondary levels, ranging from preparatory to grade 10. It was affiliated with the ICSE school syllabus and has English as its primary language of instruction.

Campion School has been taking part in most of the inter-school events organized by the Government, and often has prevailed. In a 2009 pan-India survey of day boys schools, conducted by Education World magazine, Campion School was ranked first in the country, and in 2013 it garnered the penultimate place.

In 2025, Campion School launched the Campion International School and started the IGCSE Cambridge Early Years Programme for Age groups 3 years to 6 years for Nursery and Junior KG. Since 1943 Campion School has been an all boys school. This was the first time when girls studied alongside boys in the co-education model of schooling.

== History ==
Campion School was founded on 20 January 1943 by Father Joseph Savall, S.J. He had been the principal of St. Mary's High School, Mazgaon, for many years. In 1942, the Society of Jesus purchased Wellesely House on 13 Cooperage Road to house Campion School. But opposition from tenants delayed occupancy for 5 years, during which time the school was run from a ground floor rented at 45 New Marine Lines. It moved to Cooperage Road on 19 January. Within nine months the Department of Education recognised and registered Campion School under the Code of European Schools. It was authorised to teach up to Standard IV and to add one standard every year until the highest form was reached.

First Day Cover to Celebrate the Golden Jubilee of Campion School Mumbai

The school grew steadily in the late 1940s, but lacked a full-time principal, and Fr. Savall retired and returned to Europe in June 1949. Fr. Conesa, the director of the Technical Institute at St. Xavier's College, Mumbai, served as principal until December 1950. Jesuit authorities appointed Fr. E.F. More first full-time principal. More oversaw major renovations to Wellesely House including the acquisition of the second floor in 1954 and the addition of a fourth floor.

In 1956, Campion School attained the stature of a full-fledged high school with an enrollment of 382. It was recognised by the University of Cambridge as an A-certificate school and by the S.S.C. Board, Pune. In the same year, the first batch of students appeared for the Senior Cambridge Overseas Examination and all eight of them passed, five secured Grade I, one secured Grade II, and two secured Grade III. According to a rating in the Hindustan Times, the school's highest ratings are in "attitude towards learning, sports, social engagement, governance."

== Academics ==
The school year consists of two terms from May to April, with October as mid-year. The course of school studies extends from the Preparatory Class to Class 10. It is designed to prepare students for the ICSE Examination, conducted by the Council for the Indian School Certificate Examinations.

In addition to English which is the primary language of instruction, Hindi is taught from Class 1 and Marathi, the regional language of the state of Maharashtra, is compulsory from Class 1 to Class 8.

In 2016, Campion emerged first in both the junior (78 teams) and senior (82 teams) divisions of the 16th Hindu Young World Quiz. Also, a student from Campion won the gold medal in a mental abacus contest sponsored by UMCAS.

== School emblem ==
The present school emblem, launched on 29 August 1954 is in the form of a medieval shield. The shield has three major divisions, each with a different colour background, and a scroll containing the school motto in Latin "Gaudium in Veritate" which translates to "Joy in Truth". This motto is symbolically expressed by each of the three main divisions on the shield.

On the left side, against a red background is a rope shaped like a noose. It stands for the death of St. Edmund Campion, professedly for the love of Truth. On the right side, against a white background are three birds that stand for Joy while the star stands for Truth. Finally, at the base of the shield is to be found the logo of the Jesuits. It consists of the first three letters of Jesus' name in Greek Jesus Hominum Salvator (Ritzos). Contrary to the popular belief, the divisions and their background colours do not represent the colour of the four school "houses".

== Principals ==
The following individuals have served as principals of the school:

Ordinal	Officeholder	Term start	Term end	Time in office	Notes
1	J. Savall S.J.	1943	1949	5–6 years	
2	R. Conesa S.J.	1949	1951	1–2 years	
3	E. F. More S.J.	1951	1964	12–13 years	
4	F. Ribot S.J.	1965	1969	3–4 years	
5	H. Miranda S.J.	1969	1972	2–3 years	
6	D. Donnelly S.J.	1973	1974	0–1 years	
7	A. D'Mello S.J.	1974	1983	8–9 years	
(5)	H. Miranda S.J.	1983	1986	2–3 years	
8	K. Dyer	1986	1989	2–3 years	
9	M. D'Mello	1989	1990	0–1 years	
10	J. S. Lewis	1990	1998	7–8 years	
11	John Rodrigues	1998	2001	2–3 years	
12	P. Falcao	2001	2003	1–2 years	
13	Paul Machado	2003	2020	16–17 years	
14	Bhavna Mehrotra	2020	2021	0–1 years	
15	F. Swami	2021	2025	4–5 years	
16	Sarah Thomas	2025	incumbent	0–1 years	

== School organisations ==
All students are assigned to a house. There were three houses until the 1990s when Berchmans was added:

- Britto House (red), motto "Unity is strength" - named after St. John de Brito
- Loyola House (white), motto "Now or Never" - named after St. Ignatius of Loyola
- Xavier House (blue), motto "Never Give in" - named after St. Francis Xavier
- Berchmans House (yellow), motto "Service before self" - named after St. John Berchmans

The School Council is a body established to put into practice the aims and objectives of the house system. The Council is made up of the School Captain and his Assistant, the House Prefects and their Assistants, the Leaders, the Class Monitor of the upper classes, and representatives of activities and organisations. It serves as an advisory body to the administration.

School organisations include:

- 43rd East Bombay Cub Packs: selection of recruits for five Cub Packs is made from the Primary section.
- 43rd East Bombay Scout Troop: the selection of recruits for the Scout Troop is made in the Secondary section. As a rule, students who have been cubs are given preference. The Scout motto is "Be prepared".
- The 19th Mah. Junior NCC Air Wing and the 21st Troop Junior NCC Naval Unit 1st Mah. Bn. Wing: the NCC provides training for students with a view to developing in them officer-like qualities, thus enabling them to obtain commissions in the Armed Forces.
- The Road Safety Patrol (RSP), motto "We live to serve", provides service training to young men and women so as to stimulate interest in the safety from accidents for the people and to build up officers to enable the Police Force to expand in a time of emergency.
- The Junior Red Cross trains its members to care for their own health and that of others, and to help the sick and suffering, especially children.
- The Interact Club is a Junior branch of the Rotary movement and aims at fostering a sense of social concern and international understanding among young students. It undertakes relief projects on behalf of the underprivileged.
- Sanskar provides an opportunity to the students to follow and understand the cultural values of the ancient Indian Civilisation.
- The Nature Club of India represents the Youth Wing of the World Wildlife Fund. Its aim is to make India's children aware of the economic, cultural, and aesthetic value of national resources by spreading interest and knowledge about its wildlife, rivers, forests, and other natural resources.
- Elocution, Debating, and Dramatics: trains higher-class students in public speaking and drama. Prizes are awarded to the best individual speakers both in English and in Hindi and to the best Class and House in Inter-Class, Inter-House Elocution, Dramatic, and General Knowledge competitions.
- The Campion Review issued twice yearly fosters the literary talent of students. It is managed by an Editorial Board and includes news reports.
- The School Band, instituted by Fr. E.F. More, S.J, was revived in 1996. It plays at school functions such as the Republic Day parade, Independence Day, and the Annual Athletics Meet.
- The Audio-Visual Instruction Room screens educational films, documentaries, and video cassettes.
- Games and Sports: the school has a gymnasium where all boys of the Senior School have a programme of physical education. The wide range of co-curricular activities includes soccer, cricket, athletics, gymnastics, swimming, basketball, music, drama, debates and elocution, along with badminton, table-tennis, and lawn tennis. There are annual meets for athletics, aquatics, and a Junior Sports Festival. In 2015 Campion won the Under-16 Mumbai School Sports Association (MSSA) Division 1 title. Education Today magazine ranked Campion number one in sports education in 2016.
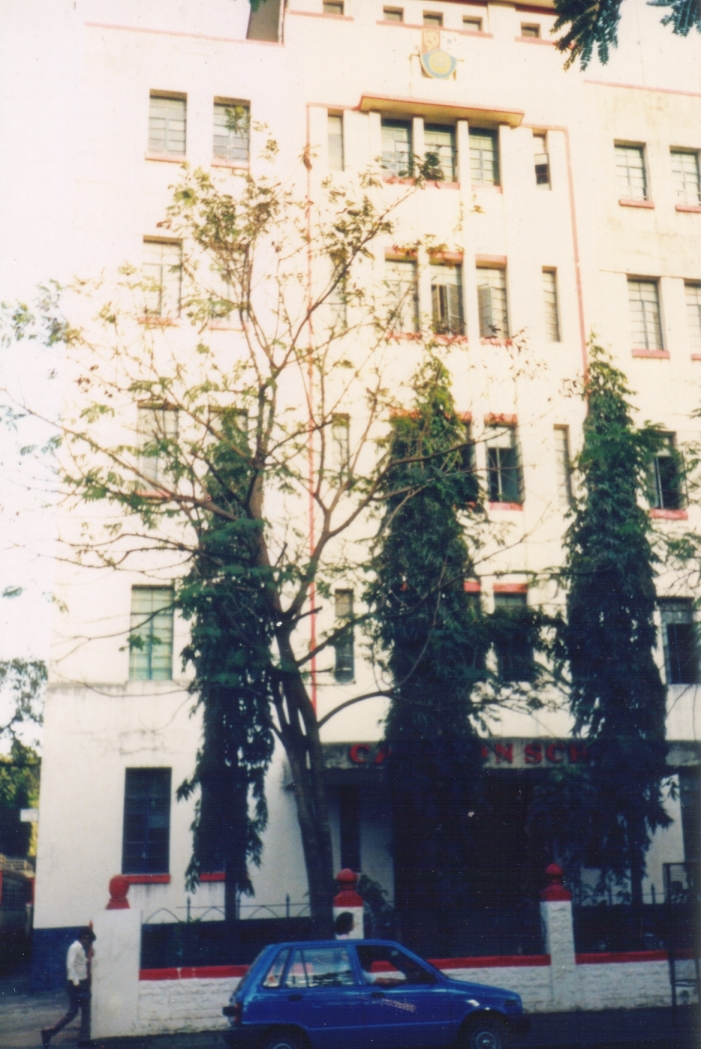
Main building in 1987

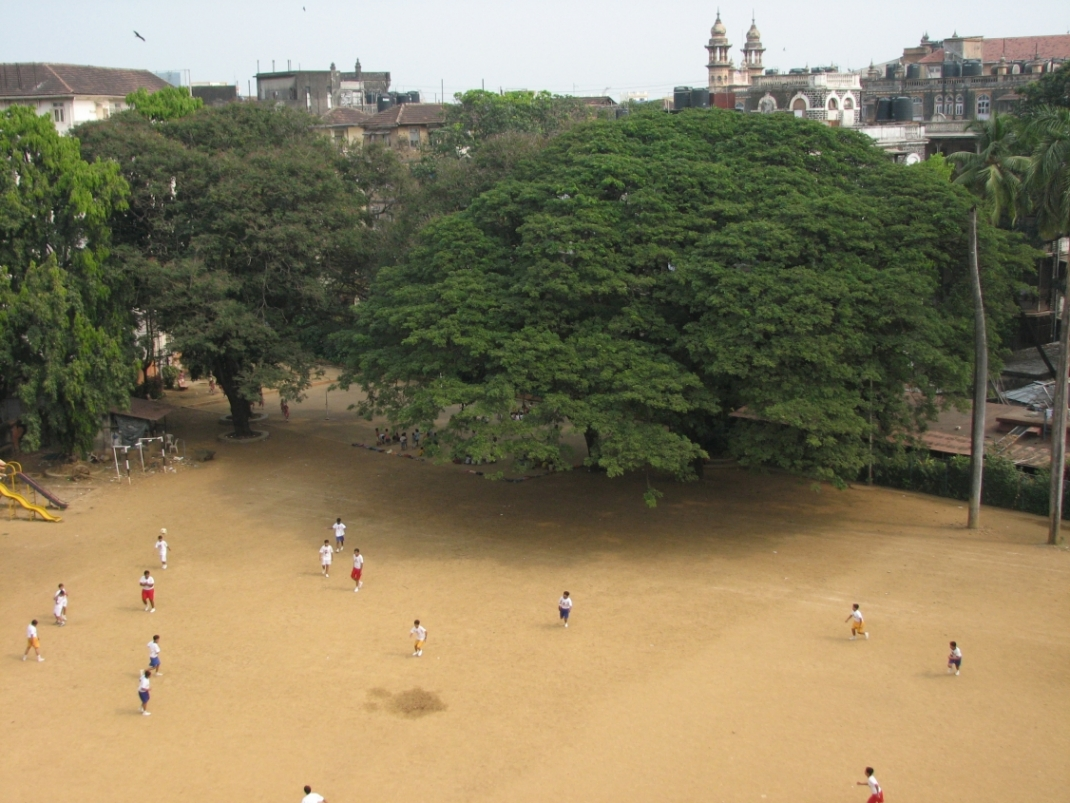
Backgarden, view from school terrace

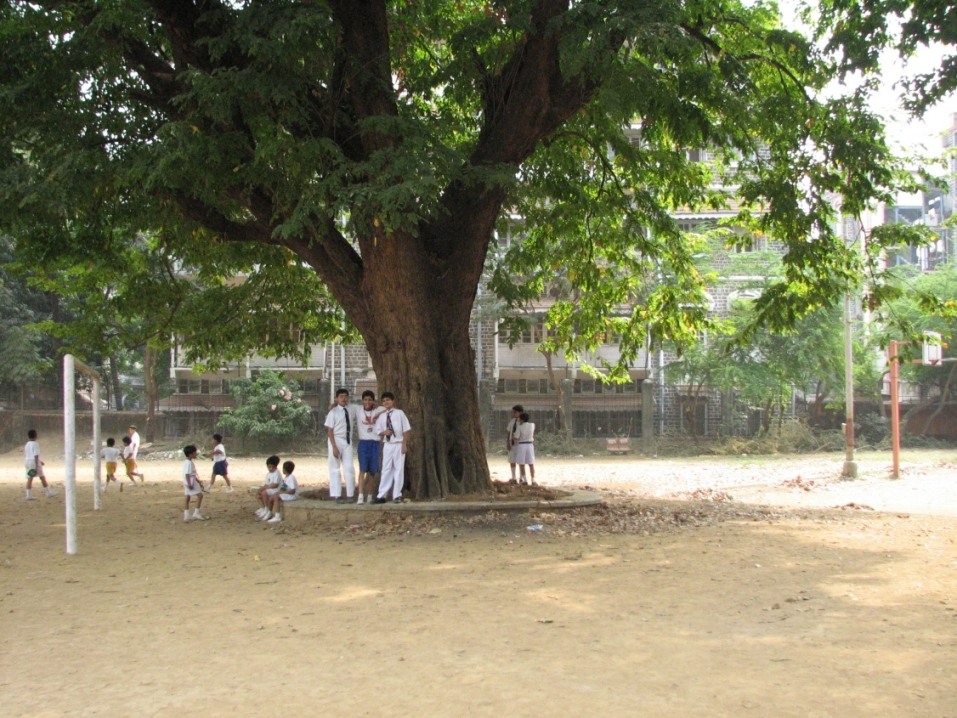
Backgarden's oldest tree

== Notable alumni ==
Business and industry

- Kumar Mangalam Birla - Chairman, Aditya Birla Group
- Niranjan Hiranandani - Managing Director, Hiranandani Group
- Pramit Jhaveri - CEO, Citi India
- Mahesh Madhavan - CEO, Bacardi
- Keki Mistry - Vice Chairman & CEO, Housing Development Finance Corporation
- Bhaskar Pramanik - Chairman, Microsoft India
- Ratan Tata - Former chairman of Tata Sons and Tata Group

Politics

- Praful Patel - former Minister of Heavy Industries, Government of India
- Jyotiraditya Scindia - politician and former Maharaja of Gwalior State
- Shashi Tharoor - former diplomat, Former Minister of State (Ministry of HRD and External Affairs) in the Government of India

Film and fashion

- Ranjit Chowdhry - Bollywood and Hollywood actor, screenwriter
- Sanjay Gadhvi - Bollywood director
- Jugal Hansraj - Bollywood actor
- Randhir Kapoor - Bollywood actor, producer & director
- Rajiv Kapoor - Bollywood actor
- Rishi Kapoor - Bollywood actor
- Atul Kasbekar - photographer
- Tarun Tahiliani - fashion designer
- Viveck Vaswani - Bollywood actor, producer

Literature, theatre and journalism

- Maxim Mazumdar - dramatist and playwright, founder of the now-folded Phoenix Theatre in Montreal, Quebec, Canada
- Dom Moraes - Goan writer and poet
- Rajdeep Sardesai - journalist and recipient of the Padma Shri in 2007 for contributions to Indian journalism

Science

- Mustansir Barma - theoretical physicist, recipient of the Shanti Swarup Bhatnagar (1995) and Padma Shri (2013) awards and director of TIFR from 2007-2014
- Adi Bulsara - physicist prominent in field of nonlinear dynamics
- Shiraz Minwalla - theoretical physicist and string theorist, recipient of the Shanti Swarup Bhatnagar (2011) and TWAS Prize (2016) award from The World Academy of Sciences
- Vikram Patel - leading psychiatrist and recipient of Rhodes Scholarship and MacArthur Foundation Fellow for Leadership Development
- Mukesh Batra - Founder of Dr Batra's Healthcare

Military and police

- Himanshu Roy, Indian Police Service

== In popular culture ==
The school is mentioned in Salman Rushdie's book The Moor's Last Sigh as a school for boys from "good homes".

Other schools mentioned in a similar context are Cathedral and John Connon School and Walsingham House School.

== See also ==
- List of Jesuit schools
- List of schools in Mumbai
- Violence against Christians in India
