= Basilica of St. John de Britto =

- Location within Tamil Nadu
- 9.8507034°N 79.0495628°E
- Location: Orur, Tamil Nadu
- Address: Orur (Oriyur), Ramnad District, Tamil Nadu, India, PIN 623406
- Country: India
- Denomination: Catholic
- Website: www.johndebrittoshrine.com

History
- Status: Basilica

Architecture
- Functional status: Active
- Groundbreaking: 1948
- Completed: 1960

Administration
- Diocese: Sivagangai

The Basilica of St. John de Britto is a Catholic church and pilgrimage centre in Tamil Nadu. The church was built over the site of the martyrdom of St. John de Britto in Oriyur. The church has two tall towers that are visible from afar.

The foundation of the church was laid in 1948 and the church was completed in 1960. On 5 December 2023, it was announced that Pope Francis had bestowed the status of a minor basilica on the church.
