= Oriyur Pudhuvayal =

Oriyur Pudhuvayal Puduvayal
- village
- Location in Tamil Nadu, India Oriyur Pudhuvayal (India)
- Coordinates: 9.840189°N 79.055647°E
- Country: India
- State: Tamil Nadu
- District: Ramanathapuram

Government
  - Body: Orur panchayat
- Elevation: 10 m (33 ft)

Languages
  - Official: Tamil
- Time zone: UTC+5:30 (IST)

Pudhuvayal, also known as Oriyur Pudhuvayal and was historically known as Udayanar Samuthram, is a small village in Tamil Nadu, India. It is located in the Tiruvadanai taluk of Ramanathapuram district, and comes under the administration of the Orur panchayat. It is 36 kilometers from Devakottai, Sivagangai(Dt). The majority community are Muslims by faith. There is Primary School in Pudhuvayal run by Government. The nearest school is the St. Arul Anandar School in Orur.
