= De Britto High School Yogyakarta =

Catholic high school in Yogyakarta, Indonesia

De Britto College High School, Yogyakarta
- Educating Young Men to be Leaders in the Service of Others

Location
- Laksda Adisucipto 161, Caturtunggal, Depok, Sleman Regency; Special Region of Yogyakarta; Indonesia
- Coordinates: 7°46′58″S 110°23′37″E

Information
- Type: Private, Catholic, International school
- Motto: Dux Servus qui Competentia, Conscientia, et compassione (The leader serves with Competence, Conscience, and Compassion)
- Religious affiliation(s): Catholic (Jesuit)
- Established: 19 August 1948; 77 years ago
- Rector: Fr. Antonius Gustawan, SJ
- Principal: Prih Adiartanto
- Gender: All male
- Enrollment: 714
- Campus: Urban, 3.2 hectares (7.9 acres)
- Color(s): Green and yellow
- Nickname: JB (from John de Britto)
- Website: debritto.sch.id

De Britto College High School Yogyakarta ("JB" after John de Britto) is a private Catholic all-boys high school run by the Indonesian Province of the Society of Jesus (Jesuits) in Yogyakarta, Indonesia. It was founded by the Jesuits on August 19, 1948, on an eight-acre (3.2 ha) campus.

== Notable alumni ==
- Wregas Bhanuteja – film director; educated at De Britto College High School Yogyakarta, graduated in 2010.
