= Jebalamai Susaimanickam =

Most Reverend Jebalamai Susaimanickam
- Bishop Emeritus of Sivagangai
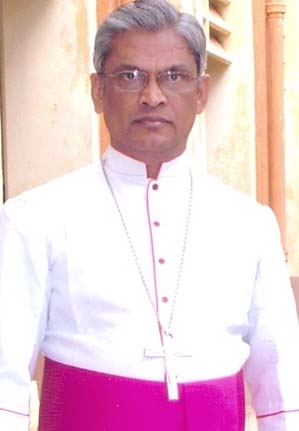
- Archdiocese: Madurai
- Diocese: Sivagangai
- Appointed: 1 September 2005
- Term ended: 1 September 2020
- Predecessor: Edward Francis
- Successor: TBD

Orders
- Ordination: 27 January 1971
- Consecration: 15 May 2005 by Peter Fernando

Personal details
- Born: 25 September 1945 (age 80) Maruthakanmoi, Tamil Nadu India
- Denomination: Roman Catholic
- Motto: CONFIDENT IN THE LORD

Bishop Jebalamai Susaimanickam was a bishop of the Roman Catholic Diocese of Sivagangai, India from year 2005 to 2020. He resigned from his services on reaching the episcopal retirement age on 1 September 2020.

== Early life ==
Susaimanickam was born in Maruthakanmoi, Tamil Nadu, India, on 25 September 1945.

== Priesthood ==
On 27 January 1971, Susaimanickam was ordained a priest for the Roman Catholic Archdiocese of Madurai.

== Episcopate ==
19 March 2005 Pope John Paul II announced, Susaimanickam to be appointed as Coadjutor Bishop of the Roman Catholic Diocese of Sivagangai, India and on 1 April 2005, he was appointed and consecrated as a bishop on 15 May 2005 by Peter Fernando.

On 1 September 2005, Susaimanickam succeeded as the bishop of the Roman Catholic Diocese of Sivagangai.

Susaimanickam resigned from his services as the bishop of the Roman Catholic diocese of Sivagangai on 1 September 2020 after reaching the retirement age.

== See also ==
- List of Catholic bishops of India
