= Mustansir Barma =

Indian physicist

Professor Emeritus at Tata Institute of Fundamental Research, Hyderabad DAE-Homi Bhabha Chair Professor
- Incumbent
- Assumed office 2018
- Succeeded by: Sandip P Trivedi

Personal details
- Born: 27 December 1950 (age 75) Mumbai, India
- Education: Campion School, Mumbai, St. Xavier's College, Mumbai, State University of New York at Stony Brook
- Profession: Professor, Author, Scientist

Mustansir Barma is an Indian scientist specializing in statistical physics. He was former director of the Tata Institute of Fundamental Research from 2007 to 2014 and currently Professor Emeritus at Tata Institute of Fundamental Research, Hyderabad DAE - Homi Bhabha Chair Professor.

== Early life ==
Mustansir Barma was born in Mumbai to a Dawoodi Bohra family.

== Awards and honours ==
- Young Scientist Award of the Indian National Science Academy (1980).
- Associate of the Indian Academy of Sciences (1983 – 86).
- Shanti Swarup Bhatnagar Prize for the Physical Sciences awarded by the CSIR (1995).
- Honorary faculty member, Jawaharlal Nehru Centre for Advanced Scientific Research, Bangalore (1998 – 2001).
- DAE Raja Ramanna Prize Lecture in Physics (2004).
- S.N. Bose Birth Centenary Award of the Indian Science Congress (2007).
- J.C. Bose Fellowship of the Department of Science and Technology (2007).
- Seventh Abdus Salam Memorial Lecture, Jamia Millia Islamia, New Delhi (2009).
- R.S. Goyal Prize for Physics (2006), awarded in 2010.
- Padma Shri Award (2013)
