= Idaikattur =

- village
- Location in Tamil Nadu, India
- Coordinates: 9.7°N 78.48°E
- Country: India
- State: Tamil Nadu
- District: Sivaganga
- Elevation: 70 m (230 ft)

Population (2009)
  - Total: 18,658

Languages
  - Official: Tamil
- Time zone: UTC+5:30 (IST)
- PIN: 630 560
- Telephone code: 914574 XX
- Vehicle registration: TN 63

Idaikattur is a village panchayat in Sivaganga district in the Indian state of Tamil Nadu.

== Geography ==
Idaikattur is located at Sivaganga District. It has an average elevation of 700 metres (2290 feet).

== History ==
Idaikattur is a small village 30 km from Madurai. For a big village, it has two important holy places to boast of.

It is a holy land where famed Siddhar Idaikaadar lived and hosted Navagrahas during a famine. A small Navagraha temple stands there as a testimony. Rajinikanth used to visit and worship this temple every year. The village also has a more prominent and internationally acclaimed Church "built by angels", which is more than 100 years old.

== Demographics ==
As of 2001 India census, Idaikattur had a population of 18,658. Males constitute 45% of the population and females 45%. In Idaikattur, 10% of the population is under 6 years of age.

== Agriculture ==
A vast majority of the workforce is dependent on agriculture (72.8%). The principal crop of Idaikattur village is paddy. The other crops that are grown are sugarcane and groundnut.

== Schools ==
- Idaikattur Panchayat Board Primary School
- Idaikattur Higher Secondary School
- Sacred Heart Middle School

== Tourism ==
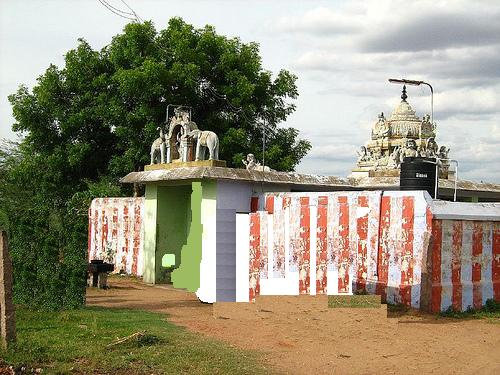
A view of Navagraha Temple

== Sacred Heart shrine ==
=== Sacred Heart of Jesus ===
This unique church of the sacred heart of Jesus was built in 1894 AD by a French missionary Fr. Ferdinand Celle SJ. This is a replica of the Rheims Cathedral in France. Since the church was said to be built by angels, Fr. Ferdinand Celle SJ has placed 153 depictions of angels in and around the church He has depicted the relics of forty saints in four elliptical shaped wooden bowls, which rest over the wooden heart in the main altar portion. We pray for all the devotees of the sacred heart continuously through these heavenly beings.

=== Sacred Heart shrine ===
Although the sacred heart shrine at Idaikattur is a replica of the Rheims cathedral in France, It has some unique features It is constructed with 200 different types of moulded bricks and tiles in lime martyr. They are used for its decoration. The inner Gothic arches rest over the columns embedded with ribs its corner rising up to the vaulted roof. The windows are decorated with small brick pillars adjoined with hallow flower bricks and stained glass works which depicts the events of the way of the cross colourfully and beautifully. Since south India is a tropical country utilization of the hallow bricks in the construction reduces the heat and also there is a vacuum gap between inner vaulted roof makes an air-conditioned system below the shelter of the wall. The stucco figures and the statues of saint, angels and the sacred heart of Jesus, his foster father St. Joseph and the Holy family statue with golden gilt and the mother of sorrows are of great beauty and symbol of ancient French art work. Historical events of the conversion given by St. John de Britto to Kattayadevan, son-in-law of Kilavan Sethupathi king from Hinduism to Christianity and de Britto's sentence of death by king Kilavan Sethupathi are depicted in stained glass work on northern and southern entrance facade. The main altar of the church is more beautiful with gigantic Gothic facade of 45 feet high with stucco figures of God the father holding His only crucified son Jesus by his hands and the holy spirit proceeding from his chest surrounded by angels in clouds and in the glittering gold rays of the sun around the whole work are relief from the wall. This main altar depicts the doctrine of the Christianity i.e., the Father, the Son and the Holy Spirit are in one and the same clearly shown to all people who look at it. The Gothic arches are decorated with rows of beads, flowers, garlands. They all are in terracotta works.

=== Pascaa stage drama ===
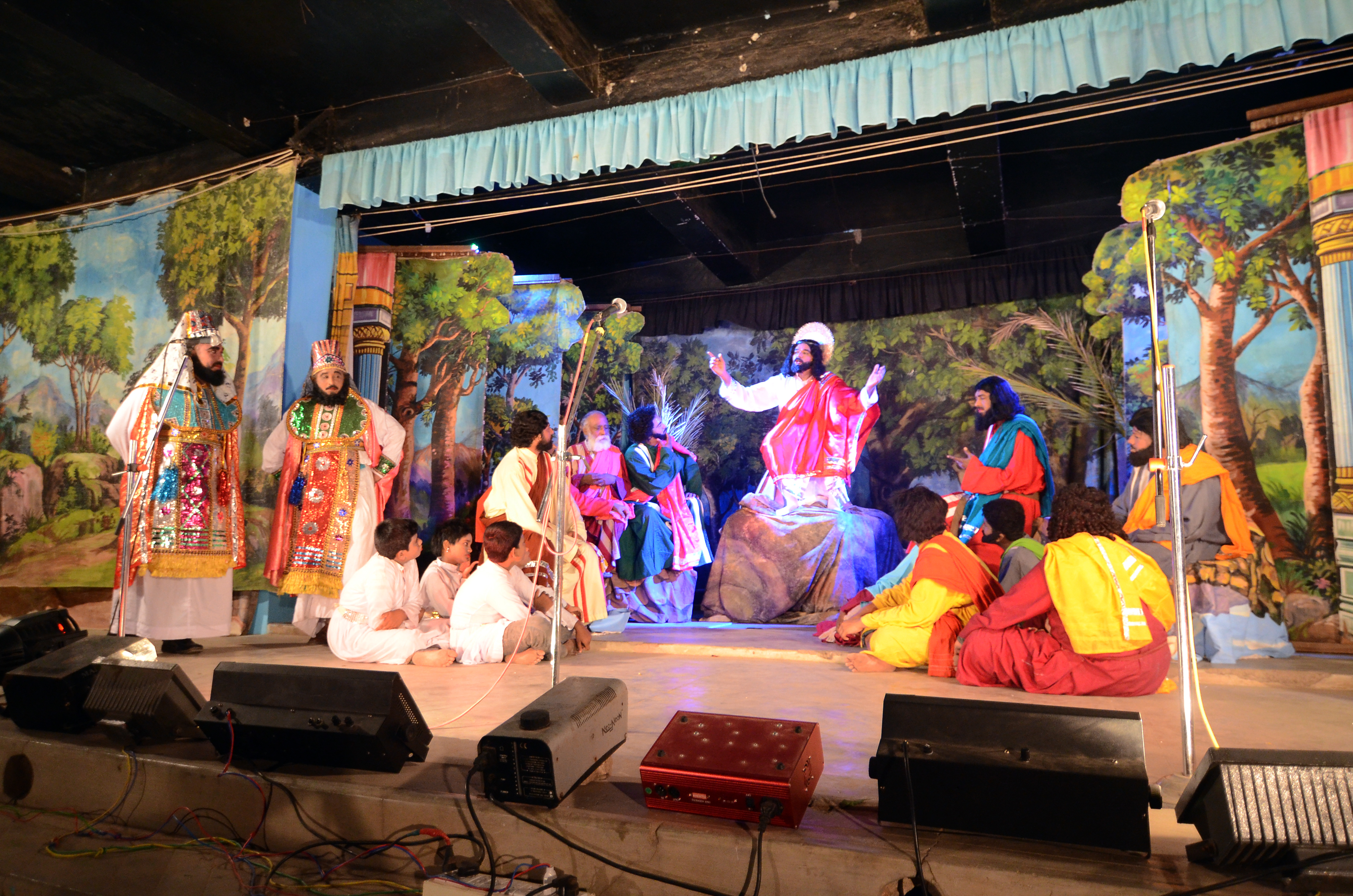
Scene from Pascaa

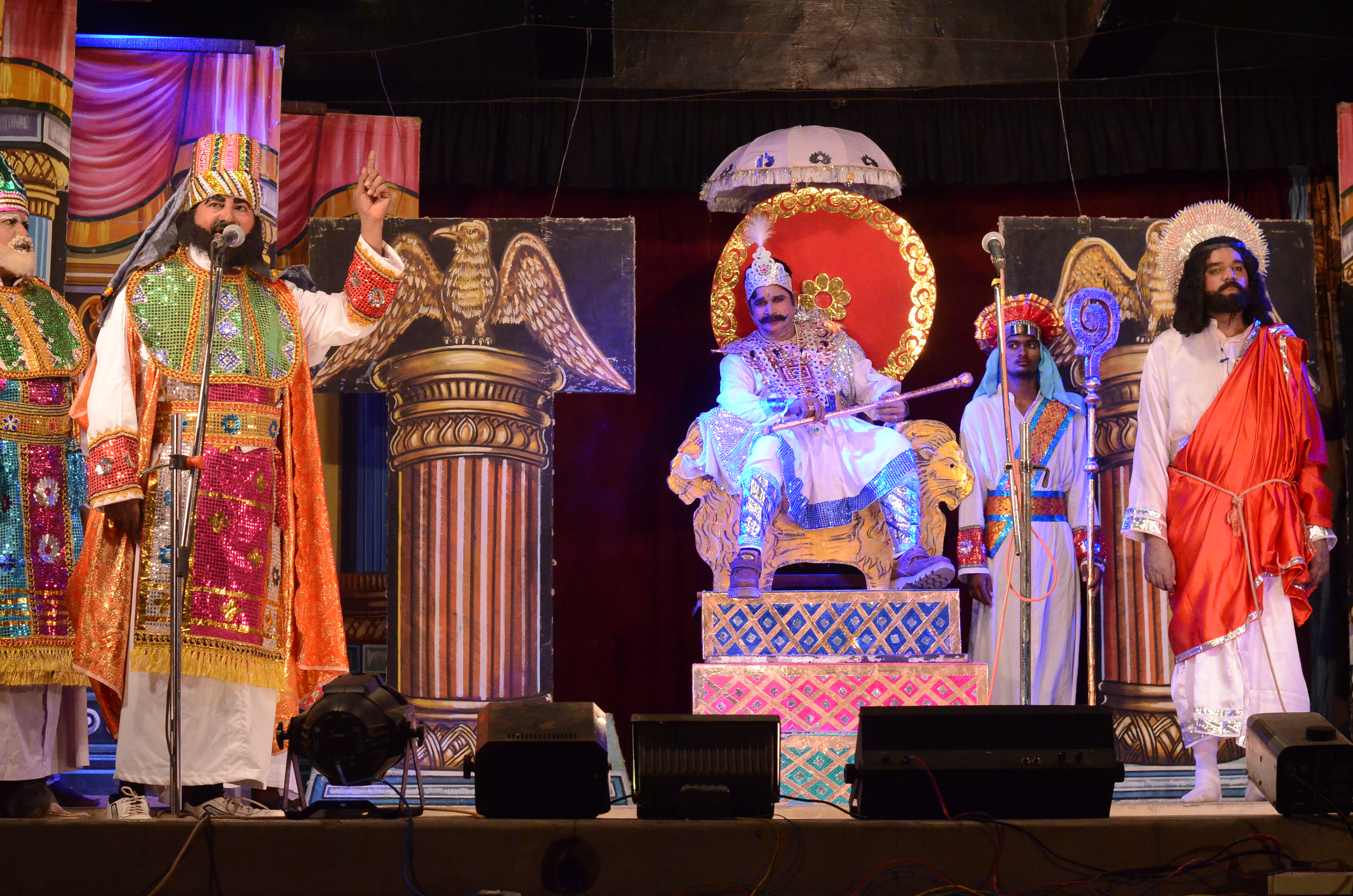
Scene from pascca

Pascaa is a Festival that was celebrated by the Israel people in ancient days. Pascaa means crossing past. Here in Idaikattur, this festival is being celebrated for two days by the villagers on the next Friday and Saturday of the Good Friday, every year, for the past 139 years. In this event, the Life history of Jesus is staged as a drama, up to the death of Christ on the first day and up to the ascension on the second day.

The whole drama was scripted from Bible by a group of uneducated villagers, called " ANNAVIYAR" and the dialogues are never changed for this 3 generations which coincide anywhere and anytime in the common life. Based on the ancient Tamil cultural dramas of Tamil Nadu, this epic attracts tens of thousands of people from across the country. The lyrics of the songs of the drama which were penned by the same Annaviyar, composed with a mixture of western and classical music before 139 years, are proved as the best classicals of the two centuries.

The artists, numbering to a 100, are all the nativities of the village, inherit the ancient farmers of the village, who are in high positions of the society gather on this particular dates in the village from all over the world to submit themselves to the Sacred Heart of Jesus of Idaikattur.

The whole programme is a citadel for all the villagers apart from their religion and community.

The proposal for the Guinness record is also submitted and is in process.

== Politics ==
Idaikattur comes under Manamadurai assembly constituency (SC) is part of Sivaganga (Lok Sabha constituency)

== Transport ==
On Madurai-Rameswaram NH between Madurai - Manamadurai lies ‘Muthanendal’ a non-descript small village. The speeding half-body Sand laden lorries in this route are dangerous. After one crosses this stretch and the village ‘Thiruppachethi', famous for long aruval (thirupaachi aruva), the traffic is sparse and the road becomes less dangerous. ‘Muthanendal’, a non-descript bus stop and a few other stops may not be seen due to heavy traffic.
