= St John De Britto Anglo-Indian High School, Fort Kochi =

St John De Britto A.I.B.H.School

Location
- Elphinstone Road; Cochin, Kerala, 682001; India; 9.963006°N 76.239924°E

Information
- Type: State aided higher school
- Motto: "Lead Kindly Light"
- Established: 15 January 1945
- Founder: Benedictine Fathers
- School board: Kerala Education Department - Kerala Gov
- School district: Ernakulam
- Authority: Msgr Shaiju Pariathussery Diocese of Cochin Bishop's House, Bp Joseph Kureethara Road Fort Cochin, Cochin- 682001
- Ofsted: Reports
- Staff: 20
- Gender: Boys
- Age: 4 to 16
- Capacity: 1000
- Colours: Navy and white

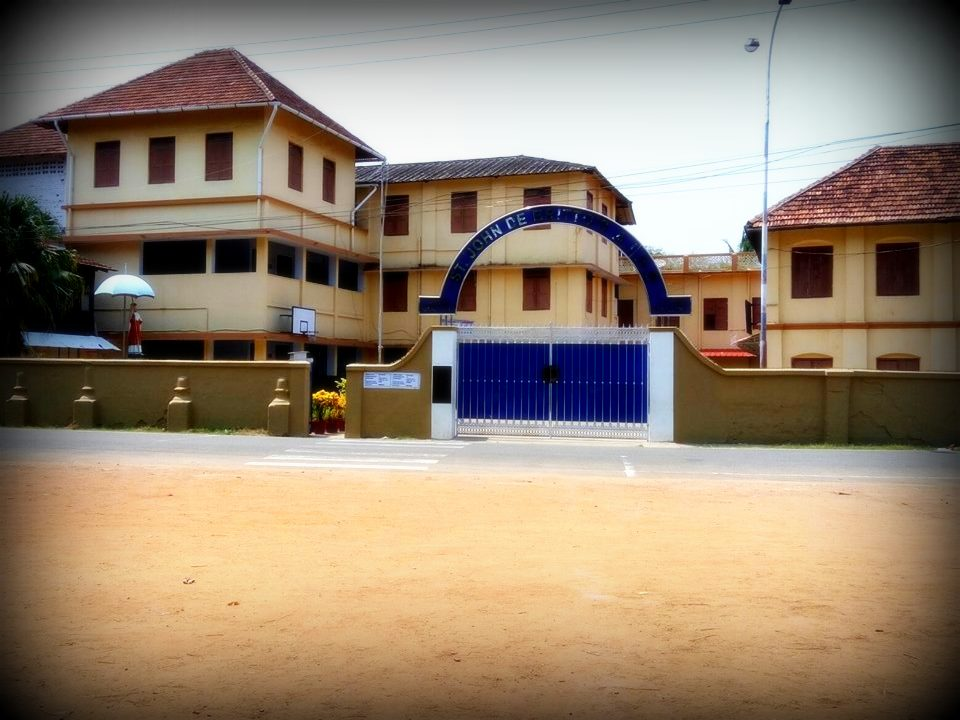
School before renovation of gate in 2015

St. John De Britto Anglo-Indian High School is a secondary school in Fort Cochin, Kerala, India. The school is named after John de Britto, a 17th-century Portuguese Jesuit missionary and martyr.

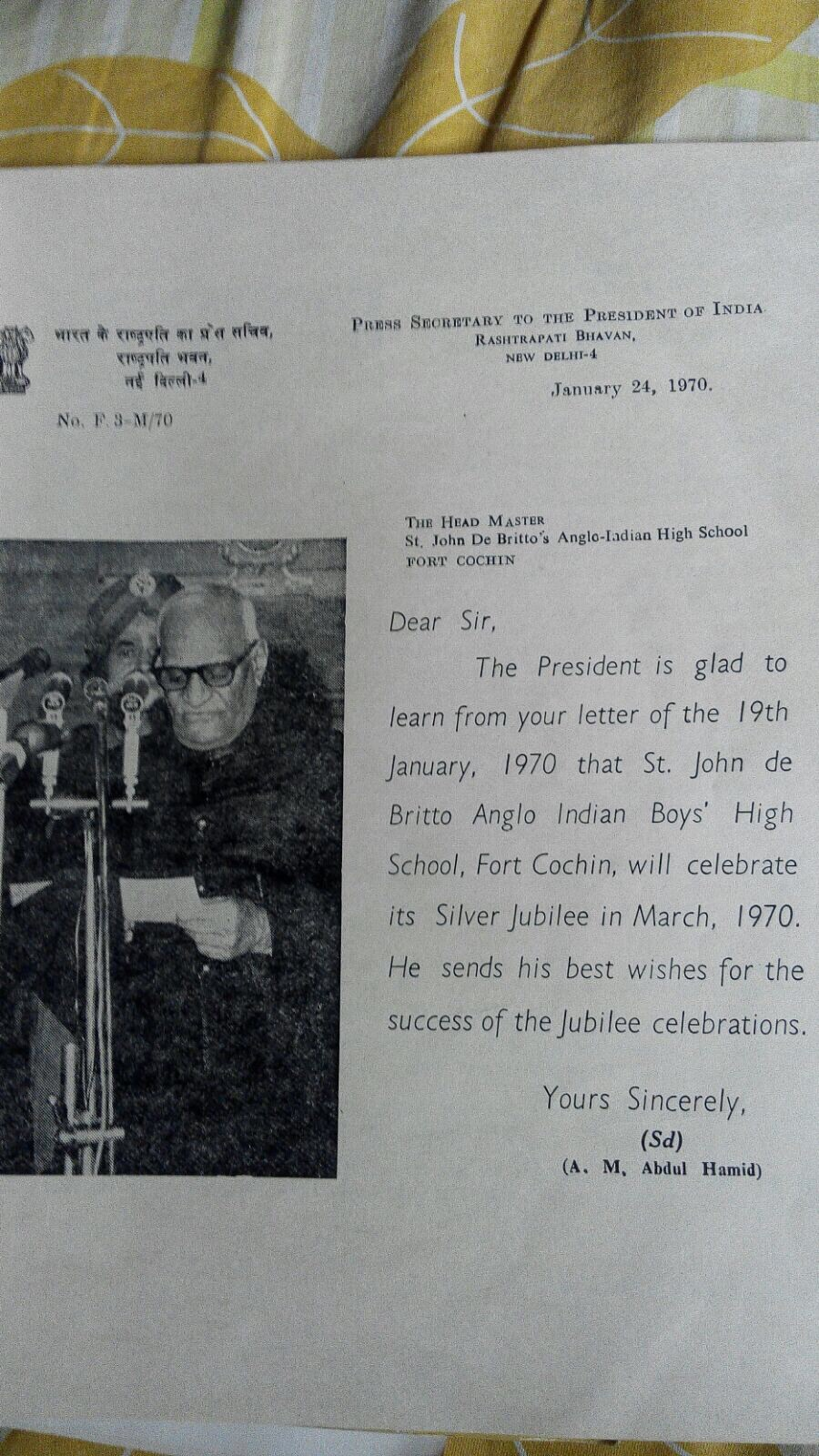
Letter from the president of India on the school's Silver Jubilee year

The school started operation in 1945 and celebrated its Silver Jubilee in 1970.

== History ==
St John de Britto's AIHS was started on 15 January 1945, a Monday, by Rev. Fr. Jose Maria Das Noves, with 7 staff members and 91 pupils on the rolls. The school timing was from 10:30 am to 5:05 pm.

The Benedictine Fathers who managed the school handed over charge to the Bishop of the Diocese. They had to leave the country on 30-11-1953 as their Visas were not extended by the Govt.

== Medium of education and certification ==
Since it was a school formed for the minority community of Anglo Indians, the medium of education was English and it was strictly followed till it was transferred to the board of secondary education of Government of Kerala.

Britto boys pass out with tenth Grade Certificate of Secondary School Leaving certificate (SSLC). The first batch of students who passed out with SSLC was the 1986 batch students, till 1985 the tenth grade passout was granted Certificate from the Madras Syllabus.

== Academic achievements ==
Total number of students for SSLC in 2013 179 (passout 177)

== Sport ==
The school won the overall championship in wrestling at the district mini games held at Muvattupuzha, in January 2009.

== Notable alumni ==
- K. J. Yesudas, Indian Carnatic musician and Malayalam film playback singer
- Anil Johnson, music director for many Malayalam movies and advertisements
- Vinay Forrt, cine artist
