= Diocese of Sivagangai =

Latin Catholic diocese in Tamil Nadu, India

Diocese of Sivagangai Dioecesis Sivagangaiensis சிவகங்கை மறைமாவட்டம்
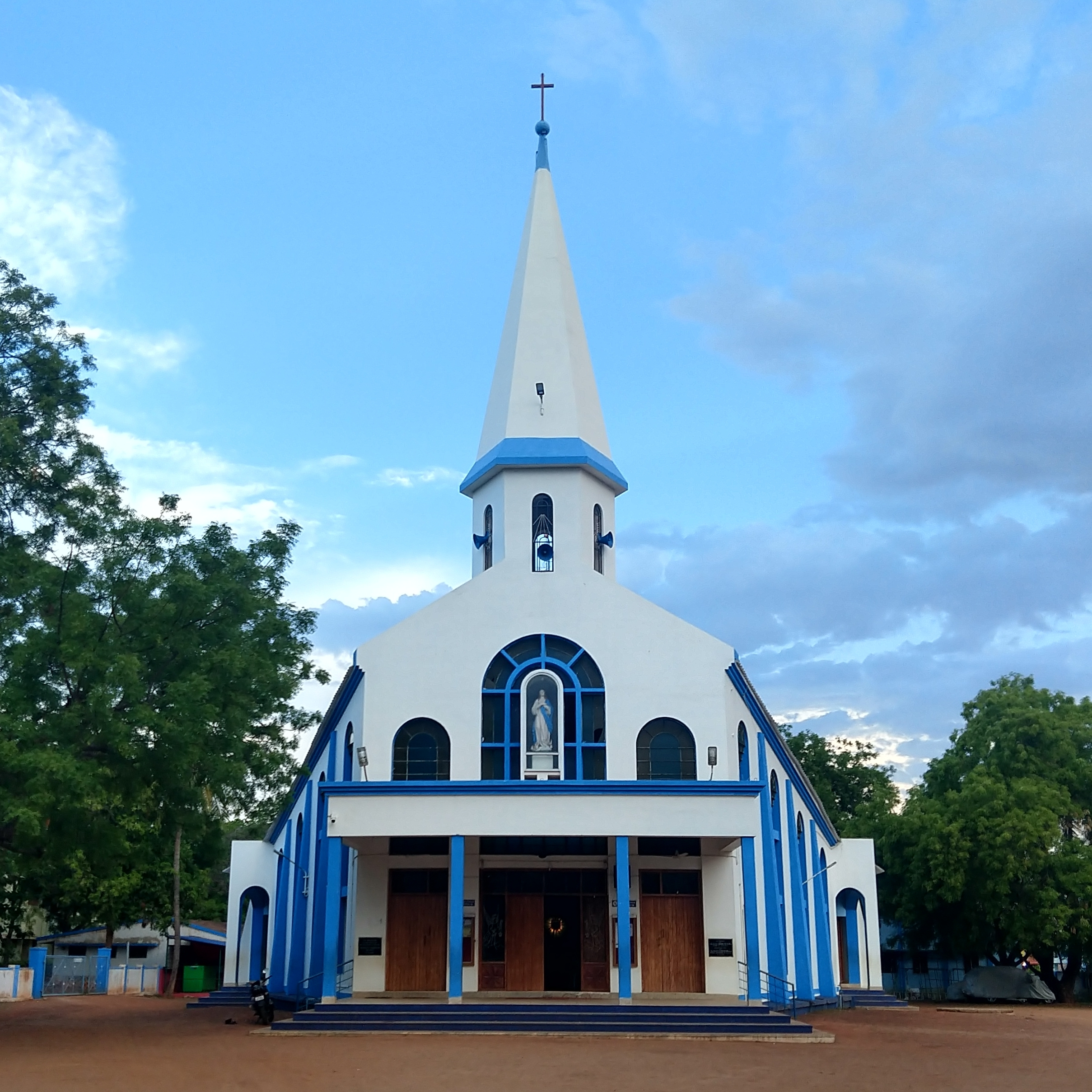
- Alangara Annai Cathedral, Sivagangai

Location
- Country: India
- Territory: Ramanathapuram and Sivagangai
- Metropolitan: Archdiocese of Madurai
- Coordinates: 9.8468°N 78.4792°E

Statistics
- Area: 8,353 km^{2} (3,225 sq mi)
- Population: Total; Catholics: (as of 2022); 3,123,623; 182,150 (5.8%)
- Parishes: 82
- Schools: 160

Information
- Formation: 3 July 1987
- Denomination: Catholic Church
- Sui iuris church: Latin Church
- Rite: Roman Rite
- Established: 3 July 1987; 39 years ago
- Cathedral: Alangara Annai Cathedral
- Co-cathedral: Basilica of St. John de Britto
- Saint: John de Brito
- Secular priests: 177 (98 Diocesan, 79 Religious Orders)

Current leadership
- Pope: Leo XIV
- Bishop: Lourdu Anandam
- Metropolitan Archbishop: Antonysamy Savarimuthu
- Bishops emeritus: Jebalamai Susaimanickam

The Diocese of Sivagangai is located at the southeast corner of Bay of Bengal, 45 km east of Madurai city, in Tamil Nadu, India.

== History ==
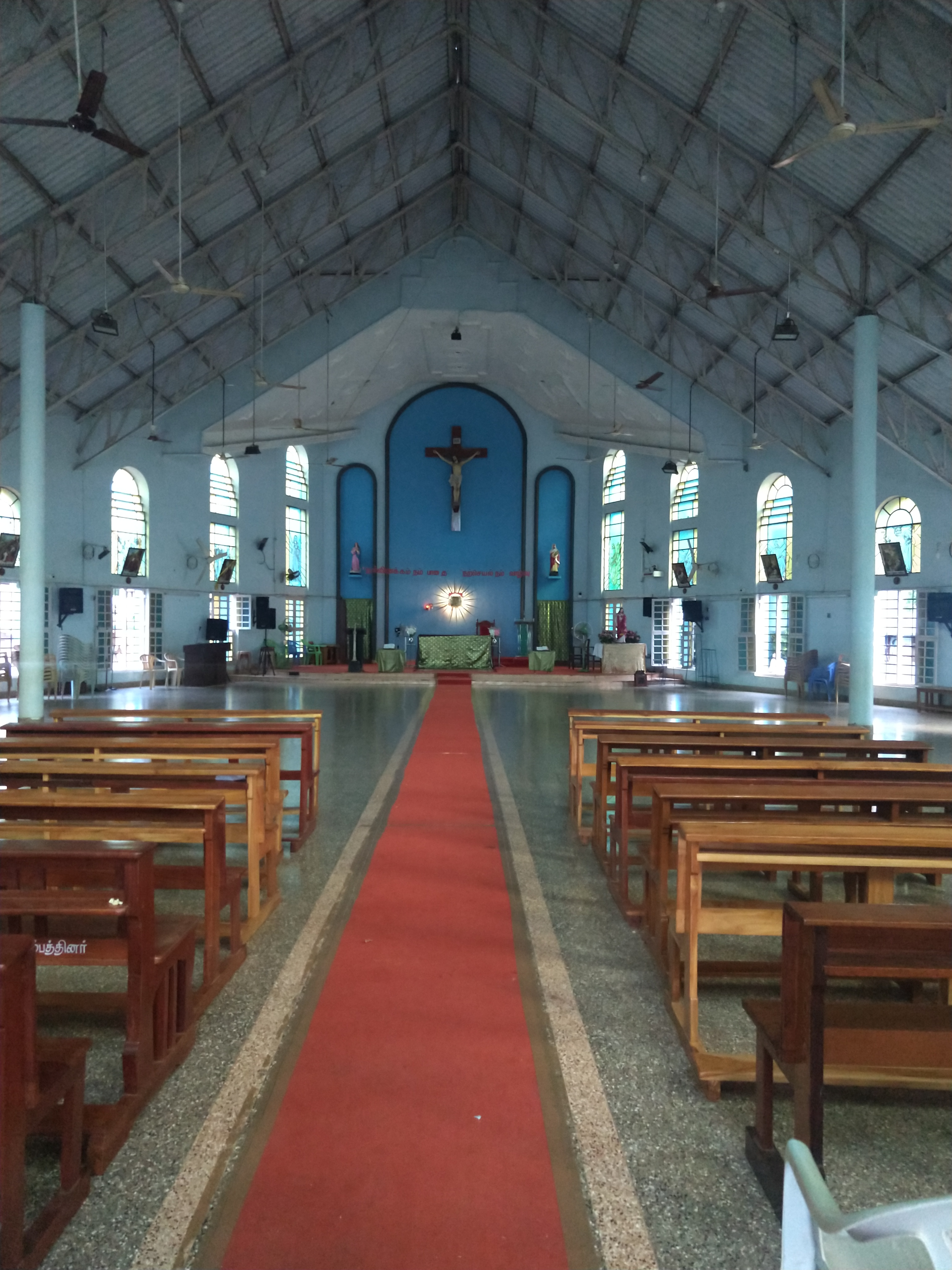
Alangara Annai Cathedral

It was established on 25 July 1987, bifurcated from the Archdiocese of Madurai. The Most Rev. S. Edward Francis was the First Bishop of the new Diocese and Bp. Jebamalai Susaimanickam succeeded him as the second bishop. On 21 September 2023, The Most Rev. Dr. Lourdu Anandam was announced as the third bishop of the diocese, and his episcopal consecration took place on 26 November 2023.

The territory of the diocese includes two civil districts Ramanathapuram and Sivagangai. As of 2022, the total population of the area is 3,123,623 of which the Catholic population is 182,150 (5.8%). The diocese has 82 parish centers, 98 diocesan priests, 79 religious order priests and 583 religious men and women serving at various religious and educational institutions in the diocesan region.

== Ordinaries ==
Bishops of Sivagangai (Roman Rite)

- Edward Francis (3 July 1987 – 1 September 2005), retired
- Jebalamai Susaimanickam (1 September 2005 – 25 September 2020), retired
  - Apostolic Administrator Stephen Antony Pillai (4 June 2021 – 26 November 2023), Bishop of Tuticorin
- Lourdu Anandam (21 September 2023 – Present)

Coadjutor Bishop

- Jebalamai Susaimanickam (2005)

== Saints and causes for canonisation ==
- St. John de Britto (1693), the patron saint of the diocese, entered the region as a Jesuit missionary from Europe and became the bedrock of faith for thousands of people. He was beheaded at Oriyur on Feb 4, 1693 by a regional king for preaching about Jesus Christ and establishing churches.
- Servant of God Fr. Louis Marie Leveil, SJ
- Servant of God Fr. Antonio Pietro Criminali
