= Edward Francis (bishop) =

Indian Roman Catholic bishop

- Bishop of Sivagangai
- Church: Catholic Church
- Diocese: Diocese of Sivagangai
- In office: 3 July 1987 – 1 September 2005
- Predecessor: Diocese erected
- Successor: Jebalamai Susaimanickam

Orders
- Ordination: 25 March 1957
- Consecration: 30 August 1987 by Duraisamy Simon Lourdusamy

Personal details
- Born: 3 June 1930 Sendamaram (near Kadayanallur), Presidency of Fort St. George, British Raj, British Empire
- Died: 11 April 2017 (aged 86) Sivaganga, Tamil Nadu, India

Edward Francis (3 June 1930 – 11 April 2017) was a Roman Catholic bishop. Ordained to the priesthood in 1957, Francis served as bishop of the Diocese of Sivagangai, India, from 1987 until 2005.

== See also ==
- Catholic Church in India
