= N. Karupanna Odayar =

Indian politician (died 2022)

N. Karupanna Odayar was elected to the Tamil Nadu Legislative Assembly from the Papanasam constituency in the 1996 elections. He was a candidate of the Tamil Maanila Congress (TMC) party. He died on 10 January 2022.
