= Vibha Batra =

Indian writer

Vibha Batra is an Indian author, advertising consultant, poet, graphic novelist, lyricist, translator, travel writer, playwright, and columnist.

== Works ==
She has published 30 books including Zooni's Alarm Clock, Sound Town, Kushti Kid, Ghoul School, Chhau Champ, Lights Out, Kolam Kanna, Khushi Khele Luka Chhupi, His Excellency, Gobi Goes Viral, Pinkoo Shergill Pastry Chef, Star-Crossed, Incognito, The Secret Life of Debbie G (a graphic novel) Merry the Elephant's Rainy Day, Bathinda to Bangkok, The Reluctant Debutante, The Dream Merchants, Keeping it Real, Euro Trip, Ludhiana to London, Glitter and Gloss, The Activist and The Capitalist, Sweet Sixteen (Yeah, Right!), Seventeen and Done (you Done!), Eighteen and Wiser (Not Quite!), Family Crossword, A Twist of Lime, Tongue in Cheek, and Ishaavaasya Upanishad: Knowledge and Action.
