= St. John de Britto Church, Sesurajapuram =

Roman Catholic Church in Tamil Nadu, India

John de Britto Church
- Arul Anandar Church
- புனித அருளானந்தர் ஆலயம்
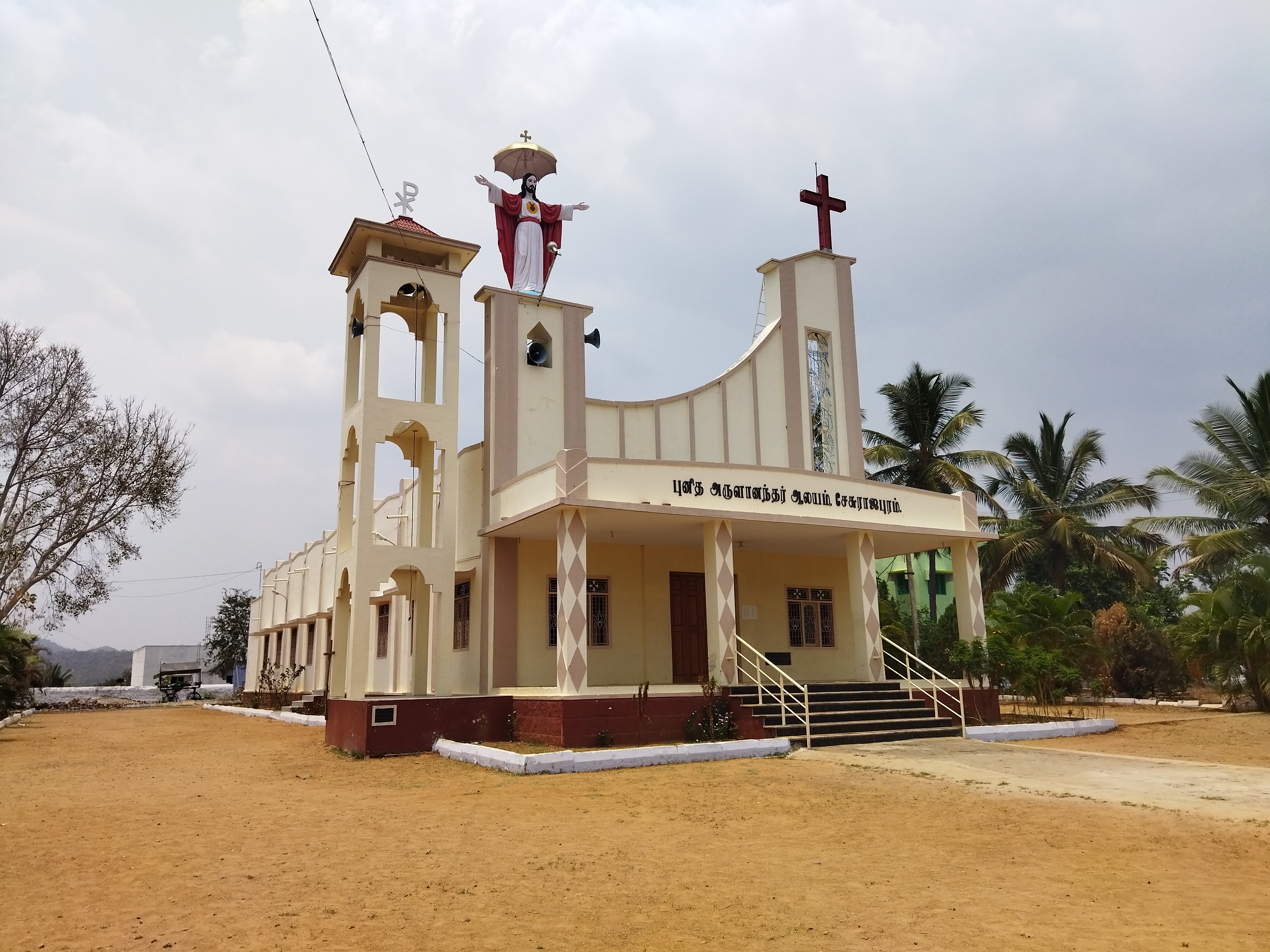
- Front View of this church
- John de Britto Church
- 12.2720°N 77.7432°E
- Location: Sesurajapuram, Natrapalayam, Krishnagiri Dt, Tamil Nadu
- Country: India
- Denomination: Catholic
- Religious institute: Jesuit

History
- Status: Parish church
- Founded: 1955
- Founder: Fr. Thomas Kuruvilla
- Dedication: John de Britto

Architecture
- Functional status: Active
- Architectural type: Church
- Style: Modern Architecture
- Groundbreaking: 1981
- Completed: 1983

Administration
- Archdiocese: Pondicherry and Cuddalore
- Diocese: Dharmapuri
- Deanery: Denkanikottai
- Parish: Sesurajapuram

Clergy
- Archbishop: Francis Kalist
- Bishop: Lawrence Pius Dorairaj
- Priest: Fr. A. Madalaimuthu

The John De Britto Church in Sesurajapuram is a renowned Roman Catholic parish church located in Krishnagiri District, Tamil Nadu, India. It falls under the administration of the Dharmapuri Diocese.

== History ==
In the early 1920s, the Mettur Dam project began, leading to the relocation of villagers from Nayambadi village. Some of these migrants settled near Natrampalayam village, which eventually became known as Sesurajapuram. In the 1940s, priests from Savariyarpalayam (Mettur) and Martalli (Karnataka) sent a request to the Kovilur priest, seeking spiritual support for the Catholics residing near Natrampalayam. The request was accepted, and Kovilur priests began visiting Sesurajapuram to conduct occasional masses. Over time, priests from Kovilur, Dharmapuri, and Dasarahalli Parishes provided care and support to the villagers of Sesurajapuram, with many baptisms recorded in Kovilur Church's baptism register between 1952 and 1974.

During the tenure of Dharmapuri Parish Priest Fr. Thomas Kuruvilla, this church became an official sub-station in 1968. Fr. Kuruvilla assisted the villagers in registering their farm lands, facilitating the acquisition of land deeds (Patta) with the help of register officers. The villagers named a lake in his memory as Kuruvilla lake.

From 1974 to 1979, the church came under the care of Dasarapalli Parish. During this period, a priest from the Congregation of Holy Cross (C.S.C) resided in Sesurajapuram and managed the church activities. Notably, Br. Kulandhai Francis worked in this village and later founded the NGO called IVDP in Krishnagiri, which focused on women's empowerment and later he helped by the construction of low-head dams in this village.

In 1979, the Sesurajapuram church was established as a Parish Church, with Fr. P. Lourdsamy appointed as its first parish priest. He resided in the village and oversaw the demolition of the old church, replacing it with a new church dedicated to martyr John de Britto. The new church was inaugurated on February 4, 1983, with the blessings of Salem Diocese Bishop Michael Bosco Duraisamy.

Fr. S. Singaroyan, who later became the Bishop of Salem Diocese, served as the parish priest of this church. During his tenure, a parish house was constructed and opened on August 26, 1985. In 2000, a bell tower was built near the church in celebration of the 50-year jubilee.

== Sub-station Churches ==
Catholics who worked in KGF relocated and formed a settlement near Masanatty village, which they named Arokiyapuram. In response to the spiritual needs of the Arokiyapuram villagers, Fr. K. Arokiya James built the Arokiya Madha Church, which was opened to the public on September 22, 2010.

To the north of Sesurajapuram hill, people have been celebrating yearly Pongal festival for Saint Anthony of the Desert for many years. In 2004, during Fr. Zacharias's tenure, a small chapel was built for this purpose. Every year on January 17, the feast of St. Anthony is celebrated there.

During the tenure of Fr. P. Lourdsamy, a grotto dedicated to Our Lady of Lourdes was built on the eastern side of Sesurajapuram hill. It was later renovated during Fr. Rosario's period. Every year on February 2, the feast is celebrated at this grotto.

== Schools ==
Education was of great importance to the priests of Sesurajapuram. As the village was located within a reserved forest, there was only one primary school near Nattrampalayam village, making it challenging for students to pursue high schools studies. To address this issue, the fathers sent students to Catholic boarding schools in Adaikalapuram, Madhakondapalli, Elathagiri, and Salem.

During the tenure of Fr. S. Singaroyan, 1.4 acres of land were acquired, and St. Peter's Primary School was established in Arokiyapuram village in 1989. In 1985, the FIHM Sisters from Pondicherry arrived and started their service and convent in Sesurajapuram, taking care of the school as well.

In 1993, St. Joseph Middle School was built to provide education to students who had completed primary education. It was later upgraded to a high school in 1997 and further upgraded to a higher secondary school in 2011.

== See also ==
- Christ the King Church, Dasarapalli
- St. Francis Xavier Church, Kovilur
