= Rajeev Batra =

Marketing scholar

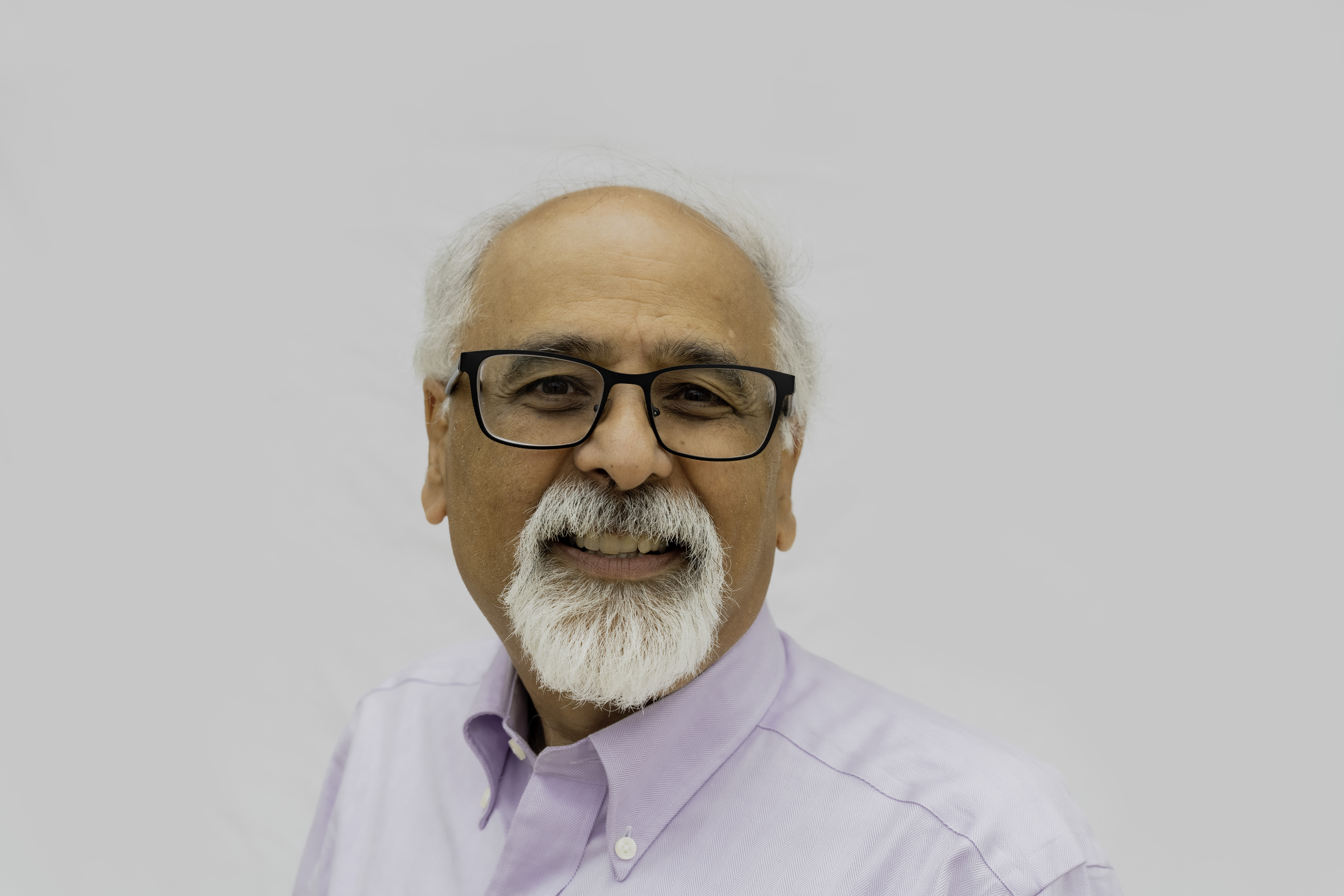
- Occupations: Marketing scholar, author and academic

Academic background
- Education: BA., Economics; MBA; MS., Advertising; PhD., Business/Marketing
- Alma mater: University of Delhi; Indian Institute of Management Ahmedabad; University of Illinois Urbana-Champaign; Stanford University

Academic work
- Institutions: Columbia University; University of Michigan

Rajeev Batra is a marketing scholar, author, and academic who serves as the Sebastian S. Kresge Professor Emeritus of Marketing at the University of Michigan.

Batra's research focuses on brand building and brand management, consumer–brand relationships, global branding, emerging markets and cross-cultural marketing, marketing communications, emotional advertising, and advertising effectiveness. He received the 2023 Fellow Award from the Society for Consumer Psychology in recognition of his contributions to the field.

== Education ==
Batra earned his B.A. in Economics from Delhi University in 1975, followed by an M.B.A. from the Indian Institute of Management Ahmedabad in 1977. He later obtained his M.S. in Advertising from the University of Illinois Urbana-Champaign in 1980 and completed his Ph.D. in Marketing at Stanford University in 1984.

== Career ==
After completing his M.B.A., Batra worked as a brand manager at Chesebrough-Pond’s in India from 1977 to 1979. Following his doctoral studies, he taught at Columbia University from 1984 to 1988. In 1989, he joined the University of Michigan's Ross School of Business and was appointed the Sebastian S. Kresge Professor of Marketing in 1999. He became the Sebastian S. Kresge Emeritus Professor in 2026. At Michigan, he chaired the marketing department from 2003 to 2007 and co-directed the Yaffe Center for Persuasive Communications from 1999 to 2017.

== Research ==
Batra has studied branding strategy, global branding, emotional advertising, and how consumer responses to advertising influence brand perceptions and purchasing behavior.

=== Emotional advertising ===
Batra's early research examined advertising processing and consumer response, with particular emphasis on the role of emotions in advertising. His studies developed response categories used by advertisers and experienced by consumers, mapping the affective and cognitive processes through which ad-evoked emotions influence consumer behavior. He showed that positive moods generated by emotional advertising reduce cognitive elaboration, foster favorable consumer evaluations, and strengthen brand attitudes—effects that are especially pronounced among individuals with low motivation to process ad content deeply. In collaboration with Keller, Batra also co-authored an article on the effectiveness of new ideas in marketing communications. He was listed among the most-cited advertising authors by Pasadeos et al. and his 1986 paper with Ray, and others, were listed among the most influential works in advertising by Beard.

=== Hedonic and utilitarian attitudes ===
In collaboration with Ahtola, Batra presented empirical evidence distinguishing between two components of consumer attitudes toward brands: a functional, utility-oriented utilitarian dimension and a sensory, pleasure-oriented hedonic dimension, along with measurement scales for each. They emphasized that these two dimensions are not mutually exclusive but vary in how they shape overall consumer attitudes depending on product attributes and consumer needs. For example, toothpaste combines both, its cleaning function is largely utilitarian, while entertainment preferences are primarily hedonic. This became the most commonly used reference and scale in the field for these constructs.

=== Brand personality and meaning ===
Batra's research examined how advertising and marketing shape brand personality. His work included experimental demonstrations showing how ad endorsers shape brand personality beliefs through meaning transfer processes, as well as reviews of existing and emerging scholarship on how brands acquire meaning. Additionally, his work on branding explored why private-label brands vary in market share across product categories, the perceived high-risk conditions under which corporate reputation is most likely to affect product evaluation, and methods to improve strategic planning of brand extension and licensing practices.

=== Brand globalness ===
Working with Steenkamp and Alden, Batra observed how consumers considered a brand as global, and introduced “perceived brand globalness.” They examined how factors such as quality, prestige, and “belongingness” influenced consumers’ preference for global brands at the time, and explored how brands adapted their marketing to create perceptions of global, local, or specific foreign-country origins. His work also looked into whether global brands should be positioned consistently or differently across countries depending on dominant cultural values, and the influence of consumers’ global-local identities on message processing. His papers on global branding received the 2007 Excellence in Global Marketing Research Award from the AMA Global Marketing SIG and the Thorelli Award from the Journal of International Marketing in 2013. In 2013, three of his research papers were ranked among the five most highly cited global branding publications by Chabowski et al.

=== Brand love ===
In collaboration with Ahuvia and Bagozzi, Batra has demonstrated how emotional needs can influence consumer relationships with brands. His “seminal” work on brand love used a grounded theory approach and conceptualized it as a complex multi-dimensional construct. Their brand love scale analyzed self-brand integration, passion-driven behaviors and positive emotional connection to understand consumer perceptions of brands which predict brand loyalty. This research has been widely cited and replicated by other scholars.

=== Brand coolness ===
In 2019, Batra and his co-authors, Warren, Bagozzi and Louriero, published a paper on ten dimensions that shape consumers’ perceptions of a brand’s overall ‘coolness,’ including authenticity, quality, design, creativity, youthfulness, nonconformity, prestige, subcultural ties, trendiness, and symbolic value. They showed that coolness can be obtained by focusing on factors such as aesthetic appeal and popularity. The authors further noted how brands go through a “life-cycle” of coolness, starting from niche, through mass, to uncoolness.

=== Cross-cultural consumer values ===
Batra’s research also investigated consumer attitudes in emerging markets and cross-cultural values, particularly in Asian countries. His work showed that Asian consumers living in collectivist societies prefer national and global brands for reasons that are linked to their needs for in-group status in their communities.

== Books ==
Batra has co-authored and co-edited nine books. These include Advertising Management with John G. Myers and David A. Aaker (1996), and The New Direct Marketing: How to Implement a Profit-Driven Database Marketing Strategy with David Shepard (1999). In 2012, he co-authored The New Emerging Market Multinationals with Amitava Chattopadhyay and Aysegul Ozsomer, which investigated how multinational companies from emerging markets have disrupted global industries. It was named among the best business books on strategy by Strategy+Business in 2012 and was reviewed in The Economist magazine. His books also include co-edited volumes, such as Cable TV Advertising with Rashi Glazer (1989), Marketing Issues in Transitional Economies (1999) which examined marketing challenges and strategies in transitional economies, and Persuasive Imagery: A Consumer Response Perspective with Linda M. Scott (2003), where they looked into how visual stimuli influence consumer behavior. Additionally, he published Leveraging Consumer Psychology for Effective Health Communications: The Obesity Challenge with Punam A. Keller and Victor J. Stretcher in 2011, and The Psychology of Design: Creating Consumer Appeal, with Colleen Seifert and Diann Brei in 2016.

== Awards and honors ==
- 2007 – Excellence in Research Award, American Marketing Association Global Marketing SIG
- 2012 – Hans B. Thorelli Award, Journal of International Marketing
- 2023 – Fellow Award, Society of Consumer Psychology
- 2025 – Lifetime Contribution Award to the Discipline of Branding, American Marketing Association Branding SIG

== Bibliography ==
=== Selected articles ===
- Batra, R.; Ray, M.L. (1986). "Affective Responses Mediating Acceptance of Advertising". Journal of Consumer Research. 13 (2): 234–249. doi:10.1086/209063.
- Holbrook, M.B.; Batra, R. (1987). "Assessing the Role of Emotions as Mediators of Consumer Responses to Advertising". Journal of Consumer Research. 14 (3): 404–420. doi:10.1086/209123.
- Batra, R.; Stayman, D. M. (1990). "The Role of Mood in Advertising Effectiveness". Journal of Consumer Research. 17 (2): 203–214. doi:10.1086/208550.
- Batra, R.; Ahtola, O.T. (1991). "Measuring the hedonic and utilitarian sources of consumer attitudes". Marketing Letters. 2 (2): 159–170. doi:10.1007/BF00436035. hdl:2027.42/47067.
- Alden, D.; Steenkamp, J.-B.; Batra, R. (1999). "Brand Positioning through Advertising in Asia, North America and Europe: The Role of Global Consumer Culture". Journal of Marketing. 63 (1): 75–87. doi:10.1177/002224299906300106.
- Batra, R.; Ramaswamy, V.; Alden, D.L.; Steenkamp, J.-B.E.M.; Ramachander, S. (2000). "Effects of Brand Local and Nonlocal Origin on Consumer Attitudes in Developing Countries". Journal of Consumer Psychology. 9 (2): 83–95. doi:10.1207/S15327663JCP0902_3.
- Steenkamp, J.-B.; Batra, R.; Alden, D. (2003). "How Perceived Brand Globalness Creates Brand Value". Journal of International Business Studies. 34: 53–65. doi:10.1057/palgrave.jibs.8400002.
- Batra, R.; Ahuvia, A.; Bagozzi, R. P. (2012). "Brand love". Journal of Marketing. 76 (2): 1–16. doi:10.1509/jm.09.0339.
- Batra, R.; Keller, K. L. (2016). "Integrating Marketing Communications: New Findings, New Lessons and New Ideas". Journal of Marketing. 80 (6): 122–145. doi:10.1509/jm.15.0419.
- Warren, C.; Batra, R.; Loureiro, S. M. C.; Bagozzi, R. P. (2019). "Brand Coolness". Journal of Marketing. 83 (5): 36–56. doi:10.1177/0022242919857698. hdl:10071/21000.

=== Selected books ===
- Batra, R.; Glazer, R., eds. (1989). Cable TV Advertising: In Search of the Right Formula. Praeger. ISBN 978-0899304069.
- Batra, R.; Myers, J.G.; Aaker, D.A. (1995). Advertising Management (5th ed.). Prentice Hall. ISBN 978-0133057157.
- Batra, R., ed. (1999). Marketing Issues in Transitional Economies. Springer. ISBN 978-1461372752.
- Scott, L.M.; Batra, R., eds. (2003). Persuasive Imagery: A Consumer Response Perspective. Routledge. ISBN 978-0805842029.
- Batra, R.; Strecher, V.J.; Keller, P.A., eds. (2011). Leveraging Consumer Psychology for Effective Health Communications. Routledge. ISBN 978-0765627186.
- Chattopadhyay, A.; Batra, R.; Ozsomer, A. (2012). The New Emerging Market Multinationals. McGraw-Hill. ISBN 978-0071782890.
- Batra, R.; Seifert, C.; Brei, D., eds. (2015). The Psychology of Design. Routledge. ISBN 978-0765647603.
