= John de Britto =

Portuguese Jesuit missionary and martyr

Saint John de Britto SJ
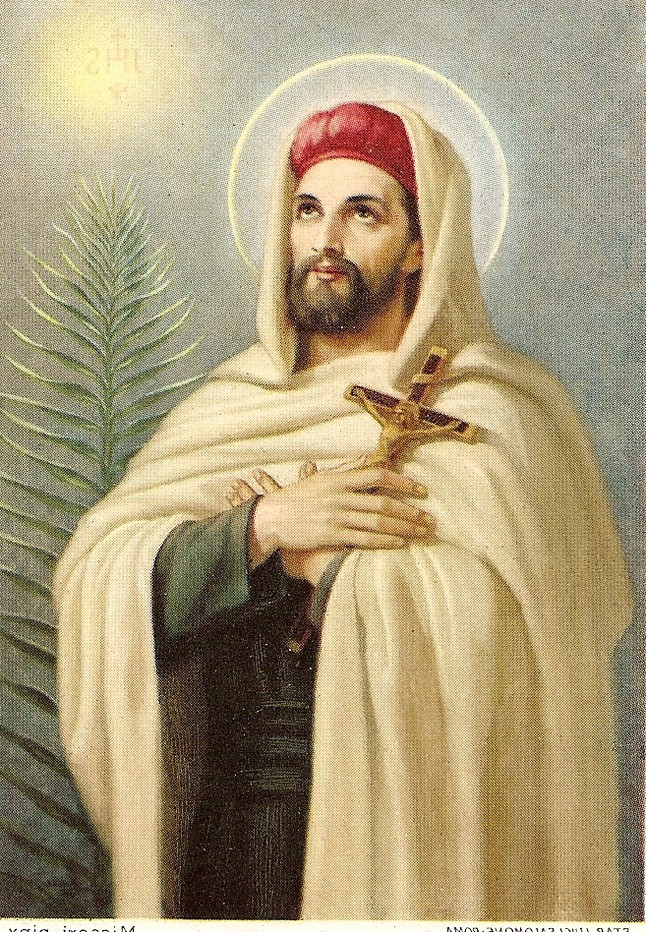

Martyr
- Born: 1 March 1647; Lisbon, Kingdom of Portugal and the Algarves (now Portugal)
- Died: 4 February 1693 (aged 45); Oriyur, Kingdom of Ramnad (now in Ramanathapuram district, Tamil Nadu, India)
- Venerated in: Catholic Church
- Beatified: 21 August 1853, Rome by Pope Pius IX
- Canonized: 22 June 1947, Rome by Pope Pius XII
- Feast: 4 February
- Attributes: Christogram, crucifix, staff, sannyasi robes, martyr’s palm
- Patronage: Portugal, St. John De Britto Church Sakthikulangara, Kerala, Roman Catholic Diocese of Sivagangai, The Roman Catholic Archdiocese of Madurai

Styles of John de Britto, S.J.
- Reference style: The Reverend Father
- Spoken style: Father
- Posthumous style: Saint

John de Britto, SJ (also Brito; Portuguese: João de Brito; also known as Arul Anandar; 1 March 1647 – 4 February 1693) was a Portuguese Jesuit missionary and an evangelist, often called "the Portuguese St. Francis Xavier" by Indian Catholics. He is also called "the John the Baptist of India."

== Early life and missionary work ==
John de Britto, born 1 March 1647 in Lisbon, Portugal, was the scion of a powerful aristocratic Portuguese family; his father, Salvador de Britto Pereira, died while serving as Viceroy of the Portuguese colony of Brazil. He joined the Jesuits in 1662, studying at the famous University of Coimbra. He travelled to the missions of Madurai, in Southern India, present-day Tamil Nadu, in 1673 and preached the Christian religion in the region of the Maravar country. He renamed himself Arul Anandar (அருளானந்தர்) in Tamil. The ruler of the Maravar country imprisoned him in 1684. Having been expelled, he returned to Lisbon in 1687 and worked as a missions procurator. King Pedro II wanted him to stay, but in 1690 he returned to the Maravar country with 24 new missionaries.

The Madurai Mission was a bold attempt to establish an Indian Catholic Church that was relatively free of European cultural domination. As such, Britto learned the native languages, went about dressed in yellow cotton, and lived like a Tamil Thuravi/Sannyasi, abstaining from every kind of animal food and from wine. Britto tried to teach the Catholic faith in categories and concepts that would make sense to the people he taught. This method, proposed and practised by Roberto de Nobili, met with remarkable success. Britto remained a strict vegan until the end of his life, rejecting meat, fish, eggs and alcohol, and living only on legumes, fruits and herbs.

== Execution ==
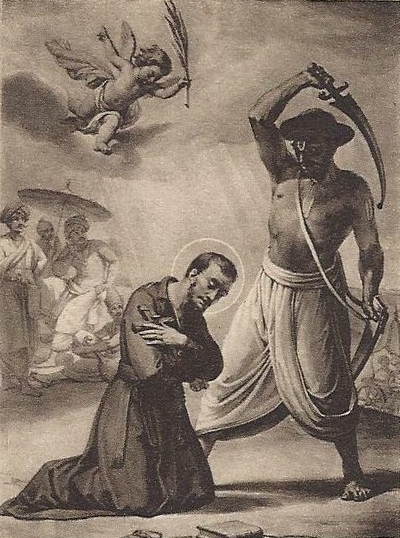
Martyrdom of Saint John de Britto Killed by Sethupathi King of Ramnad

De Britto's preaching led to the conversion of Thadiyathevan (தடியத் தேவன்), a Maravar prince who had several wives and was required as a Christian to dismiss all but one of them. One of those dismissed was a niece of the neighbouring king, the Raghunatha Kilavan Sethupathi (சேதுபதி), the King of Ramnad (Ramanathapuram), who took for her sake launched a general persecution of Christians. Britto and the catechists were seized and transported to the capital, Ramnad. From there he was taken to Orur (ஓரியூர்), (Note: At that time, the village was spelled Oriyur or Oreiour, but the modern spelling is Orur.) some 30 miles north along the coast, and was executed on 4 February 1693.

Britto was beatified by Pope Pius IX on 21 August 1853. He was canonised by Pope Pius XII on 22 June 1947. Saint John de Britto's feast day is 4 February.

== Shrine ==
This seashore sightseeing location is one of the most venerable pilgrim centres of Christians in the world over, as it is said to be the site of Britto's martyrdom. It was at this place where Britto is said to have been beheaded in 1693. The sand dune here is believed to have been stained by his blood. There is a shrine constructed in Portuguese style containing a statue of Britto, known locally as Arul Anandar, who had modestly offered his neck to the executioner.

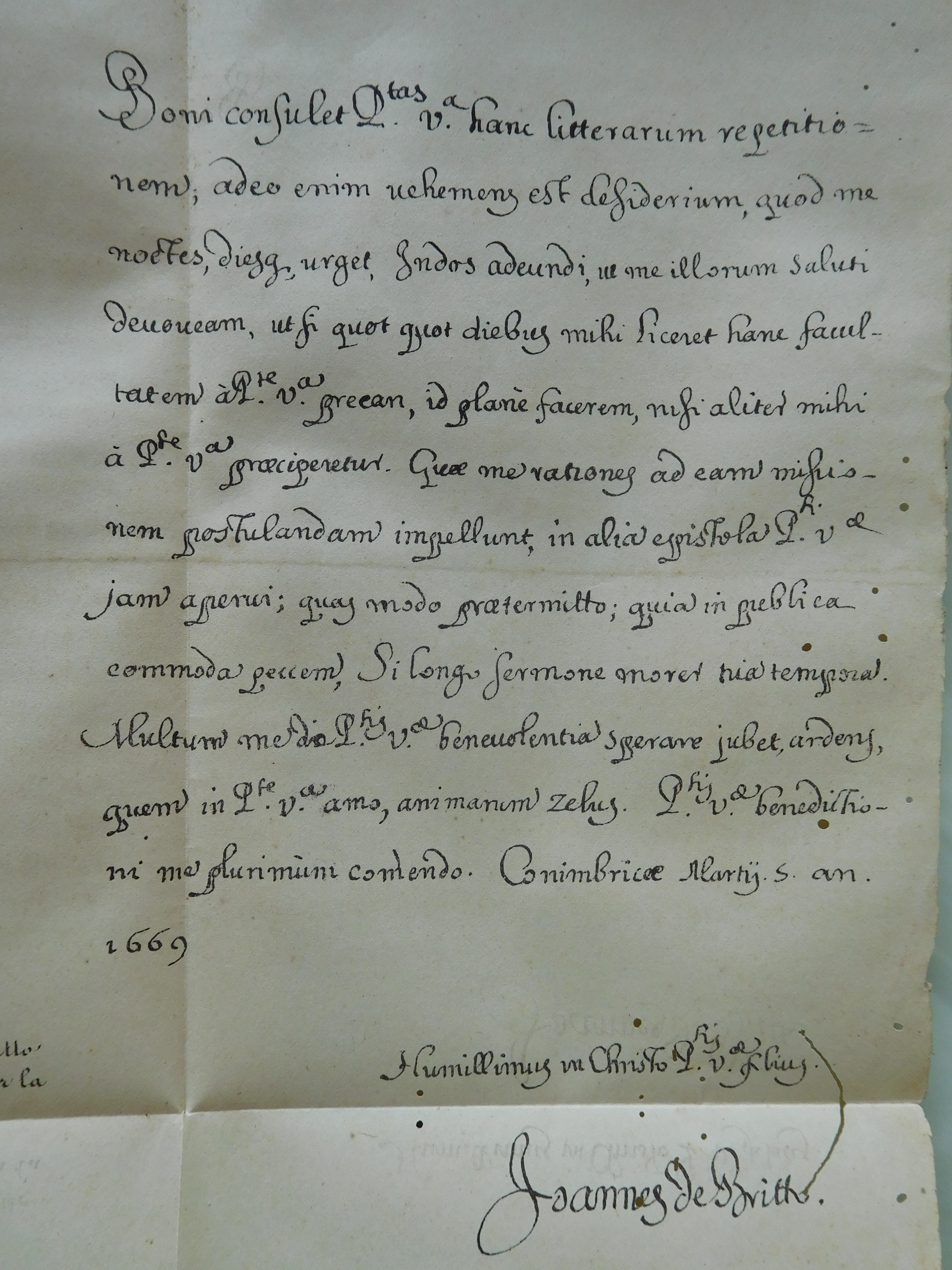
Letter of John de Britto requesting to be sent to the Missions

The red sand dune where the blood of Britto was spilled has great significance. Numerous incurable diseases are said to have cured by the application of the red sand on the respective body parts. Couples are believed to have been blessed with children on visiting the shrine and praying to the departed soul. During festivities, pilgrims mainly from Tamil Nadu and Kerala participate irrespective of their caste, creed and religion. Thus, together with Christians, Hindus and Muslims also come to worship at the shrine in thousands, to mark respect to a unique holy man who shed his life at that spot. The occasion appears to be more of a social gathering rather than a religious festival. The auspicious ceremony is an opportunity for people to bring gaiety and enthusiasm. The combination of pleasure and righteousness on the pilgrimage is said to give a divine atmosphere to the Orur festival.

Devotees from other dioceses and districts visit the shrine on specific dates. In February, believers from Dindigul arrive while in June, they are from Karunguli and Nagapattinam. During September more than 25,000 pilgrims used to visit the shrine for dedicating prayers and offerings. In October, nearly 25,000 pilgrims arrive from the neighbouring Sivagangai district and in December, visitors are from Madurai and Melur. Throughout the year, thousands of pilgrims from Sakthikulangara, a Catholic parish in Kerala, visit the shrine.

== Legacy ==
=== In Portugal ===
His name was given to the Jesuit-run St. John de Britto College, located in Lisbon, Portugal.

=== In India ===
The Basilica of St. John de Britto is in the village of Orur (also spelled Oreiour), where he is a significant figure revered by the Kallar, Maravar and Agamudayar.

There is only one church in Coimbatore dedicated to John de Britto and located at R S Puram, and it is one of the largest parishes in the diocese of Coimbatore. There is also a church in Subramaniapuram in Tiruchirapalli district of Tamil Nadu dedicated to him. In 2016, a Church was built in honour of St. John de Britto at Laggere, Bangalore (Karnataka). There is also a Church dedicated John de Britto in Sesurajapuram, Krishnagiri district of Tamil Nadu.

One of the four houses in the Jesuit school, St Xavier's, Durgapur, is named after John de Britto. In the Campion School of Mumbai and St Xavier's Hazaribag there is a house named after Britto (Britto House). The other two houses are named for Francis Xavier (Xavier House) and Ignatius of Loyola (Loyola House). One of four houses in the Jesuit school, St Stanislaus High School. The other three houses named after Francis Xavier (Xavier House), Ignatius of Loyola (Loyola House) and Stanislaus Kostka (Kostka House). Also one of the four houses in St. Xavier's School, Kolkata, is named after Britto.

One of the four houses in the Infant Jesus Anglo-Indian Higher Secondary School Tangasseri, Kollam is named after John de Britto (Brittos). The other three houses are named for John Bosco (Boscos), John Berchmans (Berchmans) and Dominic Savio (Savios). Campion Anglo Indian Higher Secondary school Tiruchirapalli which is one of the prestigious schools in Tiruchirapalli district of Tamil Nadu also has a house named after him.

St Britto High School in Goa is named after Britto as he lived there for seven months to complete his theological studies at St Paul's College in Old Goa. The school is administered by the Jesuits. There is an Anglo-Indian Boys High School in the Kochi Diocese, in the old Portuguese city of Fort Cochin, named after John de Britto, nearby the Bishop's House, in Kochi. There is a St. John De Britto College of Education at Thanjavur, Tamil Nadu (B.Ed. and M.Ed. college) since Britto worked in the Diocese of Thanjavur as well.

Britto is the patron saint (referred as Pathukavul) of Sakthikulangara Parish in Kollam Diocese, Kerala. Every year, Britto's feast day is celebrated in Sakthikulangara with a big procession (pradakshinam). The St John De Britto Anglo-Indian High School is named after him. One of the Jesuit colleges established in Tamil Nadu is named after Britto as Arul Anandar College (Arts & Science) which is in Karumathur, Madurai, as well as St. Arul Anandar School, Orur, in the town where Britto died. These last two schools were established by the Jesuits to promote education in the rural parts of Tamil Nadu.

=== Other countries ===
In the Philippines, Britto is honoured with several class sections named after him in the Jesuit-run schools:

- Section 11-De Brito in Ateneo de Manila Senior High School
- Four junior high school class sections in Ateneo de Davao University (7-De Brito; 8-De Brito; 9-De Brito; 10-De Brito)
- A Grade 8 level (formerly Grade 9 but changed into a Grade 8 section) class section in Xavier University – Ateneo de Cagayan

In Yogyakarta, Indonesia, a Jesuit school for boys is named after him, SMA Kolese De Britto (De Britto College Senior High School).

In Penang, Malaysia, there is a church called Church of St John Britto. The church is part of City Parish in the city of Georgetown, Penang. It was built in 1969. On 3 February 2019, the city parish held a Golden Jubilee celebration.

In Mauritius there is a chapel named St Jean de Britto dedicated to Tamil Catholics living in the area.

In Brazil there is a São João de Brito Parish in the Roman Catholic Diocese of Santo Amaro, one of the dioceses in the city of São Paulo. The parish was founded on 30 December 1952 and remains as one of the churches among the Pastoral Sector of Saint Amaro in the diocese.

== See also ==
- List of Christian martyrs
- List of saints of the Society of Jesus
- List of vegans
- Madurai Nayak Dynasty

== Bibliography ==
- Beauvais, Gilles-François de (1746). La vie du venerable pere Jean de Britto, de la Compagnie de Jesus, Mis a mort aux Indes dans le Maduré, en haine de la Foi (includes online preview) (in French). Paris: Henri-Simon-Pierre Gissey and Marc Bordelet. OCLC 718297640.
- Beauvais, Gilles-François de (1851). The life of the venerable servant of God, John de Britto, S. J. translated from the french of Father de Beauvais, S. J. 1746. London: Thomas Richardson and Son. OCLC 557619949.
