= Gilles-François de Beauvais =

French Jesuit writer and preacher

- Born: Gilles-François de Beauvais; July 7, 1693; Le Mans, Paris
- Died: 1773 (aged 79–80); Paris, Paris
- Occupations: writer and preacher
- Writing career
- Language: French

Gilles-François de Beauvais (7 July 1693 – c. 1773) was a French Jesuit writer and preacher.

Born at Le Mans, France, de Beauvais entered the Society of Jesus in 1709, and taught belles-lettres, rhetoric, and philosophy. After ordination he was assigned to preach and give the Advent course at Court in 1744, during which year he published his Life of Ignatius Azevedo modelled on the original 1743 Italian biography by Giulio Cesare Cordara. De Beauvais dedicated his version to King Stanislans of Poland. The work is devoted to the life of the martyr Ignatius de Azevedo from Porto (1528-1570), who worked in Brazil as Visitor for the Jesuit Order. On 15 July 1570, he was killed near the Canary Islands together with his 39 companions at sea by French Calvinist pirates. In 1854, these "40 martyrs of Brazil" were canonized.

He also wrote a number of other works of devotion and for spiritual reading.

In 1759, he was confessor of Louise de France. De Beauvais probably died in Paris in 1773.
