= Akshay Batra =

Indian entrepreneur, trichologist and author

- Born: India
- Education: Trichology (L.T.T.S.) from The Trichological Society, London
- Occupations: Vice Chairman, Dr Batra's Healthcare
- Known for: Dr Batra's Healthcare

Dr. Akshay Batra is an Indian entrepreneur, trichologist, and author. He is the vice chairman and Managing Director (MD) at Dr Batra's Healthcare and the author of Hair: Everything You Ever Wanted to Know, published by Embassy Books in three languages. Batra is the president of Trichological Society, London and is the first Indian to be elected for this position. He is also the trustee for Dr Batra's Foundation.

== Critical reception ==
Anurag Mishra at Jagran reviewed the book and wrote "Thus book is one-stop way to make informed decision about your hair. None of the previous books on hair link hair with Ancient Greek and Roman civilizations, like this book does". Pioneer discussed that book was relevant for anyone who has interest in healthy hair but at the same time, it could have benefitted from simplifying medical terms for lay people. Concurrently Victor Dasgupta at India.com wrote "It’s a well-researched blend of medical advice and practical tips, making it a worthwhile read." Himanshu Jha at Hindustan newspaper remarked that despite its shortcomings, the insights and intellectual depth is the strength of the book.
