= Mukesh Batra =

Homeopathy practitioner

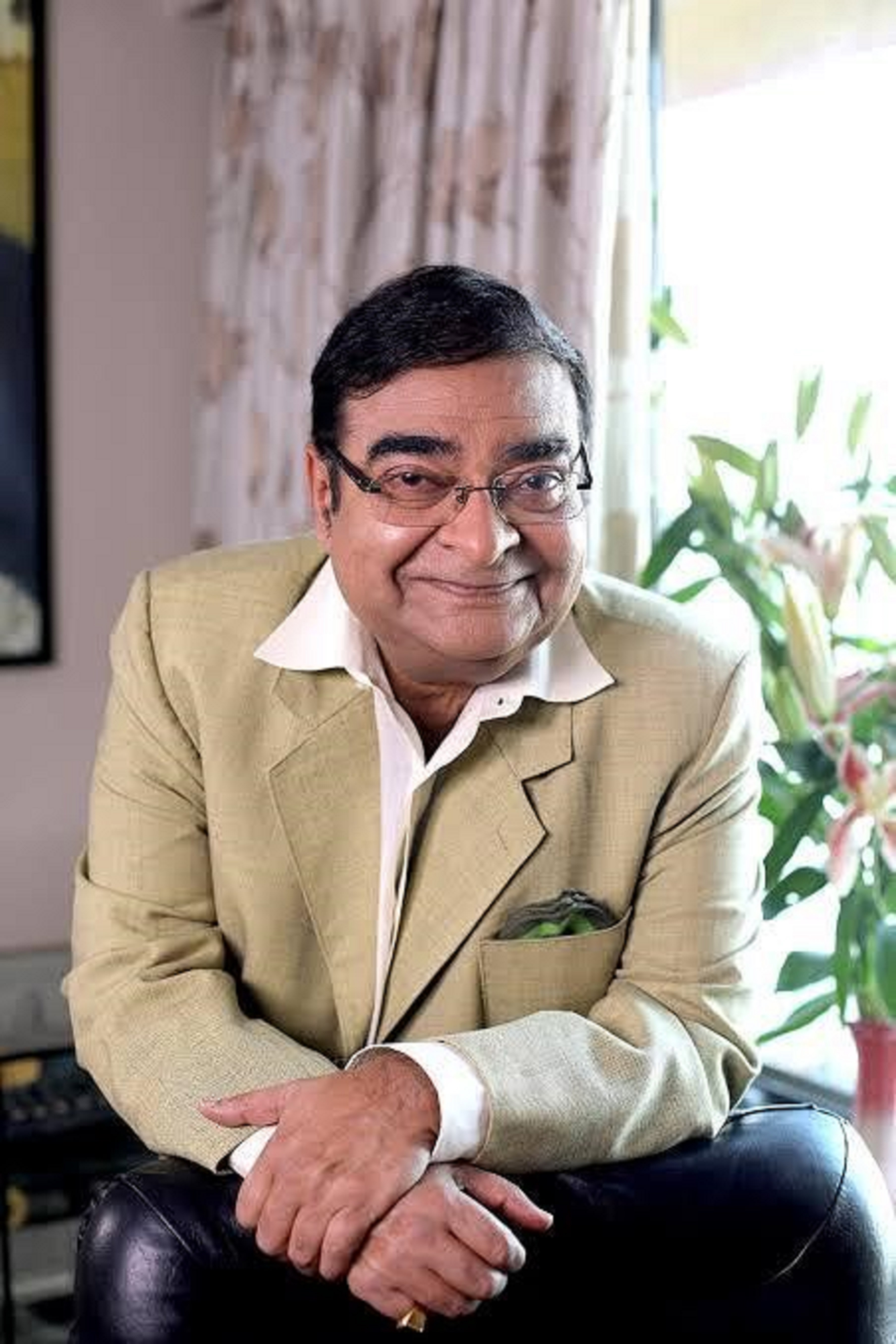
- Born: 1 July 1951 (age 74); Bombay, Bombay State, India
- Occupation: Homeopathy practitioner
- Website: drbatras.com

Mukesh Batra (born 1 July 1951) is the founder of Dr Batra's group of companies, a chain of homeopathy clinics in 6 countries and an FMCG brand. He is a first generation entrepreneur, the author of books on homeopathy, and writer of health columns in publications such as The Times of India. He was awarded the Padma Shri award for homeopathic medicine in 2012. Batra is known for using modern technology to bring standardization to "homeopathic healthcare solutions". He is regarded by some as the pioneer of modern homeopathy in India. He also introduced the blister-packaging of homeopathic remedies.

Dr Batra's was mentioned in the Limca Book of Records (Editions 2004 and 2005) for becoming the first cyber clinic to offer online consultation to over 450 thousand patients every year. Batra studied at the Campion School in Mumbai and later at Jai Hind College. At the age of 60, he enrolled at Harvard University for a management course in best practices in healthcare. He established the Dr Batra's Positive Health Foundation in 2001.

== Early life and education ==
Both of Batra's parents were doctors. His mother was an allopath and his father was a homeopath. Batra was born in Lucknow. He lived in Agra before moving to Mumbai later. He went on to earn his homeopathy degree from the Bombay Homeopathic Medical College (Smt. Chandaben Mohanbhai Patel Homeopathic Medical College) in 1972.

== Career ==
Batra started his career in 1974 at a charitable homeopathy clinic in Malabar Hill.

Batra later decided to initiate a private practice in a polyclinic that was near. After two years, Batra started his own clinic- known as Positive Health clinic in the Chowpatty area in South Mumbai with a bank loan at an exorbitant 36% interest in 1982. In 1996, he set up the first International clinic in Mauritius. In Mauritius, he worked at legislating for the system of homeopathy and Dr Batra’s clinic is the first and one of the recognized homeopathic clinics in the country. In the Middle East, he introduced homeopathy in countries that prohibit use of alcohol-based medicines on religious grounds. In 2018, Batra spoke about a new line of treatment called ‘Geno Homeopathy’ which is claimed to be a combination of genetics and homeopathy.

Hundreds of clinics are opened in India. Batra's Homeopathic Clinic (FZ-LLC) is present at the Dubai Healthcare City in Dubai followed by another clinic in Jumeirah Lake Towers. Other than Dubai, the clinics are available in Abu Dhabi, London, Dhaka.

== Philanthropy ==
Batra's company sponsors the annual Dr Batra's Positive Health Awards to honor people who fight against disease and disability and he donates the proceeds of his annual photography exhibit for charitable causes. Batra has over 160 free clinics across India for homeopathy and provides free treatment to their partnered NGO's - Victoria Memorial School for the Blind, Shepherd Widows Home, Mercy Old Age Home, Sandhya Home for the Aged, Little Sisters of Poor (located in Hyderabad, Bangalore and Chennai), Ek Prayaas and Kartar Aasra Home through its CSR initiative called Dr Batra's Foundation.

== Awards and recognition ==
- Person of the Year in healthcare at the World Today Business Conclave 2016
- Lifetime Achievement Award for his service in homeopathy by World Medical Council (2014)
- 1st Sheikh Zayed International Awards For TCAM 2020 ceremony
