= Orur =

Orur Oriyur
- village
- Interactive map of Orur
- Coordinates: 9.840189°N 79.055647°E
- Country: India
- State: Tamil Nadu
- District: Ramanathapuram

Languages
  - Official: Tamil
- Time zone: UTC+5:30 (IST)
- Nearest city: Devakottai

Orur (sometimes spelled Oriyur or Oreiour) is a small village located in Tiruvadanai taluk, Ramanathapuram district, Tamil Nadu, India. It is situated 35 km from Devakottai, Sivagangai. As of the 2011 Census of India, the village had a population of 5,065 across 1,171 households. There were 2,470 males and 2,595 females.

The Christian saint John de Britto, a Portuguese Jesuit known as Arulanandar in Tamil, was martyred at Orur in 1693. There is a shrine to Britto in the village, where he is a significant figure revered by the Kallar, Maravar and Agamudayar castes.

== St. Arul Anandar School ==
St. Arulanandar Higher secondary School, Oriyur

Location
- Oriyur, Ramanathapuram, Tamil Nadu; India; 9°51′3.79″N 79°3′3.1″E

Information
- Type: Private secondary school
- Religious affiliation: Catholicism
- Denomination: Jesuit
- Established: 1908; 118 years ago
- Headmaster: Fr Jerome S.J.
- Grades: 6-12
- Gender: Co-educational
- Language: Tami & English
- Affiliation: Continuous and Comprehensive Evaluation
- Website: https://www.mdusj.org/index.php/st-arul-anandar-h-s-school-oriyur

St. Arul Anandar School, Oriyur is a private Catholic secondary school located in the village. Founded by the Jesuits in 1908, the school educates students from grade 6 through to grade 12. The medium of instruction is Tamil.
