= Dr Batra's Healthcare =

- Company type: Private
- Industry: Skin care, Hair care, Women's health, Respiratory disease
- Founded: 1982; 44 years ago
- Founder: Mukesh Batra
- Headquarters: Mumbai, Maharashtra, India
- Area served: India; UAE; United Kingdom
- Key people: Mukesh Batra; Akshay Batra
- Services: Skin care, Hair care, Pediatrics, Hair loss, Alopecia areata
- Parent: Dr Batra's group of companies
- Website: www.drbatras.com

Dr Batra's Healthcare is an Indian Homeopathy healthcare private held company. Dr. Mukesh Batra set up the organization in 1982 with the first homeopathy clinic at Chowpatty in Mumbai. The company started as a homeopathy clinic and later got into hair and skin-related services in 2009. Weight Management and Respiratory ailments segments were also later added.

The company has its presence in 5 countries including India, UK, UAE, Bahrain, and Dhaka with approximately 150 clinics. Dr Batra's Healthcare consists of their own clinics, franchises and clinic in clinic model. The company introduced the concept of Gene Targeted Homeopathy in 2018. Dr Batra's healthcare also has business interests in pet care, media and education. The organization is looking forward to diversifying its FMCG portfolio, covering haircare, skincare and personal care products. Dr Batra's also has an in-house an academy, providing fellowship course in Homeopathic Dermatology to those doctors who would be eligible for the program.

== Philanthropy ==
The Dr Batra's Positive Health Foundation was founded in 2001. Under this foundation, the organization runs 168 free clinics to the underprivileged. The Foundation also works in the domain of nutrition with the Annamitra program. Another initiative called Feed a Child served more than in 2017.

== Awards/Recognition ==
Limca Book of Records identified Dr Batra's cyber clinic for working with 4.5 Lakh patients each year in their 2004-2005 editions.
