= Oriyur =

Coordinates: 10°59′58″N 79°12′49″E

- village
- Interactive map of Oriyur
- Country: India
- State: Tamil Nadu
- District: Ariyalur

Languages
  - Official: Tamil
- Time zone: UTC+5:30 (IST)
- Nearest city: Devakottai

Oriyur is a small village in Ariyalur taluk, Ariyalur district, Tamil Nadu, India. As of the 2011 Census of India, the village had a population of 1,703 across 464 households. There were 868 males and 838 females.
