= Duraisamy Simon Lourdusamy =

Catholic cardinal

His Eminence Duraisamy Simon Lourdusamy
- Prefect Emeritus of the Congregation for the Oriental Churches
- Appointed: 30 October 1985
- Term ended: 24 May 1991
- Predecessor: Wladyslaw Rubin
- Successor: Achille Silvestrini
- Other post: Cardinal-Priest of Santa Maria delle Grazie alle Fornaci fuori Porta Cavalleggeri
- Previous posts: Titular Bishop of Sozusa in Libya (1962–1964); Auxiliary Bishop of Bangalore (1962–1964); Titular Archbishop of Philippi (1964–1968); Coadjutor Archbishop of Bangalore (1964–1968); Archbishop of Bangalore (1968–1971); Secretary of Congregation for the Propagation of the Faith (1973–1985); Cardinal-Deacon of S. Maria delle Grazie alle Fornaci fuori Porta Cavalleggeri (1985–1996); Protodeacon of College of Cardinals (1993–1996)

Orders
- Ordination: 21 December 1951 by Auguste-Siméon Colas
- Consecration: 22 August 1962 by Ambrose Rayappan
- Created cardinal: 25 May 1985 by John Paul II
- Rank: Cardinal-Priest

Personal details
- Born: 5 February 1924 Kallery, South Arcot District, Madras Presidency, British India (now in Viluppuram District, Tamil Nadu, India)
- Died: 2 June 2014 (aged 90) Rome, Lazio, Italy
- Buried: Immaculate Conception Cathedral, Pondicherry; 11.93299°N 79.83055°E
- Denomination: Catholic
- Education: St. Peter's Pontifical Seminary; Loyola College, Chennai; Pontifical Urbaniana University
- Motto: Aedificare domum Dei; To build the house of God
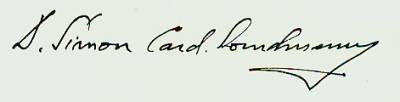
- Signature: Duraisamy Simon Lourdusamy's signature

- Coat of arms: Duraisamy Simon Lourdusamy's coat of arms

Styles of Duraisamy Simon Lourdusamy
- Reference style: His Eminence
- Spoken style: Your Eminence
- Informal style: Cardinal
- See: Santa Maria delle Grazie alle Fornaci fuori Porta Cavalleggeri

Duraisamy Simon Lourdusamy (5 February 1924 – 2 June 2014) was an Indian cardinal of the Catholic Church. He was the Prefect of the Congregation for the Oriental Churches in the Roman Curia and was elevated to the cardinalate in 1985. His episcopical motto was Aedificare domum Dei which means "To build the house of God". He was the fourth cardinal from India and the first curial cardinal of Asia outside of the Middle East.

== Biography ==
Lourdusamy was born in Kalleri (Note: ecclesiastically comes under Archdiocese of Pondicherry) (a village near Gingee in present-day Viluppuram district, Tamil Nadu, India). He was the seventh of twelve children of Annamarie (aka Matharasi) and Duraisamy Simeon. Lourdusamy was the elder brother of priest and theologian D. S. Amalorpavadass, who was killed in an automobile accident while travelling from Mysore to Bangalore. The two of them played a significant part in the implementation of Vatican II Council reforms in India and leading others to do the same.

He enjoyed a close relationship with Pope John XXIII, Pope Paul VI, Pope John Paul I, and most especially, with Pope John Paul II and his fellow curial cardinal Joseph Ratzinger and future Pope Benedict XVI. John XXIII elevated him to the episcopal ranks and appointed him to the See of Bangalore, Pope Paul VI invited him to Rome to serve the Universal Church from 1971. Cardinal Lourdusamy also worked with Pope John Paul I as Secretary of the Congregation for Evangelization of Peoples. The Cardinal worked very closely with John Paul II for 26 years in various capacities, and he served as Prefect of the Oriental Churches alongside Cardinal Ratzinger (later Pope Benedict XVI) who was the Prefect of the Congregation for Doctrine of Faith.

He had his early education at St. Ann's in Tindivanam. Then he finished his high school studies at St. Joseph Higher School of Cuddalore; then he entered St. Agnes's Minor Seminary in Cuddalore, and completed major seminary education in Philosophy and Theology at St. Peter's Pontifical Seminary, Bangalore from 1946 to 1951.

He was ordained to the priesthood on 21 December 1951 at Seven Dolours Church, Tindivanam, Pondicherry by Archbishop Auguste-Siméon Colas, MEP, the Archbishop of Pondicherry and Cuddalore. 1951–1952, pastoral ministry in the archdiocese of Pondicherry.

After studying further at Loyola College in Madras (1952–1953), he was sent to Rome to pursue higher studies in the area of Canon Law at the Pontifical Urbaniana University (1953–1956), from where he obtained a doctorate. He obtained 100% in all of his exams in canon law studies, something which had never occurred in other Roman universities. He played the piano, and has composed the music for devotional songs.

On returning to the Archdiocese of Pondicherry and Cuddalore, Fr. Lourdusamy served as Archdiocesan Chancellor and private secretary to Archbishop Ambrose Rayappan, as editor of the archdiocesan weekly "Sarva viyabhi" (சர்வ வியாபி), and was choirmaster at the Cathedral in Pondicherry, Director of the Catholic Doctors' Guild, Director of the Catholic Nurses' Guild, Director of the Newman Association, and Director of the Catholic University Students Union.

=== Bishop ===
Pope John XXIII appointed Fr. Lourdusamy Auxiliary Bishop of Bangalore and Titular Bishop of Sozusa in Libya on 2 July 1962, at the age of 38. He was consecrated as a bishop on the following 22 August by Archbishop Ambrose Rayappan, with Bishops Rajarethinam Sundaram (bishop of Tanjore) and Daniel Arulswamy (bishop of Kumbakonam) serving as co-consecrators; Bishop (later Cardinal and Major Archbishop of the Syro Malabar Church) Antony Padiyara of Ooty was also present at the consecration.

Bishop Lourdusamy attended the Second Vatican Council (Sessions 2, 3 and 4 as a "Council Father"). On 9 November 1964, he was promoted to titular archbishop of Filippi and appointed the Coadjutor Archbishop of Bangalore. He attended, the First Ordinary Assembly of the Synod of Bishops, Vatican City, 29 September to 29 October 1967. He was appointed to represent the Indian bishops at the Pan Asiatic Catechetic-Liturgical Conference in Manila in 1967 and was elected the vice-president of the conference and president of its liturgical section. He succeeded Thomas Pothacamury as archbishop on 11 January 1968.

As Archbishop of Bangalore, he served as Chairman of the National Liturgical commission of India, founded the National Biblical, Catechetical and Liturgical Centre in Bangalore, and also played a significant role in the establishment of St.John's Medical College (the first Catholic Medical College in India), also in Bangalore. Prior to the International Eucharistic Congress in Bogota in 1968, he was invited as a panel member of the International Catechetical study week in Medellin, Colombia.

Pope Paul VI appointed him as Secretary adjunct of the S.C. for the Evangelization of Peoples, 2 March 1971. He resigned as Archbishop of Bangalore on 30 April 1971 and left India to serve in the Curial Congregation for the Evangelization of Peoples in March 1971, Secretary of the S.C. for the Evangelization of Peoples, president of the Pontifical Missionary Work and Vice-Grand chancellor of the Pontifical Urbanian University, 26 February 1973, the university at which he was a student from 1953 to 1956. He is the first Asian to become a member of the Roman Curia.

=== Cardinal ===
Pope John Paul II created Lourdusamy Cardinal-Deacon of Santa Maria delle Grazie alle Fornaci fuori Porta Cavalleggeri in the consistory of 25 May 1985; he is the first Tamil to be raised to the rank of cardinal. Cardinal Lourdusamy was named Prefect of the Congregation for the Oriental Churches on the following 30 October.

Attended the Second Extraordinary Assembly of the Synod of Bishops, Vatican City, 24 November to 8 December 1985, and the Seventh on 1 to 30 October 1987. Special papal envoy to the closing ceremonies of the Year of St. Willibrord, Luxemburg, 3 to 5 June 1990. Attended the Eighth Ordinary Assembly of the Synod of Bishops, Vatican City, 30 September to 28 October 1990.

He became Cardinal Protodeacon (the senior Cardinal-Deacon) on 5 April 1993, and served as a special papal legate to the funeral of Mother Teresa on 13 September 1997. On 5 April 1993 was appointed protodeacon. He chose to become a Cardinal-Priest on 29 January 1996 thereby relinquishing protodeacon post.

24 September 2002 In Ordinary Session, the Cardinals and Bishops of the Congregation for the Causes of Saints (CCS), after hearing the report of Simon Cardinal Lourdusamy, the Proposer [Ponens] of the Cause, unanimously recognise that the Servant of God Mother Teresa of Calcutta practised the theological, cardinal and other annexed virtues to a heroic decree.

— The history of the cause of Mother Teresa's cause for Sainthood

Cardinal Lourdusamy accompanied John Paul II on his Apostolic travels to Africa, Asia, Oceania, and The Americas. He also visited 110 countries on all continents in the service of Popes John XXIII, Paul VI, John Paul I, and John Paul II, and received numerous distinctions in appreciation of his work. Cardinal Lourdusamy was fluent in several languages including Tamil, Latin, English, Italian, French, German, Kannada, Spanish, Portuguese, Dutch and Swedish.

Pope John Paul II appointed Cardinal Lourdusamy a member of the following Departments of the Roman Curia, in addition to Prefect, Congregation for Oriental Churches:

- Congregation for the Doctrine of the Faith
- Congregation for the Causes of Saints
- Congregation for the Evangelization of Peoples
- Congregation for Catholic Education
- Supreme Tribunal of the Apostolic Signatura
- Pontifical Council for Promoting Christian Unity
- Pontifical Council for the Family
- Pontifical Council for Inter-Religious Dialogue
- Pontifical Council for Interpretation of Legislative Texts
- Pontifical Commission for International Eucharistic Congresses
- Pontifical Commission for the Revision of the Code of the Oriental Canon Law
- Pontifical Commission for the Revision of the Code of Canon Law
- Pontifical Commission for Latin America
- Pontifical Commission for the Pastoral Care of Migrants and Itinerant People
- The Commission of Cardinals and Bishops set up by the Pope to prepare a Catechism for the Church Universal
- The Commission for the Study of the Theological and Juridical Status of the Bishops' Conferences
- The Permanent Interdicastrial Commission for the Formation of the Candidates to the Sacred Orders

=== International recognition ===
Lourdusamy was honoured by the Governments of Philippines, Republic of China – Taiwan (The Order of the Brilliant Star, First Class – 13 November 1983), France (Commander of the Légion d'honneur – 29 December 1976), and Germany (Das Grosse Verdienstkreuz mit Stern – 10 October 1977), Liberia (Grand Commander of the Order of the Star of Africa – 3 November 1977), Luxembourg (The "Grand-Croix de l'Ordre Grand-Ducal de la Couronne de Chêne" – 29 June 1988).

He was also awarded a doctorate of laws – "Honoris Causa" (5 February 1979) by Adamson University, Manila, Philippines and a doctorate of letters – "Honoris Causa" (25 May 1989) by Pondicherry University, India.

=== Death ===
Tomb of Cardinal Lourdusamy

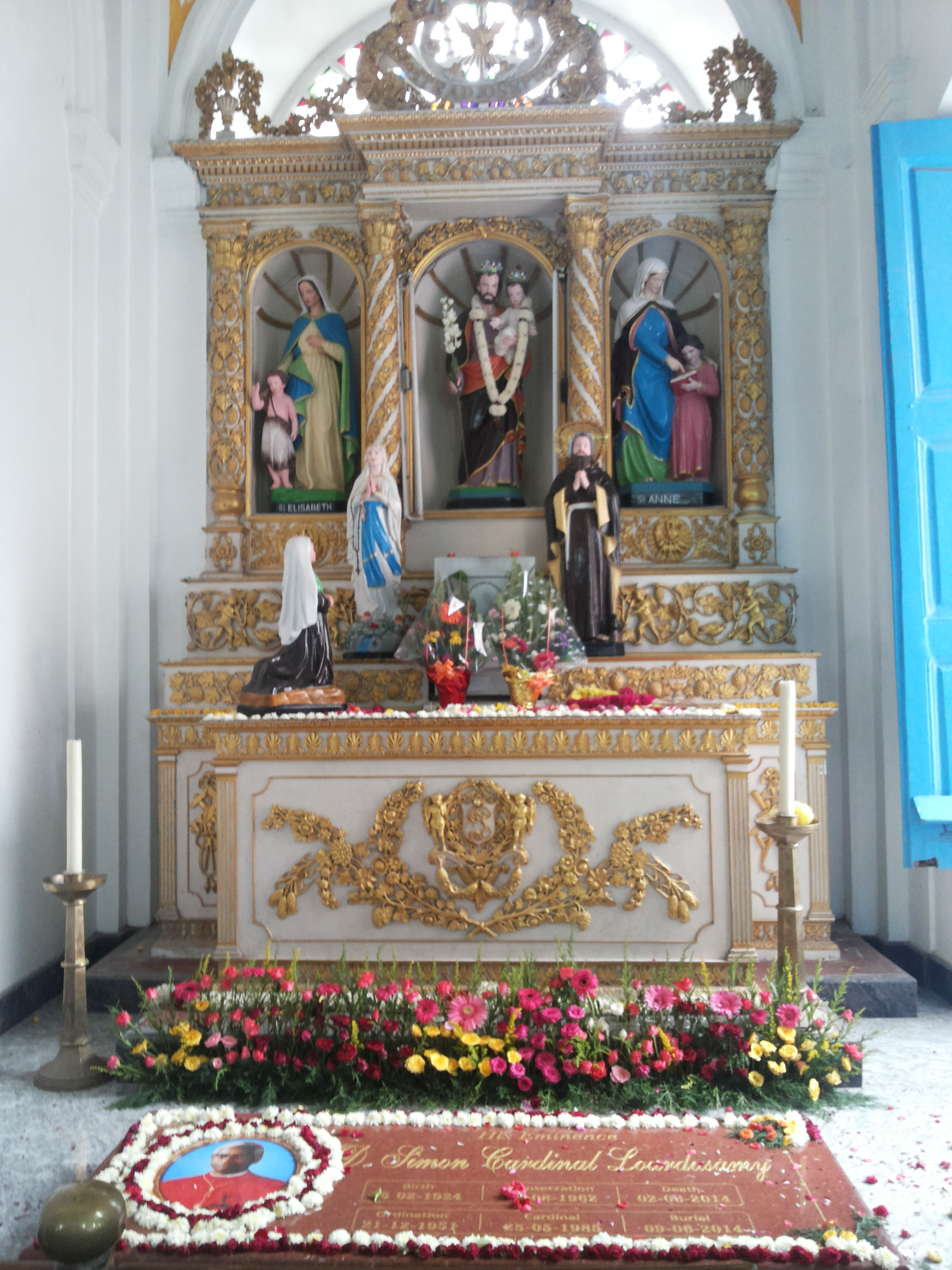
The tomb is in front of St. Joseph's Altar at Pondicherry Cathedral

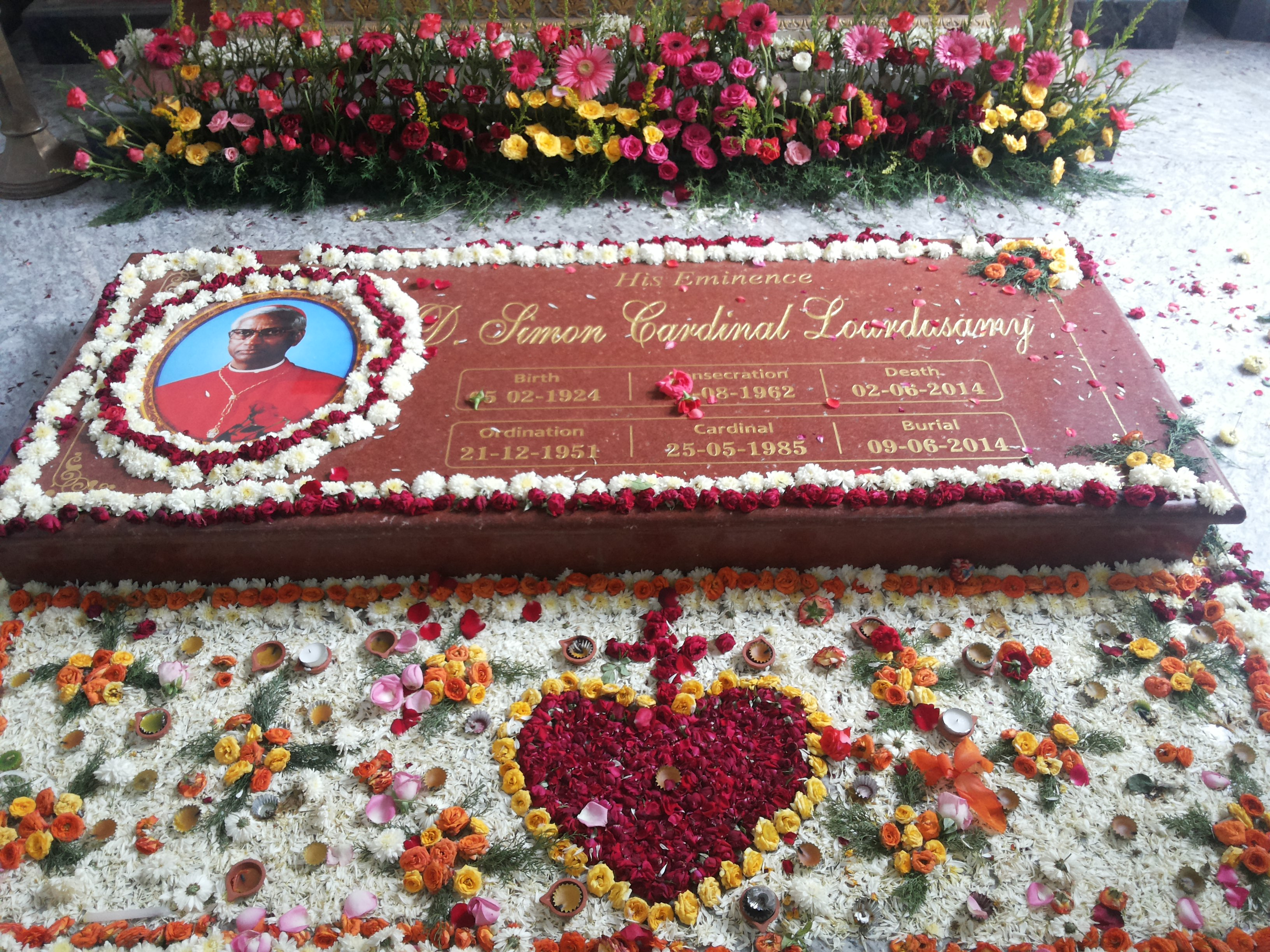
Closer view

Cardinal Lourdusamy died at Casa di cura Pio XI nursing home in Rome on 2 June 2014.

A funeral Mass was celebrated for the Cardinal on Thursday, 5 June 2014, with Angelo Cardinal Sodano, Dean of the College of Cardinals, presiding. At the end of the service, Pope Francis led the Rites of Final Commendation and Valediction. His nephew Vincent and Sr. Vellie Fernandez, Sr. Avis Aguiar who cared for him were with him on his 90th birthday four months earlier, again during his final days in the hospital, and accompanied his mortal remains to Pondicherry, India on 6 June 2014. Cardinal lay in state at Escande's Hall, Petit Seminaire Higher Secondary School, where thousands paid their final respects round the clock, over two days and nights. On 9 June 2014, after a mass of repose, celebrated by the Papal Nuncio for India and Nepal Monsignor Salvatore Pennacchio, the Cardinals, Bishops and hundreds of priests, his remains were entombed in front of St. Joseph's Altar inside Immaculate Conception Cathedral, Pondicherry.

Ordination history of Duraisamy Simon Lourdusamy
History
Priestly ordination
- Ordained by: Auguste-Siméon Colas
- Date: 21 December 1951
Episcopal consecration
- Principal consecrator: Ambrose Rayappan
- Co-consecrators: Rajarethinam Arokiasamy Sundaram Daniel Paul Arulswamy
- Date: 22 August 1962
- Place: Grounds of Petit Seminaire Higher Secondary School
Cardinalate
- Elevated by: Pope John Paul II
- Date: 25 May 1985
Episcopal succession
Bishops consecrated by Duraisamy Simon Lourdusamy as principal consecrator
- Joseph Rajappa: 1967
- Joseph Kelanthara: 1971
- Cornelius Elanjikal: 1971
- Packiam Arokiaswamy: 1971
- William Leonard D'Mello: 1977
- Mathew Cheriankunnel: 1977
- Mariadas Kagithapu: 1977
- John Mulagada: 1977
- Michael Augustine: 1978
- Barthélémy Batantu: 1979
- José Antonio Peteiro Freire: 1983
- Hubert Louis Marie Félix Michon: 1983
- Edward Francis: 1987
- Peter Remigius: 1990
- Gabriel Lawrence Sengol: 1990
- Malayappan Chinnappa: 1994
- Antony Anandarayar: 1997
- Joseph Anthony Irudayaraj: 1997
- Devadass Ambrose Mariadoss: 1997
- Antony Devotta: 2001

== Notes ==
Catholic Church titles
Preceded by Hailé Mariam Cahsai	— TITULAR — Bishop of Sozusa in Libya; 2 July 1962 – 9 November 1964	Succeeded by Guido Attilio Previtali, O.F.M
Preceded by Leone Giovanni Battista Nigris	— TITULAR — Archbishop of Philippi; 9 November 1964 – 11 January 1968	Vacant
Preceded by Thomas Pothacamury	Archbishop of Bangalore; 11 January 1968 – 30 April 1971	Succeeded by Packiam Arokiaswamy
Preceded by Bernardin Gantin	Secretary of Congregation for the Propagation of the Faith; 19 December 1975 – 30 October 1985	Succeeded by José Tomás Sánchez
Preceded by Władysław Rubin	Prefect of Congregation for the Oriental Churches; 30 October 1985 – 24 May 1991	Succeeded by Achille Silvestrini
Preceded by Aurelio Sabattani	Cardinal Protodeacon; 5 April 1993 – 29 January 1996	Succeeded by Eduardo Martínez Somalo
