= Auguste-Siméon Colas =

French missionary and bishop

The Most Reverend Auguste-Siméon Colas M.E.P.
- Archbishop Emeritus of Pondicherry and Cuddalore
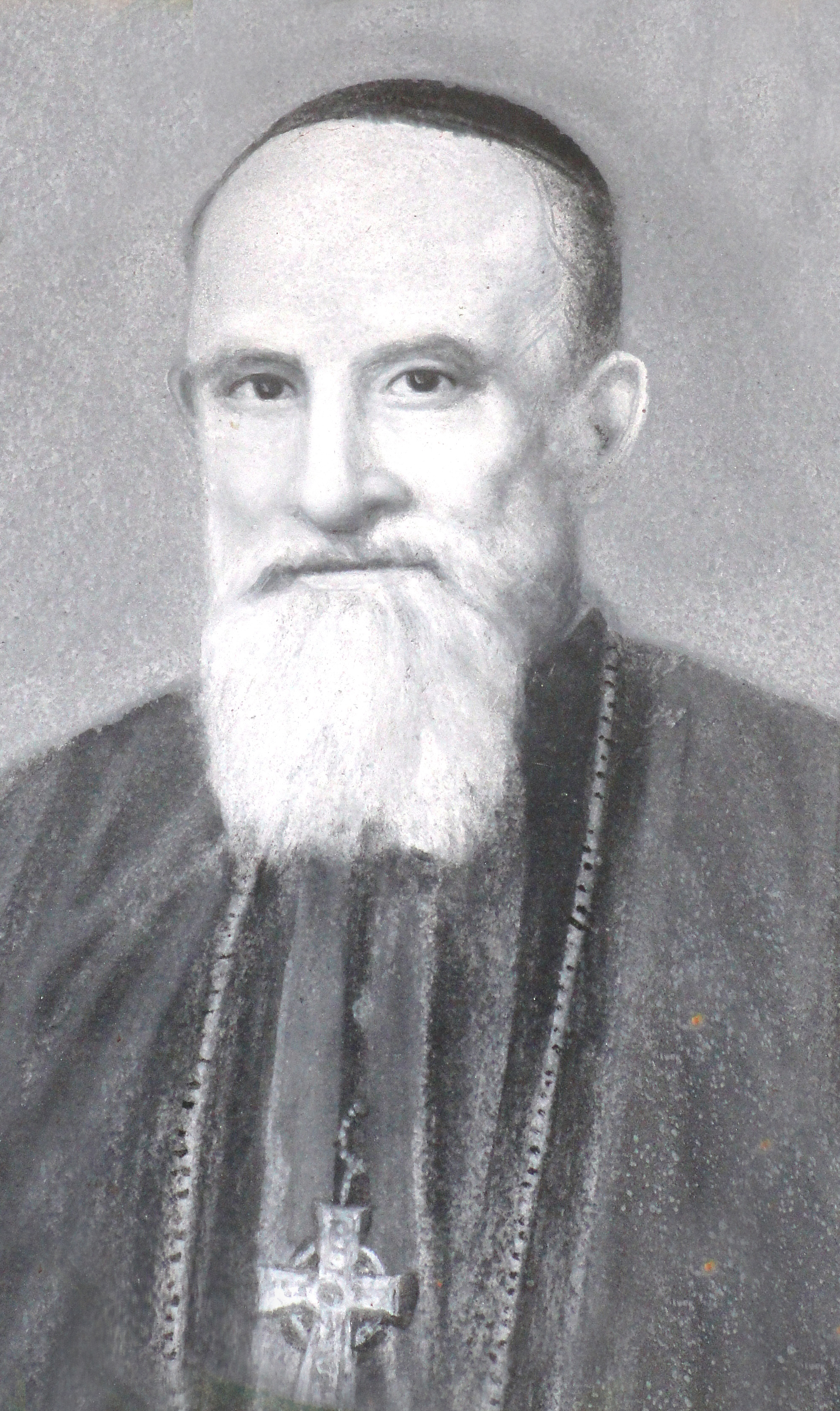
- Archbishop Auguste-Siméon Colas
- See: Archdiocese of Pondicherry
- Appointed: 24 June 1930
- Installed: 29 September 1930
- Term ended: 28 October 1955
- Predecessor: Elie-Jean-Joseph Morel
- Successor: Ambrose Rayappan

Orders
- Ordination: 24 June 1900
- Consecration: 29 September 1930 by Elie-Jean-Joseph Morel

Personal details
- Born: Auguste-Siméon Colas; 29 December 1876 Paris, France
- Died: 24 October 1968 (aged 91) Bangalore
- Buried: Cemetery adjacent to Immaculate Conception Cathedral, Pondicherry
- Denomination: Catholic
- Motto: Credo
- Coat of arms: Auguste-Siméon Colas's coat of arms

Auguste-Siméon Colas M.E.P. (29 December 1876 – 24 October 1968) was a member of Paris Foreign Missions Society and the last missionary archbishop of Archdiocese of Pondicherry. On 29 September 1930, he succeeded Archbishop Elie-Jean-Joseph Morel when the later resigned for health reasons. He was the bishop until 28 October 1955. He was succeeded by Ambrose Rayappan.

== Early life ==
He was born on 29 December 1876 at the parish of Saint-Sulpice, Paris, France. He did his early schooling at Lycée Henri-IV for two years. Then he entered the joint minor Seminary of Notre Dame des Champs. Desiring to become an official in the French army, for his secondary education he entered Lycée privé Sainte-Geneviève under the care of Jesuits. In March 1895, he entered the Saint-Sulpice seminary at Issy-les-Moulineaux. He entered Paris Foreign Missions Society in September 1896. He was ordained priest on 24 June 1900.

== As a missionary priest ==
Prevented from going to Indochina because of unspecified serious events, he was sent to Pondicherry mission. Upon hearing this news, he exclaimed "then the society is afraid to make martyrs." He arrived at Pondicherry on 18 August 1900, and was appointed Professor in seminar-College, under the strict direction of Father Elisabeth. After three years of service there, in August 1903, he was sent to Tindivanam as assistant to Father Combes. In April 1904, he was sent to Chetpet, as vicar of Father Darras. He was parish priest of Chetpet until 1915. This post at Chetpet really was Father Colas's preferred position. During World War I French Mobilization, he had to leave for France in January 1915. He was sent to Salonika. In March 1917, he was demobilised and returned to Pondicherry to regain his post at Chetpet. In 1925, Father Colas was put in charge of the parish at Tindivanam. He was also in-charge of the normal school and the school of catechists at Tindivanam built by Father Gavan Duffy. With financial assistance from Father Gavan Duffy, he managed to finish the beautiful church begun in 1898 by father Combes.

== As a bishop ==
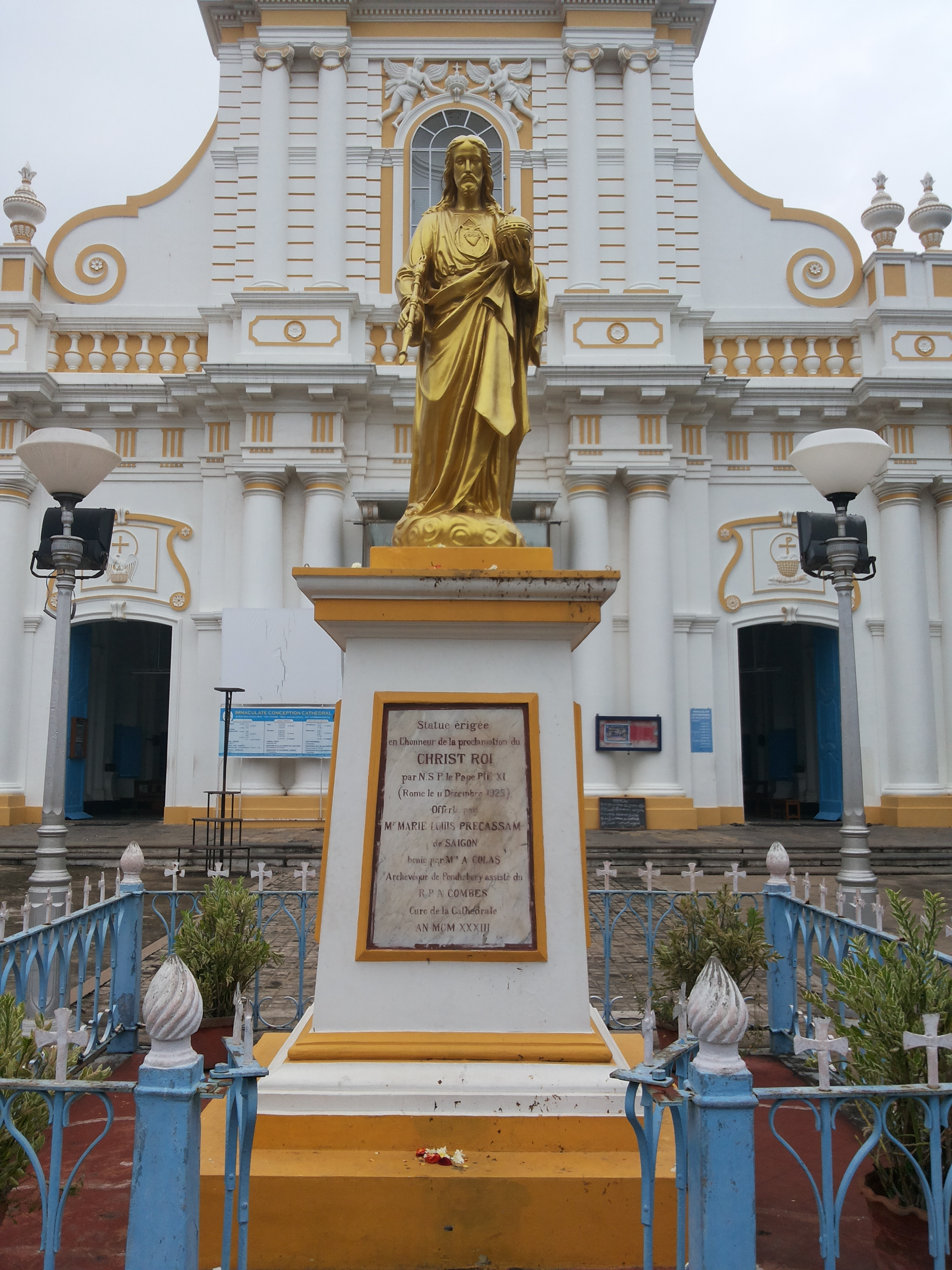
Christ the King statue installed at the Pondicherry Cathedral by Bishop Colas in 1933

Styles of Auguste-Siméon Colas
- Reference style: His Excellency
- Spoken style: Your Excellency
- Religious style: The Most Reverend

In 1930, Fr. Colas was named Archbishop of Pondicherry, succeeding Bishop Elie-Jean-Joseph Morel who gave his resignation for health reasons. The day of his consecration, on 29 September 1930, Msgr. Colas said he had three major works to do: the union between missionaries and the local clergy, the development of schools and catechists, and the increasing vocations of native clergy. During his reign, the number of Indian priests went from 22 to 72 and the number of seminarians from 52 to 76 and the number of nuns grew from 250 in 1930 to 411 in 1955.

During his reign, he consecrated several Indian bishops: Msgr. Oubagarasamy Bernadotte, first bishop of Coimbatore, in 1940. In 1948, Bishop Mark Gopu, who became his assistant and in 1953 was appointed Archbishop of Hyderabad. Archbishop Ambrose Rayappan, priest of the diocese of Coimbatore, was consecrated by Msgr. Colas in 1953 as his coadjutor and became Archbishop of Pondicherry in 1955, when he resigned.

In 1932, he opened a new minor seminary at Cuddalore, which was then the headquarters of South Arcot district in the British territory. He decided to follow the curriculum of studies offered in the British territory. Under his reign in 1934, the seminary at Pondicherry was transferred to Bangalore and named St. Peter's Pontifical Seminary.

When writing the concluding words for Fr. Lafrenez's book on the history of MEP mission in Pondicherry, Archbishop Colas concluded that:

The first aim of the society of Foreign Mission was to build the local Churches in the countries entrusted to it by the Holy See. In India, looking at the Indian Bishops at the head of Bangalore, Coimbatore, Kumbakonam, Salem and most probably very soon in Pondicherry, our Society can confirm that it has fulfilled the intention of its founders.

== Retirement and death ==
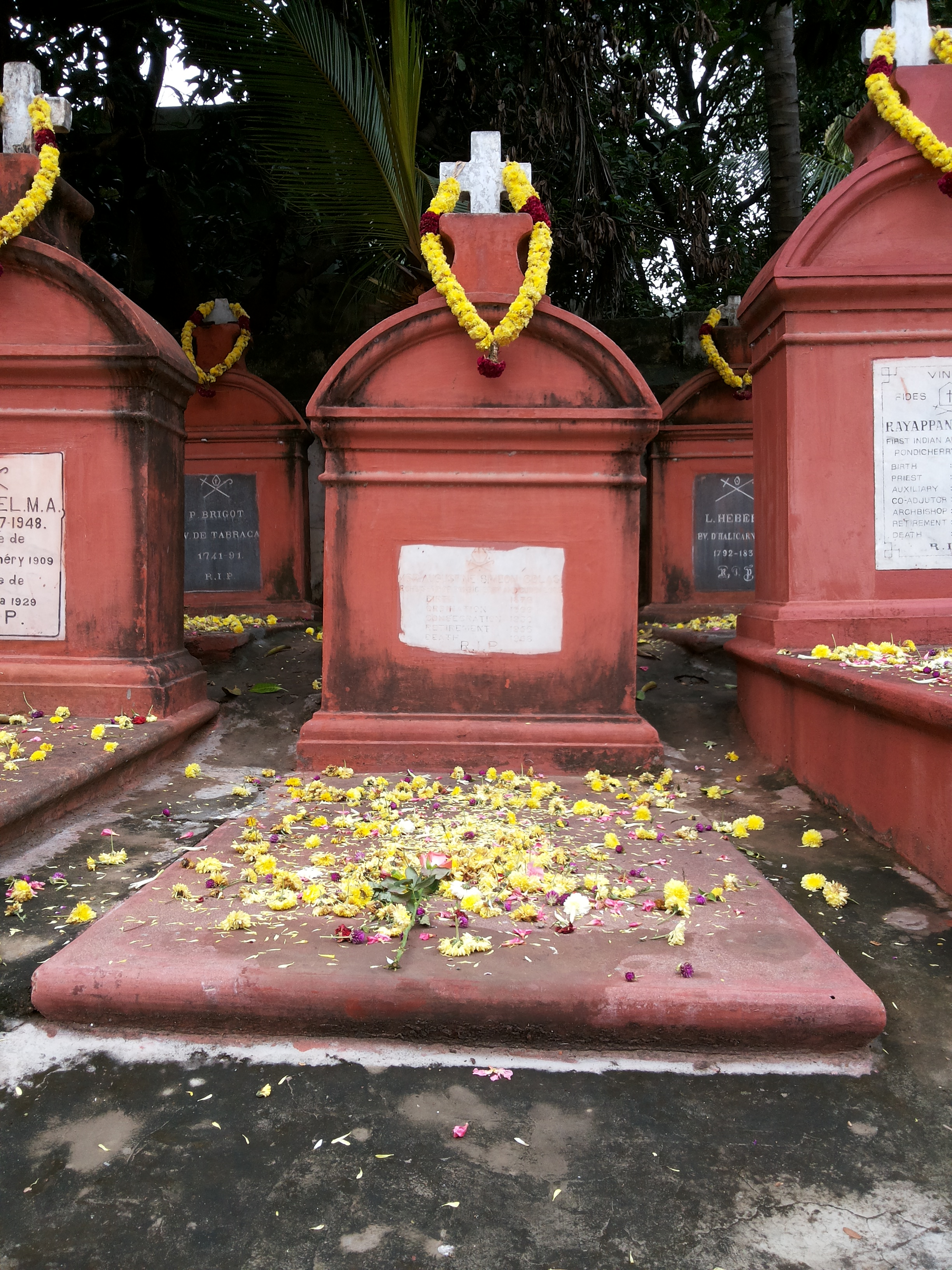
Tomb of Mgr. Auguste-Siméon Colas at the Cathedral Cemetery, Puducherry

After the World War II, India gained its independence on 15 August 1947. Msgr. Colas was in favor of the incorporation of the French territories of Pondicherry to India. In 1955, it was made, and this event had no negative influence for the mission. At that time Msgr. Colas believed it was good to move the diocese to the Indian clergy. He therefore left it to his coadjutor, Bishop Ambrose and went to withdraw at the Pavillon St Augustin's Hospital Ste Marthe in Bangalore. He spent 13 years there. He died at Bangalore on 24 October 1968. His mortal remains were transported to Pondicherry, and the funeral mass was said by nine bishops and archbishops along with the priests of the diocese, and thousands of diocesans. He was buried in the priest's cemetery, adjacent to Immaculate Conception Cathedral, Pondicherry.

Ordination history of Auguste-Siméon Colas
History
Episcopal consecration
- Principal consecrator: Elie-Jean-Joseph Morel
- Co-consecrators: Augustine-Antoine Roy Henri-Aimé-Anatole Prunier
- Date: 29 September 1930
Episcopal succession
Bishops consecrated by Auguste-Siméon Colas as principal consecrator
- Peter Francis Rayappa: 29 June 1931
- Oubagaraswami Bernadotte: 25 July 1940
- Joseph Mark Gopu: 29 September 1948
- Francis Xavier Muthappa: 26 April 1950
- Ambrose Rayappan: 25 March 1953
- Daniel Paul Arulswamy: 21 September 1955

== Awards, honours and namesakes ==
- In 1932 he was made chevalier of the Legion of Honour. He was promoted to officer in 1954.
- A region called Colas Nagar (11.92372°N 79.82652°E) in Puducherry is named after him for the services he rendered for the people of Puducherry.

Catholic Church titles
Preceded by Elie-Jean-Joseph Morel	Archbishop of Pondicherry; 24 June 1930 – 28 October 1955	Succeeded by Ambrose Rayappan
Preceded by Marcel-François Lefebvre	— TITULAR — Archbishop of Arcadiopolis in Europa; 28 October 1955 – 24 October 1968	Vacant
