= Periyanayagi Madha Shrine, Avur =

Periyanayagi Madha Shrine
- Our Lady of Assumption Church
- Periyanayagi Madha Church
- பெரியநாயகி அன்னை ஆலயம்
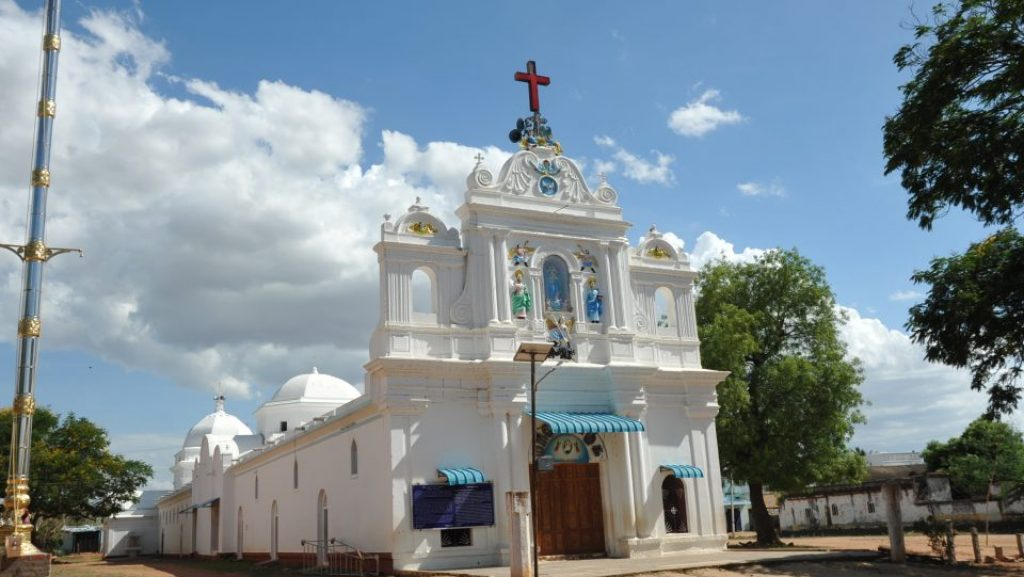
- Side View of the church
- Periyanayagi Madha Shrine
- 10.6596°N 78.6724°E
- Location: Avur, Pudukkottai district, Tamil Nadu
- Country: India
- Denomination: Catholic
- Religious institute: Jesuit

History
- Status: Parish church
- Founded: 1547
- Founder(s): Fr. John Venatius Bachet and Fr. Homem

Architecture
- Functional status: Active
- Architectural type: Church
- Style: Medieval
- Years built: 1747

Administration
- District: Pudukkottai district
- Archdiocese: Pondicherry
- Diocese: Tanjore
- Parish: Pudukkottai

Clergy
- Archbishop: Peter Abir Antonisamy
- Bishop: Sahayaraj Tamburaj

Periyanayagi Madha Shrine is a Roman Catholic church in the village of Avur, 28 kilometres (17 mi) from the town of Pudukkottai in the Indian state of Tamil Nadu. It was constructed by Rev. John Venatius Bachet in 1547. The church was rebuilt in 1747. The renowned Italian missionary and Tamil scholar Joseph Beschi served in this church.

This monument is made up of eight columns raised 56 feet above the ground, and shaped like a cross, measuring 240 feet in length, 38 feet in width, and 28 feet in height.

== History of Avur ==
The Sangam poet Avur Kizhar was born in Avur, at that time it was a village with the Pudukkottai - Tiruchirappalli border.

Apparently, the village is called 'a + oor' ('cow village') because of the large numbers of wild bulls and cows that used to graze in an oorani (drinking water tank) on the outskirts of a jungle here.

== Church and missionary activities ==
Early in the seventeenth century, the Madurai Mission extended its jurisdiction to Tiruchirappalli from Avur, which was sparsely populated in the fifteenth and sixteenth centuries. Later Father Emmanuel Martins chose Avur as a site for his mission. It was granted by the Perambur Kattalur Palayakarars in 1686. Initially the place was under the jurisdiction of the Kolattur Tondaimans, and then later by the Tondaimans as well.

Father Venantius Bouchet, the first missionary at Avur, who joined the Madurai Mission in 1688, aimed to make Avur a Christian centre of considerable importance. The chapel was a special area of inspiration for him. With the contributions from well-wishers and Tondaiman, an impressive chapel much stronger than simply mud walls and thatched roofs had been completed in 1697.

Raghunatha Raya Tondaiman met Bishop of Santhome on his first pastoral trip to Madurai Mission and Avur in 1711, when he visited Avur as the founder of Pudukkottai Tondaimans. A non-Christian king responded with great courtesy to a visiting priest. This is a gesture of great significance for one who does not hold a Christian faith.

== Poignant incident ==
The church's fortunes changed drastically in 1716. The conflict between the Nayak rulers, who allied with Mughals and the Tondaimans caused the foundations of the church to be razed to the ground. The incident is described in the General History of Pudukkottai State. A few soldiers of the Tondaiman had managed to steal some bullocks from the Mughal army not far from Avur. The Mughal became furious, and the missionary was asked to either return the bullocks or to surrender his life.

Rev. Fr. Beschi, the missionary in temporary charge of Avur at the time, had to answer the charge. As he could not get the bullocks back, he quietly accepted the soldiers' alternative proposal. As the infuriated soldiers were unable to hurt their prisoner, they chained him up and led him to their camp amidst insults and threats. When they found that the prisoner bore the treatment with unflinching tranquility, they became so exasperated that they stripped him naked exposed him to the midday sun.

However, as soon as the chief, Chanda Sahib, learned of this, he immediately ordered the prisoner's release. In a tender embrace, the chief asked the missionary to sit at his side; when the missionary protested, the chief explained that his actions had been done without his knowledge. The men, who had insulted the missionary a short time earlier, were moved by the honour shown to him. Indeed, the danger he had incurred led to his safety and to that of the village.

== Festival ==
A Passion play takes place during the Easter season, followed by a car festival in the summer, which attracts people of all faiths.
