= Antony Anandarayar =

Indian Latin Catholic archbishop (1945–2021)

His Grace Antony Anandarayar
- Archbishop Emeritus of Pondicherry and Cuddalore
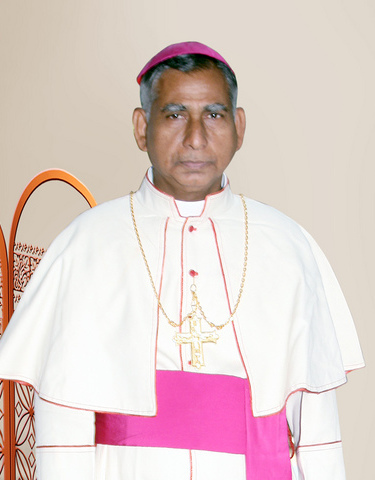
- Diocese: Archdiocese of Pondicherry and Cuddalore
- Installed: 10 July 2004
- Term ended: 27 January 2021
- Predecessor: Michael Augustine
- Successor: Francis Kalist

Orders
- Ordination: 21 December 1971 by Daniel Paul Arulswamy
- Consecration: 29 January 1997 by Duraisamy Simon Cardinal Lourdusamy
- Rank: Archbishop Emeritus

Personal details
- Born: 17 July 1945 Varadarajanpet, Tamil Nadu, India
- Died: 4 May 2021 (aged 75) St.Thomas Hospital, Chennai
- Buried: Cathedral Cemetery, Pondicherry
- Denomination: Catholic Church (Latin Church)
- Residence: Pondicherry
- Parents: Antony & Collet Mary
- Education: St. Peter's Pontifical Seminary
- Motto: Servire in Fide et in Amore
- Coat of arms

Antony Anandarayar (17 July 1945 – 4 May 2021) was an Indian Catholic prelate who served as Archbishop of the Archdiocese of Pondicherry and Cuddalore. His episcopal motto in Latin is Servire in Fide et in Amore, which means To serve with Faith and Love. He died on 4 May 2021.

== Biography ==
He has a doctorate in Missiology and a Doctorate in Canon Law.

He was ordained priest on 21 December 1971. He was nominated as Bishop of Ootacamund on 12 January 1997 and was consecrated by Cardinal Duraisamy Simon Lourdusamy with co-consecrators as Archbishop Michael Augustine and Archbishop Aruldass James on 29 January 1997.

He was appointed as archbishop for the Archdiocese of Pondicherry and Cuddalore on 10 June 2004 and installed on 5 July that year.

Pope Francis accepted his resignation on 27 January 2021 from the pastoral care of the Archdiocese of Pondicherry and Cuddalore after he reached the mandatory age of retirement in accordance with Canon Law.

In April 2021, he contracted COVID-19 and was hospitalised in St. Thomas Hospital, Chennai. Though he later tested negative, on 4 May morning, his health condition deteriorated as the oxygen saturation level was very low. He died the same day, 4 May 2021 at 9:30 pm.

His mortal remains were then brought to the Immaculate Conception Cathedral, Pondicherry, where he was laid for homage. The funeral Mass was celebrated on the evening of 5 May 2021. After that, he was laid to rest at the Clergy Cemetery inside the Cathedral Campus.

He thus served the Church as a priest for 50 years and as a bishop for 24 years.

== Past career ==
Before becoming Archbishop of Pondicherry and Cuddalore he has held the following posts:

- 1972-1976 - St. Joseph's Boarding, Cuddalore
- 1976-1981 - Higher Studies, Rome
- 1981 - Staff, St. Peter's Pontifical Seminary, Bangalore
- 1982-1990 - Vice Rector, St. Peter's Pontifical Seminary, Bangalore
- 1990-1996 - Rector, St. Peter's Pontifical Seminary, Bangalore
- 1997-2004 - Bishop of Ootacamund

Styles of Antony Anandarayar
- Reference style: The Most Reverend
- Spoken style: Your Excellency
- Religious style: Monsignor
- Posthumous style: not applicable

Catholic Church titles
Preceded by James Masilamony Arul Das	Bishop of Ootacamund; 2 January 1997 – 10 June 2004	Succeeded by Amalraj Arulappan
Preceded by Michael Augustine	Archbishop of Pondicherry and Cuddalore; 10 June 2004 – 27 January 2021	Succeeded by Peter Abir Antonisamy as Apostolic Administrator
