= Ubagarasamy Bernadeth =

Monseigneur Ubagarasamy Bernadeth
- Bishop of Roman Catholic Diocese of Coimbatore
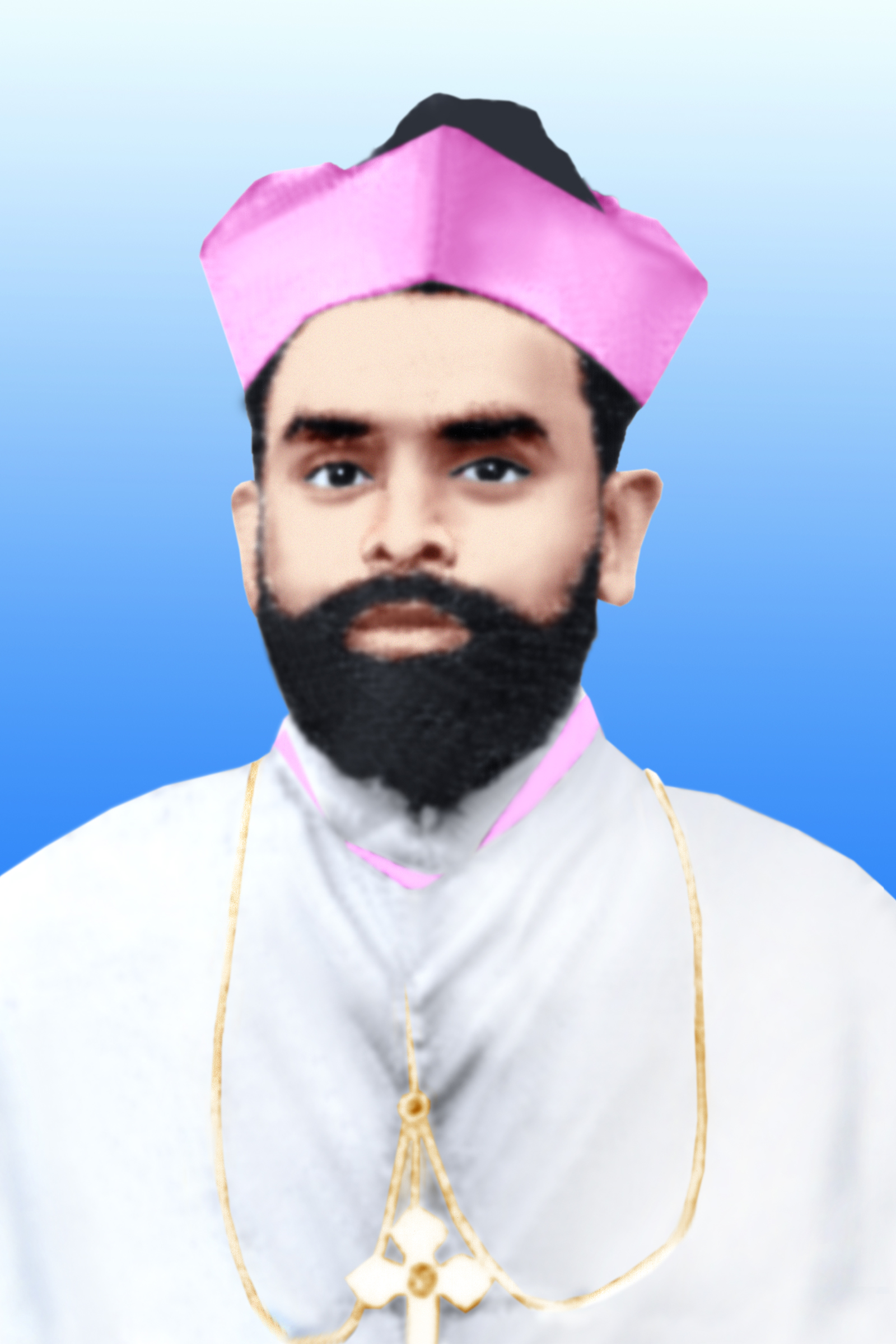
- Native name: உபகாரசாமி பெர்னதெத்
- Church: Catholic
- Diocese: Coimbatore
- See: Coimbatore
- Appointed: 9 April 1940
- Predecessor: Marie-Louis-Joseph-Constantin Tournier
- Successor: Francis Xavier Muthappa

Orders
- Ordination: 23 May 1925 by Elie-Jean-Joseph Morel
- Consecration: 25 July 1940 by Auguste-Siméon Colas

Personal details
- Born: 12 February 1899 Oulgaret parish, Rettiarpalayam, Pondicherry
- Died: 5 February 1949 (aged 49)
- Denomination: Catholic

Ubagarasamy Bernadeth or Oubagaraswami Bernadotte or Ubagaraswamy Bernadette (12 February 1899 – 5 February 1949) was the bishop of Roman Catholic Diocese of Coimbatore from 9 Apr 1940 till his death. He was the first indigenous person from the Archdiocese of Pondicherry and Cuddalore to receive episcopal ordination.

He was born in Oulgaret parish, Rettiarpalayam, Pondicherry. He was ordained a priest of the Archdiocese of Pondicherry on 23 May 1925. He worked as a professor at Petit Seminaire where he inaugurated the Eucharistic Crusade. His example was followed by other parishes such as Attipakkam, Irudayampet and Viriyur. He was appointed the Bishop of Coimbatore on 9 April 1940. He was consecrated by Auguste-Siméon Colas on 25 July 1940 at Coimbatore. He was the first Indigenous Bishop to be appointed in Coimbatore. He founded the workers association and arranged Sundays be declared as government holidays by all the mills. He encouraged the Presentation Sisters to take up the medical work and founded many schools and hospitals in the diocese.

On 26 May 1945, the First order of St. Francis of Assisi, a religious organization for women, under the name, Franciscan Sisters of the Presentation of Mary, with the assent of bishop Ubagarasamy was established.

He died suddenly at the age of 50 while on his way to visit his Metropolitan, the Archbishop of Pondicherry.

== Name Sakes ==
- Bishop Ubagaraswamy Higher Secondary School, Angeripalayam Main Rd, M G R Nagar, Weavers Colony Tiruppur, Tamil Nadu 641603, India

Catholic Church titles
Preceded by Marie-Louis-Joseph-Constantin Tournier	Roman Catholic Bishop of Coimbatore; 9 April 1940 – 5 February 1949	Succeeded by Francis Xavier Muthappa
