= Ambrose Rayappan =

Indian archbishop

Archbishop Ambrose Rayappan
- Archbishop Emeritus of Pondicherry and Cuddalore
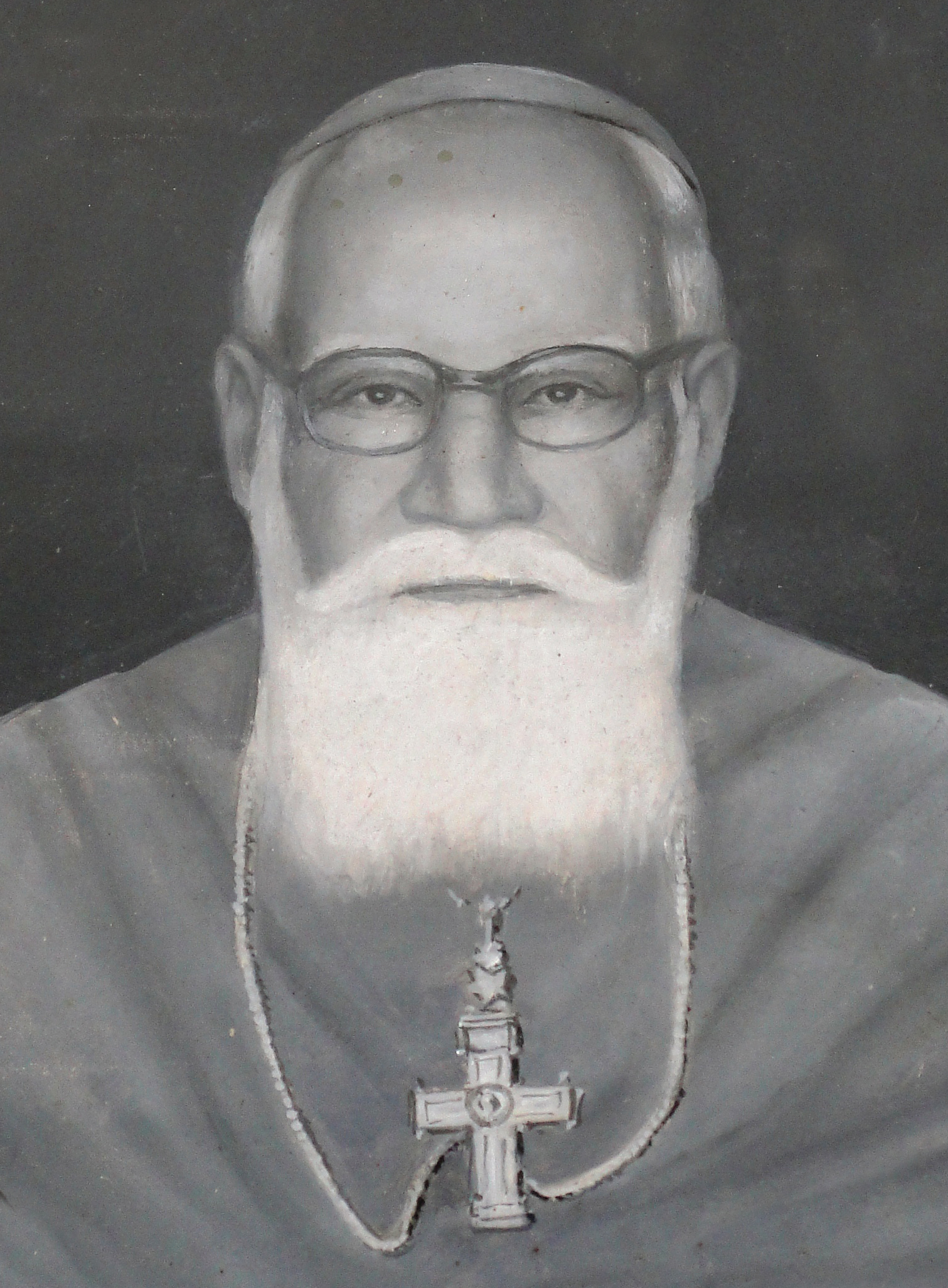
- See: Pondicherry and Cuddalore
- Appointed: 7 August 1953
- Installed: 25 March 1953
- Term ended: 17 March 1973
- Predecessor: Auguste-Siméon Colas
- Successor: Venmani S. Selvanather

Orders
- Ordination: 16 December 1923
- Consecration: 25 March 1953 by Auguste-Siméon Colas

Personal details
- Born: Ambrose Rayappan; 25 February 1901 Dharapuram
- Died: 24 November 1999 (aged 98) Pondicherry
- Buried: Cathedral Cemetery, Pondicherry
- Denomination: Catholic
- Motto: Fides Vincit Mundum
- Coat of arms: Ambrose Rayappan's coat of arms

Styles of Ambrose Rayappan
- Reference style: The Most Reverend
- Spoken style: Your Excellency
- Religious style: Monsignor

Ambrose Rayappan (25 February 1901 – 24 November 1999) was the tenth and the first indigenous Archbishop of the Archdiocese of Pondicherry and Cuddalore. He was born at Dharapuram, Tamil Nadu. He was ordained as a priest for the Diocese of Coimbatore on 16 December 1923. He participated in the Second Vatican council as a Council Father.

On 8 January 1953 he was appointed auxiliary bishop of Pondicherry and Cuddalore, and was consecrated on 25 March 1953 by Auguste-Siméon Colas. He was appointed as coadjutor of the same archdiocese on 7 August 1953. When Mgr. Colas resigned, he succeeded him on 28 November 1955. He resigned his post on 17 March 1973. He was succeeded by Venmani S. Selvanather.

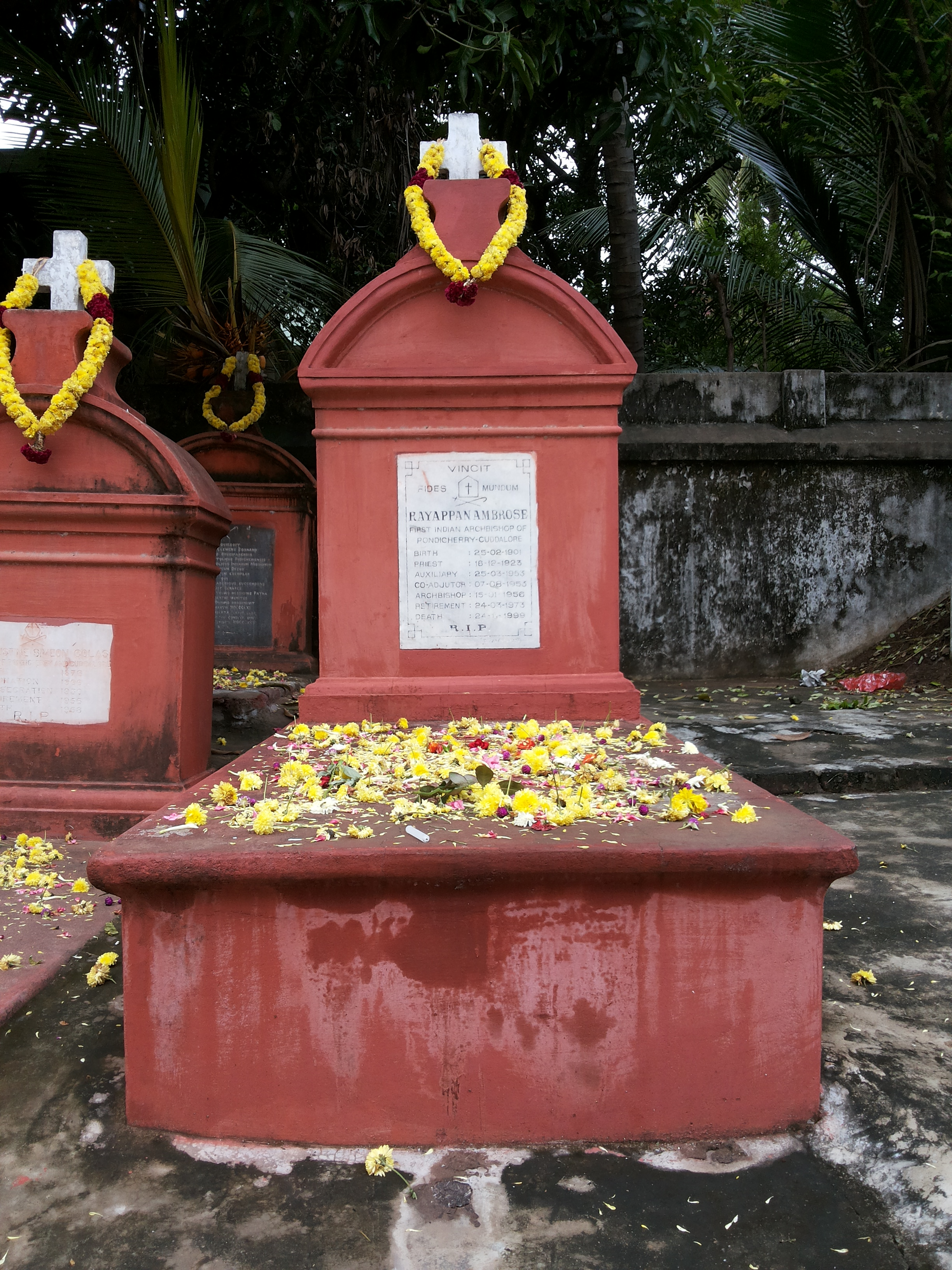
Tomb of Mgr. Ambrose Rayappan

Ordination history of Ambrose Rayappan
History
Episcopal consecration
- Principal consecrator: Auguste-Siméon Colas
- Co-consecrators: Thomas Pothacamury (Pothakamuri) Francis Xavier Muthappa
Episcopal succession
Bishops consecrated by Ambrose Rayappan as principal consecrator
- Duraisamy Simon Lourdusamy: 1962
- Joseph S. Thumma: 1970

Catholic Church titles
| Preceded by Danio Bolognini | — TITULAR — Bishop of Sidon; 8 January 1953 – 7 August 1953 | Succeeded by Romolo Carboni |
| Preceded by János Mikes | — TITULAR — Bishop of Selymbria; 7 August 1953 – 28 November 1955 | Succeeded by Miguel Darío Miranda y Gómez |
| Preceded by Auguste-Siméon Colas | Archbishop of Pondicherry and Cuddalore; 28 November 1955 – 17 March 1973 | Succeeded by Venmani S. Selvanather |
