= Diocese of Sultanpet =

Roman Catholic diocese in Kerala, India

Coordinates: 10.7718°N 76.6602°E

Diocese of Sultanpet Dioecesis Sultanpetensis

Location
- Country: India
- Territory: Palakkad district
- Ecclesiastical province: Calicut
- Metropolitan: Calicut

Statistics
- Area: 4,466 km^{2} (1,724 sq mi)
- Population: Total; Catholics: (as of 2013); 4,260,435; 30,975 (0.7%)
- Parishes: 31
- Schools: 4

Information
- Denomination: Roman Catholic
- Sui iuris church: Latin Church
- Rite: Roman Rite
- Established: 28 December 2013
- Cathedral: Saint Sebastian Cathedral, Sultanpet
- Patron saint: Saint Sebastian
- Secular priests: 46

Current leadership
- Pope: Leo XIV
- Bishop: Peter Abir Antonisamy
- Metropolitan Archbishop: Varghese Chakkalakal
- Vicar General: Rev Fr. Alese Sunder Raj

Website
- http://sultanpetdiocese.org

Roman Catholic Diocese of Sultanpet (Latin: Dioecesis Sultanpetensis) is a Roman Catholic diocese consisting of Palakkad district, Kerala, India erected from the division of the Roman Catholic Diocese of Coimbatore and Roman Catholic Diocese of Calicut, and a suffragan of the Roman Catholic Archdiocese of Verapoly. Rev. Peter Abir Antonisamy clergy of Archdiocese of Pondicherry and Cuddalore was appointed as its first bishop. The parish church of San Sebastian, located in Sultanpet in the city of Palakkad, is the cathedral of this diocese. At the time of its erection it was the 31st Catholic diocese in Kerala and 167th in India. The diocese is almost coterminous with the Syro-Malabar Catholic Diocese of Palghat.

== Parish Council Members ==
- Vicar General : Rev Fr. Alese Sunder Raj
- Parish President : Rev Fr. Jabamalai Lorance L
- Vice President : Christu raj
- Secretary : Justin
- Joint secretary : Antony
