= Joseph-Adolphe Gandy =

Archbishop Joseph-Adolphe Gandy M.E.P.
- Archbishop of Pondicherry
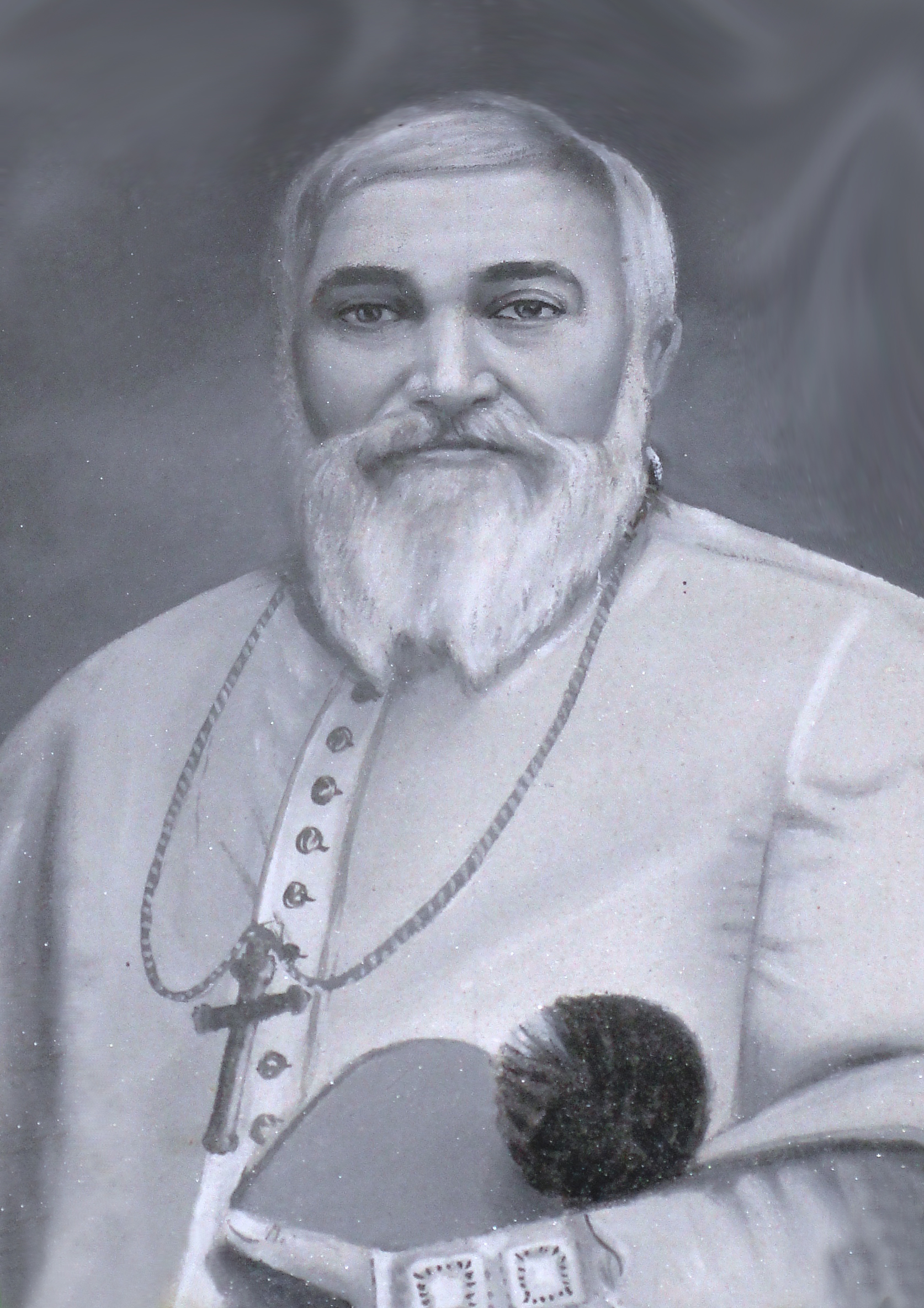
- See: Pondicherry
- Appointed: 15 January 1889
- Installed: 29 September 1892
- Term ended: 26 March 1909
- Predecessor: François-Jean-Marie Laouënan
- Successor: Elie-Jean-Joseph Morel

Orders
- Ordination: 13 July 1862
- Consecration: 9 September 1883 by François-Jean-Marie Laouënan

Personal details
- Born: Joseph-Adolphe Gandy; 25 February 1839 Châtonnay, France
- Died: 26 March 1909 (aged 70) Yercaud
- Buried: Cathedral Cemetery, Pondicherry
- Denomination: Catholic
- Motto: Dominare Nostri Tu Et Filius Tuus (Rule over us - you, your son - Judges 8:22)
- Coat of arms: Joseph-Adolphe Gandy's coat of arms

Styles of Joseph-Adolphe Gandy
- Reference style: His Excellency
- Spoken style: Your Excellency
- Religious style: The Most Reverend

Joseph-Adolphe Gandy (25 February 1839 – 26 March 1909) was a member of Paris Foreign Missions Society and was the archbishop of Archdiocese of Pondicherry. On 16 March 1883 he was appointed as a coadjutor vicar apostolic to succeed Bishop Laouënan. He was consecrated as a bishop on 9 September 1883 with Tricale as his titular see. When Pope Leo XII established Catholic hierarchy in India, he was appointed as the coadjutor archbishop of Pondicherry on 15 January 1889. After the death of Mgr. Laouënan he succeed him on 29 September 1892. He was the archbishop until his death on 26 March 1909. He was succeeded by Elie-Jean-Joseph Morel.

== Early life ==
He was born 25 February 1839 at St. Anne, Estrablin, which at that time was part of the Châtonnay; He studied at the seminary in La Côte-Saint-André and at the major seminary in Grenoble, where he was ordained priest on 13 July 1862. After two years as vicar at St. Symphorien d'Ozon, he entered the Seminary of Paris Foreign Missions Society on 7 August 1866.

== In India ==
He left for Pondicherry Mission on 15 March 1867. There he first worked as a teacher. In December 1870 Bishop Laouënan sent him to district of Kottapalayam, and in 1872, in that of Koneripatti where he remained for fifteen years. Despite many difficulties, he established a Christian colony, built a rectory, and laid the foundations of a church;

== As a bishop ==
He was chosen as coadjutor and was appointed Bishop of Tricala 16 March 1883, and consecrated as the titular Bishop of Tricale on 9 September of the same year in Pondicherry. He then while working as a professor of theology at the seminary also took care of district administration. He employed his time as a coadjutor to visit the mission and gaining complete knowledge of it. On 15 January 1889, he was named the coadjutor archbishop of Pondicherry with Claudiopolis in Honoriade as his titular. On 29 September 1892, he succeeded deceased Mgr. Laouenan as the archbishop of Pondicherry. During his tenure as the Archbishop, he gave importance to creating indigenous priests.

Upon his request on 1 September 1899, Pope Leo XIII erected the Diocese of Kumbakonam by dividing the Archdiociese of Pondicherry.

== Death ==
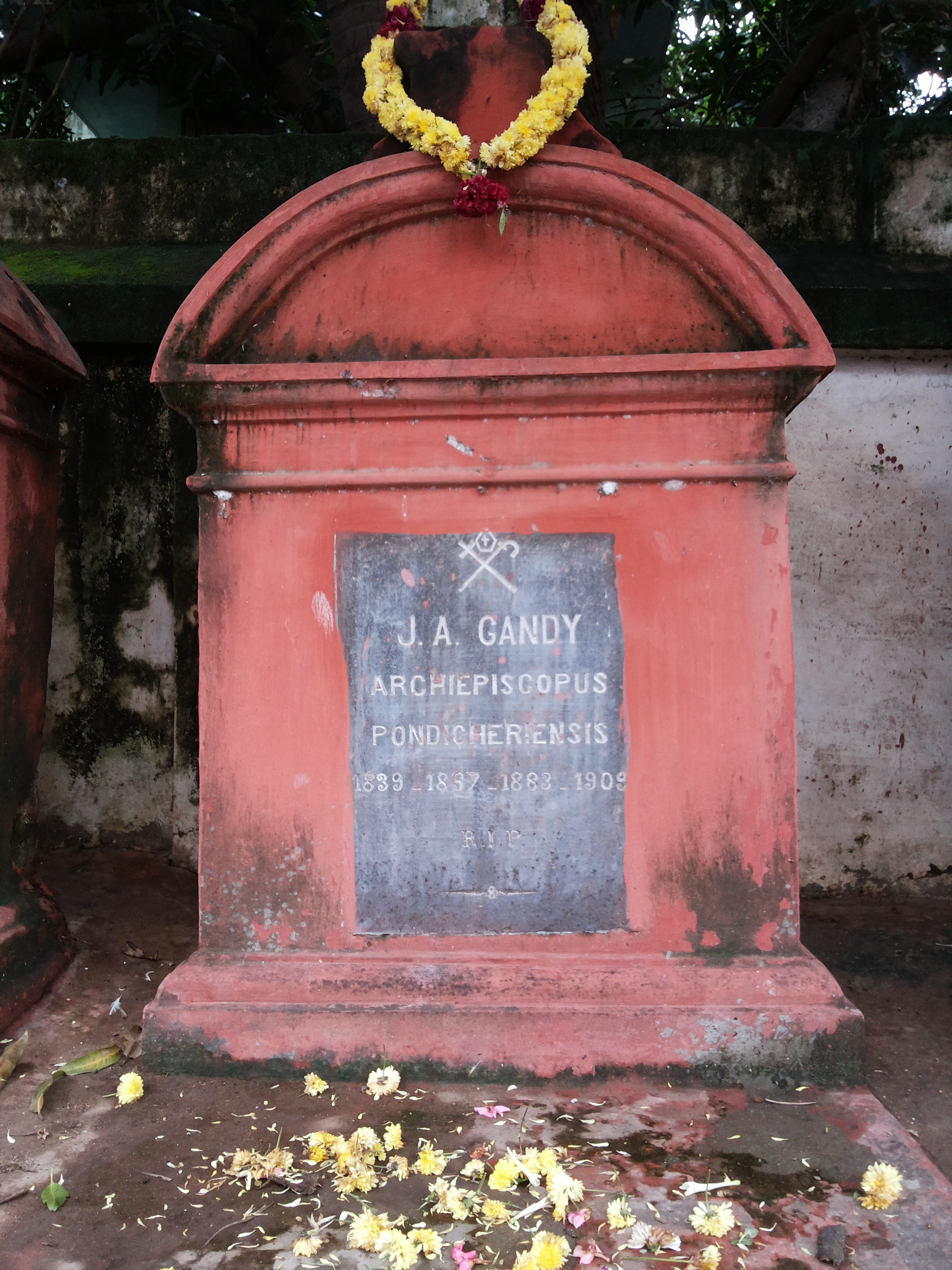
Tomb of Mgr. Joseph-Adolphe Gandy

In July 1908, the bishops of the ecclesiastical province of Pondicherry met to discuss general administrative matters; Although Mgr. Gandy seemed very tired, he was active. He died in Yercaud 25 March 1909 and was buried in Pondicherry Cathedral Cemetery.

The short biography of Mrg. Gandy at the MEP Archives ends as:

During his 42 years as a missionary, he was always on the road, always at work; He did that for the good of souls and the holy will of God. He practiced mortification, fasting, working which is a great example to his flock; He left us the example of the finest of virtues.

— MEP Archives

Ordination history of Joseph-Adolphe Gandy
History
Episcopal consecration
- Principal consecrator: François-Jean-Marie Laouënan
- Co-consecrators: Etienne-Auguste-Joseph-Louis Bardou; Jean-Yves-Marie Coadou
Episcopal succession
Bishops consecrated by Joseph-Adolphe Gandy as principal consecrator
- René-Michel-Marie Fée: 1896
- Hugues-Madelain Bottero: 1899
- Émile Marie Luc Alphonse Barillon: 1904
- Augustin-François Baslé: 1906

Catholic Church titles
Preceded by Portillo y Tejeda, O.F.M.	— TITULAR — Bishop of Tricale; 24 July 1868 – 25 November 1886	Succeeded by Kalman Belopotoczky
Preceded by Eugène J. C. J Desflèches	— TITULAR — Archbishop of Claudiopolis in Honoriade; 15 January 1889 – 29 September 1892	Succeeded by Giovanni Battista Bertagna
Preceded by Joseph-Isidore Godelle	Archbishop of Pondicherry; 29 September 1892 – 26 March 1909	Succeeded by Elie-Jean-Joseph Morel
