= Diocese of Meerut =

Roman Catholic diocese in Uttar Pradesh and Uttarakhand, India

Coordinates: 29.0013°N 77.7057°E

Diocese of Meerut Dioecesis Meerutensis

Location
- Country: India
- Ecclesiastical province: Agra
- Metropolitan: Agra

Statistics
- Area: 28,337 km^{2} (10,941 sq mi)
- Population: Total; Catholics: (as of 2004); 31,391,516; 27,192 (0.1%)

Information
- Rite: Latin Rite
- Cathedral: St Joseph’s Cathedral in Meerut
- Patron saint: Our Lady Mediatrix of All Graces

Current leadership
- Pope: Leo XIV
- Bishop: Bhaskar Jesuraj
- Metropolitan Archbishop: Raphy Manjaly

Website
- Website of the Diocese

The Roman Catholic Diocese of Meerut (Latin: Meeruten(sis)) is a diocese located in the city of Meerut in the ecclesiastical province of Agra in India.

== History ==
- 20 February 1956: Established as the Diocese of Meerut from the Metropolitan Archdiocese of Agra

== Special churches ==
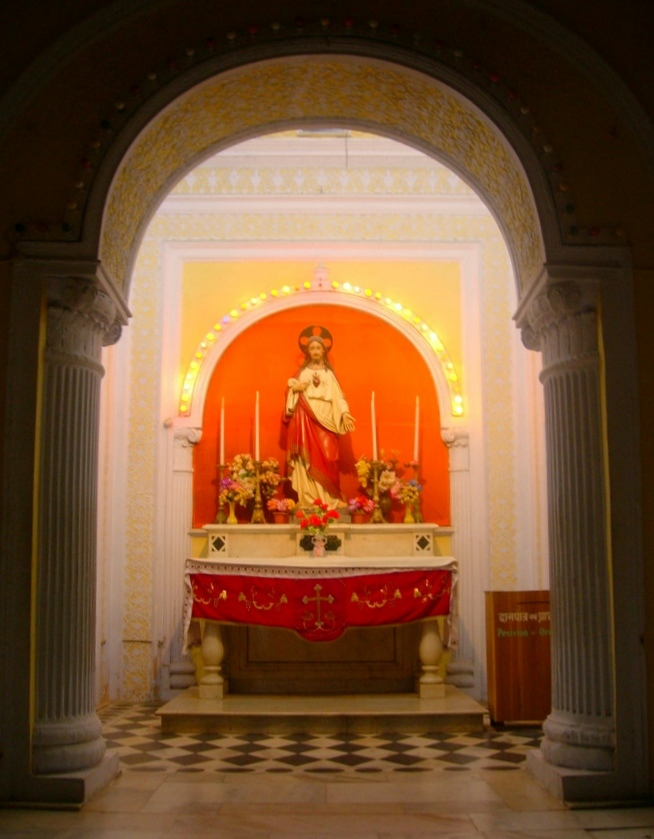
Interior of the Basilica of Our Lady of Graces, Sardhana.

- Minor Basilicas:
  - Basilica of Our Lady of Graces, Sardhana

== Leadership ==
- Bishops of Meerut (Latin Rite)
  - Archbishop Joseph Bartholomew Evangelisti, O.F.M. Cap. (29 February 1956 – 3 August 1973)
  - Bishop Patrick Nair (5 April 1974 – 3 December 2008)
  - Bishop Francis Kalist (3 December 2008 – 19 March 2022) Appointed Archbishop of Pondicherry and Cuddalore
  - Diocesan Administrator Fr. Valerian Pinto (2 May 2022 – Present)
  - Bishop-elect Bhaskar Jesuraj (13 January 2024 – Present)
