= Francis Kalist =

Bishop of the Roman Catholic Diocese of Meerut, India

His Grace, The Most Reverend Francis Kalist
- Archbishop of Pondicherry and Cuddalore
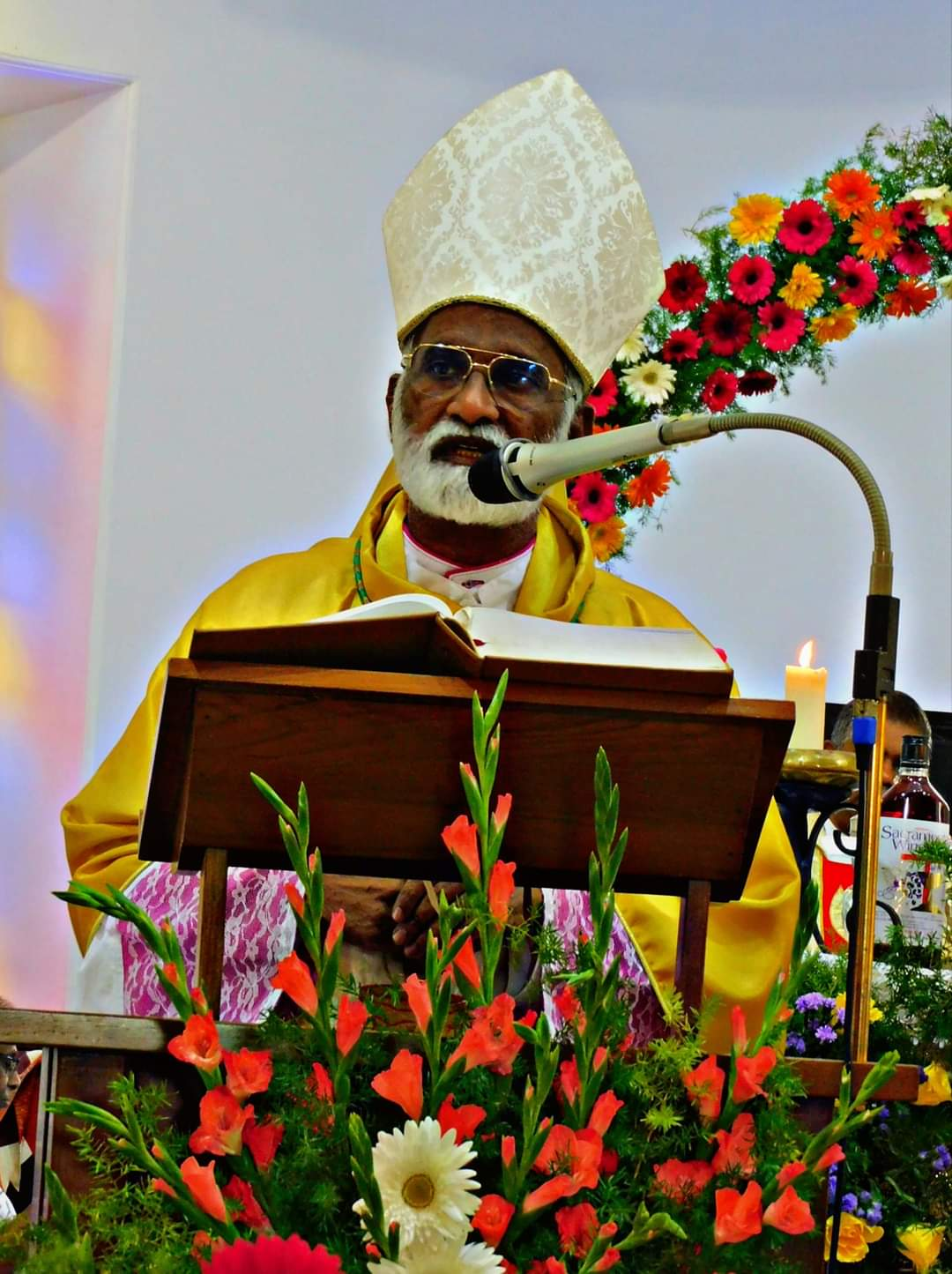
- Archdiocese: Archdiocese of Pondicherry and Cuddalore
- Appointed: 19 March 2022
- Installed: 29 April 2022
- Predecessor: Antony Anandarayar
- Successor: Incumbent
- Previous post: Bishop of Meerut

Orders
- Ordination: 30 December 1982
- Consecration: 8 Feb 2009 by Patrick Nair

Personal details
- Born: Francis Kalist; 23 November 1957 (age 68) Reethapuram, Tamil Nadu, India
- Denomination: Roman Catholic
- Motto: Omnia Omnibus

Bishop Francis Kalist is the Archbishop of Pondicherry and Cuddalore. He served as Bishop of Roman Catholic Diocese of Meerut, India from 2009 till 19 March 2022.

== Early life ==
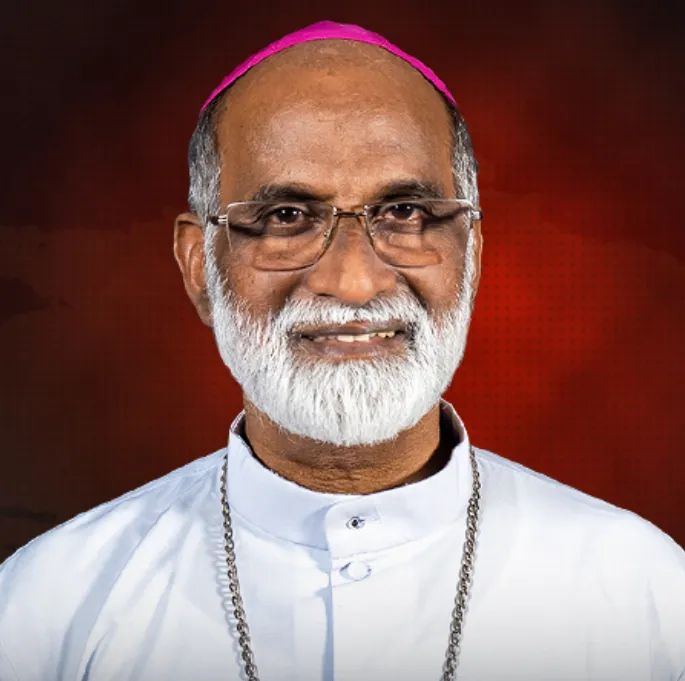
Archbishop Francis Kalist

Kalist was born on 23 November 1957 in Reethapuram, Tamil Nadu, India.

== Priesthood ==
On 30 December 1982, Kalist was ordained a Catholic priest for the Roman Catholic Diocese of Meerut.

== Episcopate ==
Kalist was appointed bishop of the Roman Catholic Diocese of Meerut on 3 Dec 2008 and ordained a bishop on 8 Feb 2009 by Patrick Nair. On 19 March 2022, Pope Francis appointed him as the Metropolitan Archbishop of Pondicherry and Cuddalore. He was installed on 29 April 2022. He received the pallium on 29 June 2022 from Pope Francis in St. Peter's Basilica, Vatican.

== See also ==
- List of Catholic bishops of India

Catholic Church titles
Preceded by Patrick Nair	Bishop of Meerut; 8 Feb 2009 - 19 Mar 2022	Succeeded by Bhaskar Jesuraj
Preceded by Peter Abir Antonisamy as Apostolic Administrator	Archbishop of Pondicherry and Cuddalore; 29 Apr 2022	Incumbent
