= Elie-Jean-Joseph Morel =

His Excellency Elie-Jean-Joseph Morel M.E.P.
- Archbishop Emeritus of Pondicherry; Titular Archbishop of Cotrada
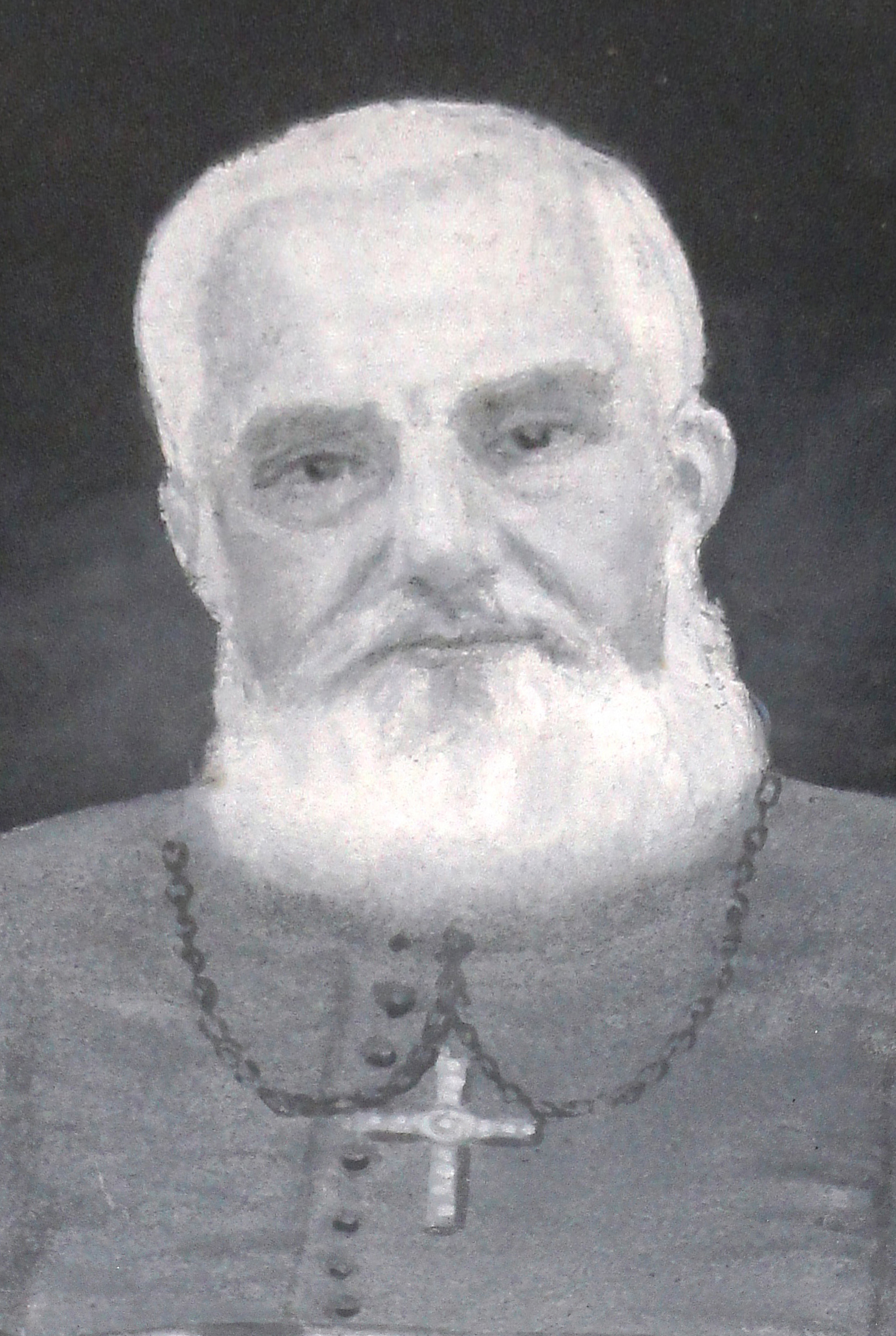
- Archbishop Elie-Jean-Joseph Morel
- See: Archdiocese of Pondicherry
- Appointed: 11 May 1909
- Installed: 21 September 1909
- Term ended: 16 August 1929
- Predecessor: Joseph-Adolphe Gandy
- Successor: Auguste-Siméon Colas

Orders
- Ordination: 24 September 1887
- Consecration: 21 September 1909 by Hugues-Madelain Bottero

Personal details
- Born: Elie-Jean-Joseph Morel; 27 December 1862 Bellefontaine, France
- Died: 15 June 1948 (aged 85) Bangalore
- Buried: Cemetery adjacent to Immaculate Conception Cathedral, Pondicherry
- Denomination: Catholic

Ordination history of Elie-Jean-Joseph Morel
History
Episcopal consecration
- Principal consecrator: Hugues-Madelain Bottero
- Co-consecrators: Teotonio Emanuele Ribeiro Vieira de Castro Augustine-Antoine Roy
- Date: 21 September 1909
- Place: Pondicherry
Episcopal succession
Bishops consecrated by Elie-Jean-Joseph Morel as principal consecrator
- Hippolyte Teissier: 24 January 1917
- Eugène Mederlet: 28 October 1928
- Henri-Aimé-Anatole Prunier: 14 September 1930
- Auguste-Siméon Colas: 29 September 1930

Elie-Jean-Joseph Morel (27 December 1862 – 15 June 1948) was a member of Paris Foreign Missions Society and was the archbishop of Archdiocese of Pondicherry. On 21 September 1909 he succeeded Archbishop Joseph-Adolphe Gandy. He was the bishop until 16 August 1929. He resigned for health reasons. He was succeeded by Auguste-Siméon Colas.

== Early life ==
He was born 27 December 1862 in Bellefontaine, diocese of Saint-Claude, Jura. He entered Paris Foreign Missions Society on 5 March 1885. He was ordained as a priest on 24 September 1887. He left immediately for the Pondicherry Mission where he was appointed as a professor of science at the Colonial College. Then, he was appointed as the parish priest of Thennur, where he made a relatively short stay. He was recalled to the College Saint Joseph at Cuddalore as professor of science. He was forced to return to Pondicherry to replace the top of the Grand Séminaire, P. Faure, who, extremely tired, had to return to France.

Mgr. Joseph-Adolphe Gandy, then Archbishop of Pondicherry, realizing that his health was failing, had requested Rome to give him a coadjutor. He died before getting a definitive answer. Six months after his death, Rome appointed Morel as his successor.

== As bishop ==
Mgr. Morel received his episcopal consecration at the hands of Mgr. Hugues-Madelain Bottero, M.E.P., Bishop of Kumbakonam on 21 September 1909. At that time, High caste Christians of Pondicherry were, as revolt against the authority, did not participate in the consecration event. The reason for the revolt was that the out-castes (Parias) wanted equal rights and demanded the removal of segregation of seats which were reserved for high caste peoples by hereditary. This situation was very discouraging to the new bishop. Calm was restored only after 1913.

During its years of episcopate Mgr. Morel worked specially, with the help of Fr. Gavan Duffy, to organize and to improve the training of teachers in the schools of the diocese, and to increase the vocation in the diocese.

In 1914, at the outbreak of the First World War, some missionaries were mobilized, and several posts lost their incharge. Mgr. Morel did not hesitate to become parish priest himself and settled in Villupuram until the end of the war in 1918. After the war he resumed his Episcopal duties in Pondicherry which included visits to parishes, confirmations, consecration of new chapels, churches, opening schools etc.

== Resignation and death ==
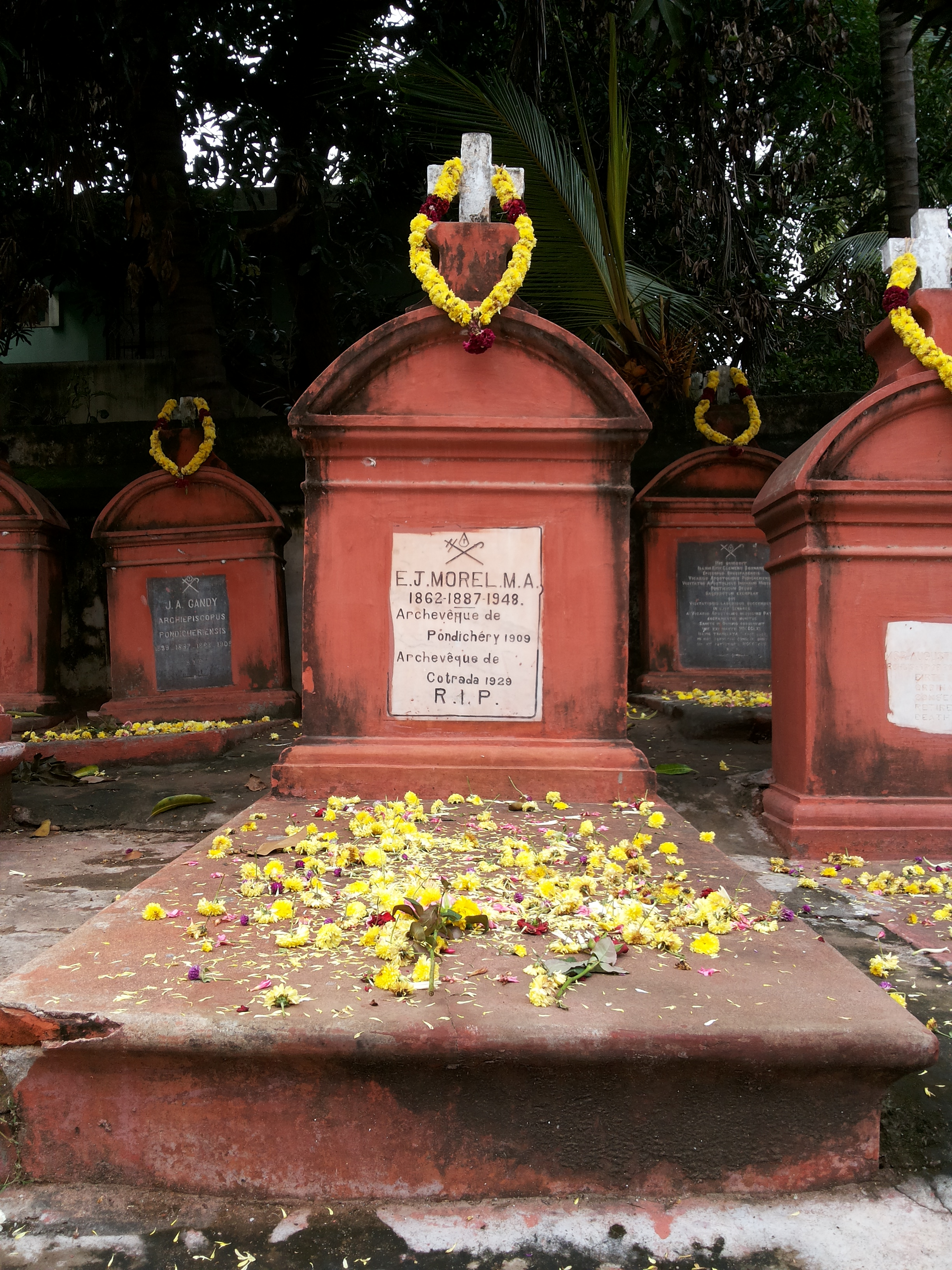
Tomb of Mgr. Elie-Jean-Joseph Morel

But in 1919, he believed his duty to resign because of his health. He was suffering with cataracts. Mgr. Auguste-Siméon Colas succeeded him.

Wanting to spend his time usefully, he became chaplain of the Sisters of St. Joseph of Cluny on the mountain of Yerkaud. This lasted a time, and he was forced to retire at St. Martha hospital, Bangalore, which was recently built by Mgr. Colas, for sick and aged missionaries. During the absence of Mgr. Despatures, Bishop of Bangalore, Mgr. Morel served by giving a few confirmations in the diocese.

But his strength quickly declined and after receiving the last sacraments and after two days of agony, he died 15 June 1948, eighteen years after his resignation. His body was transferred to Pondicherry, where the funeral mass was said in the cathedral. His body is buried next to his predecessor Mgr. Gandy, in the cemetery adjacent to Immaculate Conception Cathedral, Pondicherry.

Catholic Church titles
New creation	— TITULAR — Archbishop of Cotrada; 28 October 1955 – 24 October 1968	Succeeded by Hugo Bressane de Araújo
Preceded by Joseph-Adolphe Gandy	Archbishop of Pondicherry; 11 May 1909 – 16 August 1929	Succeeded by Auguste-Siméon Colas
