= Peter Abir Antonisamy =

Indian prelate

His Excellency Peter Abir Antonysamy
- Bishop of Sultanpet
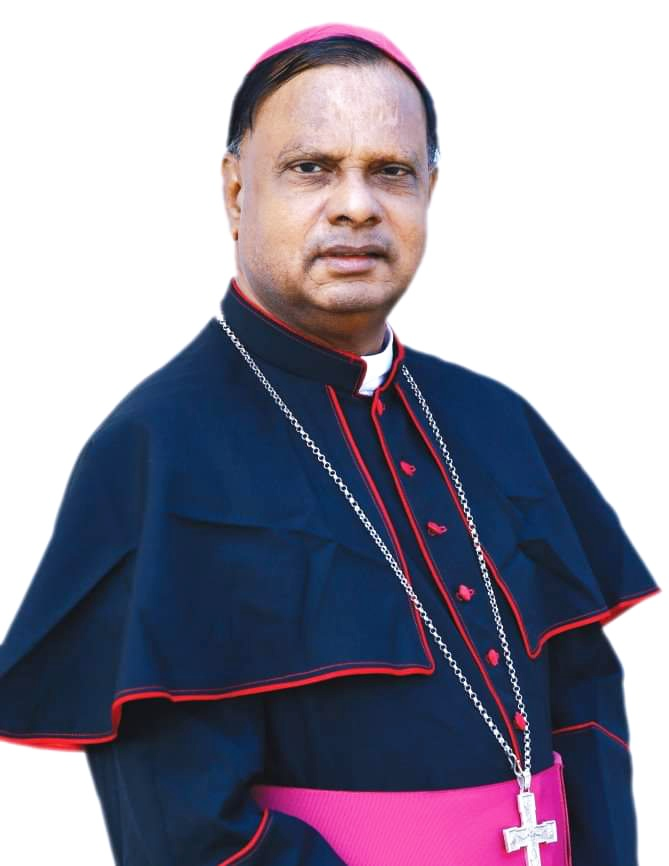
- See: Sultanpet
- Appointed: 28 December 2013
- Installed: 16 February 2014

Orders
- Ordination: 1 May 1979
- Consecration: 16 February 2014 by Salvatore Pennacchio

Personal details
- Born: Peter Abir Antonysamy; 7 April 1952 (age 74) Sathipattu
- Denomination: Catholic
- Motto: Fractus ut Aedificem (Broken to build)

Styles of Peter Abir Antonisamy
- Reference style: Right Reverend
- Spoken style: Your Excellency
- Religious style: Monsignor

Ordination history of Peter Abir Antonisamy
History
Episcopal consecration
- Principal consecrator: Salvatore Pennacchio
- Co-consecrators: Francis Kallarakal Thomas Aquinas Lephonse

Peter Abir Antonisamy (7 April 1952, Sathipattu, Cuddalore District, Tamil Nadu, India) is an Indian prelate of the Roman Catholic Church. He is the bishop of Roman Catholic Diocese of Sultanpet.

== Early life ==
He was born in Sathipattu, Cuddalore District, Tamil Nadu, India on 7 April 1952.

== Priesthood & Education ==
He was ordained a priest on 1 May 1979. He holds a master's degree in biblical theology from St. Peter's Pontifical Seminary, a master's degree in literature and history from the University of Titrupathy, India, a licentiate in sacred scriptures from the Pontifical Biblical Institute in Rome, and a doctorate in sacred scriptures from the Pontifical Gregorian University, Rome.

== Episcopate ==
He was appointed bishop of Sultanpet by Pope Francis on 28 December 2013. He was consecrated on 16 February 2014 with Archbishop Salvatore Pennacchio as principle consecrator. Archbishop Francis Kallarakal and Bishop Thomas Aquinas Lephonse acted as co-consecrators. His episcopal motto is broken to build.

On 27 January 2021, Pope Francis appointed Bishop Peter Abir as Apostolic Administrator of the Archdiocese of Pondicherry and Cuddalore upon the resignation of its Archbishop Antony Anandarayar. His office as Apostolic Administrator ceased by the appointment of Bishop Francis Kalist as Archbishop of Pondicherry on 19 March 2022.

== Experience ==
After ordination he held the following positions:

- 1979-1981: Assistant parish to Athipakkam;
- 1981-1983: Studies at St. Peter's Pontifical Institute, Bangalore;
- 1983-1984: Secretary of the Archbishop and Chancellor of the Curia;
- 1984-1986: Professor of Sacred Scripture at the Good Shepherd Seminary, Coimbatore;
- 1986-1987: Priest in Kurumbagaram;
- 1987-1990: Director of the St. Paul's Bible Institute, Poonamelle;
- 1990-1996: Studies in Rome, residing at the Pontifical College of St. Peter the Apostle;
- 1996-2004: Director of the St. Paul's Bible Institute, Poonamelle;
- 2002-2004: Deputy secretary of the Tamil Nadu Bishops' Council;
- 2002-2008: Coordinator for South Asia of the Catholic Biblical Federation;
- 2004-2010: Director of the Tamil Nadu Biblical, Catechetical and Liturgical Centre;
- Since 2010: Director Emmaus Spirituality Centre, Sithanagur, which he founded in 2004.
- Feb 2021 - Apr 2022: Apostolic Administrator of the Archdiocese of Pondicherry-Cuddalore

Catholic Church titles
New diocese	Bishop of Sultanpet; 16 February 2014	Incumbent
Preceded by Antony Anandarayar as Archbishop	Apostolic Administrator of Pondicherry and Cuddalore; 27 January 2021–29 April 2022	Succeeded by Francis Kalist as Archbishop
