= Diocese of Kumbakonam =

Latin Catholic diocese in India

Coordinates: 10.9562°N 79.3880°E

Diocese of Kumbakonam Dioecesis Kumbakonamensis கும்பகோணம் மறைமாவட்டம்

Location
- Country: India
- Ecclesiastical province: Pondicherry and Cuddalore

Statistics
- Area: 7,823 km^{2} (3,020 sq mi)
- Population: Total; Catholics: (as of 2004); 2,605,732; 195,582 (7.5%)
- Parishes: 94

Information
- Denomination: Catholic Church
- Sui iuris church: Latin Church
- Rite: Roman Rite
- Cathedral: St. Mary’s Cathedral in Kumbakonam
- Patron saint: St John de Brito

Current leadership
- Pope: Leo XIV
- Bishop: Jeevanandam Amalanathan
- Metropolitan Archbishop: Francis Kalist
- Vicar General: Philomin Doss
- Bishops emeritus: AnthonySamy Francis

Website
- Website of the Diocese

The Diocese of Kumbakonam (Latin: Kumbakonamen(sis)) is a Latin Church ecclesiastical jurisdiction or diocese of the Catholic Church in India. Its episcopal see is Kumbakonam. The Diocese of Kumbakonam is a suffragan in the ecclesiastical province of the metropolitan Archdiocese of Pondicherry and Cuddalore.

== History ==
- 1 September 1899: Established as Diocese of Kumbakonam from the Metropolitan Archdiocese of Pondicherry

== Special churches ==
- Minor Basilicas:
  - Basilica of Our Lady of Lourdes, Poondi

== Leadership ==
- Bishops of Kumbakonam
  - Bishop Jeevandham Amalanathan (13 January 2024 - Present)
  - Bishop Antonysamy Francis (31 May 2008 – 13 January 2024)
  - Bishop Peter Remigius (10 November 1989 – 30 June 2007)
  - Bishop Daniel Paul Arulswamy (5 May 1955 – 16 August 1988)
  - Bishop Peter Francis Rayappa (24 February 1931 – 20 September 1954)
  - Bishop Marie-Augustine Chapuis, M.E.P. (21 May 1913 – 17 December 1928)
  - Bishop Hugues-Madelain Bottero, M.E.P. (5 September 1899 – 21 May 1913)

== Saints and causes for canonisation ==
- Servant of God Fr. Lourdu Xavier Savarirayan
- Servant of God Fr. John Peter Savarinayagam, O.F.M. Cap.
