= Apostolic Prefecture of French Colonies in India =

Former Latin Catholic jurisdiction in French India

The Apostolic Prefecture of French Colonies in India (sometimes confusingly called 'of Pondicherry') was a Latin Church pre-diocesan jurisdiction for Catholic Church missions in the colonial enclaves constituting French India.

== History ==
In 1777 it was established as Apostolic Prefecture of the French Colonies in India, not entitled to a titular bishop, without a direct predecessor.

On 1886.09.01 it was suppressed, its territory being reassigned to the previously co-existent Archdiocese of Pondicherry (now Metropolitan Archdiocese of Pondicherry and Cuddalore).

== Ordinaries ==
(all missionary priests from Europe, notably from Latin Church congregations)

Apostolic Prefects of the French Colonies in India

- Sebastien de Nevers, OFMCap (born France, as probably most of his successors) (1776.09.28 – 1980.11.27)
- Donatus Aurelinensis, OFMCap (1780.11.27 – 1786.09.11)
- Hilarius Pictaviensis, OFMCap (1786.09.11 – 1788.11.24)
- Damasus d’Oleron, OFMCap (1788.11.24 – ?)
- Benedictus di Monterotundo, OFMCap (1792.02.21 – ?)
- Pierre-Jean-Norbert Calmels, (1828.06.14 – 1859)
- Pierre Brunie (1859 – ?)

== See also ==
- Goa Inquisition
- List of Catholic dioceses in India
- Persecution of Hindus
- Catholic Church in India

== Source and external links ==
- Adrien Launay, Histoire des Missions de l'Inde. Pondicherry, Maissour, Coimbatour, 5 volumes, Paris 1898
- GCatholic.org
