= Sultanpet =

Sultanpet may refer to:

- Roman Catholic Diocese of Sultanpet, Palakkad district, Kerala, India
- Sultanpet Block, Coimbatore district, Tamil Nadu, India
- Sultanpet, a neighbourhood in Bangalore, Karnataka, India
- Sultanpet, a village in Nizamabad district, Telangana, India

== See also ==
- Battle of Sultanpet Tope, 1799, during the Fourth Anglo-Mysore War
