= Ambrose Mathalaimuthu =

- Bishop of Coimbatore
- Church: Catholic Church
- Diocese: Diocese of Coimbatore
- In office: 6 December 1979 – 10 July 2002
- Predecessor: Manuel Visuvasam
- Successor: Thomas Aquinas Lephonse
- Previous post: Bishop of Tuticorin (1971-1979)

Orders
- Ordination: 21 December 1951
- Consecration: 9 December 1971 by Justin Diraviam

Personal details
- Born: 20 July 1925 Nagalur (near Yercaud), Presidency of Fort St. George, British Raj, British Empire
- Died: 15 November 2009 (aged 84)

The Most Reverend Ambrose Mathalaimuthu D.D. D.C.L. (25 July 1925 – 15 November 2009) was Bishop Emeritus of the Roman Catholic Diocese of Coimbatore, India.

Born in Nagalur, Tamil Nadu, South India, he was ordained as a priest on 21 December 1951. He was appointed bishop of the Roman Catholic Diocese of Tuticorin on 30 August 1971 and was ordained on 9 December 1971. On 6 December 1979, he was appointed bishop of the Coimbatore Diocese, retiring on 10 July 2002, shortly before his 77th birthday.
