= Patrick Nair =

Indian Roman Catholic bishop

- Bishop of Meerut
- Church: Catholic Church
- Diocese: Diocese of Meerut
- In office: 5 April 1974 – 3 December 2008
- Predecessor: Joseph Bartholomew Evangelisti
- Successor: Francis Kalist

Orders
- Ordination: 3 October 1959
- Consecration: 2 October 1974 by Dominic Athaide

Personal details
- Born: 15 August 1932 Delhi, British Raj, British Empire
- Died: 7 October 2017 (aged 85) Dehradun, Uttarakhand, India

Patrick Nair (15 August 1932 – 7 October 2017) was a Roman Catholic bishop.

Ordained to the priesthood in 1959, Nair served as bishop of the Roman Catholic Diocese of Meerut, India, from 1974 to 2008.

== See also ==
- Catholic Church in India
