= Reethapuram =

- Town
- Location in Tamil Nadu, India
- Coordinates: 8°13′31″N 77°17′42″E
- Country: India
- State: Tamil Nadu
- District: Kanniyakumari

Population (2001)
  - Total: 11,625

Languages
  - Official: Tamil
- Time zone: UTC+5:30 (IST)
- Postal code: 629159
- Vehicle registration: TN 75

Reethapuram is a panchayat town in Kanniyakumari district in the Indian state of Tamil Nadu.

== Demographics ==
As of 2001 India census, Reethapuram had a population of 11,625. Males constitute 48% of the population and females 52%. Reethapuram has an average literacy rate of 80%, higher than the national average of 59.5%: male literacy is 82%, and female literacy is 78%. In Reethapuram, 11% of the population is under 6 years of age. It has a traditional church and it has a good Higher Secondary School, namely Providence Higher Secondary School, which is managed by the Holy Cross Sisters.
