= Archdiocese of Pondicherry and Cuddalore =

Catholic archdiocese in Pondicherry and Cuddalore, India

Archdiocese of Pondicherry and Cuddalore Archidioecesis Pondicheriensis et Cuddalorensis: Archidiocèse de Pondichéry et Cuddalore; புதுவை கடலூர் உயர் மறைமாவட்டம்

Catholic
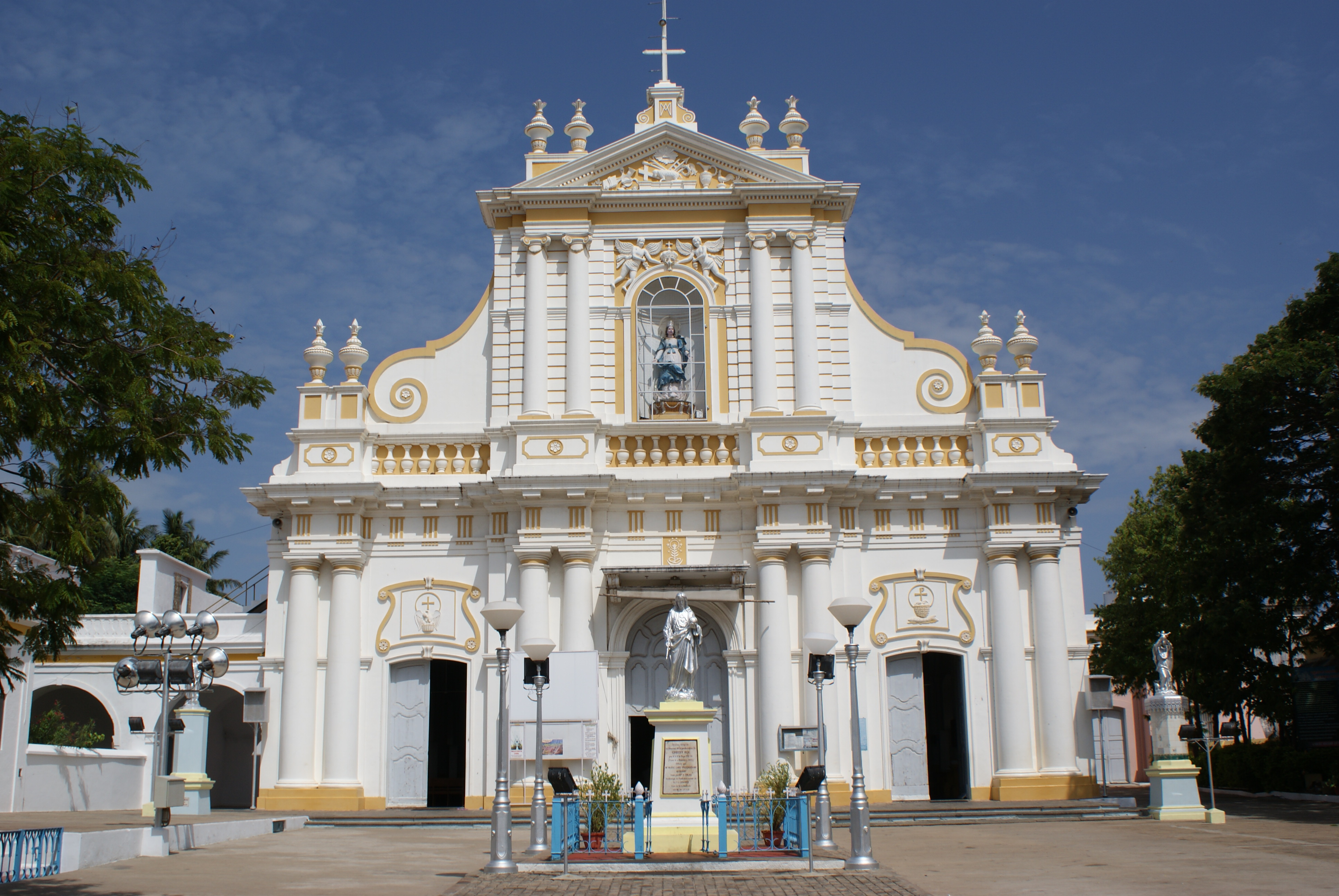
- Immaculate Conception Cathedral, The Mother Church of the Archdiocese

Location
- Country: India
- Ecclesiastical province: Pondicherry and Cuddalore

Statistics
- Area: 15,250 km^{2} (5,890 sq mi)
- Population: Total; Catholics: (as of 2021); 8,170,086 (Note: Annuario Pontificio (2022) via Catholic-Hierarchy.org); 400,361 (4.9%)
- Parishes: 105

Information
- Denomination: Catholic Church
- Sui iuris church: Latin Church
- Rite: Latin Rite
- Established: 1776; 250 years ago
- Cathedral: Immaculate Conception Cathedral, Pondicherry
- Patron saint: Our Lady of the Immaculate Conception
- Secular priests: 234 (183 diocesan; 51 religious)
- Calendar: Indian national calendar

Current leadership
- Pope: Leo XIV
- Metropolitan Archbishop: Francis Kalist
- Suffragans: Dharmapuri: Lawrence Pius Dorairaj; Kumbakonam: Jeevanandam Amalanathan; Salem: Arulselvam Rayappan; Tanjore: Sagayaraj Thamburaj

Map
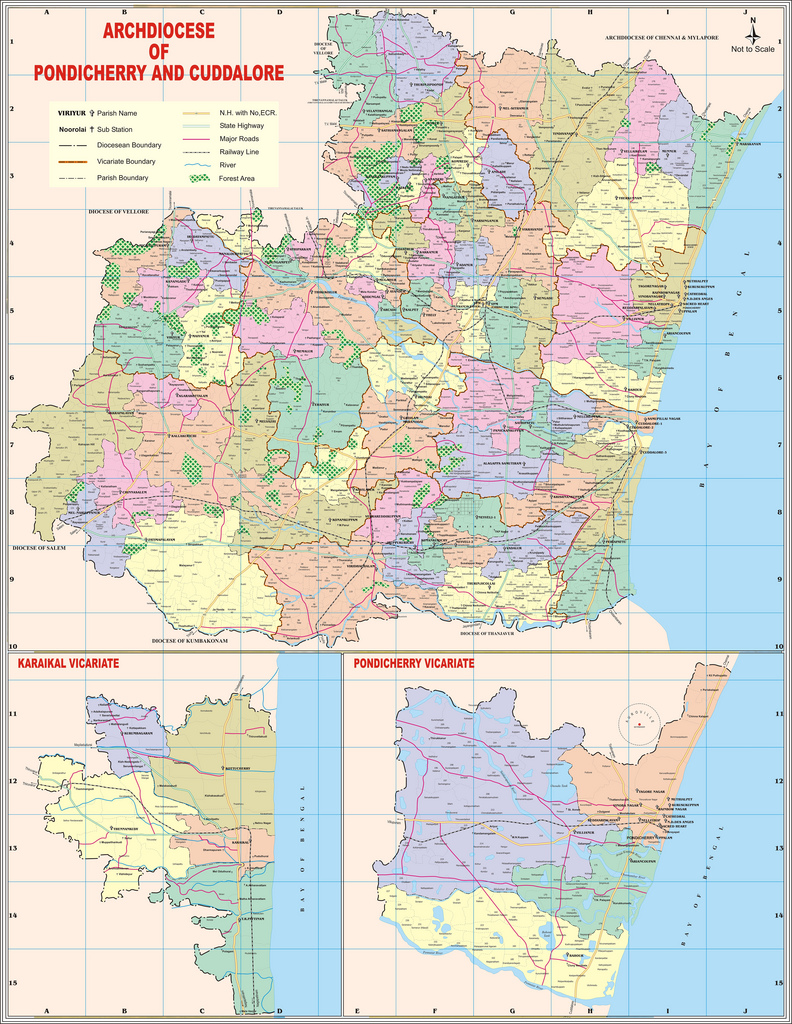

Website
- pondicherryarchdiocese.org

The Metropolitan Archdiocese of Pondicherry and Cuddalore (Latin: Archidioecesis Pondicheriensis et Cuddalorensis) is a Latin metropolitan see of the Catholic Church of Pondicherry and Cuddalore in India.

== History ==
=== The Mission of The Capuchins And The Jesuits ===
French Capuchins were the first missionaries to Pondicherry in 1632. Two more groups of Capuchins arrived in the following decades and they established a mission there in 1674. The great ancestor of this Archdiocese is the Carnatic Mission, which was started around the year 1700 as Mission sui iuris. This Carnatic Mission was known as Missions of the Coromandel Coast and also as the Malabar Mission.

Before the establishment of the Carnatic Mission in 1700, the Jesuit Fathers of the Madurai Mission, especially John de Britto, entered the Gingee kingdom after 1660, and preached the Gospel up to the Palar River, south of Madras. Members of various religious orders, looked after the spiritual needs of the European communities in their trading centres along the coastal areas, including Cuddalore and Porto Novo.

The French Capuchins first settled in Pondicherry in 1674 and the French Jesuits, expelled from Siam also took refuge with the Capuchins in Pondicherry in 1688. In 1693, the Dutch chased away all the religious groups from Pondicherry, and they were only able to return in 1699. While the Capuchins were looking after the Europeans in Pondicherry, the French Jesuits organized the Carnatic Mission for the Indian people.

=== The Boundaries Of the Carnatic Mission ===
The boundaries of the Carnatic mission were as follows:

- To the south and west, the Pennaiyar River, beyond which were the Madurai and Mysore missions
- To the east, the Bay of Bengal
- To the north, Kurnool, including the Krishna and Godavari areas near the coast.

=== Jesuits Replaced By Foreign Mission Fathers ===
The continual wars in the 18th century, the ruin of Pondicherry town in 1761 and the suppression of the Society of Jesus in 1773, badly hit the vast Carnatic Mission. In 1776, the French Jesuit fathers were replaced at the order of Rome by the foreign Mission French Fathers. Although the Bishop of these new missionaries had all the power of jurisdiction, he was not given the title "Vicar Apostolic", but instead called the "Superior of the Mission of the Coromandel Coast". Rome successively gave him the jurisdiction over the Madurai, Coimbatore and Mysore areas, affected by the suppression of the Society of Jesus. By 1800, the extent of the Carnatic Mission was immense, but the labourers were very few.

=== The First Vicar Apostolic And The First Archbishop ===
The Carnatic Mission was reorganized when new apostolic vicariates were created: Madras in 1832, Madurai in 1836, and the vicariates of Visakhapatnam, Mysore and Coimbatore in 1845.

Pondicherry became an apostolic vicariate of the Coromandel coast, on 1 September 1836, with Mgr. Bonnand as its first vicar apostolic. This apostolic vicariate was raised to an archbishopric on 1 September 1886. Mgr. Laouenan was the first archbishop.

Subsequently, subdivisions of the archdiocese took place, creating the new dioceses of Kumbakonam in 1899 and Salem in 1930. In 1928, a great part of the present diocese of Vellore was separated from Pondicherry and attached to the archdiocese of Madras and Mylapore. On a reorganisation of the archdiocese by Rome in 1969, the Madurantagam taluk of Kanchipuram district was transferred to Madras, and Tiruvannamalai taluk to Vellore.

=== The Final Formation ===
As the archdiocese of Pondicherry extended over the Pondicherry union territory and the South Arcot district of Madras State, on 7 August 1953 it was given a new title by Rome: the "Archdiocese of Pondicherry and Cuddalore".

Originally, the archdiocese included the former French settlements of Pondicherry, Karaikal, Chandannagar, Mahe, and Yanam. Another ex-French settlement was also looked after by the MSFS Fathers in Visakhapatnam. Chandannagar was re-allocated to the archdiocese of Calcutta, now Kolkata, and Mahé to the Kerala diocese of Calicut, now Kozhikode, in 1949.

The present archdiocese of Pondicherry and Cuddalore extends over the Pondicherry and Karaikal districts of Puducherry and the Cuddalore (excluding Chidambaram and Kattumannarkoil taluks) and Viluppuram districts of Tamil Nadu.

== 21st century ==
With a land area of 11,348 square kilometers, the Archdiocese of Pondicherry-Cuddalore extends over the Pondicherry and Karaikal civil districts of Puducherry union territory and the civil districts of Cuddalore and Viluppuram of Tamil Nadu state. In 2001, the total population of the area was 6,151,891. Ethnic groups in the territory include the Tamils and French.

In 2022, the diocese had 3,99,461 Catholic faithful across 105 parishes, as well as 187 diocesan clergy, 84 religious priests and 1,035 religious sisters; the church also ran 311 educational institutions.

== Leadership ==
=== Superior of Karnatic Mission / Pondicherry ===
- Pierre Brigot (1776–1791)
- Nicolas Champenois (1791–1801)

=== Vicars Apostolic ===
- Louis-Charles-Auguste Hébert (1810–1835)
- Clément Bonnand, M.E.P. (3 April 1850 – 21 March 1861)
- Joseph-Isidore Godelle, M.E.P. (21 March 1861 – 15 July 1867)
- François-Jean-Marie Laouënan, M.E.P. (24 July 1868 – 29 September 1892)

=== Archbishops ===
- Joseph-Adolphe Gandy, M.E.P. (29 September 1892 – 25 March 1909)
- Elie-Jean-Joseph Morel, M.E.P. (11 May 1909 – 16 August 1929)
- Auguste-Siméon Colas, M.E.P. (24 June 1930 – 28 October 1955)
- Ambrose Rayappan (28 November 1955 – 17 March 1973)
- Venmani S. Selvanather (17 March 1973 - 18 February 1992)
- Michael Augustine (18 February 1992 – 10 June 2004 )
- Antony Anandarayar (10 June 2004 – 27 January 2021)
- Francis Kalist (19 March 2022 – Incumbent)

=== Apostolic Administrator ===
- Bishop Peter Abir Antonisamy (27 January 2021 - 19 March 2022). Upon the resignation of Archbishop Antony Anandarayar, for the first time in the history of Archdiocese, an Apostolic Administrator was appointed by Pope Francis. Bishop Peter Abir Antonisamy (Bishop of Sulthanpet) was appointed as the Apostolic Administrator of the Archdiocese. He ceased to be the Apostolic Administrator by the appointment of Most. Rev. Francis Kalist as Archbishop of Pondicherry and Cuddalore.

== Bishops and Cardinals from this Archdiocese ==
=== Bishops ===
The following bishops were ordained to priesthood for Archdiocese of Pondicherry and Cuddalore and later were appointed as Bishops of various dioceses. They are:

- Ubagarasamy Bernadeth, Bishop of Coimbatore (1940)
- Joseph Mark Gopu, Auxiliary Bishop of Pondicherry (1948), Archbishop of Hyderabad (1953)
- Joseph S. Thumma, Bishop of Vijayawada (1970)
- Michael Duraisamy, Bishop of Salem (1974)
- Archbishop Michael Augustine, Auxiliary Bishop of Madras-Mylapore (1978), Bishop of Vellore (1981) and Archbishop of Pondicherry (1992)
- Antony Anandarayar, Bishop of Ooty (1997) and Archbishop of Pondicherry (2004)
- Yvon Ambrose, Bishop of Tuticorin (2005)
- Peter Abir Antonisamy, Bishop of Sultanpet (2013)
- Arulselvam Rayappan, Bishop of Salem (2021)

The following are the bishops who are native of the Archdiocese of Pondicherry but were ordained as priests in another diocese or religious order:

- Archbishop Malayappan Chinnappa, S.D.B., Bishop of Vellore (1992), Archbishop of Madras-Mylapore (2005).
- Bishop Anthonysamy Neethinathan, (Clergy of Madras-Mylapore) Bishop of Chinglepet (2002)

=== Cardinal ===
- Duraisamy Simon Lourdusamy (1985–2014)

== Suffragan dioceses ==
Suffragan dioceses of this archdiocese are:

- Dharmapuri
- Kumbakonam
- Salem
- Tanjore

== Saints and causes for canonisation ==
- Servant of God Fr. Louis Savinien Dupuis, MEP
- Servant of God Fr. Michael [Michele] Ansaldo

== See also ==
- Apostolic Prefecture of French Colonies in India – Former Latin Catholic jurisdiction in French India
- Catholic Bishops' Conference of India – Association of the Catholic bishops of India
- Catholic Church in India
- List of Catholic dioceses in India
- Syro-Malabar Church – Eastern Catholic church
- Syro-Malankara Catholic Church – Eastern Catholic church
