= M. Ilango =

Indian politician

Member of the Legislative Assembly (MLA)
- Constituency: Cassicade, Pondicherry

Personal details
- Education: Petit Seminaire Higher Secondary School

M. Ilango; (born 14 June 1955) is an Indian politician from the Union territory of Puducherry, who serves as the Chairperson of the National Fisherfolk Forum (NFF). Ilango served as a State Vice President of Indian National Congress (INC) party for Puducherry State. He represented Janta Dal (JD) in 1991 -1996 Legislative assembly. Ilango is also the President of The Puducherry French Indians Rights Forum.

== Member of Legislative Assembly (MLA) ==
Ilango became a Member of the Legislative Assembly (MLA) from Cassicade Constituency, Puducherry in the 1991 assembly elections against the then strongman and chief ministerial aspirant P. Shanmugam who later went on to become the Chief Minister of the State in 2000.

== Separate Service Commission for Union Territory ==
The Puducherry French Indians Rights Forum has urged the Government to initiate immediate steps to set up a Public Service Commission as in other States to ensure that recruitment to various posts in A and B categories in government services in the Union Territory benefits the locals. Ilango has filed a Writ petition in Madras High Court demanding a Separate Service Commission for Puducherry.
