= Petit Seminaire Higher Secondary School =

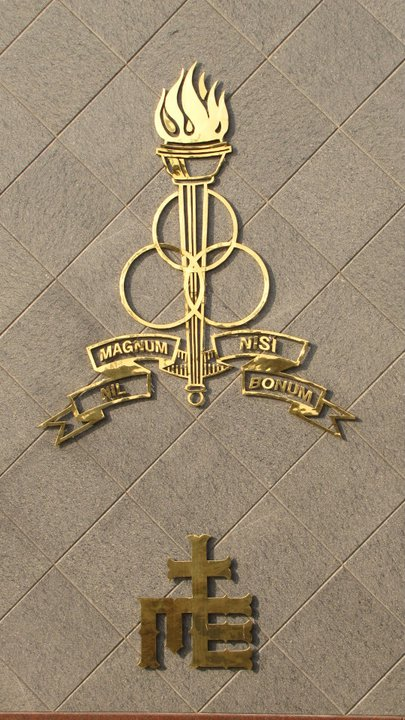

Location
- 355, Mahatma Gandhi Road; Pondicherry, Puducherry 605 001; India; 11°56′00.12″N 79°49′46.14″E

Information
- School type: Private Higher secondary school
- Motto: Latin: Nil Magnum Nisi Bonum (English: Nothing Is Great Unless It Is Good; Tamil: நல்லதே மேலானது)
- Religious affiliation: Catholic
- Patron saint: Saint Joseph
- Established: January 1844
- School board: Matriculation / State Board
- Principal: Rev. Fr. Arokiraj.A
- Staff: 200+
- Teaching staff: 30+
- Gender: All-male
- Classes: Lower and upper Kindergarten; 1 Std to 12 Std
- Average class size: 60-70
- Language: English
- Hours in school day: 8
- Classrooms: 156
- Campuses: Main Campus; Uppalam Campus
- Campus: Urban
- Campus size: 7 acre size
- Houses: Red House, Blue House, Yellow House and Green House
- Colours: White and grey
- Nickname: PSHSS
- Website: petitseminaire.org.in

Petit Seminaire Higher Secondary School is a higher secondary school for boys in the union territory of Puducherry, India started in 1844.

== History ==
The history of Petit Seminaire dates back to 1844 as a seminary attended by 89 students of whom 25 seminarians. In 1873 it became a public college. In 1880, Petit Seminaire stopped receiving government subsidy, and has maintained its financial independence.

The student population showed an increase from 800 in 1903 to 1100 in 1907, of whom 700 were Catholics. In 1932, the English section was upgraded into a high school, preparing boys for matriculation and was affiliated with the Madras university. In July 1978, Petit Seminaire was born again, this time as Petit Seminaire Higher Secondary School, offering two courses of study at the higher secondary level.

The school's motto is "Nil Magnum Nisi Bonum" meaning "Nothing is great unless good".

When Fr. J. Paul became the principal of the school in December 1984 there were 3,500 students and when he left the strength was 6,100. He produced 100% results quite a few times both in Matriculation and higher Secondary. The school got the first few ranks consistently in Puducherry territory.

== Curriculum ==
=== Languages ===
Tamil is taught as a compulsory subject to all students up to fifth standard. Tamil, Hindi and French are offered as optional from sixth standard onward.

English is taught as the primary language for all students from LKG(Lower Kinder Garden) to 12th standard classes.

=== Physical health education ===
Physical training and health education is given to all the students from lower kindergarten to higher secondary level. 'Human Resource Development' subject is taken from fourth standard to ninth standard.

=== Computer education ===
All students from the lower kindergarten to tenth grade are given computer experience. Computer science is taught as a subject. It has been extended to 11th and 12th standard computer science students only.

=== Majors/subjects offered in higher secondary course ===
- Part I - Primary language - English
- Part II - Secondary language - Tamil, Hindi, French
- Group I - Biology(Both Botany and Zoology), Physics & Chemistry, Mathematics (three sections - A1, A2, A3).
- Group II - Computer science, Physics & Chemistry, Mathematics (two sections - B1, B2).
- Group III - Commerce, Economics, Accountancy & Business Mathematics. (one section - C).

== Leadership ==
The principals of this school over the time are:

1. Fr. Marion Bresillac Melchior Marie Joseph (1844 – 1846)
2. Fr. Joseph-Isidore Godelle (1846 – 1850)
3. Fr. Godet Louis Prosper Adolphe Marie. (1850 – 1855)
4. Fr. Henry Joseph (1855 – 1883)
5. Fr. Dury Ernest (1883 – 1887)
6. Fr. Jegorel Jean Marie (1888 -1894)
7. Fr. Leroy Pierre Gustave (1895 – 1900)
8. Fr. Escande Pierre Etienne (1900 – 1933)
9. Fr. Guillerm Francois (1933 – 1948)
10. Fr. P. A. Swamikannu (1948 – 1960)
11. Fr. S. Peter (1960 – 1970, 1973 – 1980)
12. Fr. R. Ratchagar (1970 – 1971)
13. Fr. C. N. Philip (1971 – 72)
14. Fr. P. Jegaraj (1972 – 73)
15. Fr. M. Peter (1981 – 84)
16. Fr. J. Paul (1984 – 1997)
17. Fr. A. Arulappan – (1997 – 1999)
18. Fr. M. Dominic Rozario (1999 – 2002)
19. Fr. S. Antonisamy (2002 – 2007)
20. Fr. M. S. John Bosco (2007 – 2013)
21. Fr. P. Arulnathan (2013 - 2015)
22. Fr. R. Pascal Raj (2015– 2023)
23. Fr. Devadoss Antony (2023–2026)
24. Fr. A. Arokiraj (2026 - Present).

== Notable alumni ==
=== Clergy ===
- Most Rev. Dr. Michael Augustine, Former Archbishop of Pondicherry and Cuddalore., who also served as the Vice-Principal of this school in 1961.
- Most Rev. Dr. Yvon Ambrose, Bishop of Tuticorin,

=== Politicians ===
- Mr M.Ilango, Former Member of the Legislative Assembly

=== Academicians ===
- Prof. Aswath Damodaran, "Dean of Valuation," professor of finance at the Stern School of Business at New York University (Kerschner Family Chair in Finance Education)
