= Daniel Paul Arulswamy =

Indian clergyman and bishop

- Bishop of Kumbakonam
- Church: Catholic Church
- Diocese: Diocese of Kumbakonam
- In office: 5 May 1955 – 16 August 1988
- Predecessor: Peter Francis Rayappa
- Successor: Peter Remigius

Orders
- Ordination: 24 August 1944
- Consecration: 21 September 1955 by Auguste-Siméon Colas

Personal details
- Born: 5 September 1916 Viragalur, Presidency of Fort St. George, British Raj, British Empire
- Died: 12 October 2003 (aged 87)

Daniel Paul Arulswamy (5 September 1916 – 12 October 2003) was an Indian clergyman and bishop for the Roman Catholic Diocese of Kumbakonam. Arulswamy was born in Viragalur. He died on 12 October 2003, at the age of 87. He was the fourth bishop of Kumbakonam from same clergy. The Renowned Social Activist, Father Stan Swamy SJ was also born at his birth place.

== Career ==
Arulswamy became ordained in 1944. He was appointed bishop in 1955.

On 16 August 1988, he resigned from his position as bishop for the Roman Catholic Diocese of Kumbakonam.
