= St. Peter's Pontifical Seminary =

St. Peter’s Pontifical Seminary/Institute
- Former names: Grand Seminaire, St. Joseph’s Seminary, St. Peter’s Regional Seminary
- Type: Pontifical Seminary/Institute
- Established: 1778 at Ulgarpet as Grand Seminary (248 years ago); 1790 moved to Pondicherry as St. Joseph's Seminary (108 years ago); 1934 relocated to Bangalore (92 years ago)
- Affiliations: Pontifical Urban University
- President: Fr. Lawrence
- Dean: Dean of Theology : Fr. Anthony Dias. Dean of Philosophy : Fr. Arnold Mahesh
- Director: Fr. S. Antonysamy (Canon Law)
- Postgraduates: 89
- Doctoral students: 38
- Location: Bangalore, Karnataka, India
- Nickname: St. Peters
- Website: http://www.stpetersseminary.org/

St. Peter's Pontifical Seminary also known as St. Peter's Pontifical Institute of Philosophy and Theology or simply as St. Peter's Pontifical Seminary/Institute is a Roman Catholic major seminary located in Bangalore, India.

After the Suppression of the Society of Jesus in 1773, the Carnatic, Madura and Mysore Missions were entrusted to the Paris Foreign Missions Society. These missionaries started a Seminary under the name Grand Seminaire in 1778, at Ulgarpet, in the outskirts Pondicherry. Rev. Fr. Busson, a former Jesuit, acted as the first Rector of this Seminary. Fr. Magny took charge after him for 40 years. In 1788 that the first ordination took place. At the end of 40 years of Rectorship, Fr. Magny could count 13 ordained priests among the students.

In 1790, the Seminary was transferred to Pondicherry at, what is now Petit Seminaire Higher Secondary School. The Seminary was renamed as St. Joseph's Seminary. In the first 100 years of its existence, 49 indigenous priests were ordained from this seminary. in 1934 the seminary was transferred to Bangalore. Since Pontifical Society of St. Peter the Apostle bore a considerable part of the expenses for the construction of the Seminary building, the new institution was named after St. Peter. In 1942, St. Peter's Seminary was officially declared by the Holy See as a regional seminary.

In 1966 Theology Section building and a new chapel was built. In 1962, the Seminary was affiliated to the Pontifical Urban University of Rome which raised this seminary to the status of Pontifical Seminary. On 12 December 1968, with the recommendation of Paris Foreign Missions Society, the seminary administration was transferred to the local bishops.
