= Roman Catholic Diocese of Coimbatore =

Roman Catholic diocese in Tamil Nadu and Kerala, India

Coordinates: 10.9951°N 76.9652°E

Diocese of Coimbatore Dioecesis Coimbaturensis கோயம்புத்தூர் மறை மாவட்டம்

Location
- Country: India
- Ecclesiastical province: Madras and Mylapore
- Metropolitan: Madras and Mylapore

Statistics
- Area: 28,490 km^{2} (11,000 sq mi)
- Population: Total; Catholics: (as of 2006); 12,124,000; 258,600 (2.1%)

Information
- Rite: Latin Rite
- Cathedral: St. Michael’s Cathedral in Coimbatore
- Patron saint: Michael the Archangel

Current leadership
- Pope: Francis
- Bishop: Thomas Aquinas Lephonse
- Metropolitan Archbishop: George Antonysamy

Website
- Coimbatore Diocese

The Roman Catholic Diocese of Coimbatore (Latin: Coimbaturen(sis)) is a diocese located in the city of Coimbatore in the ecclesiastical province of Madras and Mylapore in India.

== History ==
- 1845: Established as Apostolic Pro-Vicariate of Coimbatore from the Apostolic Vicariate of Madura and Coromandel Coast and Diocese of Madura
- 1850: Promoted as Apostolic Vicariate of Coimbatore
- September 1, 1886: Promoted as Diocese of Coimbatore

== Leadership ==
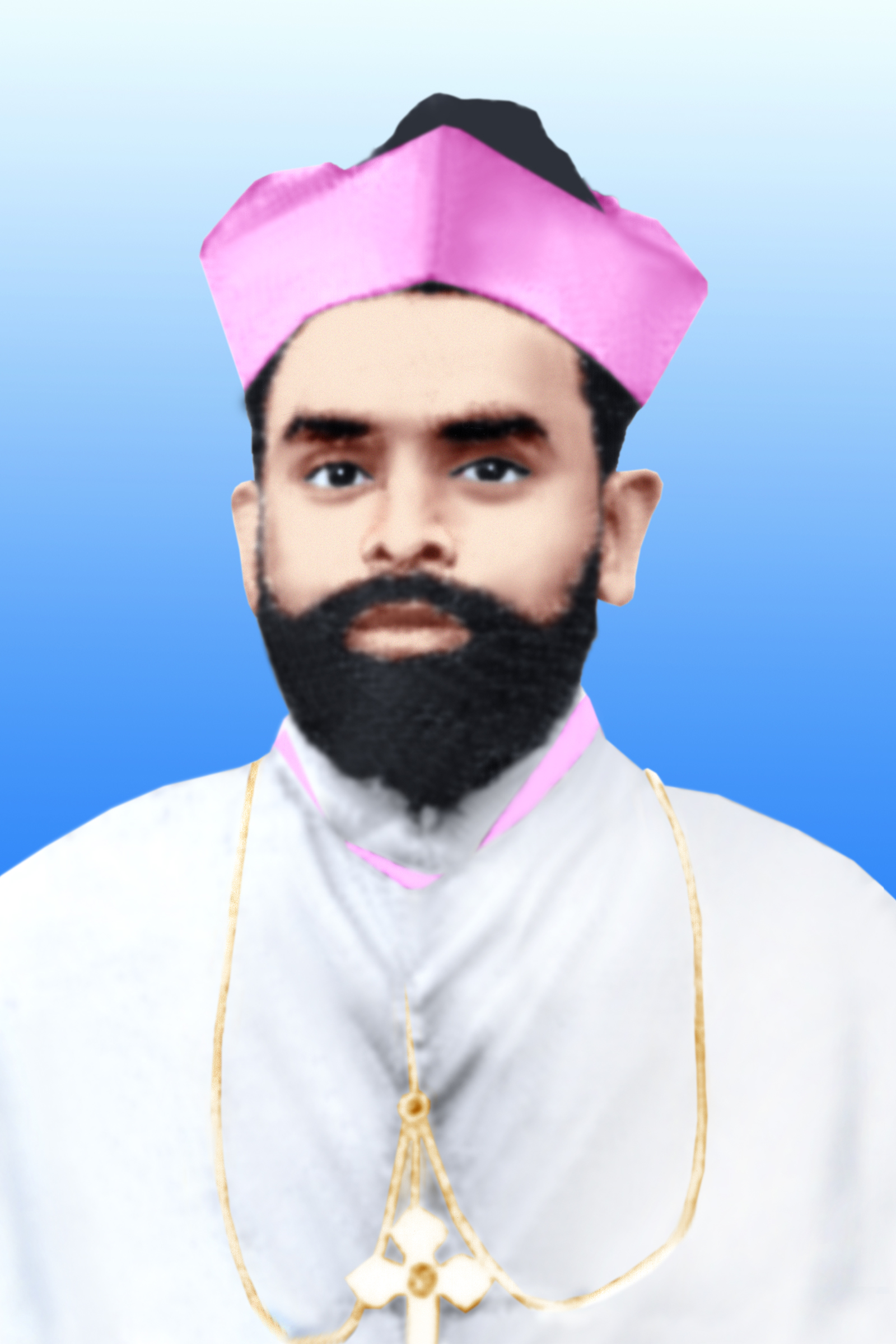
Monseigneur Ubagarasamy Bernadeth, Bishop of Coimbatore from 9 Apr 1940 to 5 Feb 1949

- Vicars Apostolic of Coimbatore (Latin Rite)
  - Melchior-Marie-Joseph de Marion-Brésillac, M.E.P. † (16 Mar 1845 Appointed - 18 Mar 1855 Resigned)
  - Claude-Marie Dépommier, M.E.P. † (17 Feb 1865 Appointed - 8 Dec 1873 Died)
- Bishops of Coimbatore (Latin Rite)
  - Etienne-Auguste-Joseph-Louis Bardou, M.E.P. † (30 Apr 1874 Appointed - 7 Feb 1903 Died)
  - Jacques-Denis Peyramale, M.E.P. † (23 May 1903 Appointed - 17 Aug 1903 Died)
  - Augustine-Antoine Roy, M.E.P. † (12 Feb 1904 Appointed - 4 Dec 1930 Retired)
  - Marie-Louis-Joseph-Constantin Tournier, M.E.P. † (12 Jan 1932 Appointed - Jan 1938 Resigned)
  - Ubagarasamy Bernadeth † (9 Apr 1940 Appointed - 5 Feb 1949 Died)
  - Francis Xavier Muthappa † (25 Dec 1949 Appointed - 23 Nov 1971 Died)
  - Manuel Visuvasam † (3 Feb 1972 Appointed - 2 Jun 1979 Died)
  - Ambrose Mathalaimuthu † (6 Dec 1979 Appointed - 10 Jul 2002 Retired)
  - Thomas Aquinas Lephonse (10 Jul 2002 Appointed - )

== Causes for canonisation ==
- Ven. Melchior de Marion Brésillac
- Fr. Joseph Louis Ravel
