= Savarimuthu Arokiaraj =

Indian Catholic bishop

His Excellency Savarimuthu Arokiaraj
- Bishop of Tiruchirappalli
- See: Tiruchirappalli
- Appointed: 29 June 2021
- Installed: 15 August 2021
- Predecessor: Bishop Antony Devotta

Orders
- Ordination: 8 January 1981
- Consecration: 15 August 2021 by Archbishop Antony Pappusamy

Personal details
- Born: Savarimuthu Arokiaraj; 24 October 1954 (age 72) Lalpettai
- Denomination: Catholic
- Education: St. Peter’s Pontifical Seminary; L'Institut Catholique de Paris
- Motto: Put out into deep sea (Luke 5:4)

Styles of Savarimuthu Arokiaraj
- Reference style: Right Reverend
- Spoken style: Your Excellency
- Religious style: Monsignor

Ordination history of Savarimuthu Arokiaraj
History
Episcopal consecration
- Principal consecrator: Archbishop Antony Pappusamy
- Co-consecrators: Bishop Devadass Ambrose and Bishop Amalraj Arulappan

Bishop Savarimuthu Arokiaraj is the Bishop of the Roman Catholic Diocese of Tiruchirapalli. His canonical appointment as Bishop of Trichy was announced on 29 June 2021 and was consecrated as a bishop on 15 August 2021.

== Early life ==
Bishop Savarimuthu Arokiaraj was born on 24 October 1954 in Lalapettai. He studied Philosophy and Theology at St. Peter Pontifical Seminary, Bangalore (1973–1980). He was ordained priest on 8 January 1981, for the Diocese of Tiruchirappalli. He obtained a Doctorate in Liturgy from L'Institut Catholique de Paris, France (2002).

== Priesthood ==
He served in the following ministries prior to his appointment as Bishop of Trichy:

- 1981: Asst. Parish Priest, St. Joseph's Church, Dindigul;
- 1981–1986: Parish Priest at Ayyampatty;
- 1986–1987: Parish Priest at P. Udayapatty;
- 1988–1991: Secretary of the Diocesan Liturgy Commission;
- 1991–1994: Regional Secretary for the Liturgy Commission of Tamil Nadu Bishops' Council;
- 1994–2002: Higher Studies in France;
- 2002–2008: Secretary of the Liturgy Commission of Tamil Nadu Bishops' Council;
- 2009–2012: Diocesan Chancellor and Parish Priest at Subramaniapuram;
- 2012–2015: Diocesan Chancellor and Professor of Liturgy at St. Paul's Seminary, Tiruchirappalli;
- 2015–2016: Parish Priest of the Cathedral, Tiruchirappalli;
- 2016–2019: Rector of St. Paul's Seminary, Tiruchirappalli;
- 2019–2021: Rector and Parish Priest of Holy Redeemer's Basilica, Tiruchirappalli.

== Episcopal ministry ==
The diocese of Tiruchirapalli became vacant by the retirement of late Bishop Antony Devotta on 14 July 2018. Simultaneously, Pope Francis appointed Bishop Devadass Ambrose Mariadoss of Tanjore as Apostolic Administrator on the same day. The diocese was thus vacant for almost 3 years.

On 29 June 2021, Pope Francis appointed Fr. Savarimuthu Arokiaraj as the new bishop of Tiruchirappalli. He received his episcopal consecration on 15 August 2021 at St. Mary's Cathedral and took possession of the Diocese of Tiruchirapalli on the same day. He was consecrated by Archbishop Antony Pappusamy of Madurai who was the Principal Consecrator and Bishop Devadass Ambrose of Tanjore and Bishop Amalraj Arulappan served as Principal Co-Consecrators. His episcopal motto is "Put out into the deep sea" (Luke 5:4)
