= Diocese of Tiruchirapalli =

Roman Catholic diocese in Tamil Nadu, India

Coordinates: 10.8047°N 78.6916°E

Diocese of Tiruchirapalli Dioecesis Tiruchirapolitanus திருச்சிராப்பள்ளி மறைமாவட்டம்
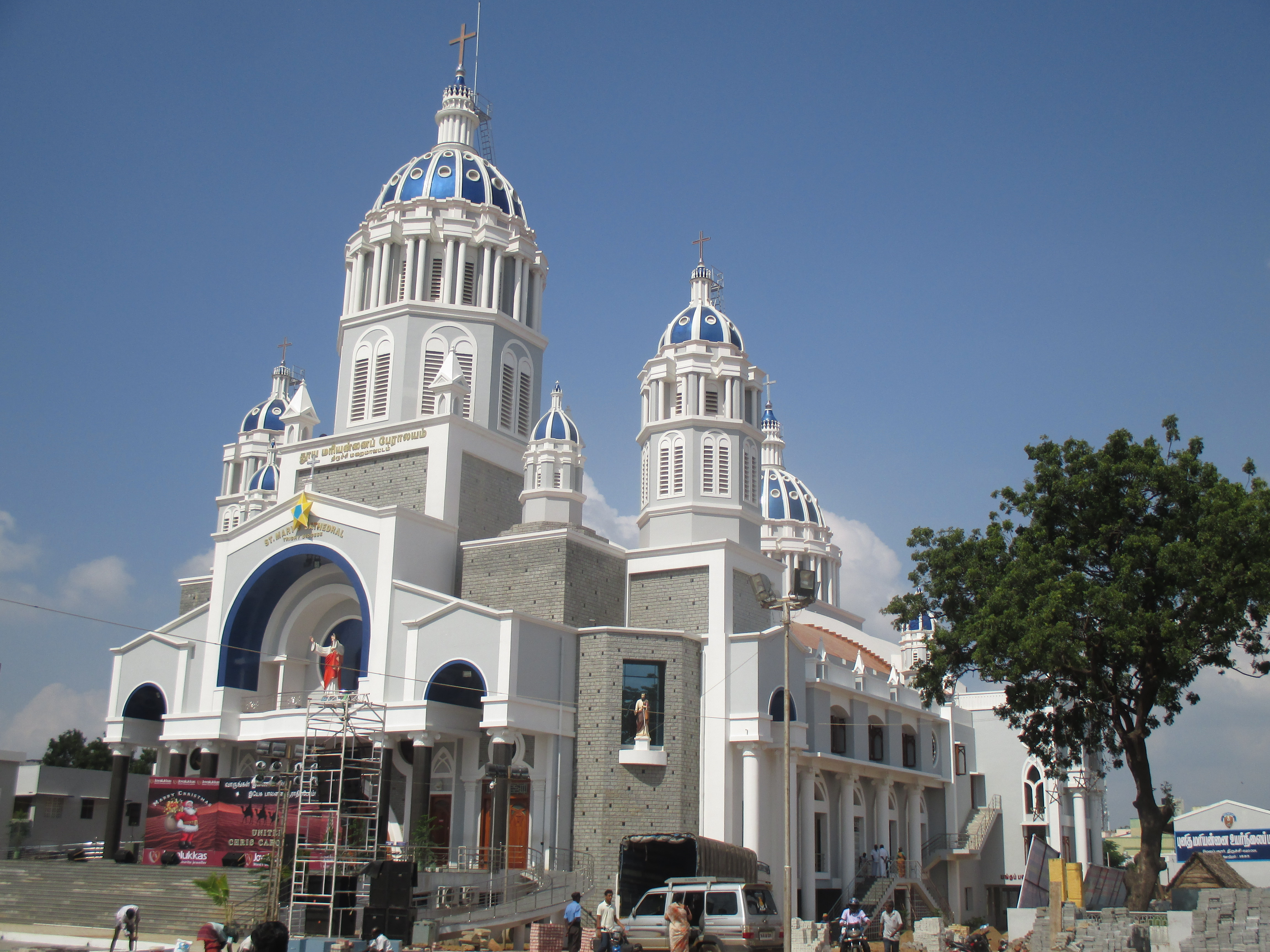
- St. Mary's Cathedral, Tiruchirappalli

Location
- Country: India
- Ecclesiastical province: Madurai
- Metropolitan: Madurai

Statistics
- Area: 5,198 km^{2} (2,007 sq mi)
- Population: Total; Catholics: (as of 2010); 2,156,765; 208,990 (9.8%)

Information
- Rite: Latin Rite
- Cathedral: Cathedral of Our Lady of Health in Tiruchirappalli, aka St. Mary's Cathedral

Current leadership
- Pope: Leo XIV
- Bishop: Savarimuthu Arokiaraj
- Metropolitan Archbishop: Antonysamy Savarimuthu

Website
- Website of the Diocese

The Roman Catholic Diocese of Tiruchirapalli/Trichy (Latin: Tiruchirapolitan(us)) is a diocese located in the city of Tiruchirapalli in the ecclesiastical province of Madurai in India. The episcopal seat is St. Mary's Cathedral, Tiruchirappalli, also known as the Cathedral of the Mother of Good Health.

== History ==
- 1606: Established as Mission “sui iuris” of Madura from the Diocese of Cochin
- 1773: Suppressed
- 1836: Restored as the Apostolic Vicariate of Madura and Coromandel Coast from the Diocese of São Tomé of Meliapore
- 1 September 1886: Promoted as Diocese of Madurai
- 7 June 1887: Renamed as Diocese of Trichinopoly
- 21 October 1950: Renamed as Diocese of Tiruchirapalli

== Special churches ==
- Basilica of the Holy Redeemer, Tiruchirapalli, a minor basilica

== Leadership ==
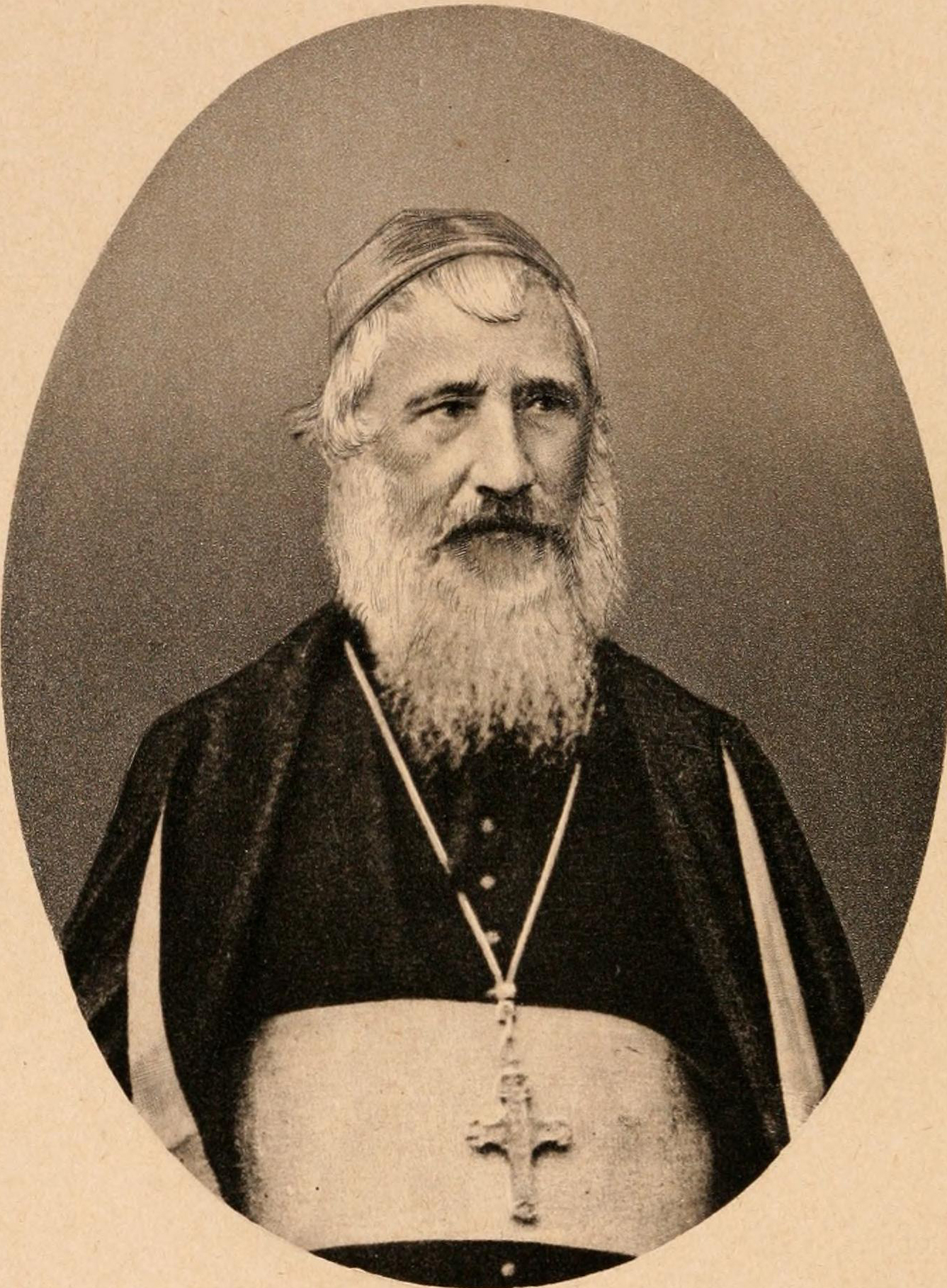
Alexis Canoz S.J., first bishop of Trichy.

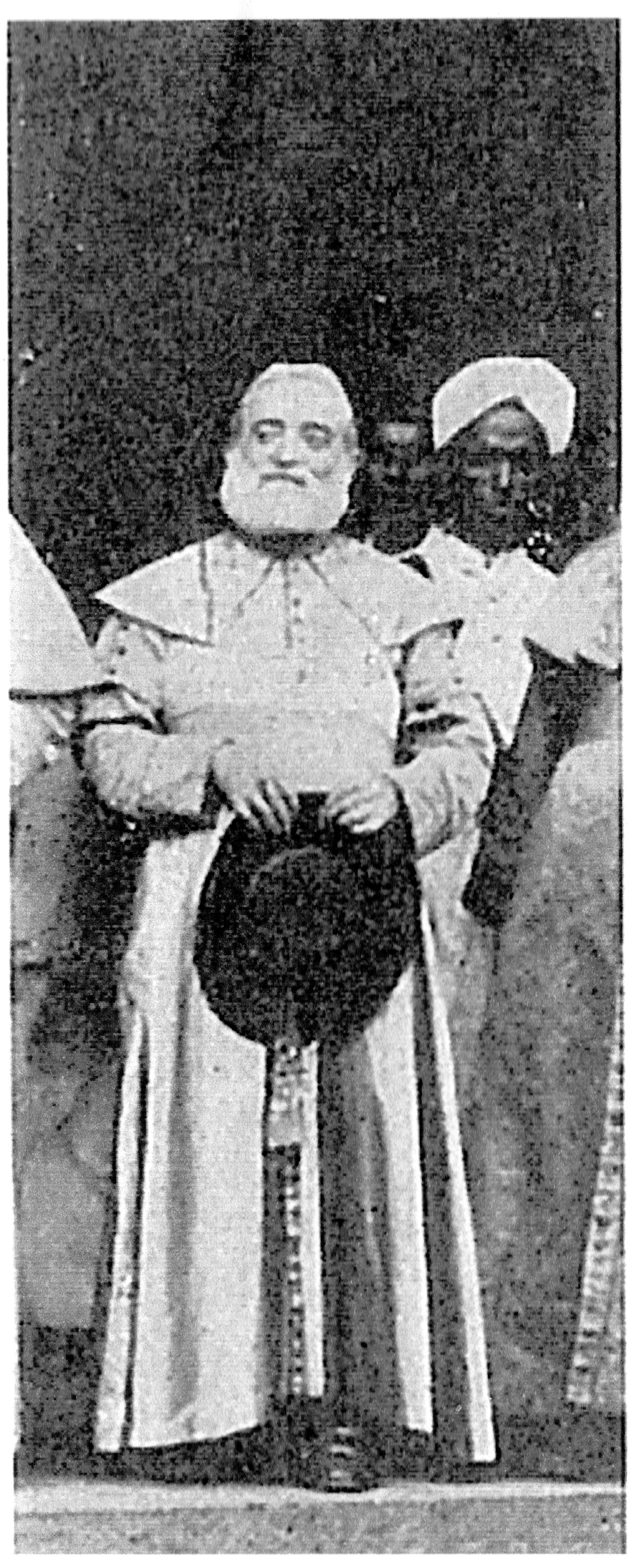
Bishop Jean-Marie Barthe, S.J., Second bishop of Tiruchirapalli

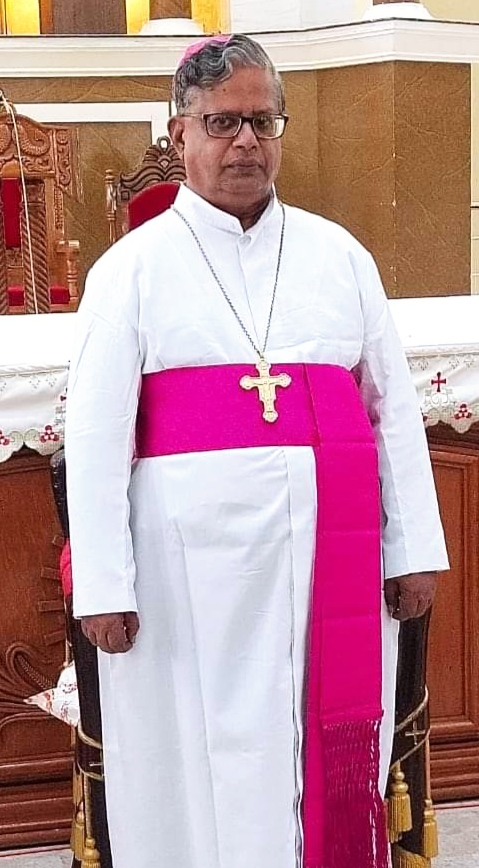
Bishop Savarimuthu Arokiaraj, Bishop of Tiruchirapalli

Bishops of Tiruchirapalli

- Savarimuthu Arokiaraj (15 August 2021 - Incumbent)
- Apostolic Administrator of Tiruchirapalli - Devadass Ambrose Mariadoss (14 July 2018 - 15 August 2021)
- Antony Devotta (28 January 2001 – 14 July 2018)
- Gabriel Lawrence Sengol (30 December 1990 – 14 October 1997)
- Thomas Fernando (24 January 1971 – 30 December 1990)
- James Mendonça (25 July 1938– 24 January 1971)
- John Peter Leonard, S.J. (later Archbishop) (15 March 1936 – 8 January 1938)
- Ange-Auguste Faisandier, S.J. (20 February 1914 – 25 May 1935 )
- Jean-Marie Barthe, S.J. (15 June 1890 – 19 December 1913)
- Alexis Canoz, S.J. (7 June 1887 – 2 December 1888)

Bishops of Madurai

- Alexis Canoz, S.J. (1 September 1886 – 7 June 1887)

Vicars Apostolic of Madura and Coromandel Coast

- Alexis Canoz, S.J. (25 April 1846 – 1 September 1886)
- Clément Bonnand, M.E.P. (3 October 1836 – 3 April 1850)
- Louis-Charles-Auguste Hébert, M.E.P. (8 July 1836 – 3 October 1836)

== Saints and causes for canonisation ==
- Servant of God Annammal Selvanayagam Pillai
- Servant of God Rev. Fr. Antony Soosainather
