= George Antonysamy =

Indian prelate of the Catholic Church (born 1952)

His Grace, the Most Reverend George Antonysamy
- Archbishop of Madras and Mylapore
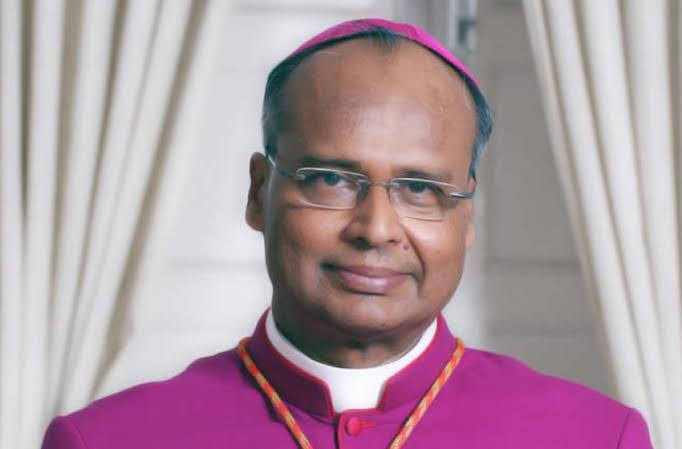
- Church: Catholic Church; Latin Church
- Archdiocese: Madras and Mylapore
- Appointed: 21 November 2012
- Installed: 27 January 2013
- Predecessor: Malayappan Chinnappa
- Other post: Member of the Congregation for the Evangelization of Peoples (November 2020‍–‍present)
- Previous posts: Charge d’Affaires of the Vatican Embassy in Jordan; Titular Archbishop of Sulci; Apostolic Nuncio to Gambia, Liberia, Guinea, and Sierra Leone

Personal details
- Born: 15 February 1952 (age 74) Tiruchirapalli, Madras State, India
- Residence: Archbishop's House, Chennai, Tamil Nadu, India
- Motto: Lumen Fidei (Latin for 'The Light of Faith')

Ordination history
History
Priestly ordination
- Ordained by: Thomas Fernando
- Date: 19 November 1980
Episcopal consecration
- Principal consecrator: Ivan Cornelius Dias
- Co-consecrators: Henryk Franciszek Hoser; Antony Devotta
- Date: 21 September 2005
- Place: St. Mary's Cathedral, Tiruchirappalli
Episcopal succession
Bishops consecrated by George Antonysamy as principal consecrator
- Edward Tamba Charles: 2008
- Andrew Jagaye Karnley: 2011
- Charles Allieu Matthew Campbell: 2011
- Ambrose Pitchaimuthu: 2024

Styles of George Antonysamy
- Reference style: His Grace
- Spoken style: Your Grace
- Religious style: His Grace
- Posthumous style: not applicable

George Antonysamy (born 15 February 1952), is an Indian prelate of the Catholic Church who has been bishop of the Archdiocese of Madras-Mylapore since 2012. He previously served in the diplomatic service of the Holy See.

== Biography ==
Antonysamy was born on 15 February 1952 in Trichy, Tamilnadu. He completed his primary education in Trichy and entered St. Augustine's Minor Seminary. He completed his Bachelor of Philosophy and Master of Theology degrees at the Pontifical Urban University in Rome.

He was ordained a Catholic priest on 19 November 1980. He served as an assistant parish priest at Holy Redeemer's Minor Basilica, Trichy for one year.

In preparation for a career in the diplomatic service, he completed the course of study at the Pontifical Ecclesiastical Academy.

He entered the diplomatic service of the Holy See on 1 March 1987. His early postings included assignments in Indonesia, Algeria, the Central African Republic, Bangladesh, and Lithuania. He became the Chargé d'affaires of the nunciature in Jordan in 2002.

On 4 August 2005, Pope John Paul II named him titular archbishop of Sulci and Apostolic Nuncio to Guinea, Liberia, and Gambia.

He received his episcopal consecration on 21 September 2005 from Cardinal Ivan Dias.

On 20 September 2005 he was named Nuncio to Sierra Leone as well.

He was replaced as Apostolic Nuncio to Guinea by Martin Krebs on 8 September 2008, but continued to hold his other appointments as Nuncio.

On 21 November 2012, Pope Benedict XVI appointed him archbishop of Madras and Mylapore.

In May 2018, he led demonstrations and protested police brutality against Catholic protesters who oppose the expansion of a copper plant. He said the protests "drew inspiration" from the directive Pope Francis' encyclical Laudato si that "the church should return to its mission of ministering to the poor and marginalized, advancing the cause of the environment for those who most depend on it."

In 2018 he was one of four delegates elected by the Indian Catholic Bishops' Conference to participate in the Synod of Bishops on Youth, Faith and Vocational Discernment.

On 12 January 2019 he was re-elected vice president of the Conference of Catholic Bishops of India (CCBI).

Antonysamy speaks several languages including Tamil, English, Italian, French, German, Spanish, Portuguese and Indonesian.
