= Diocese of Tanjore =

Roman Catholic diocese in Tamil Nadu, India

Coordinates: 10.7735°N 79.1405°E

Diocese of Tanjore Dioecesis Taniorensis தஞ்சை மறைமாவட்டம்

Catholic

Location
- Country: India
- Ecclesiastical province: Pondicherry and Cuddalore
- Metropolitan: Pondicherry and Cuddalore

Statistics
- Area: 9,583 km^{2} (3,700 sq mi)
- Population: Total; Catholics: (as of 2010); 4,223,000; 260,800 (6.2%)
- Parishes: 88

Information
- Denomination: Roman Catholic
- Rite: Latin Rite
- Established: 13 November 1952
- Cathedral: Sacred Heart Cathedral in Thanjavur
- Patron saint: Sacred Heart of Jesus; Our Lady of Good Health

Current leadership
- Pope: Leo XIV
- Bishop: Sagayaraj Thamburaj
- Metropolitan Archbishop: Francis Kalist
- Bishops emeritus: Devdadoss Ambrose

Website
- Website of the Diocese

The Roman Catholic Diocese of Tanjore/Thanjavur (Latin: Tanioren(sis)) is a diocese located in the city of Tanjore in the ecclesiastical province of Pondicherry and Cuddalore in India.

== History ==
- 13 November 1952: Established as Diocese of Tanjore from the Diocese of São Tomé of Meliapore

When we trace the history of the Church in India, it is as old as Christianity itself. St. Thomas, one of the twelve Apostles of Jesus Christ brought the Good News of God's Salvation to India. We have quite a few evidences to believe that St. Thomas preached the Gospel on the East and West coast of South India especially in Madras (Chennai) and in the city of Kollam (Quilon) (pronounced Koy-lon) in the present State of Kerala. In 1953, the Diocese of Thanjavur was bifurcated from the Diocese of Mylapore which was established in 1606. Mylapore was the second biggest diocese in India. The Padruado Missionaries by their able leadership and dedicated service led this diocese towards the omega point i.e., "Christ" by bringing many more souls to the Catholic Church. In 1950, Mylapore came under the direct jurisdiction of the Congregation for the Propagation of Faith.

Genesis of the Diocese: The Diocese of Thanjavur was bifurcated from the Diocese of Mylapore on 23 November 1952 by the Holy See, and was erected into a diocese by the Papal Bull Ex Primaevae Ecclesiae.

Missionaries in the Diocese: The territory that constitutes the present Diocese of Thanjavur has been the field of the heroic labour of the Portuguese Padruado Missionaries from Goa, Franciscans, Augustinians, Jesuits, Foreign Missionary Society of Paris (MEP), Salesians and the Diocesan Clergy.

Geography of the Diocese: At Present the Diocese of Thanjavur comprises the entire districts of Thanjavur, Thiruvarur and Nagai (excepting two taluks of Papanasam and Kumbakonam in the district of Thanjavur). It also covers six taluks of Pudukkottai district and two taluks of Cuddalore district.

Shepherds of the Diocese: On 25 March 1953 R.A. Sundaram became the first Bishop of Thanjavur. With his motto "Cor Jesu et Mariae spes mea" and with his special gifts for masterly planning and efficient administration, Sundaram began to build the diocese from scratch. Under his leadership the diocese grew steadily and strongly in every aspect of life. After 33 years of laudable Episcopal ministry, Sundaram retired in 1986. His successor P. Arokiaswamy (called Archbishop) took charge on 26 November 1986 and continued to lead the diocese to realize her goal. After 11 years of fruitful Episcopal ministry he retired in July 1997. M. Devadass Ambrose was consecrated as bishop of Thanjavur on 24 September 1997. He is the third bishop of the Diocese of Thanjavur. Known for his hard work and sincerity he continues to lead the Diocese in the right direction.

Bishops & Priests from the Diocese: When Sundaram started his ministry there were only 48 priests, many of whom were aged. On seeing the urgent need for priests, the Bishop established a minor seminary in 1953 at Thanjavur. Today, this institution is proud to have trained 165 priests during its 46 years of service. The Diocese of Thanjavur is also proud of five of her priests having been elevated to the order of Episcopate. They are Arulaiah, former Bishop of Cuddappa, S.T. Amalanather, former Bishop of Tuticorin and S.L. Gabriel, former Bishop of Trichy, Bishop F. Antonysamy, the Bishop of Kumbakonam and M. Devadass Ambrose, Bishop of Thanjavur. At present, the Diocese has 184 priests among whom nine are retired and the others are working in the vineyard of the Lord with full vigour and zeal.

Religious men & women in the Diocese: Along with the Diocesan clergy, men religious, both Priests & Brothers, also work in different parishes giving witness to their specific charisms. They include the Salesians, Carmelites (OCD), Missionaries of St. Francis De Sales (MSFS) and Sacred Heart Brothers. Along with these men, 481 Religious Sisters belonging to 22 different Congregations also help in the mission of the diocese.

Education: In view of educating the poor children, the Diocese has established 44 orphanages mostly attached to the parishes, which give an integral formation crossing the barriers of caste, religion and language. In all over India the Diocese of Thanjavur runs the highest number of orphanages. There are 103 High Schools and Higher Secondary Schools, middle schools and primary schools and three Industrial Training Centres through which educational services are provided, both academic and technical. St.Antony's Higher Secondary School is an important school which is currently governing by this diocese administration.

Social Service: A remarkable work is done in the field of Social Service. Training programmes, awareness programmes on health & hygiene and Self-development programmes such as credit unions are organized for the social welfare of the population in the diocese. There are two social service centres in the Diocese: Thanjavur Multipurpose Social Service Society – TMSSS having its central office at Thanjavur and Pudukkottai Multipurpose Social Service Society – PMSSS having its central office at Pudukkottai.

Pastoral Ministry: There were only 41 Parishes when the Diocese was started. As the number of souls grew, so arose the need for creating new parishes. At present there are 74 parishes and 948 substations. The Catholic population of the diocese numbers around two hundred thousand (two lakhs; 2,00,000). The pastoral activities in the diocese is vibrant with many independent commissions for Bible, liturgy, catechism, youth animation, social communication, ecumenism & dialogue with non-Christians, etc. It is worth to note that at present the diocese is experiencing a remarkable spiritual renewal and greater participation of the laity in her life and ministry. Many activities are being organized at various levels for a meaningful celebration of the Great Jubilee 2000. A team of priests, sisters, trained mission catechists and lay people visit every parish for Parish Spiritual Renewal Day. Through retreats, seminars and cultural programmes spiritual renewal is brought forth among the Catholic population of the Diocese.

Publications in the Diocese: The Diocese publishes two monthly magazines one in English (Vailankanni Calling) and another in the local language (Vailankanni Kuraloli in Tamil language) to propagate the devotion to Our Lady of Health, Vailankanni. Besides these two magazines there are also other publications in the Diocese as follows: Diocesan News Letter and official letter published every month, Deiva Saptham – monthly publication from the Diocesan Charismatic Centre, Urimai Vazhvu – published from TMSSS and small pamphlets and booklets published from Oli Nilayam, a Catholic Enquiry Centre at Thanjavur.

== Special churches ==
The Basilica of Our Lady of Good Health in Vailankanni is a Marian shrine known as the Lourdes of the East. Pilgrims throng in thousands all through the year. In the sixteenth century, Our Lady appeared to a lame boy in Vailankanni and saved some Portuguese sailors when they were caught in a storm. Many miracles are believed to occur.

== Leadership ==
Bishops of Tanjore

- Rajarethinam Arokiasamy Sundaram (4 February 1953 – 12 September 1986)
- Packiam Arokiaswamy (12 September 1986 – 28 June 1997), personal title of archbishop
- Devadass Ambrose Mariadoss (28 June 1997 – 4 February 2023)
- Sagayaraj Thamburaj (July 12, 2024 - present)
