= Basilica of Our Lady of Good Health, Velankanni =

Basilica of Our Lady of Good Health
- Shrine Basilica Vailankanni
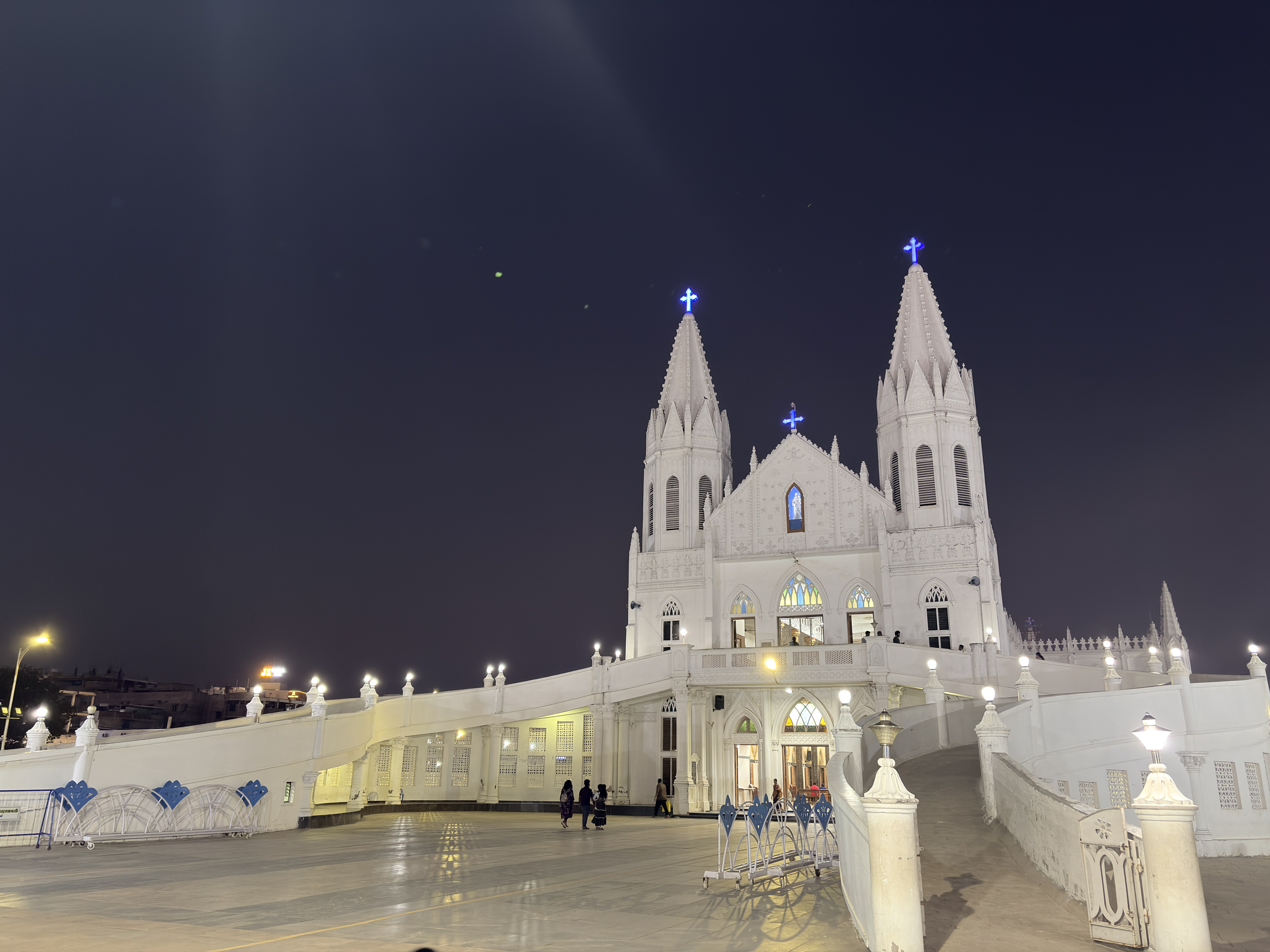
- Façade of the shrine, 2026

- Location within India
- 10°40′48″N 79°50′59″E
- Location: Velankanni, Tamil Nadu
- Country: India
- Denomination: Catholic Church
- Sui iuris church: Latin Church
- Website: https://vailankannishrine.net/

History
- Status: Minor basilica
- Dedication: Our Lady of Good Health
- Consecrated: 1962

Architecture
- Functional status: Active
- Architectural type: Gothic

Administration
- Diocese: Tanjore (Thanjavur)

Clergy
- Archbishop: Francis Kalist
- Bishop: Sagayaraj Thamburaj
- Rector: Rev. Fr. C.Irudayaraj
- Priest(s): Arputharaj S, Vice-Rector and parish priest

The Basilica of Our Lady of Good Health, also known as Sanctuary of Our Lady of Velankanni, is a Christian shrine located at the town of Velankanni, Tamil Nadu, India. The shrine is dedicated to the Blessed Virgin Mary.

The devotion has existed since the mid-sixteenth century, it is attributed to three separate events which occurred at the site: The apparition of the Madonna and Child to a slumbering shepherd boy, the miraculous healing of a handicapped buttermilk vendor and the rescue of Portuguese sailors from a deadly sea storm.

Initially, a modest chapel was built by the Portuguese from Goa and Bombay, soon after they washed ashore safely in spite of a severe tempest. An annual novena is celebrated and draws nearly 5 million pilgrims each year.

Pope John XXIII raised the Marian shrine to the status of a minor basilica via the pontifical decree Salutem Supplicibus Dilargiens, signed & notarised on 3 November 1962. He called the shrine "the Lourdes of the East" due to the massive influx of pilgrims.

== History ==
There were three Marian apparitions, of the Virgin-Mother Mary at Velankanni in the 16-17th centuries, according to oral lore and popular writings. The third noteworthy incident is the reported miraculous rescue of the Portuguese from Goa and Bombay, who were attempting to navigate through a deadly monsoon tempest in the Bay of Bengal in the late 17th century.

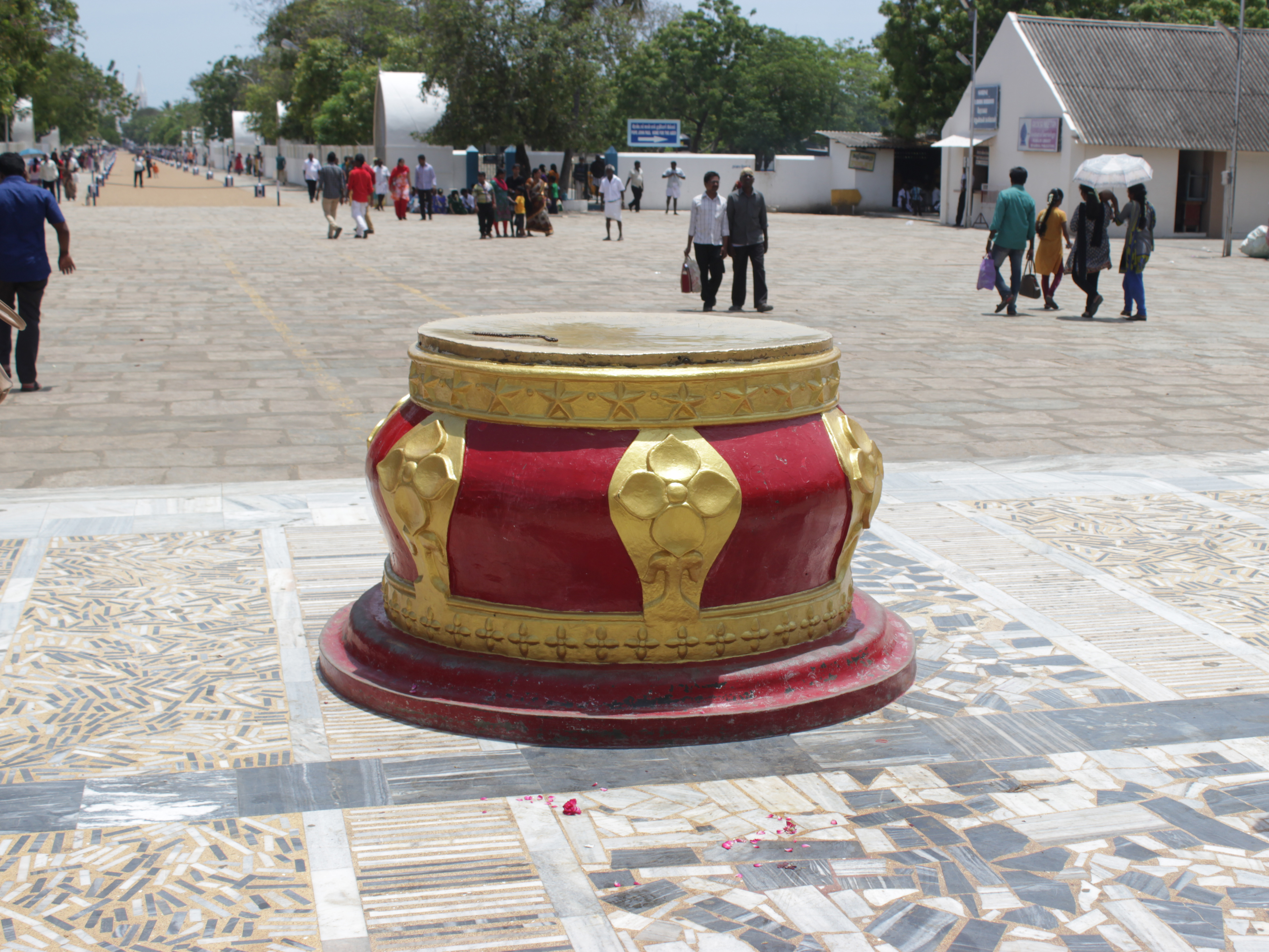
This well/pool is situated where the first apparition had occurred.

The first Marian apparition is said to have occurred in May 1570, when a local shepherd boy was delivering milk to a nearby house. Along the way he met a beautiful woman holding a child, who asked for some milk for the child. After giving her some milk, he continued on under the hot tropical sun, upon finishing his deliveries he found that the jug was still full of fresh and cool milk. A small shrine was built near the site where the boy encountered the woman, a location that came to be called Maatha Kulam, which means "Mother's well" in the Tamil language.

The second Marian apparition is said to have happened in 1597, not far from Maatha Kulam. A beautiful woman with a child in her arms appeared to a crippled boy selling buttermilk. The child asked for a drink of buttermilk. After he drank it, the woman told the boy to visit a gentleman in the next town and ask him to build a chapel in her honour at that location. As the boy set out he realised he had been healed and was no longer lame. A small thatched chapel was built shortly thereafter in honour of "Our Lady of Good Health" or Aarokia Maatha in Tamil.

The third notable incident occurred when a Portuguese ship sailing from Macao to Ceylon (Sri Lanka) was caught in extreme weather in the Bay of Bengal. Fearing for their lives, the ship's crew invoked the aid of the Virgin Mary under her title Star of the Sea. The raging storm suddenly subsided, the entire crew of 150 on board the ship were saved from capsizing & reached the shore of Velankanni. This happened on 8 September, the feast day of the Nativity of Mary. In thanksgiving, the sailors rebuilt the shrine, continued to visit and donate to the cause of the shrine whenever their voyages brought them to the area.

The shrine that began as a thatched chapel in the mid-sixteenth century and became a parish church in 1771, when Indian Catholics were persecuted in the erstwhile Dutch Coromandel, after the Luso-Dutch war was waged by Dutch Protestants.

In August 2024, the Dicastery for the Doctrine of the Faith's Cardinal Víctor Manuel Fernández confirmed to Bishop Sagayaraj Thamburaj, Pope Francis' approval of the devotion to Our Lady of Good Health at the Basilica of Our Lady of Good Health.

== Significance and pilgrimage ==
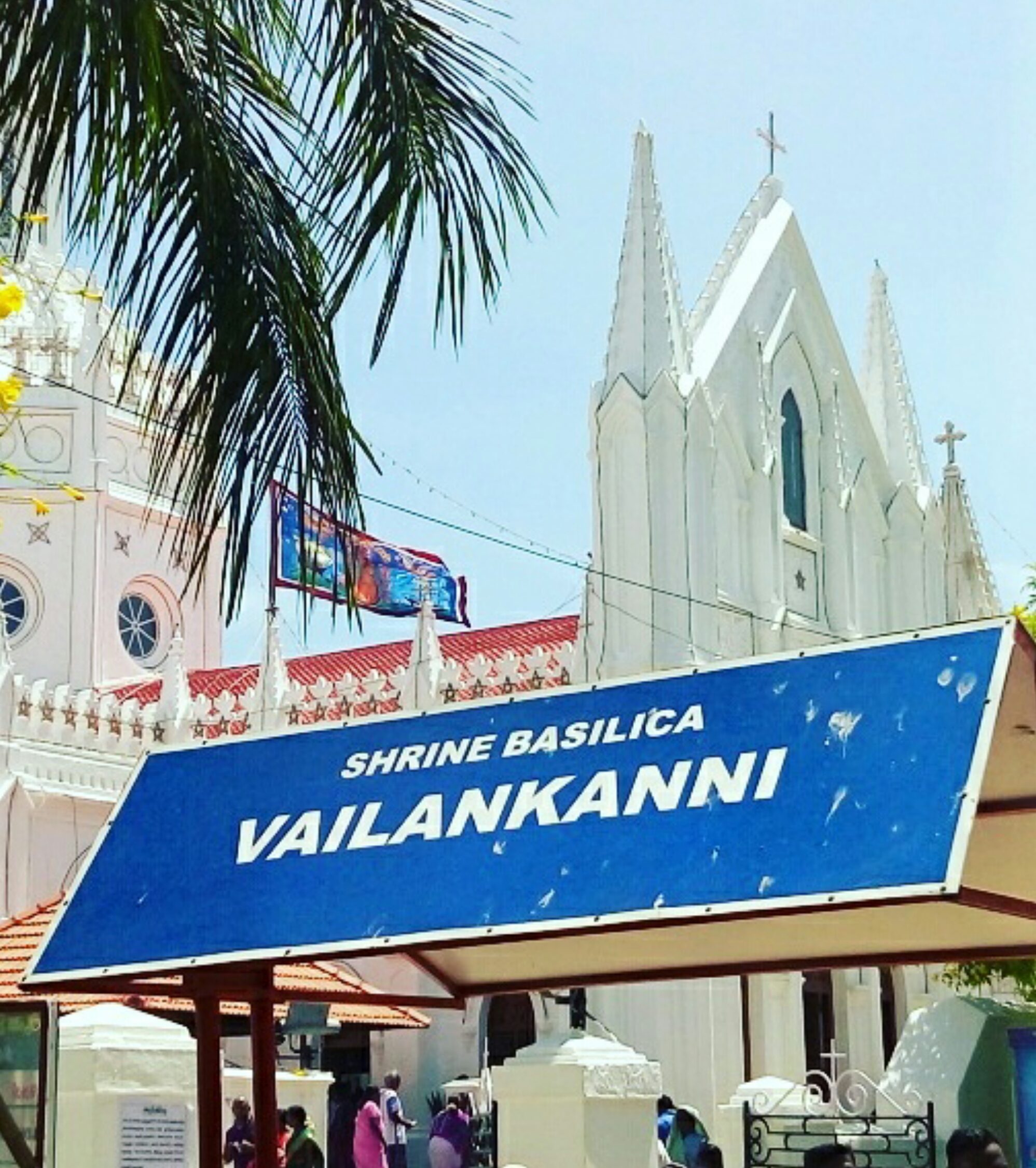
The basilica with a flag visible in the background

The basilica featured a flagstaff, called as a Kotimaram or Dwajasthamba, which has been described as an extended influence of Hindu traditional practices on Catholicism in India.

The church is dedicated to Our Lady of Good Health. The Virgin Mary is depicted wearing a sari. The usual times for pilgrimage are during the annual festival between 29 August to 8 September, Holy Week and Christmas. Some pilgrims, instead of using a mode of transport, perform "walking pilgrimages" to it. They attend mass, novenas, flag-hoisting and carry a palanquin of Mary in a procession. A major event is the procession, where only women are allowed to pull the first car and a statue of Mary is in the last and most decorated one. People of other religions also take part. The pilgrims sometimes shave their heads as an offering and perform ear-piercing ceremonies, both being originally Hindu traditions done in devotion to divinity. Another ritual considered sacred is dipping oneself in the pond. There is a holy flag which is lowered to signal the end of the festival.

Due to the number of pilgrim visits during festival season, the Indian Railways introduced special train services to the town of Velankanni.

== Architecture ==
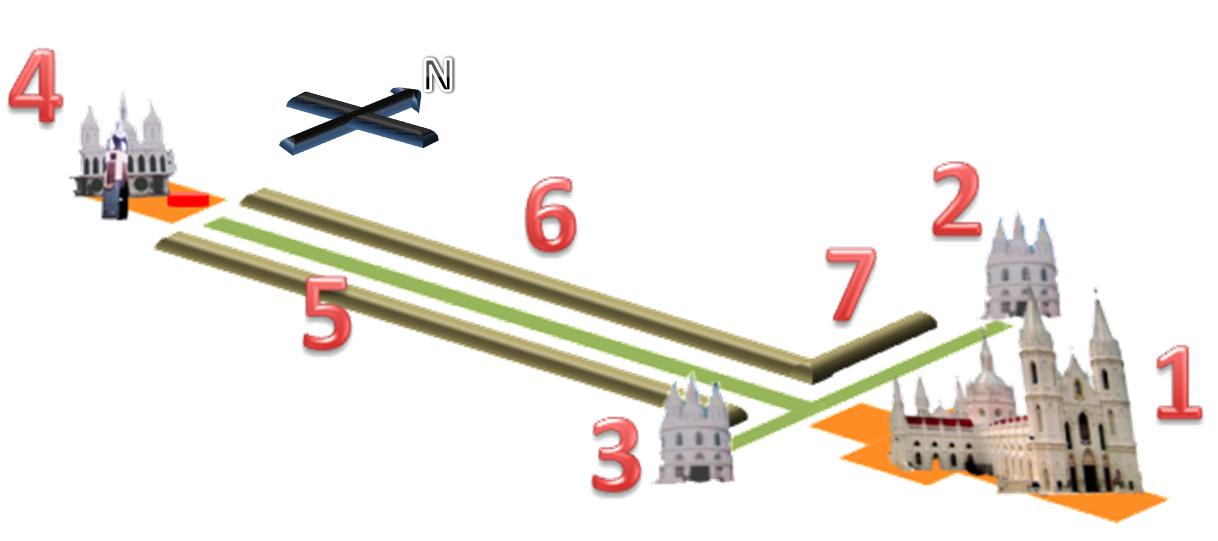
Layout of the basilica complex: 1. Basilica, 2. Nadu Thittu shrine, site of second apparition, 3. Adoration & Reconciliation chapel, 4. Our Lady's Pond, site of first apparition, 5. Stations of the Cross, 6. Mysteries of the Rosary, 7. the Sacraments

The basilica is built in the Gothic style of architecture. The southern side was extended in 1928 and the northern in 1933. The Shrine Basilica contains three chapels, as well as Our Lady's Tank, Church Museum, Priests' Residence, Offering Center, Stations of the Cross, mysteries of the rosary, Shrine Mega Mahal and Vailankanni Beach. The building is painted in white, except for the roof that is made of red tiles.

Annai Velankanni Church

Annai Velankanni Feast 2012

The early part of the 20th century marked rivalry between Jesuits and Franciscans regarding their influence on missionary work in Velankanni. In 1928, the Jesuit Church of the Immaculate Heart of Mary was demolished and the statues were brought to the Shrine of Our Lady of Good Health; in 1933 the shrine was expanded with two new wings, to the right and to the left of the 'Main Altar', meeting the nave at right angles.

A spacious vestry was provided immediately behind the altar. Thus the entire sacred edifice began to assume the shape of a Latin cross. Right over the center of the ancient main altar was the miraculous image of Our Lady of Good Health.

In 1956, a new welcome arch was blessed and opened by Bishop Rajarethinam Arokiasamy Sundaram. The illuminated arch stood to show the way to eager pilgrims who sought the protection of Mary. In January 1961, a new central altar, executed in white marble, replaced the former one made of cement concrete. In 1974–75, an extension of the basilica was built behind the existing central altar to accommodate the multilingual pilgrims. The extension included a two-storied church with 93 feet (28 m) high dome and 82 feet (25 m) high gothic spirals. It was designed to resemble the Basilica in Lourdes, France.

== List of parish priests ==
The basilica first became a parish in 1771. The list of parish priests (mainly Portuguese) from 1771 until now is as follows:

List of Parish priests of the basilica
S.no	Year	Month	Parish Priest	Notes
1	1771	Sep	António do Rosário	
2	1774	Aug	José de Santa Rosa de Viterbo	
3	1777	Jul	António do Rosário, Commissary	
4	1779	Sep	Luís dos Remédios	
5	1783	Jan	António do Rosário, Commissary	
6	1788	Dec	António de Jesus Maria José	
7	1789	Sep	António do Rosário, Commissary	
8	1792	Sep	José de Santa Rosa de Viterbo, Commissary	
9	1814	May	Constaantino de Jesus Maria, Commissary	
10	1819	May	Tomás da Piedade	
11	1822	Feb	Francisco Xavier Mascarenhas	
12	1822	Aug	Francisco das Dores	
13	1824	May	Felipe de Jesus	
14	1825	Sep	Francisco Dos Dores	
15	1828	Jun	Felipe de Jesus	
16	1829	May	Clemente das Dores	
17	1847	Oct	Isidoro Manuel Alemão	
18	1858	Apr	José Felix Fernandes, AG.PP	
19	1863	Nov	Felipe de Nery Joaquim Dias	
20	1876	May	Inácio António de Andrade	
21	1886	Aug	Miguel Francisco Fernandes	
22	1890	Dec	Joaquim José, Ag. P. Vic. Nagapattinam	
23	1891	Feb	Guilherme José Dias	
24	1892	Dec	Joaquim José Luís, Ag. P. Vic. Nagapattinam	
25	1893	Mar	Martinho Valeriano de Sá	
26	1899	Sep	Joaquim Francisco da Piedade Dias	
27	1900	Aug	Camilo Fernandes	
28	1910	Jun	Sebastião Xavier de Noronha	
29	1942	Sep	M. V. Rodrigues	
30	1963	Jun	S. Maria Soosai	
31	1980	Sep	Tomás Vaz	
32	1982	Sep	S. L. Gabriel	
33	1990	May	M.M. Sammanasu	
34	1997	Jun	G. Arul Iruthayam	
35	2003	Jun	P. Xavier	
36	2009	Jun	A. Michael	
37	2015	Jun	A.M.A. Prabakar	
38	2021	Nov	C. Irudayaraj	

== Gallery ==
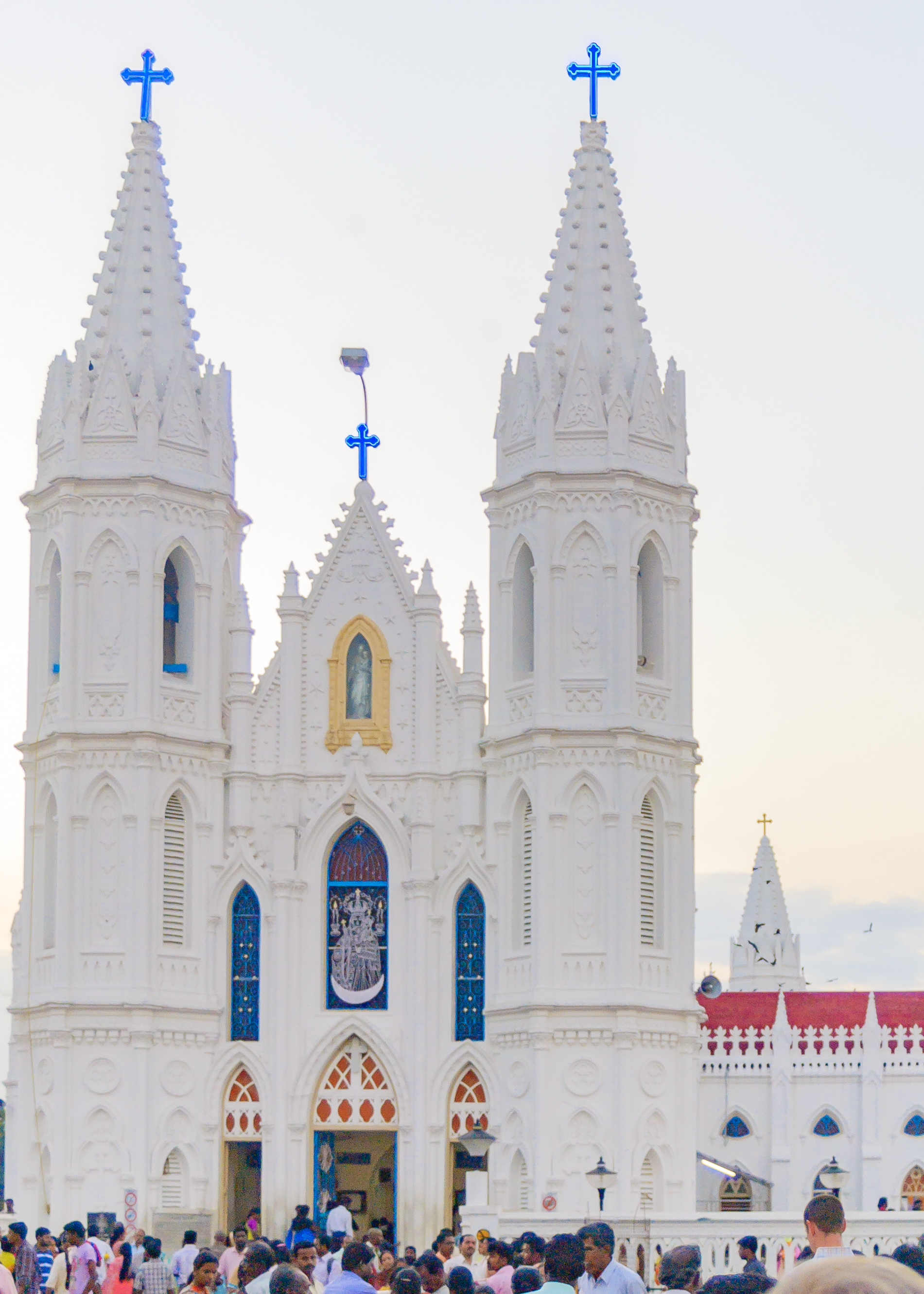
Basilica of Our Lady of Good Health in Velankanni, Tamil Nadu - entrance

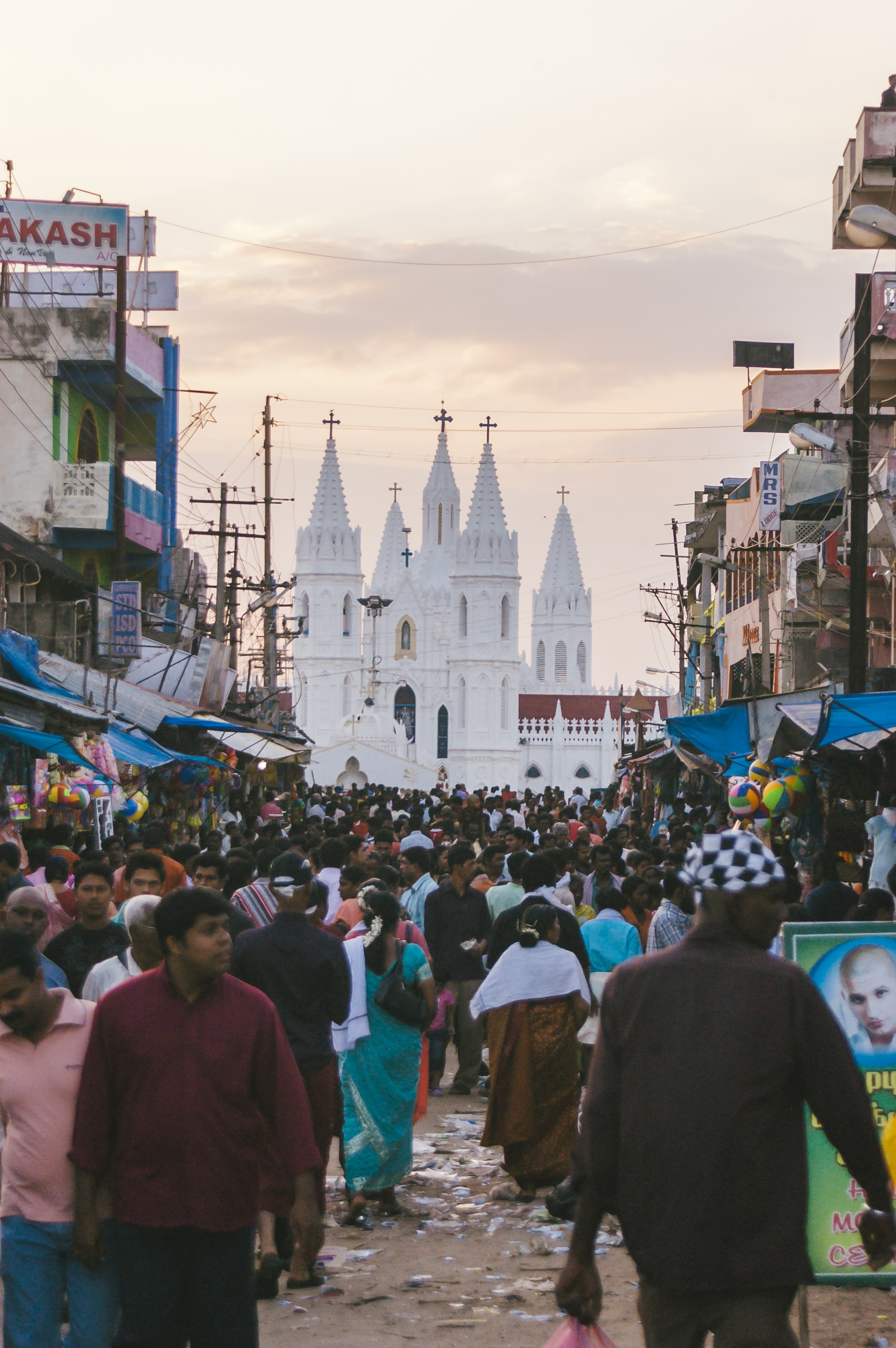
Basilica of Our Lady of Good Health in Velankanni, Tamil Nadu

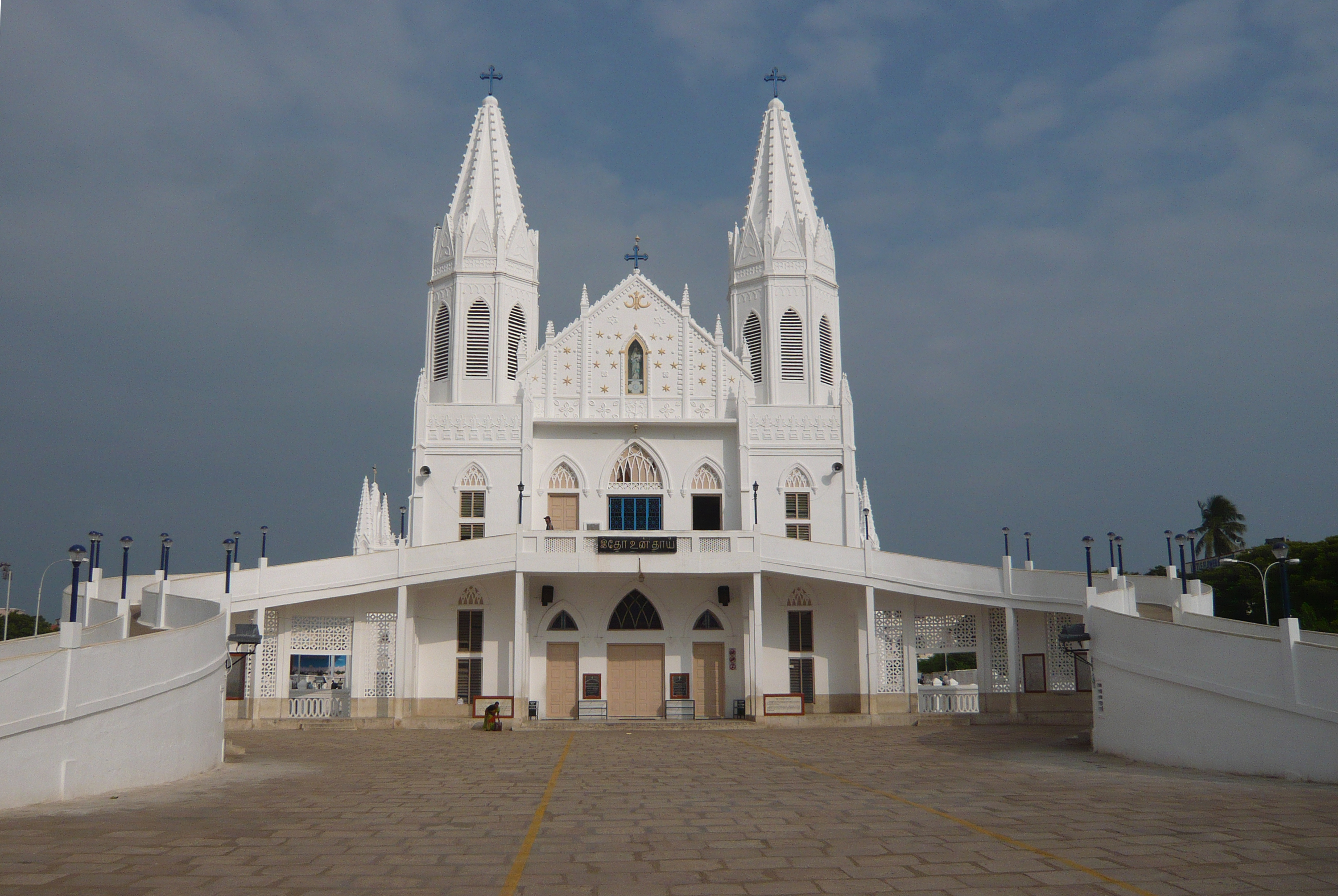
Velankanni - basilica extension

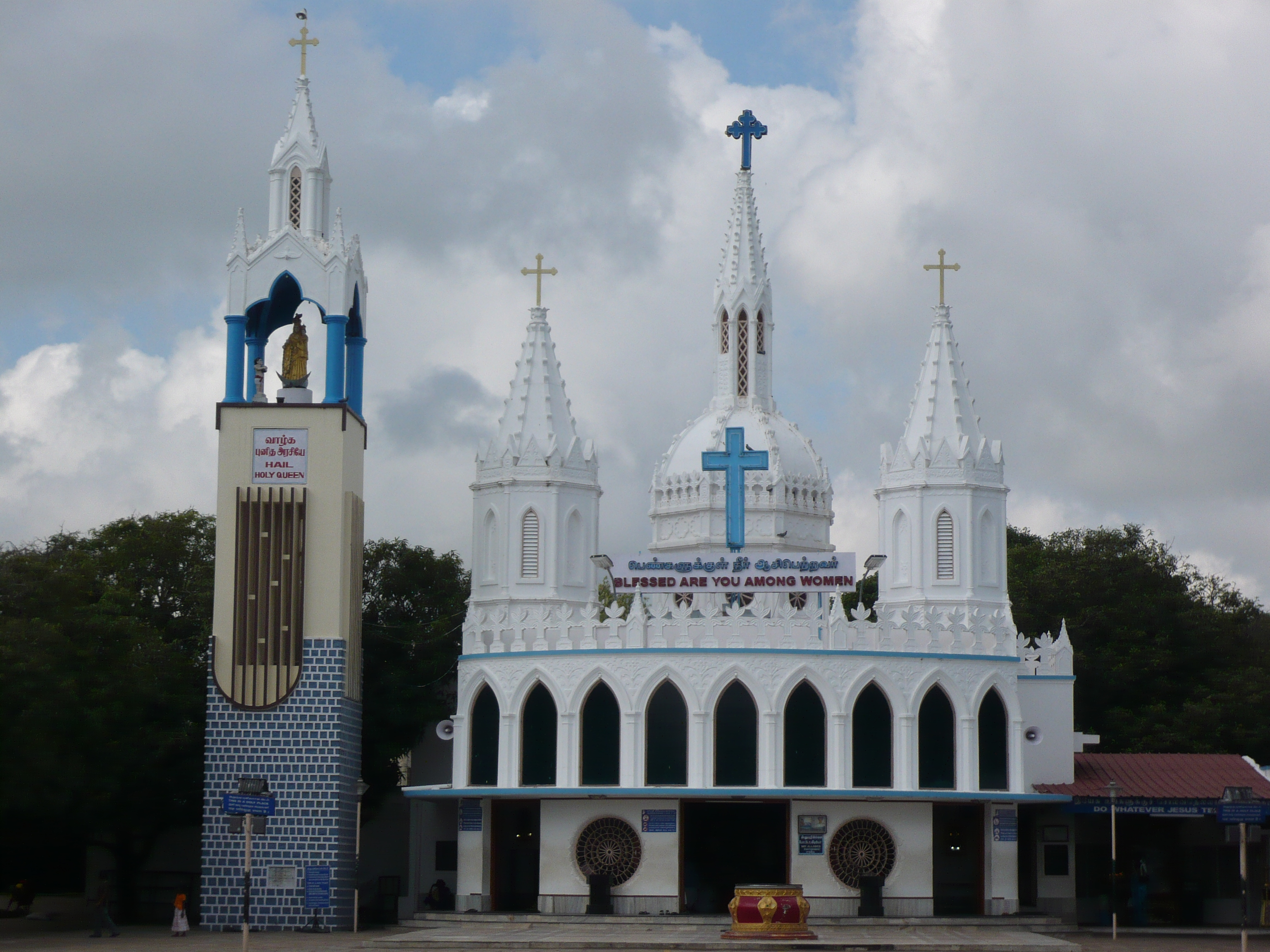
Velankanni Church pond

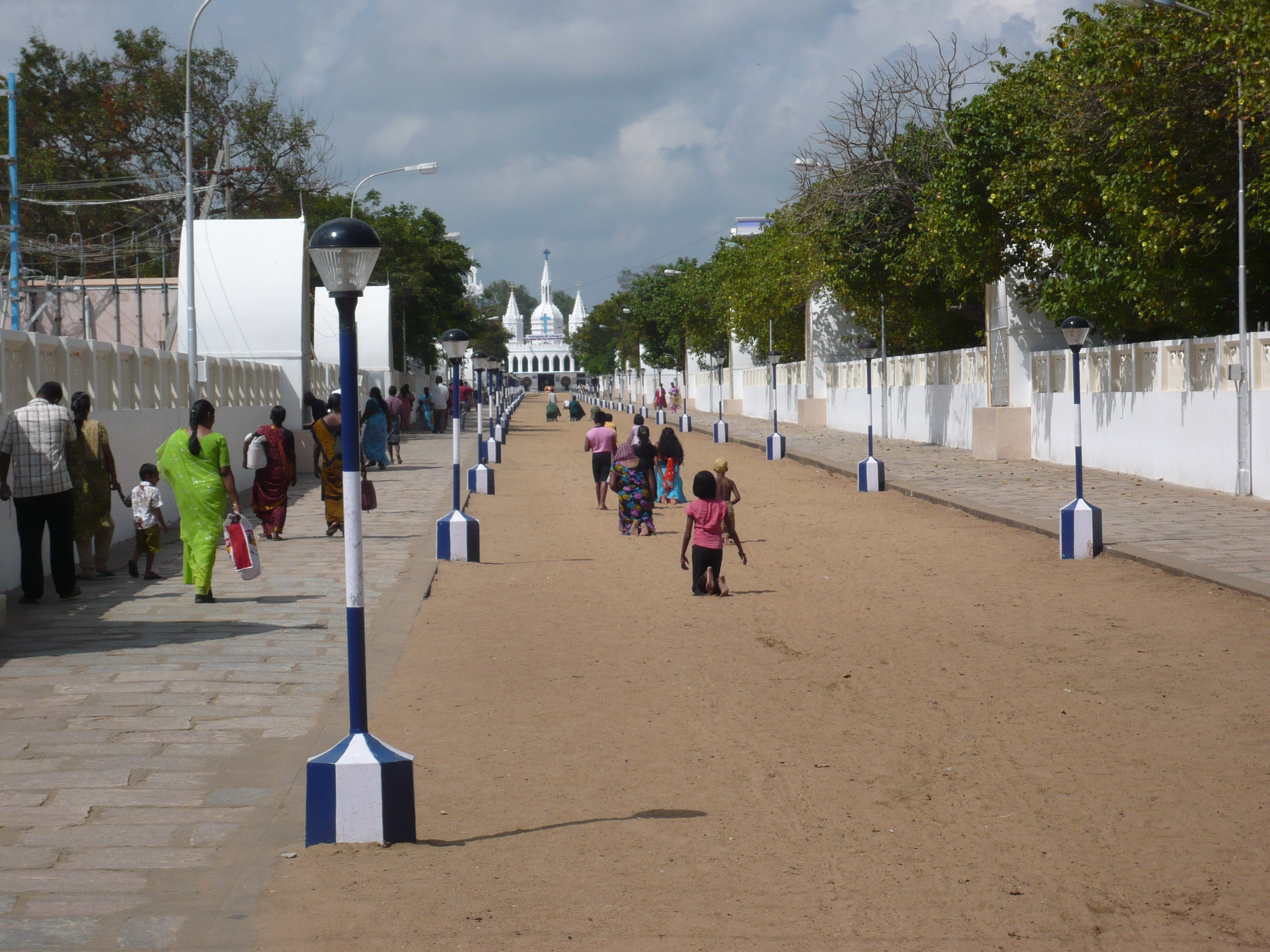
Pilgrims walking on their knees towards the pond

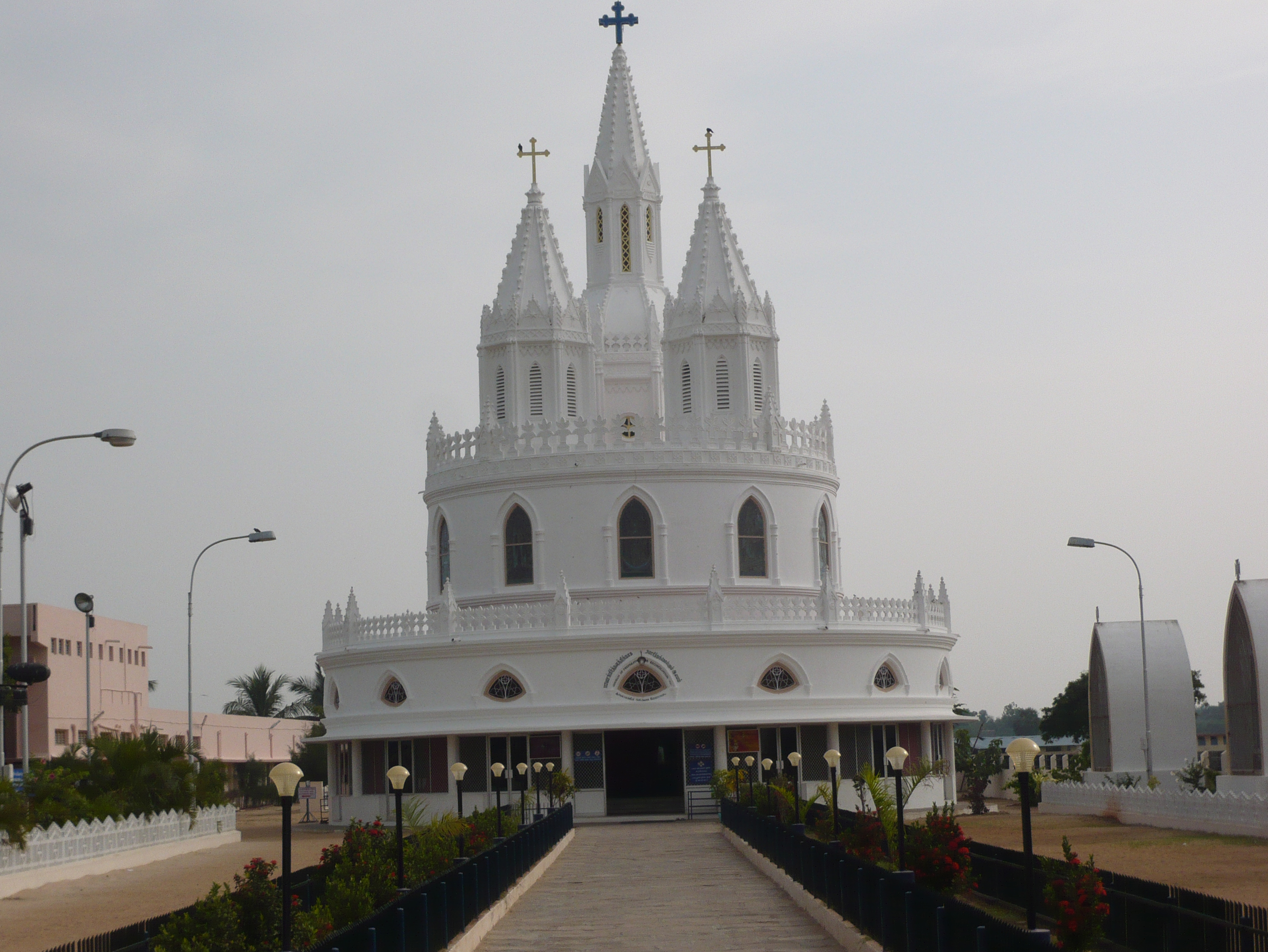
Velankanni - Adoration Center

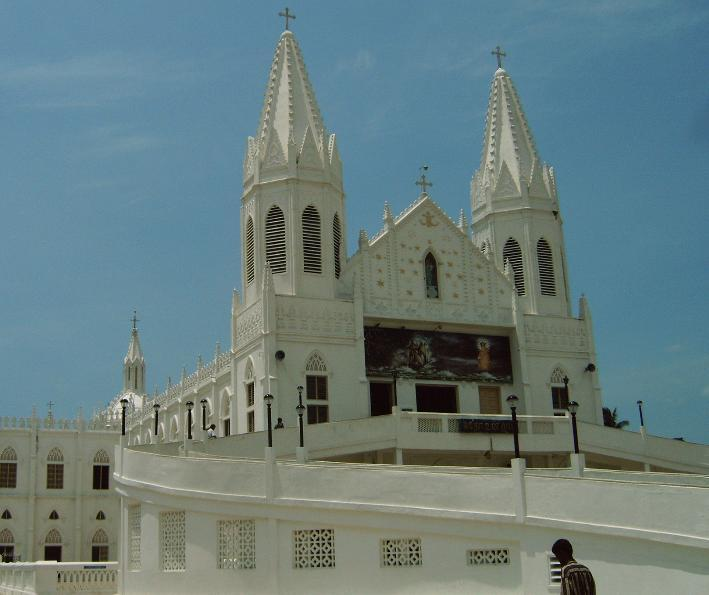
Velankanni Basilica

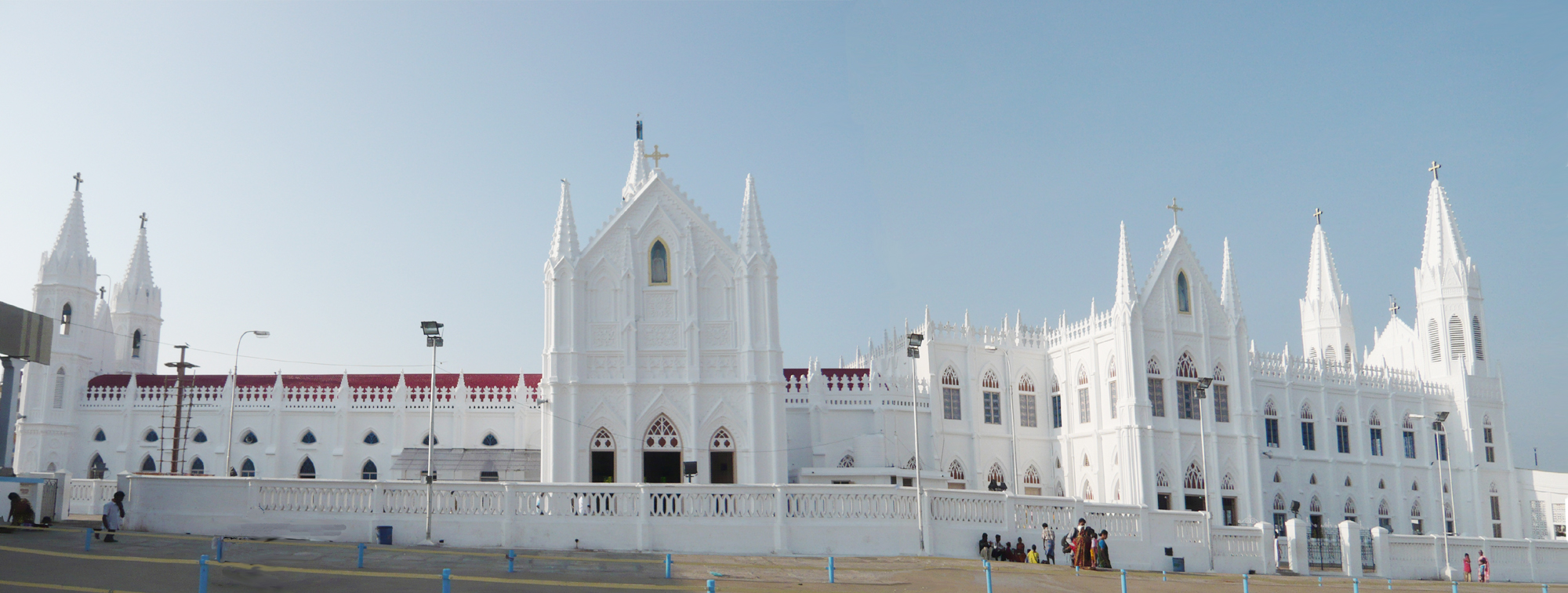
Velankanni Basilica - a panoramic side view - church and church extension seen at a stretch

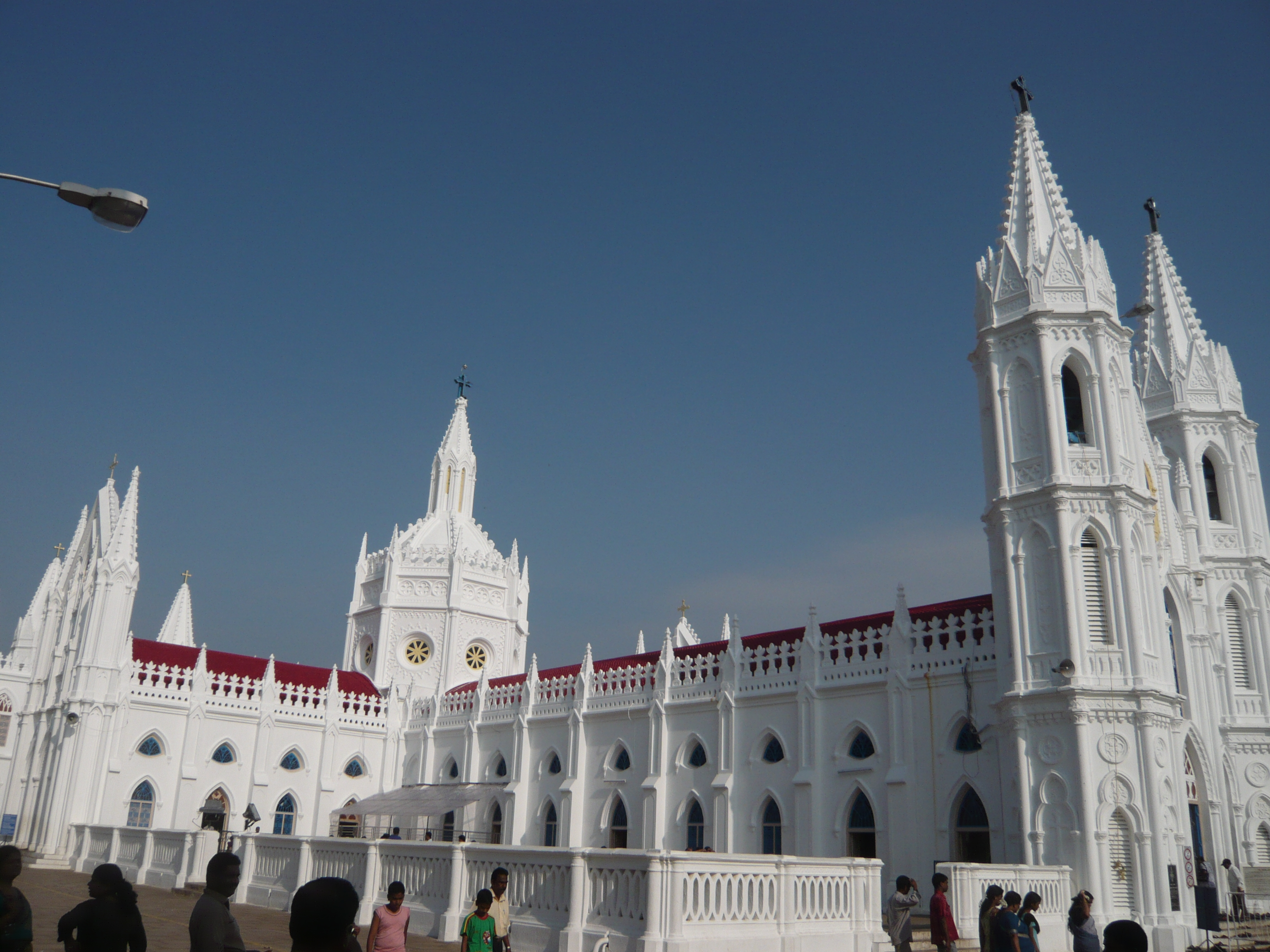
Velankanni Basilica - side left side view

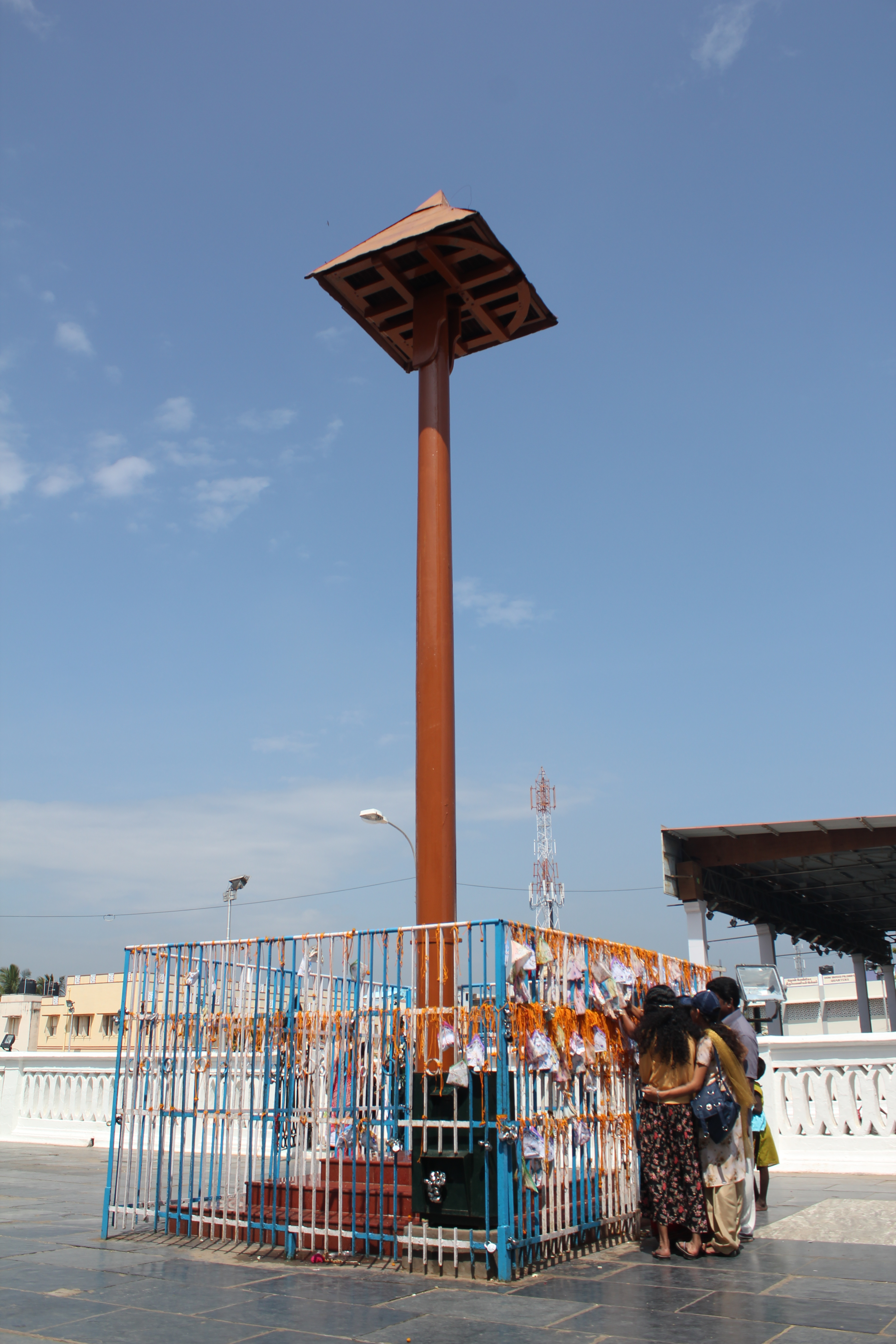
Flag pole at the church

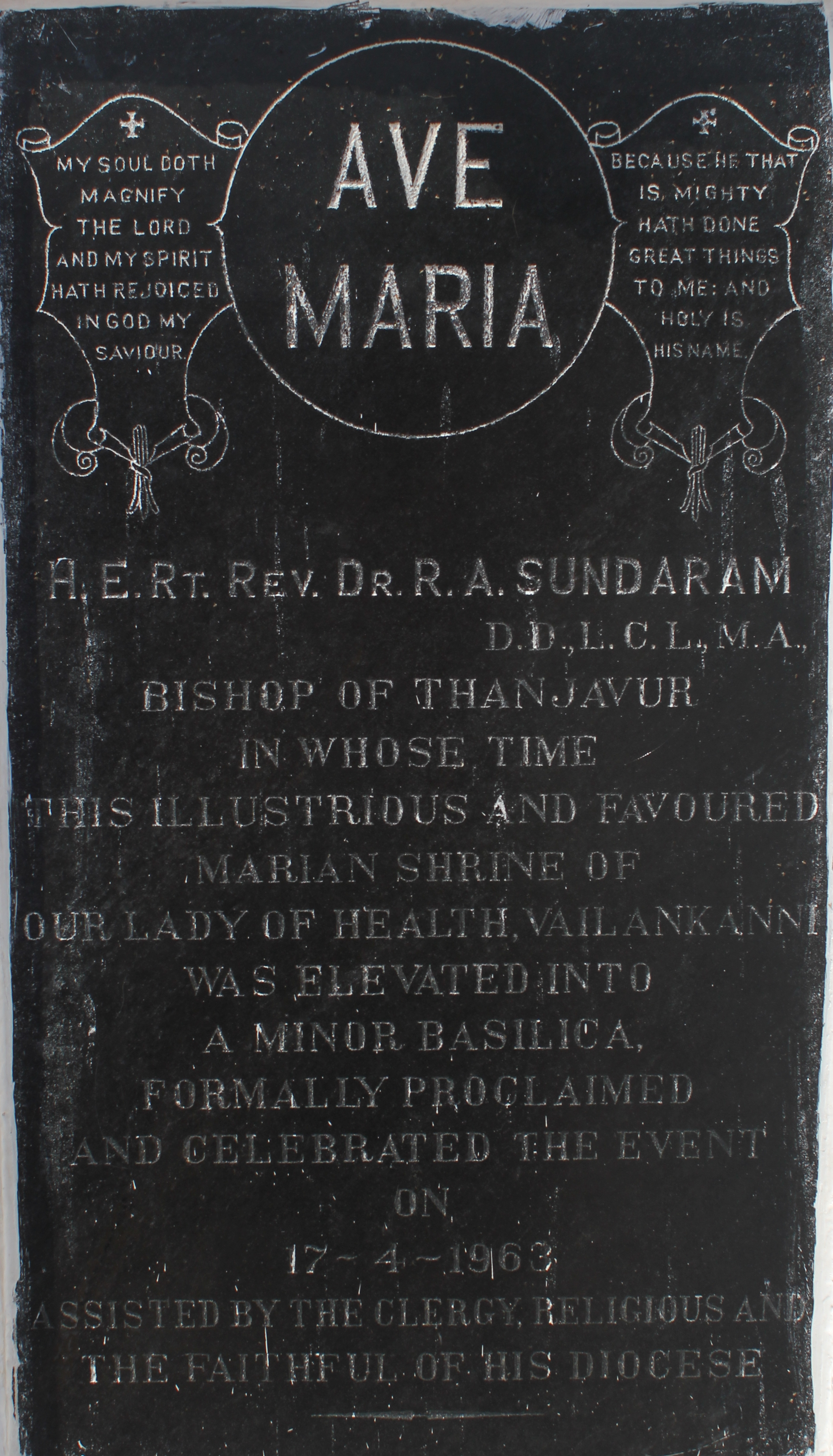
Velankanni apostolic brief

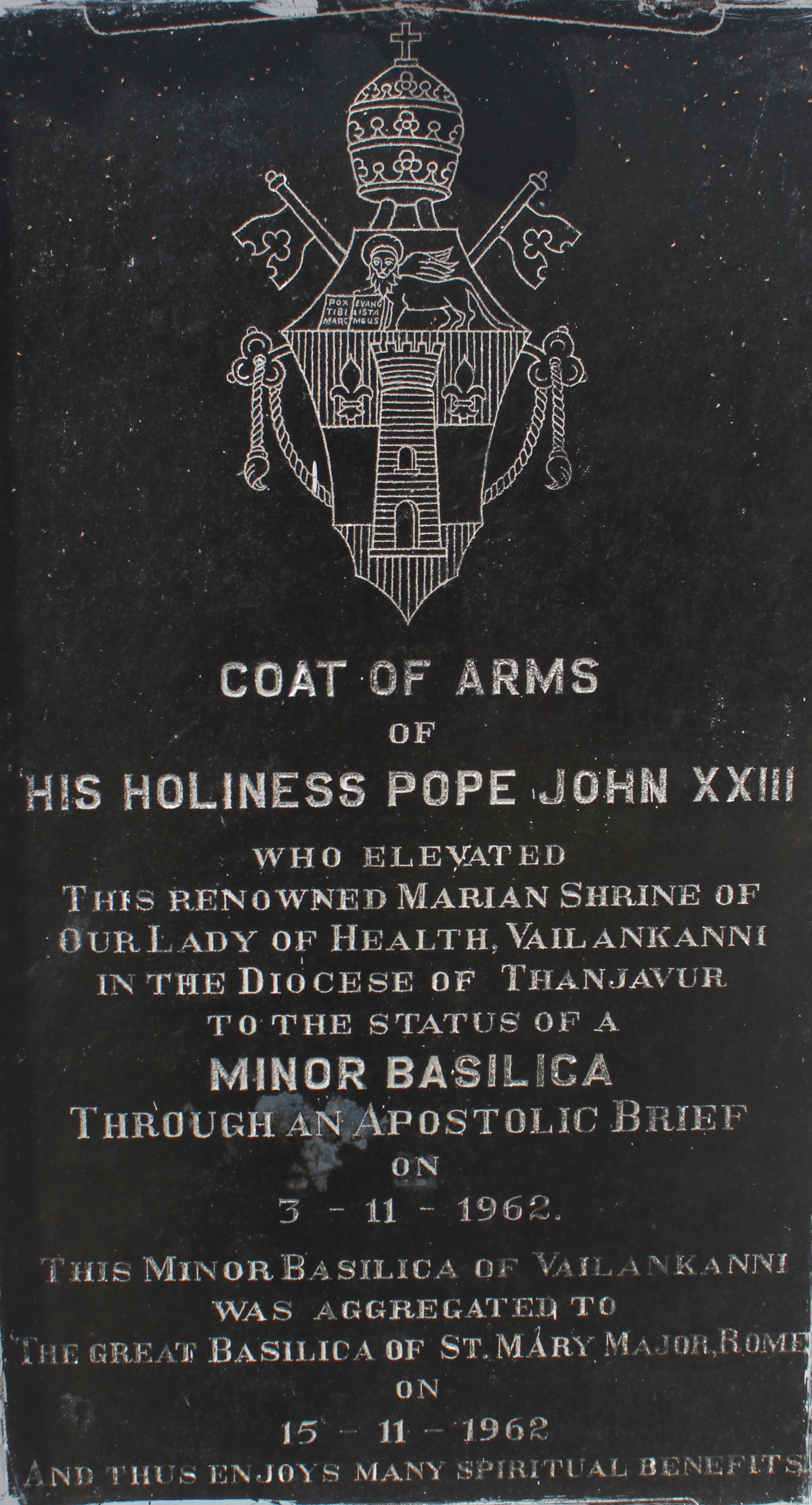
Velankanni proclamation Inscription

== In popular culture ==
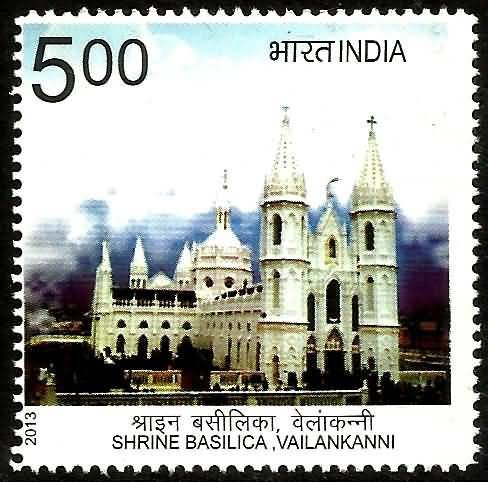
2013 stamp of India showing the Basilica of Our Lady

The basilica is a recurring setting in the Tamil film Annai Velankanni (1971). It also appears as a minor setting in the Malayalam-Tamil bilingual film Nanpakal Nerathu Mayakkam (2022) and the Malayalam film Pulimada (2023).

== See also ==
- Roman Catholic Diocese of Tanjore
- List of basilicas in India
- Basilica of Our Lady of Health, Harihar
- Marian apparition
- Christianity in Tamil Nadu
