= Packiam Arokiaswamy =

Indian Roman Catholic bishop

- (Arch)Bishop of Tanjore
- Church: Catholic Church
- Diocese: Diocese of Tanjore
- In office: 12 September 1986 – 28 June 1997
- Predecessor: Rajarethinam Arokiasamy Sundaram
- Successor: Devadass Ambrose Mariadoss
- Previous posts: Archdiocese of Bengaluru (1971-1986); Bishop of Ootacamund (1971)

Orders
- Ordination: 12 December 1946
- Consecration: 28 April 1971 by Duraisamy Simon Lourdusamy

Personal details
- Born: 20 February 1921 Kombeikadu (north of Yercaud), Presidency of Fort St. George, British Raj, British Empire
- Died: 22 May 2003 (aged 82)

Archbishop Packiam Arokiaswamy (20 February 1921 – 22 May 2003) was an Indian prelate and bishop for the Roman Catholic Diocese of Tanjore. Born in Kombeikadu in 1921 he was ordained a priest in 1946. On 16 January 1971, he was nominated as Bishop of Ooty and was consecrated as bishop on 28 March 1971. However within a few months, on 6 December 1971, he was promoted to Archdiocese of Bengaluru. He was appointed bishop of Tanjore on 12 September 1986. Though he was appointed Bishop of Tanjore, the Vatican allowed him to retain the title of Archbishop (Personal title). He was thus referred to as Archbishop Packiam Arokiasamy, Bishop of Tanjore. He retired 28 June 1997. He died in 2003.
