= Diocese of Ootacamund =

Roman Catholic diocese in Tamil Nadu, India

Coordinates: 11.4167°N 76.7086°E

Diocese of Ootacamund Dioecesis Ootacamundensis உதகமண்டலம் மறைமாவட்டம்
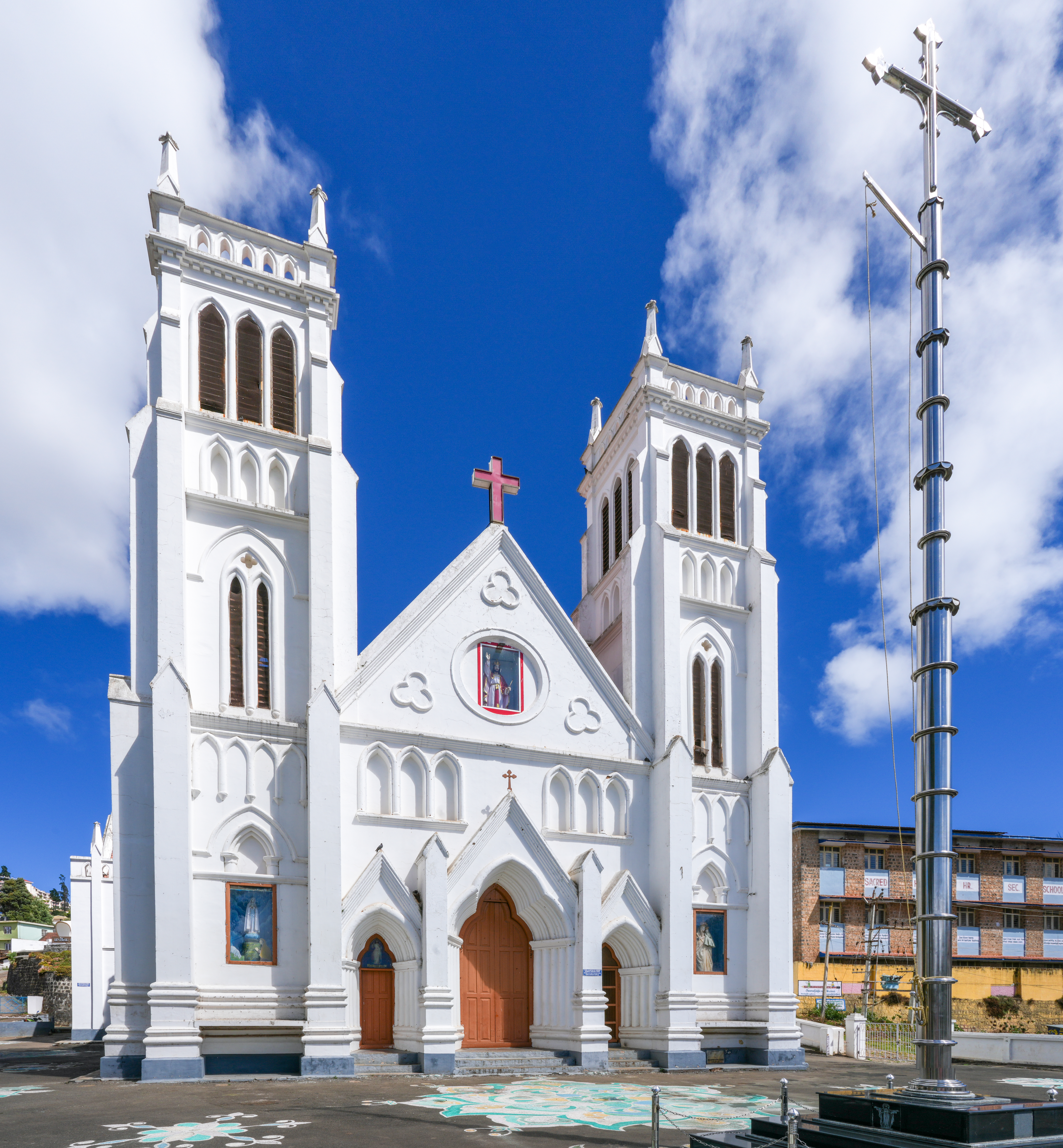
- Sacred Heart Cathedral, Ooty

Location
- Country: India
- Ecclesiastical province: Madras and Mylapore
- Metropolitan: Madras and Mylapore

Statistics
- Area: 7,312 km^{2} (2,823 sq mi)
- Population: Total; Catholics: (as of 2004); 1,461,000; 84,600 (5.8%)

Information
- Rite: Roman Rite
- Established: 3 July 1955
- Cathedral: Sacred Heart Cathedral in Ooty
- Patron saint: Sacred Heart of Jesus

Current leadership
- Pope: Leo XIV
- Bishop: Arulappan Amalraj
- Metropolitan Archbishop: George Antonysamy
- Vicar General: A. Anthony Swamy

Website
- http://www.ootacamunddiocese.org

The Roman Catholic Diocese of Ootacamund (Latin: Ootacamunden(sis)) is a diocese located in the city of Ootacamund (Ooty) in the ecclesiastical province of Madras and Mylapore in India.

== Bishops ==
- Bishops of Ootacamund Diocese (Latin Rite)
  - Bishop Mar Antony Padiyara (later Cardinal) (3 July 1955 – 14 June 1970)
  - Bishop Packiam Arokiaswamy (later Archbishop) (16 January 1971 – 6 December 1971)
  - Bishop James Masilamony Arul Das (later Archbishop) (21 December 1973 – 11 May 1994)
  - Bishop Antony Anandarayar (later Archbishop) (2 January 1997 – 10 June 2004)
  - Bishop Arulappan Amalraj (30 June 2006 – present)

== Saints and causes for canonisation ==
- Bl. Mary of the Passion established a convent and order in Ooty.
