= Sacred Heart Cathedral, Ooty =

Roman Catholic cathedral in Ooty, South India

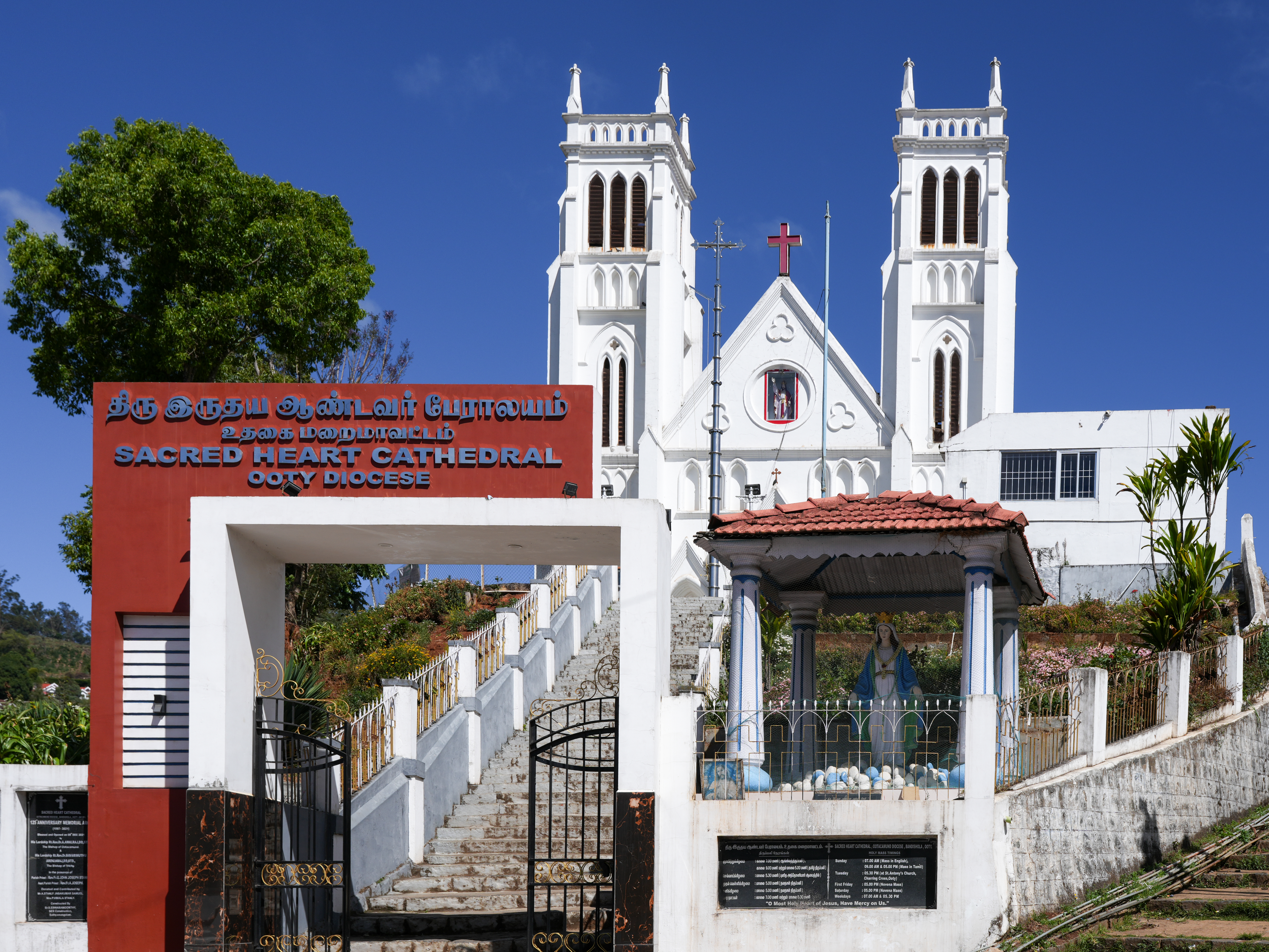
- Entrance to Sacred Heart Cathedral
- Sacred Heart Cathedral, Ooty
- 11°25′01″N 76°42′30″E
- Country: India
- Language(s): Tamil and English
- Denomination: Catholic Church
- Tradition: Latin Church
- Website: ootydiocese.org

History
- Former name: Church of the Sacred Heart
- Status: Cathedral on 3 July 1955
- Founded: 1897 (129 years ago)
- Consecrated: 28 February 1897

Architecture
- Functional status: Active

Administration
- Province: Madras and Mylapore
- Diocese: Ootacamund

Clergy
- Bishop: Rev. Dr. A. Amalraj

Sacred Heart Cathedral is a Roman Catholic church located near the Botanical Gardens in Ooty (Udhagamandalam) in the Nilgiris district, in Tamil Nadu in south India. Built in 1897, it is the second oldest Roman Catholic church in Ooty, the oldest being St. Mary's Church. It was designated a cathedral in 1955 when the Diocese of Ootacamund was created.

== History ==
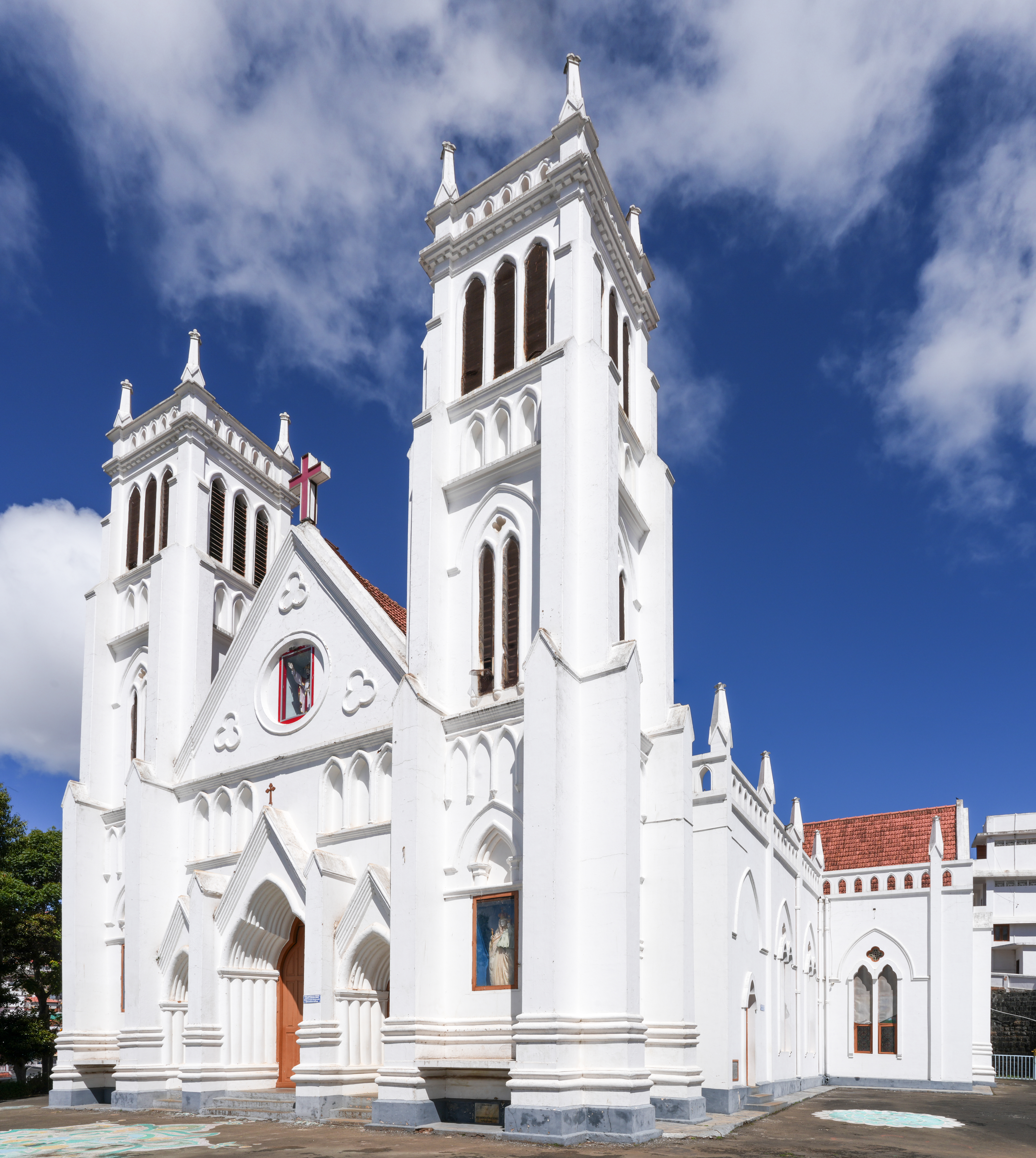
Front and east side

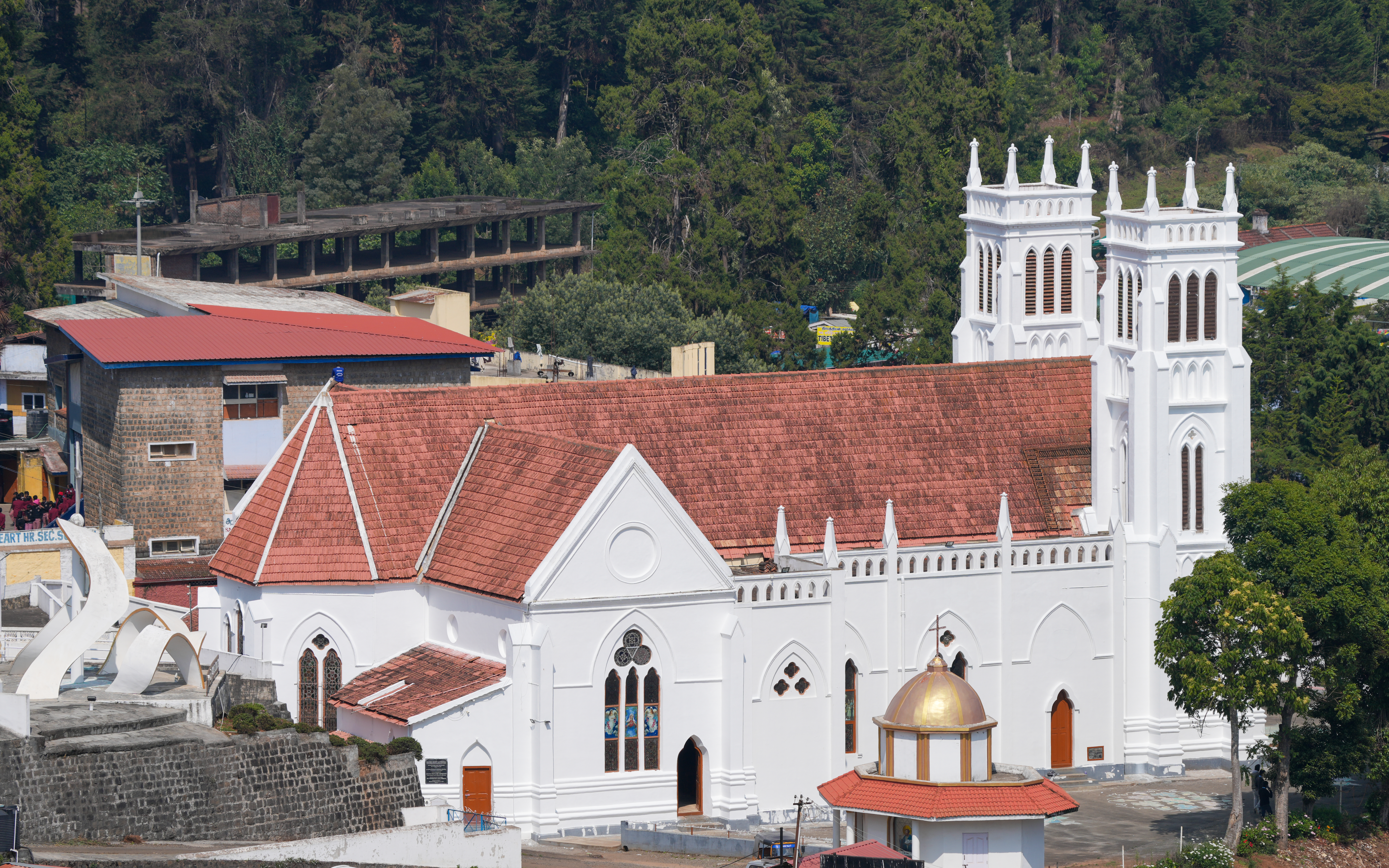
View from the west

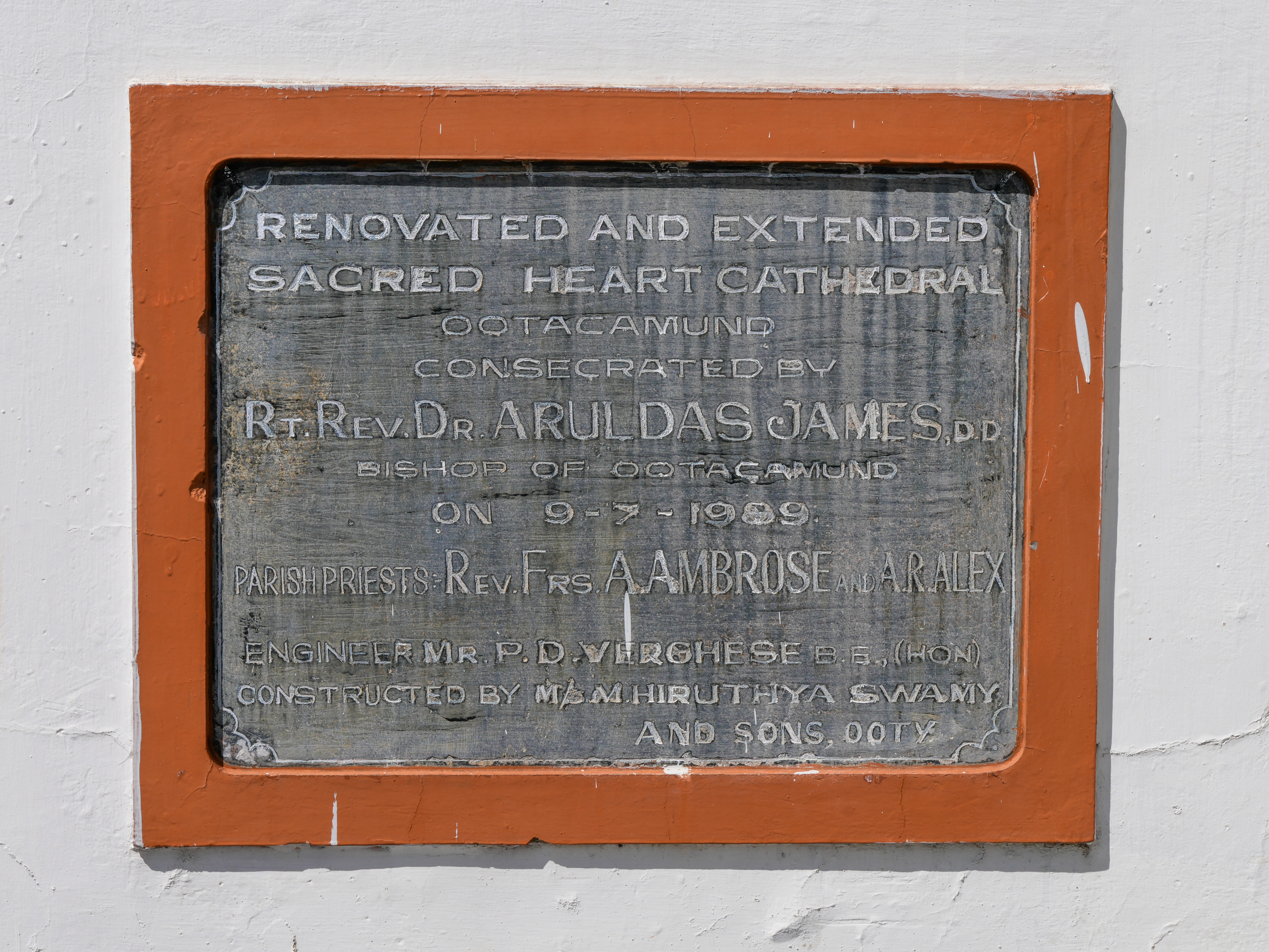
Consecration by Bishop of Ootacamund on 9 July 1989 after renovation in 1987

A visit by a Jesuit priest from Calicut in late 1602 or early 1603 was perhaps the earliest documented visit of Christians to the Nilgiri Mountains. The Jesuit Fr. Jacome Ferreiri, was sent to locate any Christians living in the Nilgiris. Although he did not find evidence of any, he spent a few days in the hills and later wrote a report on the manners and customs of the Todas and Badagas, the tribes that he visited. Two centuries later, Catholics among the Europeans who settled in Ooty in 1823 built a small chapel. Subsequently, the first church, St. Mary's Church was consecrated in 1870.

As the Catholic population continued to grow, land for a second church was purchased in 1895. The church was constructed by Fr. E. Foubert. It was consecrated as the Church of the Sacred Heart on 28 February 1897 by Monseigneur Bardon, Bishop of Coimbatore. The bell towers were built in 1918. They were named the "Towers of Victory" in commemoration of the end of the World War I.

On 3 July 1955, the church was designated as Sacred Heart Cathedral, the seat of the newly-formed Diocese of Ootacamund. The church was renovated and extended in 1987. In 2014, it was given a facelift for the diamond jubilee of the Diocese.

== Institutions ==
The church runs several institutions for the parishioners and others.

1. Sacred Heart Higher Secondary School, Bandishola
2. Sacred Heart Middle School, Bandishola
3. Neelavani Communication Centre, Charing Cross
4. Udhagamandalam Social Service Society, Charing Cross
5. Udhayam Youth Centre, Charing Cross

== See also ==
St. Mary's Church, Ooty
