= Gabriel Lawrence Sengol =

Indian bishop

Gabriel Lawrence Sengol (18 September 1928 – 29 January 2012) was the Catholic bishop of the Roman Catholic Diocese of Tiruchirapalli in India.

== Biography ==
Ordained in 1955, Sengol was named Bishop on 30 December 1990 and resigned in 1997. He died in 2012, aged 83.

Most Rev. Sengole Lawrence Gabriel was born on 18 September 1928 at Madhakottai, Thanjavur District, Tamil Nadu. He did his schooling in Thanjavur and Seminary formation at Poonamallee, Chennai. He was ordained priest on 27 April 1955.

During his pastoral ministry Fr. Gabriel served as Asst. Parish Priest at Pudukottai (1955) and at Vailankanni (1955–1964); as Parish Priest at Alangudu (1964) and at Karunganni (1964–1967); as Rector of the St. Mary's Minor Seminary, Thanjavur (1967–1982) and as Parish Priest at Vailankannni (1982–1990).

Fr. Gabriel contributed immensely to the phenomenal growth of the Shrine Basilica of Vailankanni both as Asst. Parish Priest and Parish Priest. He erected many buildings and bought a lot of land with the intention of developing Vailankanni just like Lourdes in France. In order to provide adequate safety to pilgrims, he reinforced the security personnel. It was at his time that, through the efforts of Bishop Sundaram and his own hard work, the Shrine of Our Lady of Health, Vailankanni was elevated to the status of Basilica by Pope John XXIII. He encouraged the pilgrimages from all corners of Tamil Nadu as well as from other parts of India.

In order to enhance the quality and extent of the accommodation of pilgrims, he undertook the construction of many houses/buildings/halls with other residential facilities, v.gr. a hospital for the sick pilgrims, a community hall and an open-air auditorium, various cottages and lodges. He also established a new colony known as Antoniarpuram, and provided several quarters for the benefit of the staff.

Fr. Gabriel persuaded several Religious Congregations to establish their houses at the Shrine. While the Sisters of Immaculate Heart of Mary and the Sisters of St. Louis Gonzaga are catering to the spiritual needs of the pilgrims, the Missionaries of Charity (MC) take care of the abandoned children and the handicapped. The blessing of the extremely sick with the Blessed Sacrament on every First Saturday as in Lourdes has been a great consolation to the many sick pilgrims that come to the Shrine. He introduced the adoration of the Blessed Sacrament on every First Saturday, and the exposition of the Holy Eucharist every day all through the year. Besides, he was much interested in promoting Marian devotion through literature.

In the educational field, he not only built a school for the local boys and girls at Vailankanni but even got it upgraded to the status of a Higher Secondary School. Moreover, he set up schools in many sub-stations of the Parish of Vailankanni and built/renovated some Chapels, particularly where the Christians were less in number.

Press apostolate has always been his favorite option. Besides authoring and editing some books, he did encourage people to write for journals. He always advocated the belief that Catholic books sustain a high culture and nurture piety. He also promoted reading habits and for this purpose he founded Oli Nilaya and a Library in Thanjavur.

For 13 years he was editor of Vailankanni Kuraloli (Tamil monthly of the Shrine Basilica of Vailankanni) and also headed Vedanayakar Ezhuthalar Kazhakam (Tamil Writers' Association). In fact, he initiated and encouraged the translation of the Papal Encyclicals.

He was National Secretary of the Pontifical Missionary Union for 15 years. In this capacity, he visited almost all the Dioceses of India from Kanyakumari to Kashmir. Wherever he went he spread the devotion to Our Lady of Health Vailankanni and introduced the English monthly 'Vailankanni Calling'. He strengthened the Legion of Mary not only in the Diocese of Thanjavur but also in the whole of Tamil Nadu. He served as the Inspector of schools of the Diocese of Thanjavur for three years and as the Regional Secretary of TNBC for the Catechism.

On 6 October 1990 Fr. Gabriel was appointed Bishop of Tiruchirapalli and was ordained Bishop on 30 December 1990.

Simplicity, humility and kindness were the hallmarks of his personality. During his episcopal ministry, he visited the villages and constructed Chapels in many of them. He established at least 10 new parishes. He spared no efforts to make his Diocese financially self-reliant. He had a great devotion to the Blessed Sacrament, which he promoted wherever he went among priests and people. During his pastoral visits to parishes he catechized the faithful to deepen the faith of his flock.

In order to make Jesus Christ more and more known and loved, he encouraged the people to read the Word of God daily and he even supplied the Bible free of cost to all parishes and sub-stations. Very loyal to the Magisterium of the Church, Bishop Gabriel devoted himself tirelessly to the ministry of evangelization, catechesis and charismatic renewal. As a matter of fact, he was deeply convinced about the evangelization done through Kalai Kaviri School of Fine Arts. He gave many talks in All India Radio and his clearly articulated sermons were much appreciated by the people.

Despite all his wonderful achievements and exemplary pastoral leadership, Bishop Gabriel also had his share of suffering and crosses. But in all the adversities that he faced in his Diocese, he always trusted in the Providence of God and maternal protection of Blessed Virgin Mary. On 14 October 1997, he resigned as Bishop of Tiruchirapalli after serving the Diocese for seven years.

Thereafter, he retired to Vettaikaraniruppu, a remote rural village where he could spend his time in prayer and evangelizing the poor people. He helped the local parish priest in spiritual activities and went about preaching the Word of God all over Tamil Nadu.

The funeral service of Bishop Sengole Lawrence Gabriel held on 30 January 2012, at the St. Mary's Cathedral, was largely attended by several Bishops, hundreds of priests, religious and lay faithful. The body was taken to his home Diocese of Thanjavur where it was buried as per his wish. May God of Mercies grant this zealous Pastor and faithful servant of the Church eternal bliss and heavenly reward!

You are kindly requested to offer one Holy Mass for the repose of the soul of Bishop Sengole Lawrence, late CBCI member.

Yours sincerely in Christ,

www.cbci.in/Circular.aspx/

Fr. Thomas d’Aquino Sequeira Deputy Secretary General, CBCI
