= St. Antony's Higher Secondary School (Thanjavur) =

Location
- Pookara Street, Mary's Corner; Thanjavur, Tamil Nadu, 613001; India

Information
- Type: Private/Government Aided
- Founded: 1885; 141 years ago
- School board: Higher Secondary School
- Headmaster: Fr. T. Xavier Raj
- Grades: 6-12
- Classes: 6th - 12th
- Language: Tamil, English
- Campus: Urban
- Campus size: Min 4000 students every year
- Website: stantonyshsstnj.com

St. Antony's Higher Secondary School is an educational institution dedicated to providing scholastic education for boys. It operates under the administration of the Roman Catholic Diocese of Thanjavur. The school comprises both a high school and a higher secondary school, offering instruction in both English and Tamil. The headmaster is appointed by the Diocese of Thanjavur, The current headmaster of this school is Fr. J. Antonysamy.

== Campus infrastructure ==
St. Antony's Higher Secondary School is located in Mary's Corner, behind the Sacred Heart Girl's Higher Secondary School. The campus comprises six buildings: Britto Building, Don Bosco Hall, Main Building, Office, Anbu Illam, and the Old Hostel Building. The facilities include a large football ground, two basketball courts, a volleyball court, and a Kho-Kho ground. Since its inception, the school has operated an eco-friendly Gobar gas plant. Additionally, the campus includes St. Antony's Church and a burial ground. The Annai Auditorium was constructed during 1995–96.

A former headmaster, Rev. Father S. Teresnathan Amalanather, later became the Bishop of Tuticorin.
