= Devadass Ambrose Mariadoss =

Indian Roman Catholic bishop (1947–2024)

Most Reverend Dr. Devadass Ambrose Mariadoss
- Bishop Emeritus of Thanjavur
- Province: Pondicherry and Cuddalore
- Diocese: Thanjavur
- Installed: 24 September 1997
- Term ended: 4 February 2023
- Predecessor: Packiam Arokiaswamy
- Successor: Sagayaraj Thamburaj

Orders
- Ordination: 5 August 1974 by Rajarethinam Arokiasamy Sundaram
- Consecration: 24 September 1997 by Duraisamy Simon Lourdusamy

Personal details
- Born: Devadass Ambrose; 6 October 1947 Ammapet, Tanjore, Madras Province, India
- Died: 26 May 2024 (aged 76) Thanjavur, Tamil Nadu, India
- Denomination: Catholic
- Residence: Bishop's House
- Parents: Mariadoss, Ranjitham
- Occupation: Bishop of Thanjavur
- Education: St. Paul's Seminary; St. Peter's Seminary; Pontifical Biblical Institute; Catholic University of Paris
- Motto: The Lord is My Shepherd

Devadass Ambrose Mariadoss (6 October 1947 – 26 May 2024) was an Indian Catholic bishop who served in the Roman Catholic Diocese of Thanjavur.

Mariadoss was born on 6 October 1947 to Mariadoss and Ranjitham, a Catholic family from Ammapet in Thanjavur District of Tamil Nadu state. After finishing his basic education at Appavu Thevar High School at Ukkadai, he joined St. Mary's Minor Seminary to become a diocesan priest when the diocese was in desperate need of native priests. He was then sent to Sri Pushpam College, Poondi, along with F. Antonysamy, the present bishop of Kumbakonam to do a pre-university course for his secular UG degree. After finishing his secular studies, he was sent to St. Paul's Seminary, Trichy for his priestly formation and for his philosophical (B.ph) and theological studies (B.Th.). Eventually, he was ordained a priest on 5 August 1974 by Bishop Arokiasamy Sundaram, the first Bishop of Thanjavur. Mariadoss died on 26 May 2024, at the age of 76.

== Priesthood ==
After his ordination, he was appointed as an assistant parish priest of Nagapattinam. After spending 5 years at Nagapattinam, in 1979, he was sent to join the staff at St. Peter's Pontifical Seminary, Bangalore. Thus he became a professor in Sacred Scripture at St. Peter's Pontifical Institute. After a short period of probation, he was sent to Rome for his higher studies from 1980 to 1984, from where he received his licentiate in sacred scripture (LSS) from the Biblical Institute, Rome, run by the Jesuits. Then he came back to the seminary and taught sacred scripture for the seminarians. Again, from 1991 to 1994, he went to Paris, France, for his doctoral studies in the Catholic University, Paris (STD); he graduated "Summa Cum Laude". He had also received earlier a diploma in Biblical studies at the Hebrew University, Jerusalem.

While he was in St. Peter's Seminary, he had also rendered his service by being 'Registrar' of the Institute and then he was nominated as the bishop of Thanjavur on 28 June 1997 while he was still a Vice-Rector of St. Peter's Seminary.

== Bishop of Thanjavur ==
On 24 September 1997, Devadass Ambrose was solemnly consecrated as the third Bishop of Thanjavur by Simon Cardinal Lourdusamy along with the co-consecrators, Archbishop Michael Augustine, the Archbishop of Pondicherry-Cuddalore and Packiam Arokiaswamy, the outgoing bishop of Thanjavur. After tireless service of 25 long years as Bishop of Thanjavur, at the completion of 75 years of his age, his resignation was accepted by the Holy See on 4 February 2023.

== Education ==
In 1997 Devadass Ambrose began to push for the creation of new schools and colleges, which would give quality education to poor children in an affordable fees structure. A first institution for girls, named "Our Lady of Good Health School of Nursing", was opened in 2005 at Thanjavur, followed soon by a second one for boys and girls. Now there are at least five higher education institutions with various disciplines. The collected fee is used for the maintenance of the institutions and their infrastructure; deserving students also receive scholarships for their studies.

The central government has made NEET (National Eligibility cum Entrance Test) compulsory for all the students who aspire to study MBBS. The syllabus for the NEET is taken from CBSE. Unfortunately the diocese does not have a single CBSE school and hence to start with, the Bishop wanted to establish one such school in Thanjavur at Bishop Sundaram Campus. There are two blocks, one for Primary and the other for the Secondary. The Primary Block is dedicated to Packiam Arokiasamy, the Second Bishop of Thanjavur and the Secondary Block is dedicated to Rev. R. A. Sundaram, the first bishop of Thanjavur. Affordable fee structure, Quality of Education and the Proximity have attracted the students and the parents and in the first year itself (2019–2020) the strength of the newly established CBSE school is 1097.

=== Institutions of education ===
- Our Lady of Good Health School of Nursing
- Our Lady of Good Health College of Nursing
- St. John de Britto College of Education (BEd and MEd)
- St. John de Britto Teachers Training Institute (D. T. Ed)
- Annai Vailankanni Arts & Science College
- Bishop Devadass Ambrose Vidyalaya

Catholic Church titles
| Preceded by Packiam Arokiaswamy | Bishop of Thanjavur; 1997–2023 | Succeeded by Vacant |
