= St. Mary's Cathedral, Tiruchirappalli =

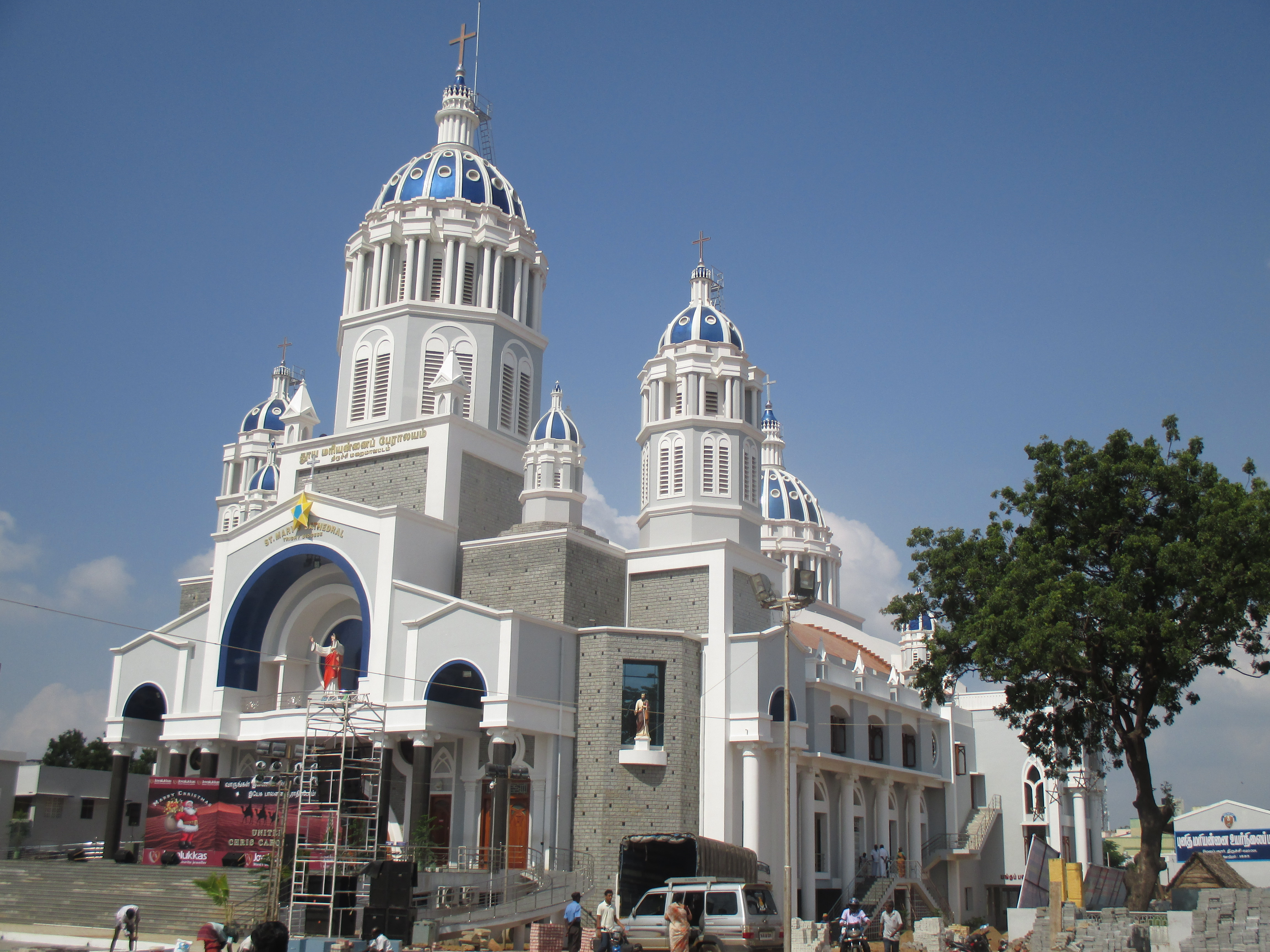
- St. Mary's Cathedral, Tiruchirapalli

- St. Mary's Cathedral, Tiruchirapalli in Tamil Nadu
- 10.805372°N 78.691547°E
- Location: Convent Road, Melapudur, Tiruchirapalli, Tamil Nadu
- Country: India
- Denomination: Roman Catholic

History
- Founded: 1839
- Dedication: St. Mary
- Dedicated: 1841

Architecture
- Functional status: functioning
- Style: Gothic and Romanesque

Administration
- Archdiocese: Roman Catholic Diocese of Tiruchirapalli

St. Mary's Cathedral, Tiruchirappalli is a Roman Catholic church situated in Tiruchirappalli district of Tamil Nadu state in the peninsular India. This cathedral is dedicated to St. Mary who is also called as 'Mother of Good Health' here. This church was started building in the year 1839 and completed and dedicated in the year 1841. This cathedral lies at the heart of the city of Tiruchirapalli. The church is constructed in a combination of Gothic and Romanesque styles. This cathedral is the episcopal seat of the Diocese of Tiruchirapalli.

== Location ==
St. Mary's Cathedral is located with the geographic coordinates of (10.805372°N 78.691547°E) at an altitude of about 99.51 metres (326.5 ft) above the mean sea level, in Tiruchirappalli.

St. Mary's Cathedral, Tiruchirappalli (Tamil Nadu)
