= Rajarethinam Arokiasamy Sundaram =

Indian Catholic Clergyman

Bishop Rajarethinam Arokiasamy Sundaram
- Bishop Emeritus of Tanjore
- See: Tanjore
- Appointed: 4 February 1953
- Installed: 19 March 1953
- Term ended: 12 September 1986
- Successor: Packiam Arokiaswamy

Orders
- Ordination: 24 February 1941
- Consecration: 19 March 1953 by Louis Mathias

Personal details
- Born: Rajarethinam Arokiasamy Sundaram; 10 June 1905 Megathur
- Died: 28 August 1998 (aged 93)
- Denomination: Catholic

Ordination history of Rajarethinam Arokiasamy Sundaram
History
Episcopal consecration
- Principal consecrator: Louis Mathias
- Co-consecrators: Thomas Pothacamury (Pothakamuri) James Mendonça
Episcopal succession
Bishops consecrated by Rajarethinam Arokiasamy Sundaram as principal consecrator
- Abraham Aruliah Somavarapa: 1977

Rajarethinam Arokiasamy Sundaram (RA Sundaram) (10 June 1905 – 28 August 1998) was an Indian Catholic clergyman who served as Bishop of Thanjavur (then known as Tanjore) from 4 February 1953 to 12 September 1986.

== Early life ==
Born on 10.06.1905 as the first son of Rajarathinam and Lourdu Mary in a devout family of Valampuri, Thanjavur, Arokia Samy Sundaram had his school education at Thanjavur and Palayamkot Sundaram finished his school education in Thanjavur and Palayamkottai. He joined St. Joseph's College, Thiruchirapalli for higher studies. Sundaram wanted to join the seminary but had to give up his plan. As a compromise, he decided to work for a few years and then join the seminary. Accordingly, he taught English at the St. Xavier's, Palayamkottai for a short period and got an offer to work as a professor of physics at St. Joseph's College, Darjeeling. After three years, Sundaram joined the minor seminary at Santhome. He joined the Urban College in Rome to enable his ordination in six years. He was an outstanding seminarian there too. He was a member of the literary association there, editing and publishing newsletters and compering programmes in the Radio Vatican. Sundaram was ordained as priest on 24.02.1941 by Cardinal Fumasoni Pionti, thus fulfilling his dream. Fr. Sundaram celebrated his first mass in the St. Paul's Cathedral, and the second one at the Cemetery grotto of St. Peter's Basilica in Rome.

== As Headmaster ==
After a short stint as assistant Parish Priest at Vallam near Thanjavur, Fr. Sundaram was appointed Headmaster of Santhome High School, Mylapore. His efforts made the school a top ranking one in the city, within a short period. At the request of the Government, Fr. Sundaram held this position even after his transfer from the school, taking over as Director of Catholic Seva Sangh and Director of Catechism of Mylapore diocese.

== Bishop of Thanjavur ==
The Diocese of Thanjavur was created on 22 November 1952 and Fr. Sundaram assumed charge on 25.03.1953 as First Bishop of Thanjavur.

Our Lady of Health Hospital

Our Lady of Health Hospital was the outcome of the ardent desire of Fr. Sundaram to render medical help to the sick and the needy people of Thanjavur. Because of Fr. Sundaram's efforts, on 4 April 1961 the hospital was opened by Mrs. Lourdammal Simon Minister of Local administrative of Tamil Nadu with 16 beds and 3 sisters. Currently this hospital has 200 beds in this half of beds free of cost. This hospital has multiple wards like Medical Ward, Surgical Ward, Maternity Ward, Pediatric Ward, Gynecology Ward, Ophthalmology Ward, Operation Theater, Casualty and Emergency unit and Out Patient department. He formed two social service societies at Thanjavur and Pudukkottai that helped uplift the status of the poor. Some of their schemes had been unique and innovative and one among them was providing lands to the landless. Soon, there was a phenomenal increase in the number of educational, religious and social welfare institutions. Even today, the diocese of Thanjavur has the highest number of boarding homes for students in India. Bishop Sundaram utilised the contributions received at the Shrine of Velankanni for the welfare of the pilgrims. Bishop Sundaram had called on all the Popes of his time, and participated in the Second Vatican Council held in 1962. He toured many countries.

His relationship with political leaders and heads of Governments and officials was always cordial. When the cemetery of Mayuram Vedanayagam Pillai was renovated and blessed, and the statue of this first novelist in Tamil was unveiled, Thavathiru Kundrakudi Adigalar, and Arulthiru Adheenam of Dharmapuram Math were the chief guests. Bishop Sundaram had visited the Dharumapuram Math also, at the invitation of the Adheenam. When once E. V. R. Periyar, the father of the Dravidian movement had been admitted in the local Medical College Hospital, Bishop Sundaram called on him and assured him of prayers for his speedy recovery.

== Later years and Death ==
After his eventful term of 33 years, the bishop retired on 26.111986. A biography was released on that occasion. The bishop died on 28.08.1998 and his body was interred in the Sacred Heart Cathedral. It is therefore apt to say that Bishop Sundaram's name is synonymous with the annals of the diocese of Thanjavur.

Bishop Sundaram was its first bishop and continued his service for 33 years since his consecration. Besides his pastoral works, the visionary bishop's multidimensional approach on the promotion of education and socio-cultural economic measures benefited different sections of the society and endeared him to all.
