= Antony Devotta =

Roman Catholic bishop (1943–2019)

Antony Devotta was the ninth bishop of the Roman Catholic Diocese of Tiruchirappalli of the Ecclesiastical Province of Madurai, Tamil Nadu, India.

== Early life and education ==
He was born on 30 June 1943 in Santhome, Chennai. His family had moved from Our Lady of Snow's Basilica, Tuticorin and owned popular Ceylon Bakery in Chennai. After his initiation in St Thomas Minor Seminary, Chennai, he pursued his philosophical and theological formation in Sacred Heard Seminary in Poonamalee, Chennai. He was ordained a priest on 27 August 1971 for the Archdiocese of Chennai-Mylapore.

== Sacerdotal ministry ==
After his priestly ordination, he was appointed assistant parish priest of Santhome Cathedral, Chennai and assistant editor of a Catholic magazine ‘New Leader’ (1971–1978). He was sent for higher studies in Rome. He obtained a licentiate in Pastoral Theology in Pontifical Lateran University, Rome (1978–1981). He served as the professor of systematic theology in Sacred Heart Seminary (1981–1984). He further continued his doctoral studies in Rome (1984–1987). After his doctoral studies, he served as the parish priest of Chingleput and Tambaram (1987–1993). He again continued his teaching ministry and served as the Dean of Studies in the same seminary (1993–1995). He was appointed the vicar general and the rector of the National Shrine Basilica of St Thomas, Chennai in 1995. After 30 years of priestly ministry, he was appointed the bishop of Diocese of Tiruchirapalli on 12 December 2000 by Pope John Paul II and was consecrated on 28 January 2001 by Duraisamy Simon Cardinal Lourdusamy.

== Episcopal ministry ==
He served as the chairman of the Commission for Social Communication of the Tamil Nadu Bishops' Council and as the president of the Commission for Catechetics of CCBI. In his tenure as president, the First Catechetical Directory of India was published in 2015. He participated in the XII Ordinary General Assembly of the Synod of Bishops of Rome in 2008, representing the Indian bishops. Pope Francis accepted the resignation of Devotta on 14 July 2018 at his retirement age of 75.

== Death and last will ==
After his retirement, he was residing in St Augustine Minor Seminary, Trichy.Devotta died 15 October 2019 due to a severe cardiac arrest. In his will, he had expressed his desire to donate his eyes and body. His eyes were donated to St Joseph's Eye Hospital, Tiruchirappalli. After a funeral mass in St Mary's Cathedral, Trichy, his body was handed over to St John's National Academy of Health Sciences, Bangalore. He is the first Indian bishop to donate his body in the history of Catholic Church of India and the second bishop in the Univarsal Catholic Church, first being the bishop emeritus of Girona, Bishop Camprodon i Rovira who donated his body to Barcelona's Faculty of Medicine in 2016.
