= Pierre Brigot =

French missionary (1713–1791)

Bishop Pierre Brigot M.E.P.
- Superior of Karnatic Mission (Pondicherry); Titular Bishop of Thabraca
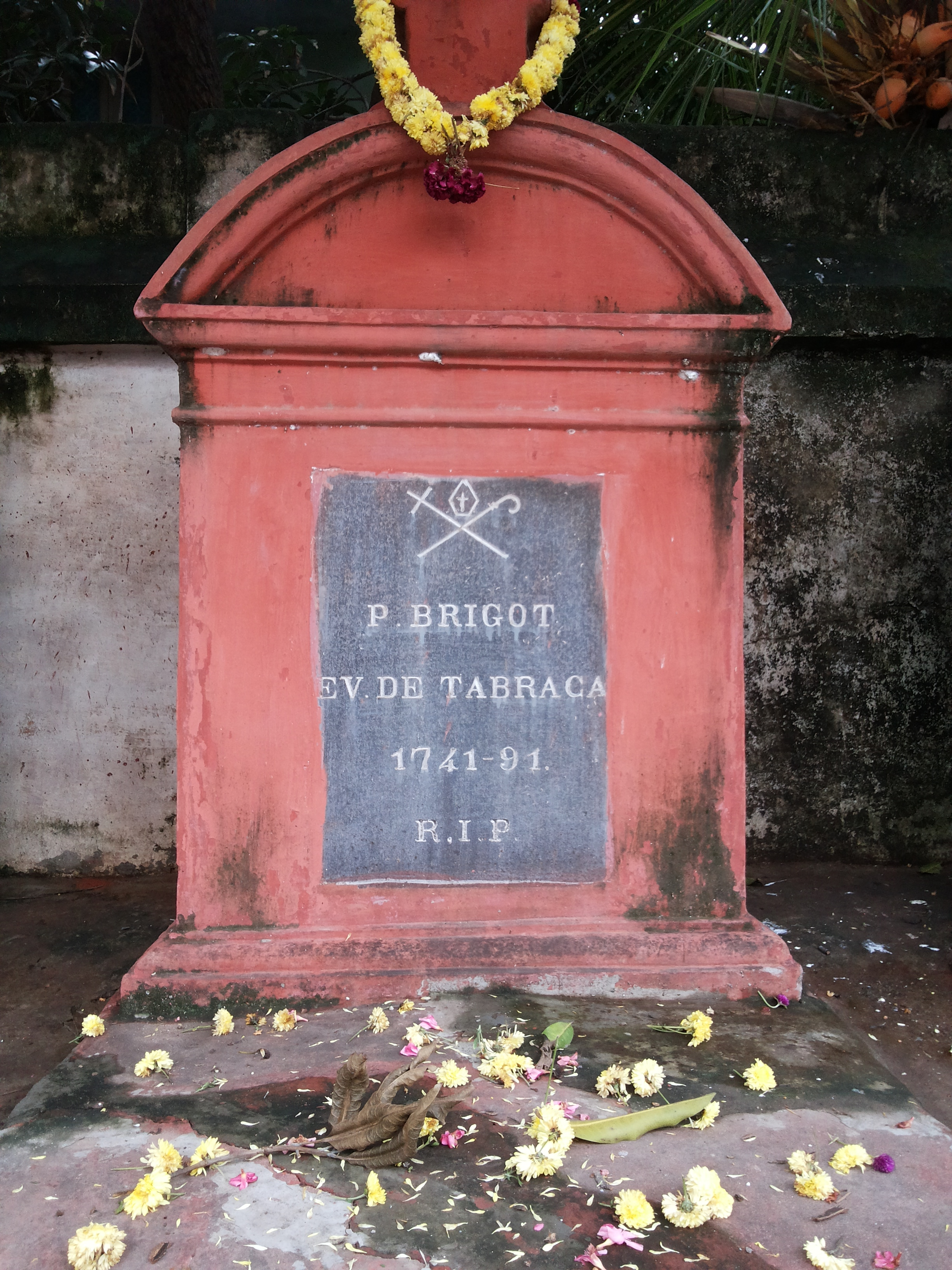
- Tomb of Pierre Brigot
- See: Karnatic Mission
- Appointed: 30 September 1776
- Term ended: 8 November 1791
- Successor: Nicolas Champenois

Orders
- Consecration: 24 August 1757 by Juan de La Fuente Yepes

Personal details
- Born: Pierre Brigot; 1 September 1713 Sully-sur-Loire, France
- Died: 8 November 1791 (aged 78) Pondicherry, India
- Buried: Cathedral Cemetery, Pondicherry
- Denomination: Catholic

Pierre Brigot (1 September 1713 – 8 November 1791) was a missionary of the Paris Foreign Missions Society and was the first Superior of Karnatic Mission headquartered at Pondicherry which later became the Archdiocese of Pondicherry and Cuddalore. He was the Superior from 30 September 1776 until his death.

He was formerly the Vicar Apostolic of Siam in Thailand from 8 December 1755. After his death the Karnatic Mission was headed by Bishop Nicolas Champenois.

== Early life ==
He was born at Sully-sur-Loire in the Diocese of Orléans, France on 1 September 1713. He joined the Paris Foreign Missions Society and was sent to Siam (Thailand) in 1741.

== Siam Mission ==
He worked first in a place called Mergui. In 1749 he apposed the erection of a stone in front of his Church. The stone is claimed to have contained abusive language towards Catholicism and for that reason it was called scandal stone. After two months of fighting, the Governor relented. From 1742 to 1750, he worked as the provicar of the Tenasserim.

He came back to Bangkok on 22 January 1755 and was appointed titula bishop of Thabraca and Coadjutor of Siam. Since his predecessor Jean de Lolière-Puycontat died before consecrating him, Brigot went to Manila to receive his episcopal consecration on 24 August 1757 from Bishop Juan de La Fuente Yepes.

Dunring the Burmese–Siamese War of 1767 Bishop Brigot, his missionaries together with their Christians and seminarians, a Jesuit, Dominicans, another Portuguese priest, and their Christians were taken prisoners. Seeing fellow Christians in misery, he gave them everything he had, he even sold his episcopal ring. During the month of May they were taken to Tavoy and then in November to Rangoon. The Franciscans and Barnabites missionaries in this city, chose him as arbitrator on an issue that divided them, and accepted his decision.

On 31 January 1768, he consecrated Giovanni Maria Percoto as the Titular Bishop of Maxula Prates and the Vicar Apostolic of Ava e Pegù. He left in March of that year to Pondicherry.

== Karnatic Mission ==
After the Suppression of the Society of Jesus, the Karnatic Mission was given to the Paris Foreign Missions Society. He was appointed as its Superior by Pope Pius VI on 30 September 1776. He devoted himself to the reunion of the Jesuits and MEP missionaries and encouraged them to work together.

By a decree issued on 7 September 1778, he gained 13 jurisdictions, which gave him authority over all Christians in the territory of the French colony excluding Europeans and Creoles who remained subject to the Capuchins. Later his jurisdiction was extended over the Madurai and the Mysore. He consulted with Rome on some Indian customs and caste, and wisely applied the guidelines he received.

== Death ==
In 1785, he chose Nicolas Champenois as coadjutor and consecrated him as the Titular Bishop of Doliche on 5 November 1786. Because of old age and sickness, he entrusted the administration to his coadjutor. He died in Pondicherry on 8 November 1791.

Ordination history of Pierre Brigot
History
Episcopal consecration
- Consecrated by: Juan de La Fuente Yepes
Episcopal succession
Bishops consecrated by Pierre Brigot as principal consecrator
- Guillaume Piguel: 1764
- Giovanni Maria Percoto: 1768
- Luigi Pianazzi: 1785
- Nicolas Champenois: 1786

Catholic Church titles
New creation	— TITULAR — Bishop of Thabraca; 22 January 1755 – 8 November 1791	Succeeded by Saint Gabriel-Taurin Dufresse, M.E.P.
Preceded by Jean de Lolière-Puycontat, M.E.P	Vicar Apostolic of Siam; 8 December 1755 – 30 September 1776	Succeeded by Olivier-Simon Le Bon, M.E.P
New creation	Superior of Karnatic Mission / Pondicherry; 30 September 1776 – 8 November 1791	Succeeded by Nicolas Champenois, M.E.P
