= Louis-Charles-Auguste Hébert =

French missionary (1763-1836)

Bishop Louis-Charles-Auguste Hébert M.E.P.
- Vicar Apostolic of Madurai and Coromandel Coast
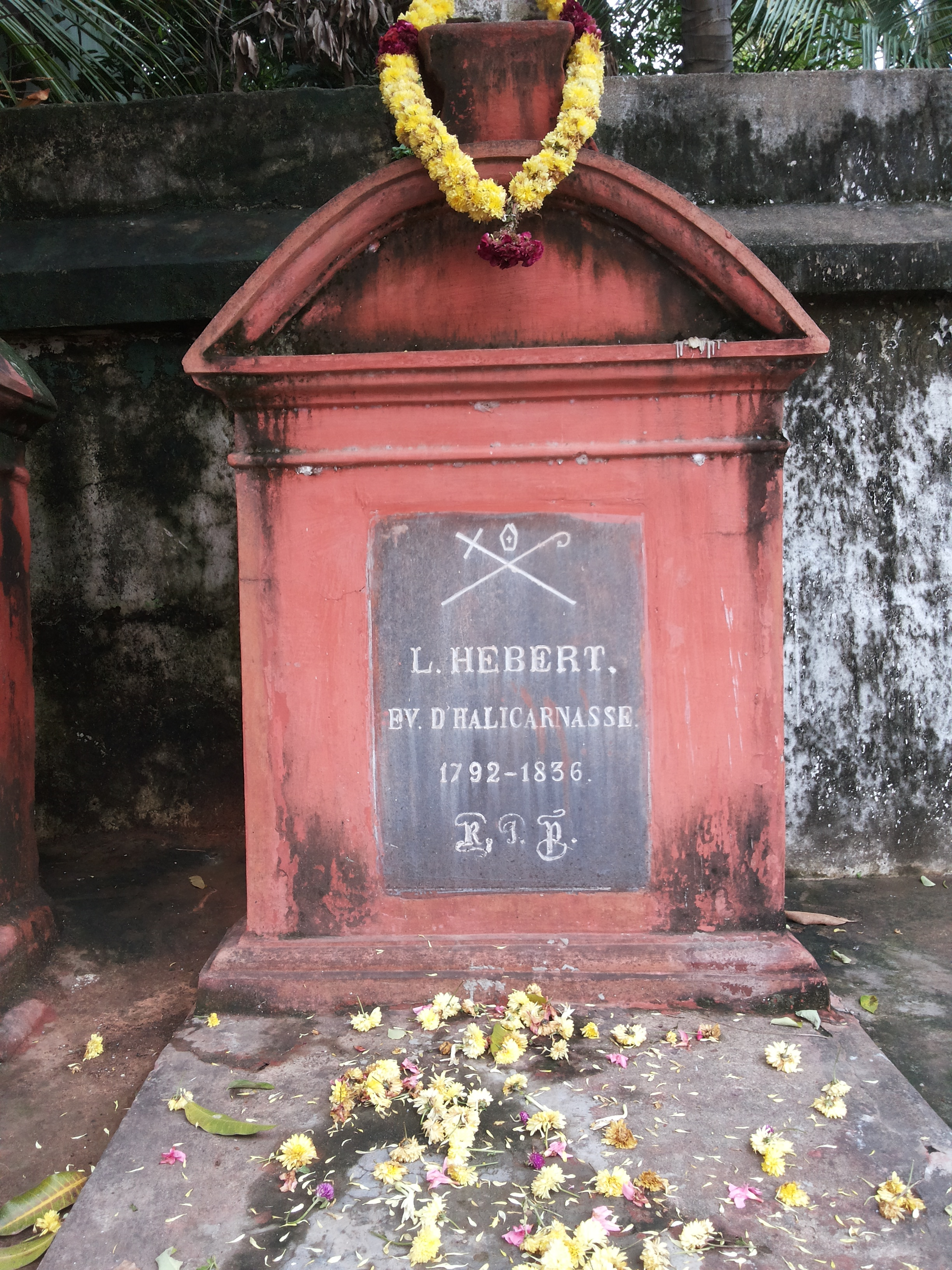
- Tomb of Mgr. Louis-Charles-Auguste Hébert
- See: Madurai and Coromandel Coast
- Appointed: 8 July 1836
- Installed: 3 March 1811
- Term ended: 3 October 1836
- Predecessor: Nicolas Champenois
- Successor: Clément Bonnand (as Vicar Apostolic of Pondicherry); Alexis Canoz, S.J.(as Vicar Apostolic of Madurai and Coromandel Coast)

Orders
- Consecration: 3 March 1811 by Paolo Antonio Roviglia

Personal details
- Born: Louis-Charles-Auguste Hébert; 31 December 1763 Villedieu-les-Bailleuls, France
- Died: 3 October 1836 (aged 72) Pondicherry
- Buried: Cathedral Cemetery, Pondicherry
- Denomination: Catholic
- Motto: Euntes Prædicate (Go Preach - Mark 16:15)
- Coat of arms: Louis-Charles-Auguste Hébert's coat of arms

Styles of Louis-Charles-Auguste Hébert
- Reference style: His Excellency
- Spoken style: Your Excellency
- Religious style: The Most Reverend

Ordination history of Louis-Charles-Auguste Hébert
History
Episcopal consecration
- Consecrated by: Paolo Antonio Roviglia
Episcopal succession
Bishops consecrated by Louis-Charles-Auguste Hébert as principal consecrator
- Clément Bonnand: 1833

Louis-Charles-Auguste Hébert (French pronunciation: [lwi ʃaʁl oɡyst ebɛʁ]; 31 December 1763 – 3 October 1836) was a missionary of Paris Foreign Missions Society and was the Vicar Apostolic of Madurai and Coromandel Coast from 8 July 1836 until his death on 3 October 1836.

== Biography ==
He was born in Villedieu-lès-Bailleul, France on 31 December 1763. He left for the Malabar Mission on 29 January 1792 and arrived in Pondicherry the same year. He was given charge of the newly constituted College (seminary). At the same time he was asked to be in charge of the parishes of Oulgaret and Nellitope in Pondicherry.

In 1806 he was nominated Bishop of Halicarnasse (titular see) and coadjutor to Mgr. Champenois who, because of Hébert's poor health, refused to ordained him bishop. When after 5 years he consented to do so, it was Fr. Hébert who refused to be consecrated that nobody was available to replace him in his parishes as well as procurator of the mission.

After the death of Mgr. Champenois and Fr. Hebert had to go to Verapoly in a bullock-cart to be consecrated as bishop by carmelite Paolo Antonio Roviglia, titular bishop of Sura and Apostolic Vicar of Malabar, on 2 March 1811. Having left Pondicherry on 5 February on his bullock-cart, he was back on 4 April, covering almost 1000 km for his consecration. His episcopal motto was Euntes Prædicate, which means Go Preach, taken from Mark 16:15.

Because of the French Revolution and subsequently the Napoleonic Wars, the Malabar mission was in a very critical situation. Priests and financial resources were scarce. Only after 1819 was it possible to send young missionaries and only 6 local priests were ordained between 1814 and 1823.

During the epidemic of cholera in 1829, the Bishop distributed as much help as he was able to. He even has to melt the sacred vessels and sell them to make some money to help the victims of the famine. Mgr. Hebert obtained from Rome the title of Vicar Apostolic but died on 3 October 1836 before the Brief reached him.

Under his administration, the Sisters of St. Joseph of Cluny came to Pondicherry to open an orphanage for girls. In 1828, he chose Father Clément Bonnand as his coadjutor and consecrated him on 1833.

Catholic Church titles
Preceded by Elzear des Achards de La Baume	— TITULAR — Bishop of Halicarnassus; 8 July 1806 – 3 October 1836	Succeeded by Jan Dekert
Preceded by Nicolas Champenois	Superior of Karnatic Mission / Pondicherry; 30 October 1811 – 8 July 1836	Succeeded by Clément Bonnand, M.E.P as Vicar Apostolic of Pondicherry
New title	Vicar Apostolic of Madurai and Coromandel Coast, India; 8 July 1836 – 3 October 1836	Succeeded by Alexis Canoz, S.J.
