= Nicolas Champenois =

French bishop (1734–1811)

Bishop Nicolas Champenois M.E.P.
- Superior of Karnatic Mission / Pondicherry; Titular Bishop of Doliche
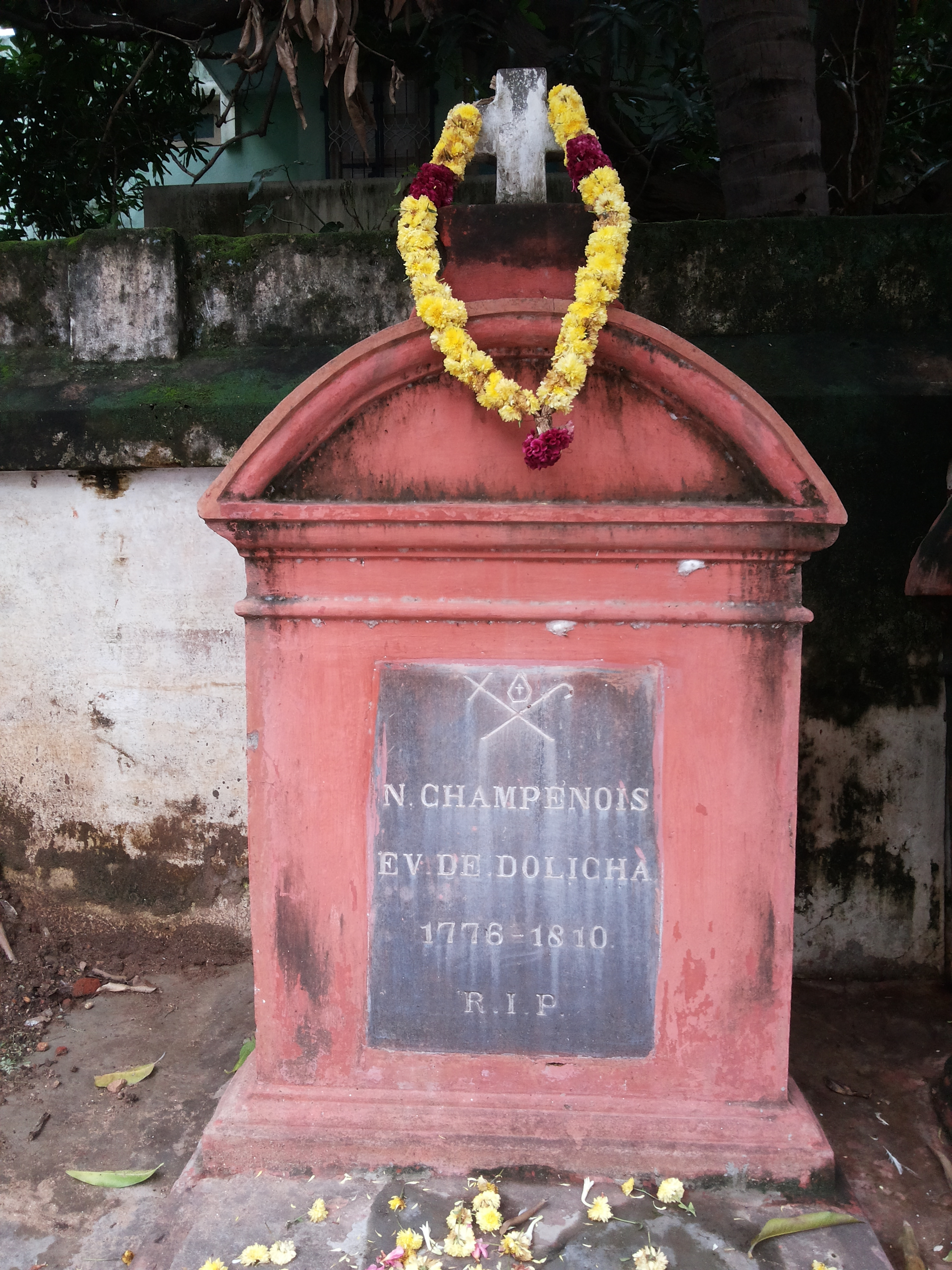
- See: Karnatic Mission / Pondicherry
- Appointed: 14 June 1785 (As Coadjutor)
- Installed: 5 November 1786 (Succeeded)
- Term ended: 30 October 1811
- Predecessor: Pierre Brigot
- Successor: Louis-Charles-Auguste Hébert

Orders
- Consecration: 5 November 1786 by Pierre Brigot

Personal details
- Born: Nicolas Champenois; April 1734 Reims, France
- Died: 30 October 1811 (aged 77) Pondicheryy
- Buried: Cathedral Cemetery, Pondicherry
- Denomination: Catholic

Nicolas Champenois (April 1734 – 30 October 1811) was a missionary of the Paris Foreign Missions Society and was the Superior of Karnatic Mission after Pierre Brigot from 8 November 1791 until his death. He was succeeded by Louis-Charles-Auguste Hébert.

== Early life ==
Nicolas Champenois was born in the month of April 1734. He belonged to the diocese of Reims where he served the ministry, especially Chaourse parish. He was probably priest even before he entered the Paris Foreign Missions Society Seminary on 13 July 1776.

He was sent to the Malabar Mission (Pondicherry) and reached there on 13 January 1777. He had been first in-charge of an inland mission. Towards the end of the same year, became procurator of the Mission. Later he became the Superior of the Major Seminary. Papal brief dated 14 June 1785 made him the Coadjutor Superior of Karnatic Mission with Doliche as his titular see. He was consecrated by Pierre Brigot on 5 November 1786 in Pondicherry. Because of the ill health of his predecessor, he was in charge of the diocese immediately.

== As a Bishop ==
One of his first acts was to prevent Karaikal in Malabar mission to be entrusted to the Apostolic Prefecture run by the Capuchins.

He obtained from Rome by decree of 19 July 1788, the power over all the Catholics of the diocese of Mylapore inhabiting the lands where the bishop of Mylapore could not carry out his jurisdiction. He also received greater powers than before regarding marriage dispensations, various indulgences and permission to recite some offices. An agreement signed on 17 September 1793, the Capuchins Apostolic Prefect, Fr. Benjamin and Bishop Champagne agreed to iron out the then existing jurisdictional difficulties by mutually transmitting their powers.

Customs of India sometimes raising doubts that left no worry of some missionaries, the bishop gave them advice marked mindedness and based on experience.

He built in Pondicherry, close to the cathedral, a new seminar and a small college. This later became the Petit Seminaire Higher Secondary School. He also completed the construction work of the Cathedral which was begun by the Jesuits in 1770 on the same place in which it was destroyed in 1736. He consecrated it on 20 June 1791.

In 1792 Mgr.Champenois was forced by the British soldiers to sing Te Deum in the Place d'Armes, where they had to plant a tree of liberty, but he refused. The soldiers threatened him, but he replied: "My body is in your hands, my heart is in God's". He was forced to leave French territory and retire to San Thome. He returned to Pondicherry few months later, when the English had taken this city.

In September 1794 he went to visit places of his mission. He stopped at length at Trichinopoly and in Madurai. The Goans accused him and caused him many trouble; eventually he was forced to leave the place. The English Government, at their request, said not to recognize other jurisdiction in the country, than that of the Bishop of Mylapour. In order to end this situation, he tried unsuccessfully to get the title of Vicar Apostolic: the Holy See maintained the status quo. At that time, the English had such distrust of the French priests, whom they refused Mgr. Champenois necessary passport to visit the two missions that Rome entrusted to him by the brief of 23 August 1796: one with the Capuchins of Patna, the other among the missionaries of Madras in order to bring harmony among these apostolic workers, and to put an end to the administrative difficulties.

Even while governing the mission, he administered a few parishes in Pondicherry, especially Ariancoupam where we can frequently find his name on the parish registers from 23 December 1798 to the year 1809.

== Death ==
Around 1805, his health began to deteriorate. He asked for a coadjutor. Mgr. Hébert was named as his coadjutor. Because of a fall on 27 April 1810 his health became even worse. He died in Pondicherry on 30 October 1811.

It was worn out with mortification and was exhausted. He insisted on continuing his austerities; He continued to fast even when the Roman Pontiff granted him special dispensation. His official biography at MEP archives end as follows: "His administration was wise, prudent, and with very limited resources, he managed to deal with the most pressing needs".

Ordination history of Nicolas Champenois
History
Episcopal consecration
- Consecrated by: Pierre Brigot
Episcopal succession
Bishops consecrated by Nicolas Champenois as principal consecrator
- Arnaud-Antoine Garnault: 1787

== See also ==
- Catholic Church in India

Catholic Church titles
Preceded by John Stafford	— TITULAR — Bishop of Doliche; 4 June 1785 – 30 October 1811	Succeeded by Abraham Candil
Preceded by Pierre Brigot, M.E.P	Superior of Karnatic Mission / Pondicherry; 8 November 1791 – 30 October 1811	Succeeded by Louis-Charles-Auguste Hébert, M.E.P
