= Arnaud-François Lefèbvre =

Most Reverend Arnaud-François Lefèbvre
- Apostolic Vicar of Cochin
- Church: Catholic Church
- Diocese: Apostolic Vicararite of Cochin
- Predecessor: Alexandre de Alexandris
- Successor: Guillaume Piguel

Orders
- Consecration: 6 January 1743 by Jean de Lolière-Puycontat

Personal details
- Born: 21 December 1709 Calais, France
- Died: 27 March 1760 (aged 50)

Arnaud-François Lefèbvre (21 December 1709 – 27 March 1760) served as the Apostolic Vicar of Cochin (1741–1760).

== Biography ==
Arnaud-François Lefèbvre was born in Calais, France and was an ordained priest of the Société des Missions étrangères de Paris. On 6 October 1741, Pope Benedict XIV appointed him Apostolic Vicar of Cochin and Titular Bishop of Nea Aule. On 6 January 1743 he was consecrated bishop by Jean de Lolière-Puycontat, Apostolic Vicar of Siam. He served as Apostolic Vicar of Cochin until his death on 27 March 1760.

While bishop, he was the principal consecrator of Edmond Bennetat, Coadjutor Vicar Apostolic of Cochin and Titular Bishop of Eucarpia (1748).
