= Diocese of Qui Nhơn =

Catholic diocese in Vietnam

Coordinates: 13.7752°N 109.2350°E

Diocese of Qui Nhon Dioecesis Quinhonensis Giáo phận Qui Nhơn

Catholic
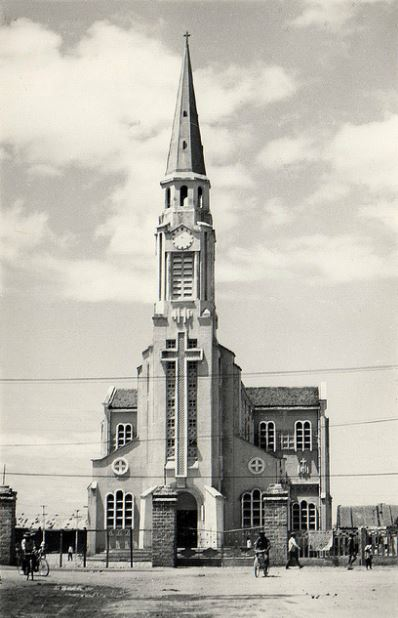
- Our Lady of Assumption

- Coat of arms of Bishop Matthew Nguyễn Văn Khôi

Location
- Country: Vietnam
- Ecclesiastical province: Huế
- Metropolitan: Huế

Statistics
- Area: 16,194 km^{2} (6,253 sq mi)
- Population: Total; Catholics: (as of 2022); 4,725,310; 78,746 (1.7%)
- Parishes: 62

Information
- Denomination: Catholic
- Sui iuris church: Latin Church
- Rite: Roman Rite
- Established: September 09, 1659 - established as Apostolic Vicariate; November 24, 1960 - elevated as Diocese
- Cathedral: Cathedral of the Assumption in Qui Nhơn
- Patron saint: Saint Joseph

Current leadership
- Pope: Leo XIV
- Bishop: Matthieu Nguyễn Văn Khôi
- Metropolitan Archbishop: Joseph Ðặng Ðức Ngân
- Coadjutor: John Baptist Nguyễn Quốc Hưng (elect)

Website
- Website of the Diocese

The Diocese of Qui Nhơn (also written as the Diocese of Quy Nhơn; Latin: Dioecesis Quinhonensis; Vietnamese: Giáo phận Qui Nhơn) is a Catholic diocese in central Vietnam. The Bishop is Matthieu Nguyễn Văn Khôi, previously rector of Assumption Cathedral in Quy Nhơn and professor at the Stella Maris Major Seminary of Nha Trang, was appointed Coadjutor Bishop of the diocese by Pope Benedict XVI on December 31, 2009. The creation of the diocese in present form was declared on 24 November 1960.

The diocese covers an area of 16,200 km², and is a suffragan diocese of the Archdiocese of Huế.

By 2004, the diocese of Qui Nhơn had about 62,520 Catholics (1.7% of the population), 70 priests and 36 parishes.

Assumption Cathedral in Quy Nhơn town has been assigned as the cathedral of the diocese.

== Ordinaries ==
=== Vicariate Apostolic of Cochin (1658-1844) ===
Vicar Apostolic		Period in office	Status	Reference
1	Bishop Pierre Lambert de la Motte, M.E.P.	July 29, 1658 – June 15, 1679	Died in office	
2	Bishop Guillaume Mahot, M.E.P.	January 29, 1680 – June 04, 1864	Died in office	
3	Bishop Joseph Duchesnes	1864 – June 17, 1864	Died in office	
4	Bishop François Perez	February 05, 1687 – September 20, 1728	Died in office	
5	Bishop Alexandre de Alexandris, B.	September 20, 1728 – September 13, 1738	Died in office	
6	Bishop Valère Rist, O.F.M.	1737 – April 13, 1743	Died in office	
7	Bishop Arnaud-François Lefèbvre, M.E.P.	October 06, 1741 – March 27, 1760	Died in office	
8	Bishop Guillaume Piguel, M.E.P.	July 29, 1762 – June 21, 1771	Died in office	
9	Bishop Pierre-Joseph-Georges Pigneau de Béhaine, M.E.P.	September 24, 1771 – October 09, 1799	Died in office	
10	Bishop Jean Labartette, M.E.P.	October 09, 1799 – August 06, 1823	Died in office	
11	Bishop Jean-Louis Taberd, M.E.P.	September 18, 1827 – July 31, 1840	Died in office	
12	Bishop Étienne-Théodore Cuenot, M.E.P.	July 31, 1840 – March 02, 1844	Remained as Vicar apostolic of Eastern Cochin.	

Coadjutor Vicar Apostolic of Cochin

Vicar Apostolic		Period in office	Reference
1	Bishop Charles-Marin Labbé, M.E.P.	January 15, 1697 – March 24, 1723	
2	Bishop Alexandre de Alexandris, B.	December 22, 1725 – September 20, 1728	
3	Bishop Valerian Rist, O.F.M.	October 03, 1735 – September 15, 1737	
4	Bishop Edmond Bennetat, M.E.P.	September 22, 1745 – July 16, 1758	
5	Bishop Jean Labartette, M.E.P.	March 30, 1784 – October 09, 1799	
6	Bishop Jean-André Doussain, M.E.P.	July 23, 1798 – December 14, 1809	
7	Bishop Pierre-Marie Le Labousse, M.E.P.	1801 – May 28, 1801	
8	Bishop Jean-Joseph Audemard	1817 – August 08, 1821	
9	Bishop Étienne-Théodore Cuenot, M.E.P.	September 09, 1831 – July 31, 1840	
10	Bishop Dominique Lefèbvre, M.E.P.	December 10, 1839 – March 02, 1844	

=== Vicariate Apostolic of Eastern Cochin (1844-1924) ===
Vicar Apostolic		Period in office	Status	Reference
13	Bishop Étienne-Théodore Cuenot, M.E.P.	March 02, 1844 – November 14, 1861	Died in office, Martyred.	
14	Bishop Eugène-Étienne Charbonnier, M.E.P.	September 09, 1864 – August 07, 1878	Died in office	
15	Bishop Louis-Marie Galibert, M.E.P.	May 23, 1879 – April 24, 1883	Died in office	
16	Bishop Désiré-François-Xavier Van Camelbeke, M.E.P.	January 15, 1884 – November 09, 1901	Died in office	
17	Bishop Damien Grangeon, M.E.P.	June 09, 1902 – December 03, 1924	Remained as Vicar apostolic of Quinhon.	

Coadjutor Vicar Apostolic of Eastern Cochin (1844-1921)

Vicar Apostolic		Period in office	Reference
11	Bishop François-Marie-Henri-Agathon Pellerin, M.E.P.	March 11, 1844 – August 27, 1850	
12	Bishop Constant Philomen Jeanningros, M.E.P.	August 24, 1911 – March 21, 1921	

=== Vicariate Apostolic of Quinhon (1924-1957) ===
Vicar Apostolic		Period in office	Status	Reference
18	Bishop Damien Grangeon, M.E.P.	December 03, 1924 – March 03, 1929	Resigned	
19	Bishop Augustin-Marie Tardieu, M.E.P.	December 19, 1929 – December 12, 1942	Died in office	
20	Bishop Paul-Raymond-Marie-Marcel Piquet, M.E.P.	November 11, 1943 – July 05, 1957	Transferred to Nha Trang.	

=== Diocese of Qui Nhon (1960-present) ===
Bishop		Coat of Arms	Period in office	Status	Reference
1	Bishop Pierre-Marie Phạm Ngọc Chi		November 24, 1960 – January 18, 1963	Transferred to Da Nang.	
2	Bishop Dominique Hoàng Văn Ðoàn, O.P.		January 18, 1963 – May 20, 1974	Died in office	
3	Bishop Paul Huỳnh Ðông Các		July 01, 1974 – June 03, 1999	Resigned	
4	Bishop Pierre Nguyễn Soạn		June 03, 1999 – June 30, 2012	Resigned	
5	Bishop Matthieu Nguyễn Văn Khôi		June 30, 2012 – present	Incumbent	

Coadjutor Bishops of Qui Nhon (1976-2012)

Coadjutor Bishop		Coat of Arms	Period in office	Reference
1	Bishop Joseph Phan Văn Hoa		March 30, 1976 – October 06, 1987	
2	Bishop Matthieu Nguyễn Văn Khôi		December 31, 2009 – June 30, 2012	
3	Bishop-elect Jean-Baptiste Nguyễn Quốc Hưng		April 11, 2026 - present	
