= Dominique Hoàng Văn Đoàn =

Vietnamese Roman Catholic prelate (1912–1974)

His Excellency Dominique Hoàng Văn Đoàn O.P.
- Bishop of Qui Nhơn
- Metropolis: Huế
- Installed: 18 January 1963
- Term ended: 20 May 1974
- Predecessor: Pierre Marie Phạm Ngọc Chi
- Successor: Paul Huỳnh Ðông Các
- Previous posts: Vicar Apostolic of Bắc Ninh and Titular Bishop of Saccaea

Orders
- Ordination: 24 December 1939
- Consecration: 18 February 1979 by Pietro Fumasoni Biondi

Personal details
- Born: 5 November 1912 Trà Lũ Đoài
- Died: 20 May 1974 (aged 61) Quy Nhon, Vietnam
- Motto: Narrabo nomen tuum fratribus meis

Dominique Hoàng Văn Đoàn (5 November 1912 – 20 May 1974) was a Vietnamese Roman Catholic prelate. He became a Dominican and was ordained on 24 December 1939. On 12 March 1950, Pope Pius XII appointed him as the Vicar Apostolic of Bắc Ninh and Titular Bishop of Saccaea. He was consecrated on 3 September 1950 by Cardinal Pietro Fumasoni Biondi. In 1963, he was appointed to the Diocese of Qui Nhơn. He died on 20 May 1974, at the age of 61.

Catholic Church titles
Preceded by Pierre Marie Phạm Ngọc Chi	Bishop of Qui Nhơn; 1963–1974	Succeeded by Paul Huỳnh Ðông Các
Preceded by —	Titular Bishop of Saccaea; 1950–1963	Succeeded by Joseph Lawrence Wilhelm
Preceded by Eugenio Artaraz Emaldi	Vicar Apostolic of Bắc Ninh; 1950–1955	Succeeded by Paul Joseph Phạm Đình Tụng
