= Guillaume Piguel =

Most Reverend Guillaume Piguel
- Apostolic Vicar of Cochin
- Church: Catholic Church
- Diocese: Apostolic Vicararite of Cochin
- Predecessor: Arnaud-François Lefèbvre
- Successor: Pierre-Joseph-Georges Pigneau de Béhaine

Orders
- Ordination: December 21, 1748
- Consecration: December 9, 1764 by Pierre Brigot

Personal details
- Born: December 4, 1722 La Mézière, France
- Died: June 21, 1771 (aged 48)

Guillaume Piguel (December 4, 1722 – June 21, 1771) served as the Apostolic Vicar of Cochin (1762–1771).

== Biography ==
Guillaume Piguel was born in La Mézière, France and was an ordained priest of the Société des Missions étrangères de Paris on December 21, 1748. On July 29, 1762, Pope Clement XIII appointed him Apostolic Vicar of Cochin and Titular Bishop of Canatha. On December 9, 1764, he was consecrated bishop by Pierre Brigot, Apostolic Vicar of Siam.
