= Jan Dekert (bishop) =

Bishop Jan Dekert
- Auxiliary bishop of Warsaw
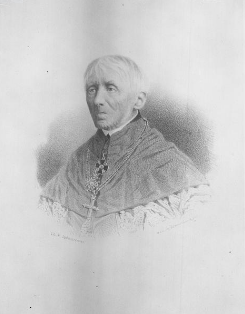
- Jan Deckert
- See: Warsaw
- Appointed: 27 September 1858
- Installed: 16 January 1859
- Term ended: 19 November 1861

Orders
- Ordination: 19 March 1825
- Consecration: 16 January 1859 by Antoni Melchior Fijałkowski

Personal details
- Born: Jan Dekert; November 6, 1786 Warsaw
- Died: November 19, 1861 (aged 75)
- Denomination: Catholic

Jan Dekert (1786 – 1861) was a Polish Catholic priest, auxiliary Auxiliary bishop of Warsaw from 1859–1861. He was the son of mayor of Warsaw Jan Dekert.

Catholic Church titles
| Preceded by Louis-Charles-Auguste Hébert | — TITULAR — Bishop of Halicarnassus; 27 September 1858 - 19 November 1861 | Succeeded by Nicolas Adames |
| Preceded by Tomasz Chmielewski | Auxiliary bishop of Warsaw; 16 January 1859 - 19 November 1861 | Succeeded by Henryk Ludwik Plater |
