= Alexandre de Alexandris =

Most Reverend Alexandre de Alexandris
- Apostolic Vicar of Cochinchina
- Church: Catholic Church
- Diocese: Apostolic Vicariate of Cochinchina
- Predecessor: François Perez
- Successor: Arnaud-François Lefèbvre

Orders
- Consecration: 1726 by François Perez

Personal details
- Born: Italy
- Died: October 10, 1738

Alexandre de Alexandris, B. (died October 10, 1738) served as the Apostolic Vicar of Cochinchina (1728–1738) and Coadjutor Apostolic Vicar of Cochinchina (1725–1728)).

== Biography ==
Alexandre de Alexandris was ordained a priest in the Clerics Regular of St. Paul. On December 22, 1725, Pope Benedict XIII appointed him the Coadjutor Apostolic Vicar of Cochinchina and Titular Bishop of Nabala. In 1726, he was consecrated bishop by François Perez, Apostolic Vicar of Cochinchina. On September 20, 1728, he succeeded to the Apostolic Vicar of Cochinchina. He died on October 10, 1738.
