= Guillaume Mahot =

Most Reverend Guillaume Mahot
- Apostolic Vicar of Cochin
- Church: Catholic Church
- Diocese: Apostolic Vicararite of Cochin
- Predecessor: Pierre Lambert de la Motte
- Successor: François Perez

Orders
- Consecration: October 25, 1682 by Louis Laneau

Personal details
- Born: 1630 Argentan, France
- Died: June 4, 1684 (age 54)

Guillaume Mahot (French pronunciation: [ɡijom mao]; 1630 – June 4, 1684) served as the Apostolic Vicar of Cochin (1680–1684).

== Biography ==
Guillaume Mahot was born in Argentan, France and was an ordained priest of the Société des Missions étrangères de Paris.

On January 29, 1680, Pope Innocent XI appointed him the Apostolic Vicar of Cochin and Titular Bishop of Bida. On October 25, 1682, he was consecrated bishop by Louis Laneau, Apostolic Vicar of Siam.
