= François Perez =

French bishop

Most Reverend François Perez
- Apostolic Vicar of Cochin
- Church: Catholic Church
- Diocese: Apostolic Vicararite of Cochin
- In office: 1687–1728
- Predecessor: Guillaume Mahot
- Successor: Alexandre de Alexandris

Orders
- Ordination: 1668
- Consecration: 29 July 1691 by Louis Laneau

Personal details
- Born: Siam
- Died: 20 September 1728

François Perez (died 20 September 1728) served as the Apostolic Vicar of Cochin (1687–1728).

== Biography ==
François Perez was born in Siam and ordained a priest in 1668. On 5 February 1687 Pope Innocent XI appointed him the Apostolic Vicar of Cochin and Titular Bishop of Bugia. On 29 July 1691 he was consecrated bishop by Louis Laneau, Apostolic Vicar of Siam. he died on 20 September 1728.

While bishop, he was the principal consecrator of Alexandre de Alexandris, Titular Bishop of Nabala (1726) and coadjutor Apostolic Vicar of Cochin.
