= Christianity in Puducherry =

Christianity in Puducherry originated with the Capuchins from Madras who began their missionary activity here. By 1689, the Jesuits began their activity, and in 1773 the Paris Foreign Missions Society continued the mission. At that time, there were 30,000 Catholics in Pondicherry. However, the lack of missionaries and opposition from Padroado mutated the mission.

The Pondicherry vicariate was established in 1845, and in 1887, it became an archdiocese. Christianity accounts for 6% of Puducherry's population.

Christians in Puducherry
Year	Number	Percentage
2001	67,688	6.95
2011	78,550	6.29

== History ==
With a land area of 11,348 square kilometers, the Archdiocese of Pondicherry and Cuddalore extends over the Pondicherry and Karaikal civil districts of the Puducherry Union Territory and the civil districts of Cuddalore and Vilpuram of Tamil Nadu State. In 2001, the total population of the area was 6,151,891. Ethnic groups in the territory include Tamils and French.

=== The mission of the Jesuits and the Capuchins ===
It is said that Saint Francis Xavier, during his travels to Japan and China, briefly stayed at what is now called Uppalam. At Church commemorating his visit now stand at Uppalam, Netaji Nagar, Pondicherry

The great ancestor of this archdiocese is the Carnatic Mission, which was started around the year 1700 as Mission sui iuris. This Carnatic Mission was known as the Missions of the Coromandel Coast and also as the Malabar Mission.

Before the establishment of the Carnatic Mission in 1700, the Jesuit Fathers of the Madurai Mission, especially St. John de Brito came into The Gingee Kingdom after 1660 and preached the Gospel up to the Palar river, South of Madras. Also, members of various religious orders, looked after the spiritual needs of the European communities in their trading centres along the coastal areas like Cuddalore, Porto Novo etc., The French Capuchins first settled in Pondicherry in 1674 and the French Jesuits, expelled from Siam (Thailand) also took refuge in Pondicherry in 1688. But, in 1693, the Dutch chased away all the religious from Pondicherry and they could come back only in 1699. While the Capuchins were looking after the Europeans in Pondicherry, the French Jesuits organized the Carnatic Mission for the Indian people.

=== The boundaries of Carnatic Mission ===
The boundaries of the Carnatic mission were as follows:

- On the south and west, the Ponnaiyar River, beyond which were the Madurai Mission and the Mysore mission.
- On the east, the Bay of Bengal, and
- On the north, Kurnool including the Krishna and Godavari areas near the sea shore.

=== Jesuits replaced by foreign mission fathers ===
The continual wars in the 18th century, the ruin of Pondicherry in 1761 and the suppression of the Society of Jesus in 1773, hit badly this vast Carnatic Mission.

In 1776, the French Jesuit fathers were replaced at the order of Rome by the foreign Mission French Fathers. Although the bishop of these new missionaries had all the power of jurisdiction, he was not given the title 'Vicar Apostolic', but called as the 'Superior of the Mission of the Coromandel Coast'. Rome successively gave him the jurisdiction over the Madurai, Coimbatore and Mysore areas, affected by the suppression of the Society of Jesus. So, around 1800, the extent of the Carnatic Mission was immense, but the laborers were very few.

=== The first vicar apostolic and the first archbishop ===
The Carnatic Mission was reorganized when new Vicariates Apostolic were created: Vicariate Apostolic of Madras in 1832, of Madurai in 1836 and the Vicariates of Visakhapatnam, Mysore and Coimbatore in 1845.

Pondicherry became a vicariate apostolic of the Coromandel coast, on 1 September 1836, with Mgr. Bonnand as its first vicar apostolic. This vicariate apostolic was raised to an archbishopric on 1 September 1886, with Mgr. Laouenan as the first archbishop.

Subsequently, subdivisions of the archdiocese took place, erecting the new Dioceses of Kumbakonam in 1899 and Salem in 1930. In 1928 a great part of the present Diocese of Vellore was separated from the Archdiocese of Pondicherry and attached to the Archdiocese of Madras. On a reorganization of the archdiocese by Rome in 1969, Madurantagam Taluk of Chingleput District was transferred to the Archdiocese of Madras and the Tiruvannamalai Taluk to Vellore.

=== The final formation ===
As the Archdiocese of Pondicherry extended over the Puducherry Union territory and the South Arcot District of Madras State, it was given a new title by Rome: "Archdiocese of Pondicherry and Cuddalore" on 7-8-1953.

Originally, the archdiocese was looking after the ex-French settlements of the Puducherry Union territory namely Karaikal, Chandranagore, Mahe, and Yanam. Another ex-French settlement was also looked after by the MSFS Fathers in Vizagapattinam. Chandranagore was re-allocated to the Archdiocese of Calcutta and Mahe to the Diocese of Calicut in Kerala in 1949.

The present Archdiocese of Pondicherry & Cuddalore extends over the Pondicherry and Karaikal districts of Puducherry and the Cuddalore district (excluding Chidambaram and Kattumannarkoil Taluks) and Villupuram District in Tamil Nadu.
