= Immaculate Conception Cathedral, Pondicherry =

Coordinates: 11.93299°N 79.83055°E

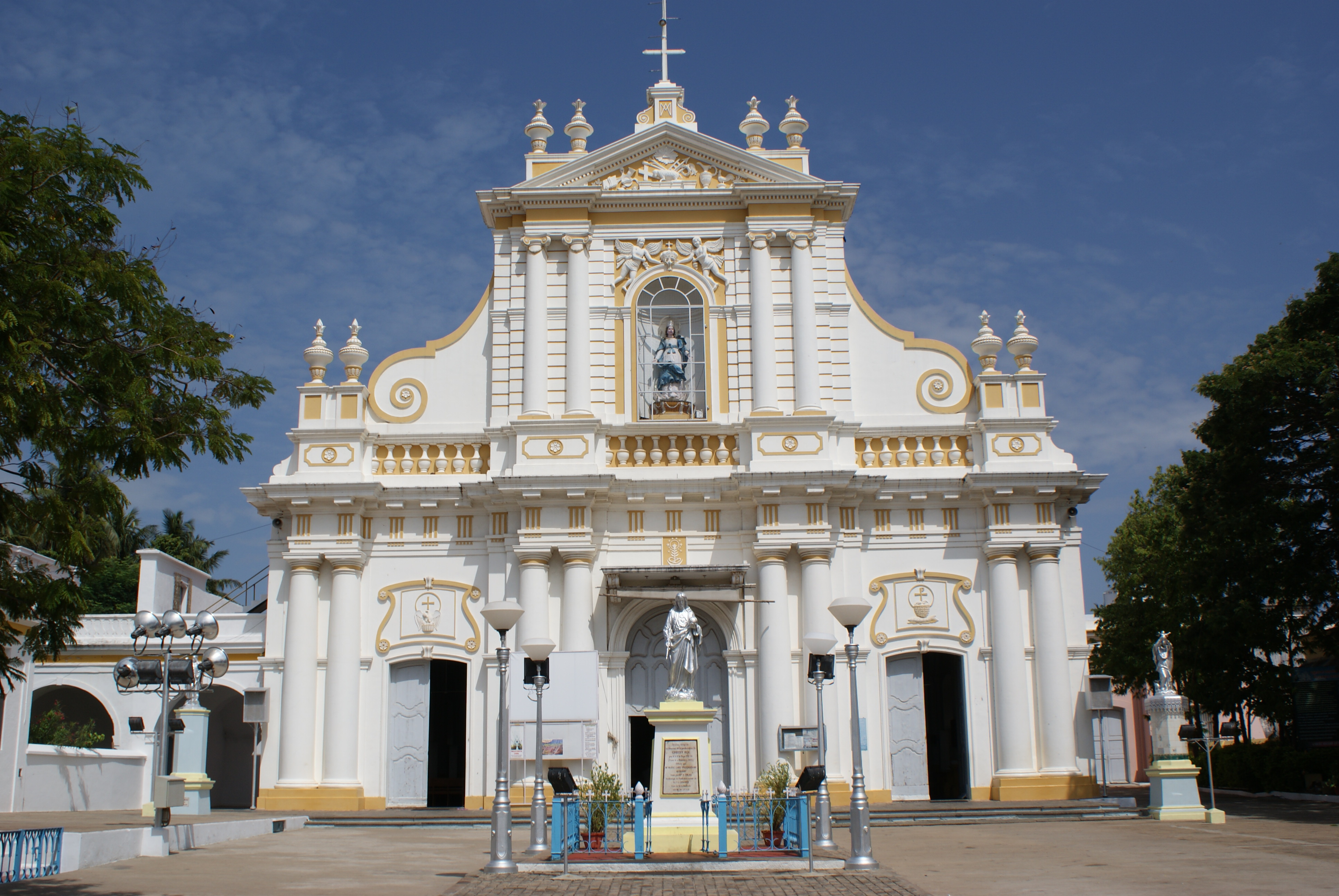
- Front view of the cathedral with Sacred Heart of Jesus statue visible.

- Immaculate Conception Cathedral, Pondicherry
- Location: Pondicherry, Puducherry
- Country: India
- Denomination: Catholic

History
- Former name: St. Paul's Church
- Status: Cathedral and Parish church
- Founder: Jesuits
- Dedication: Immaculate Conception of Blessed Virgin Mary
- Consecrated: 1791

Architecture
- Functional status: Active
- Architectural type: Cathedral
- Style: Herrerian
- Groundbreaking: 1699
- Completed: 1791
- Demolished: Three time in the years: 1693 by Dutch; Around 1730; 1761 by British; But church was re-built at the same site every time.

Administration
- Archdiocese: Archdiocese of Pondicherry and Cuddalore
- Parish: Cathedral Parish

Clergy
- Archbishop: Msgr. Francis Kalist
- Priest: Rev. Fr. Alphonse Sandanam

Immaculate Conception Cathedral (French: Cathédrale de l'Immaculée-Conception de Pondichéry, Tamil: தூய அமலோற்பவ அன்னை பேராலயம்) is the cathedral mother church for the Roman Catholic archdiocese of Pondicherry and Cuddalore. It is located in the Union territory of Puducherry. The church is also known as Samba Kovil (Tamil: சம்பா கோயில்), which is a phonetic corruption of "Saint Paul's Kovil" where "Kovil" means church.

== History ==
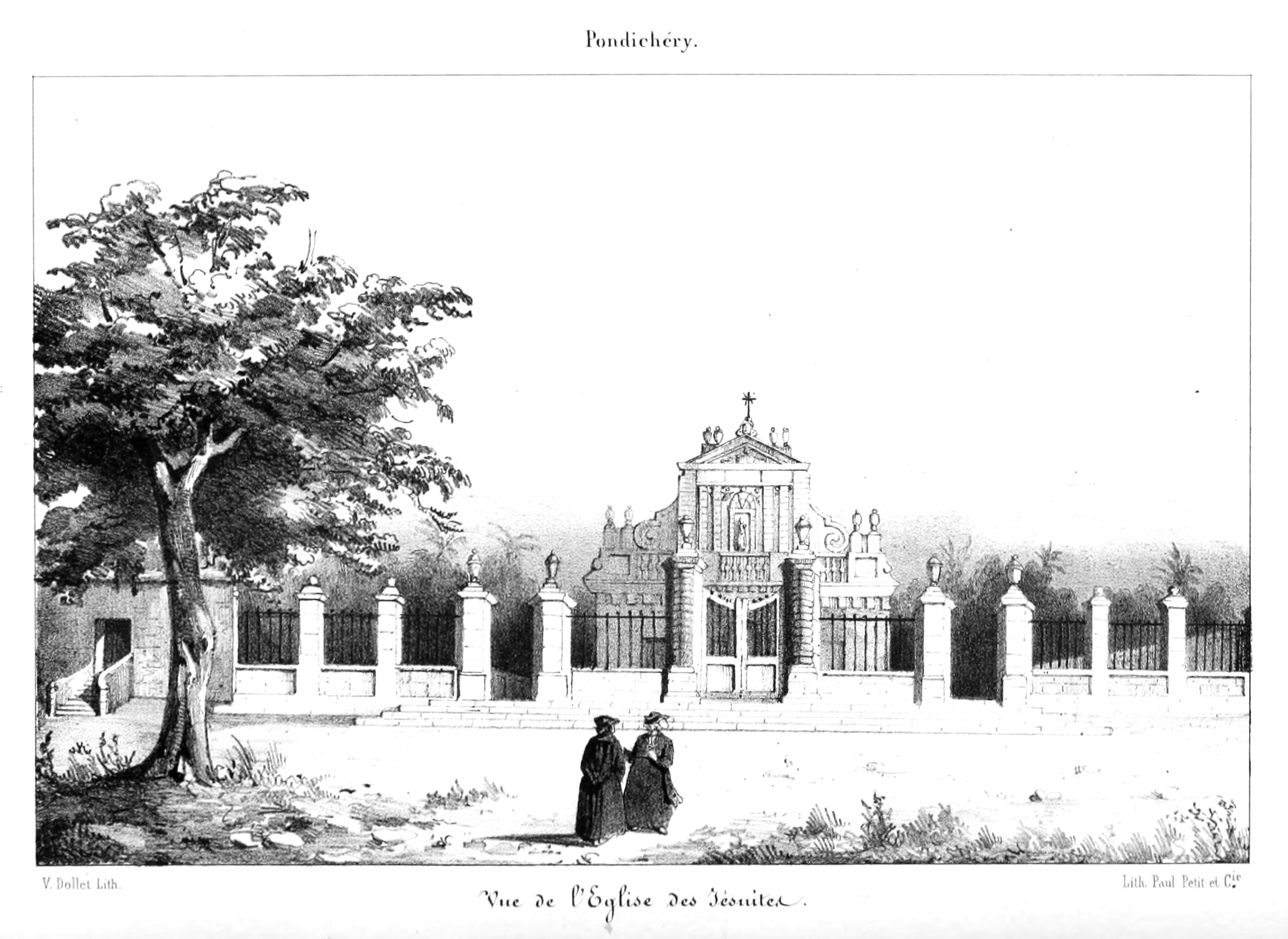

The Jesuit Fathers came to the French colony of Pondicherry as missionaries in 1689. There they bought a very large garden to the west of the French Fort. In 1692 they, with the financial help of Louis XIV, king of France, erected a church which was demolished by the Dutch in the following year. A second Church was quickly built in 1699 but could not last long.

From 1728 to 1736 a large church was built on the site of the present Cathedral. This third church was razed to the ground by the British in 1761 during the Seven Years' War.

Erecting in 1765 provisionally (fourth in serial) a functional kind of irregularly shaped shed where the Mission Press (official press depot of the archdiocese) is now since the year 1770 the Fathers were earnest in building the present cathedral on the foundations of the 3rd Church. On 20 June 1791, the main work was finished and the Church was consecrated by Bishop Champenois. The Bell Tower was built later. The choir loft was added in 1905. The Sanctuary was remodeled in the year 1970. The esplanade in front of the Cathedral was remodeled in 1987, to allow people to take part in liturgical ceremonies and special functions held outside.

The Fest of this Church i.e., Immaculate Conception of Blessed Virgin Mary falls on 8 December. Now the church which stands for around 300 years is also the place where the bishop's house is situated. Mass services are conducted in Tamil and English.

It is one of the oldest tourist sites in Puducherry and was visited by Mother Teresa during her visit to Puducherry.

== Gallery ==
=== The Church ===
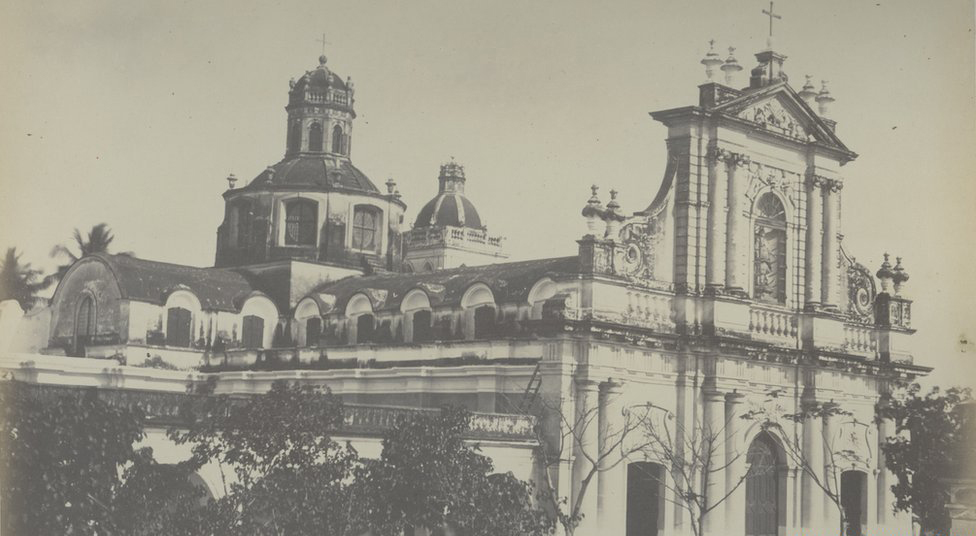
Photo taken in 1860, possibly by French photographer Charles Moyne.

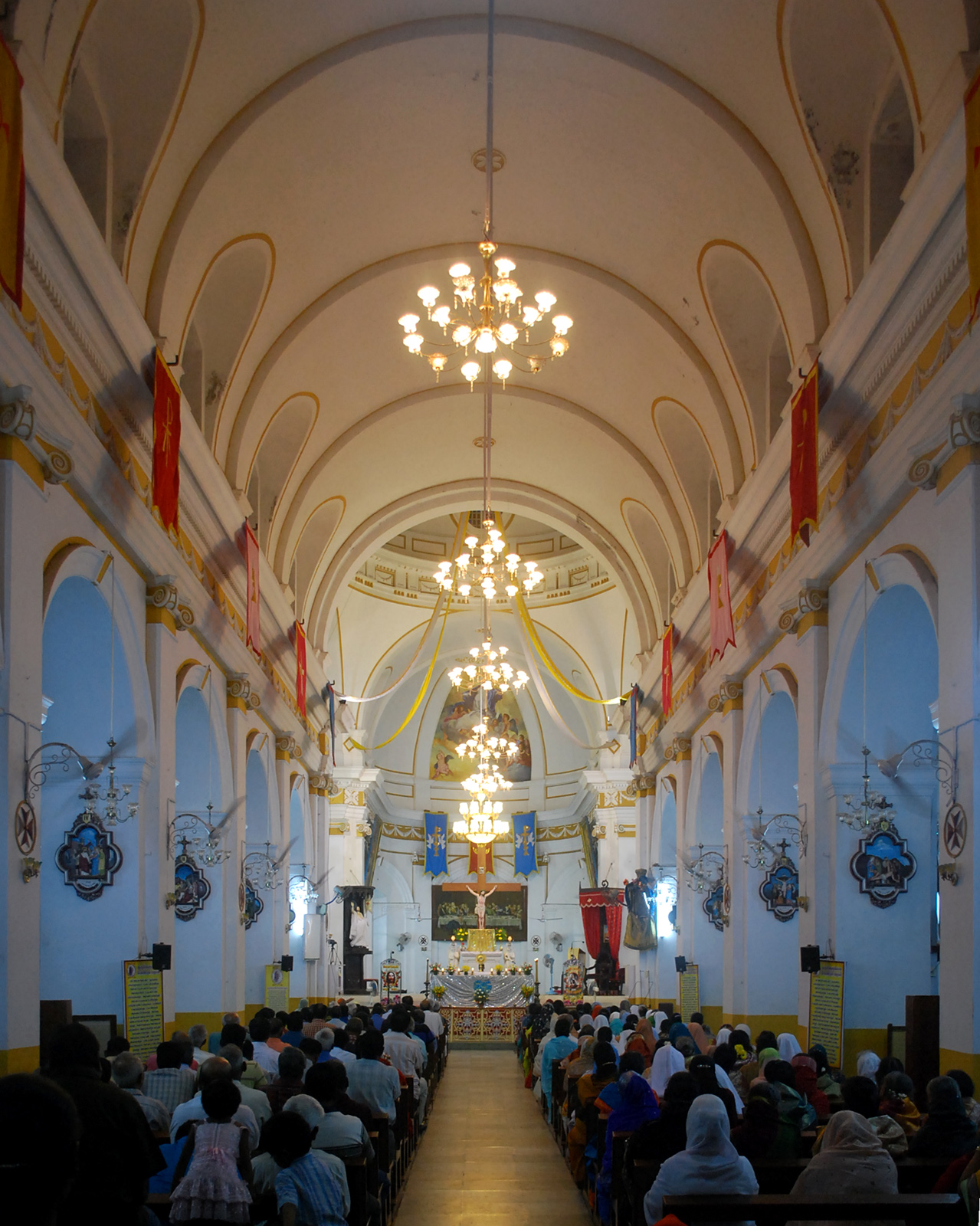
Nave

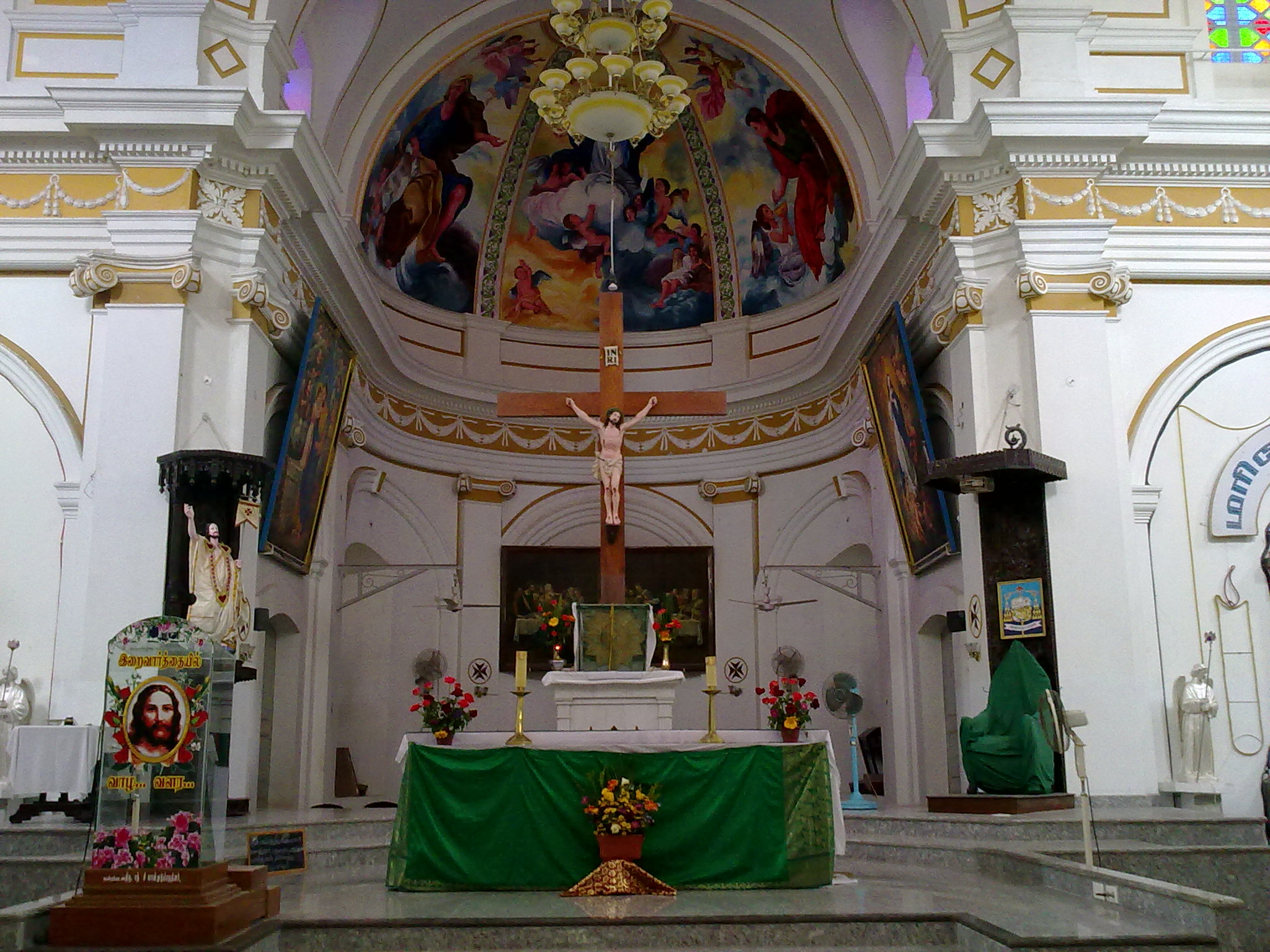
Central altar of the church with the bishop's cathedra visible on the right hand side covered with a green cloth

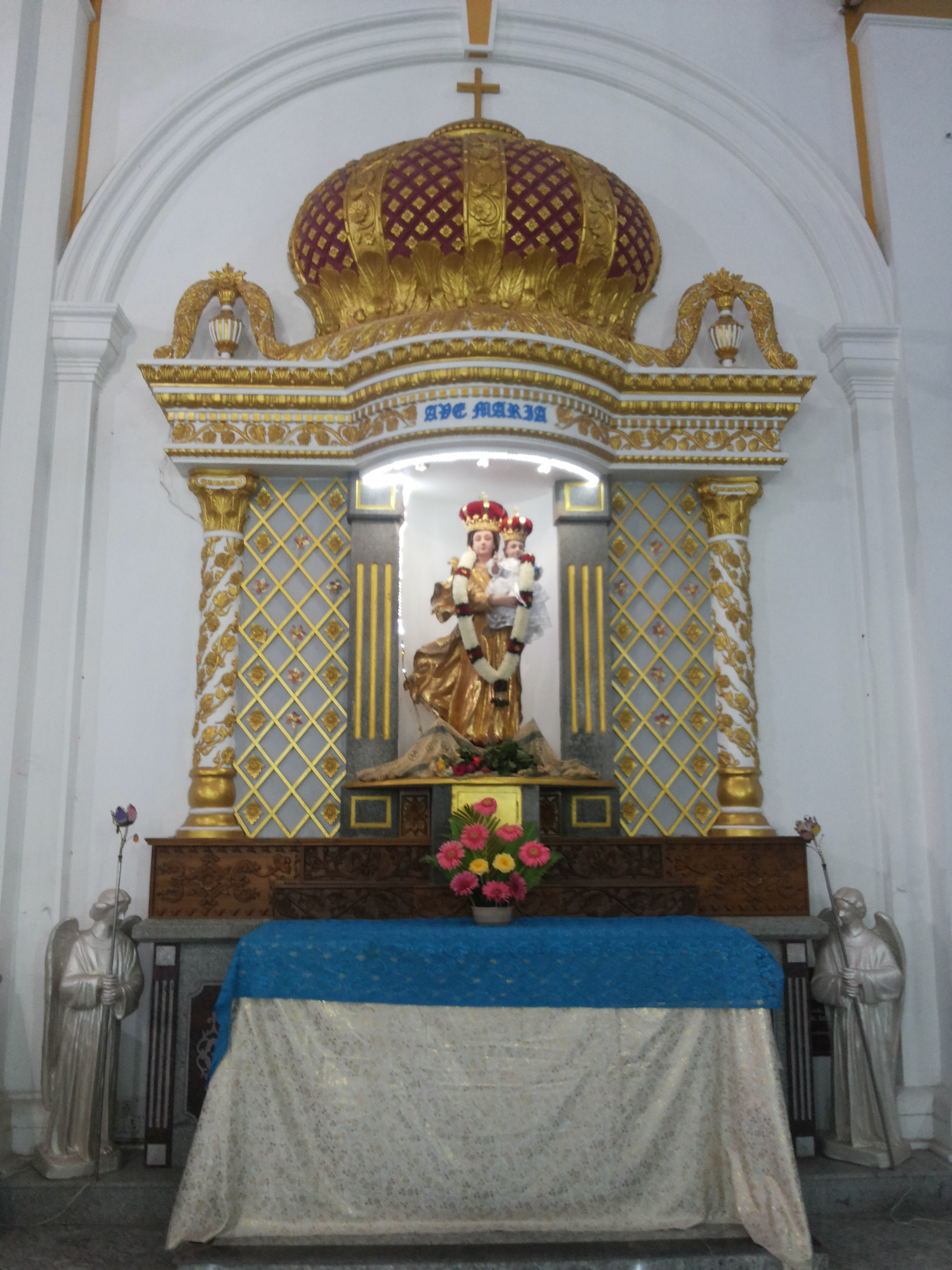
Right side Altar for Our Lady of Immaculate Conception, renovated during the year of Faith

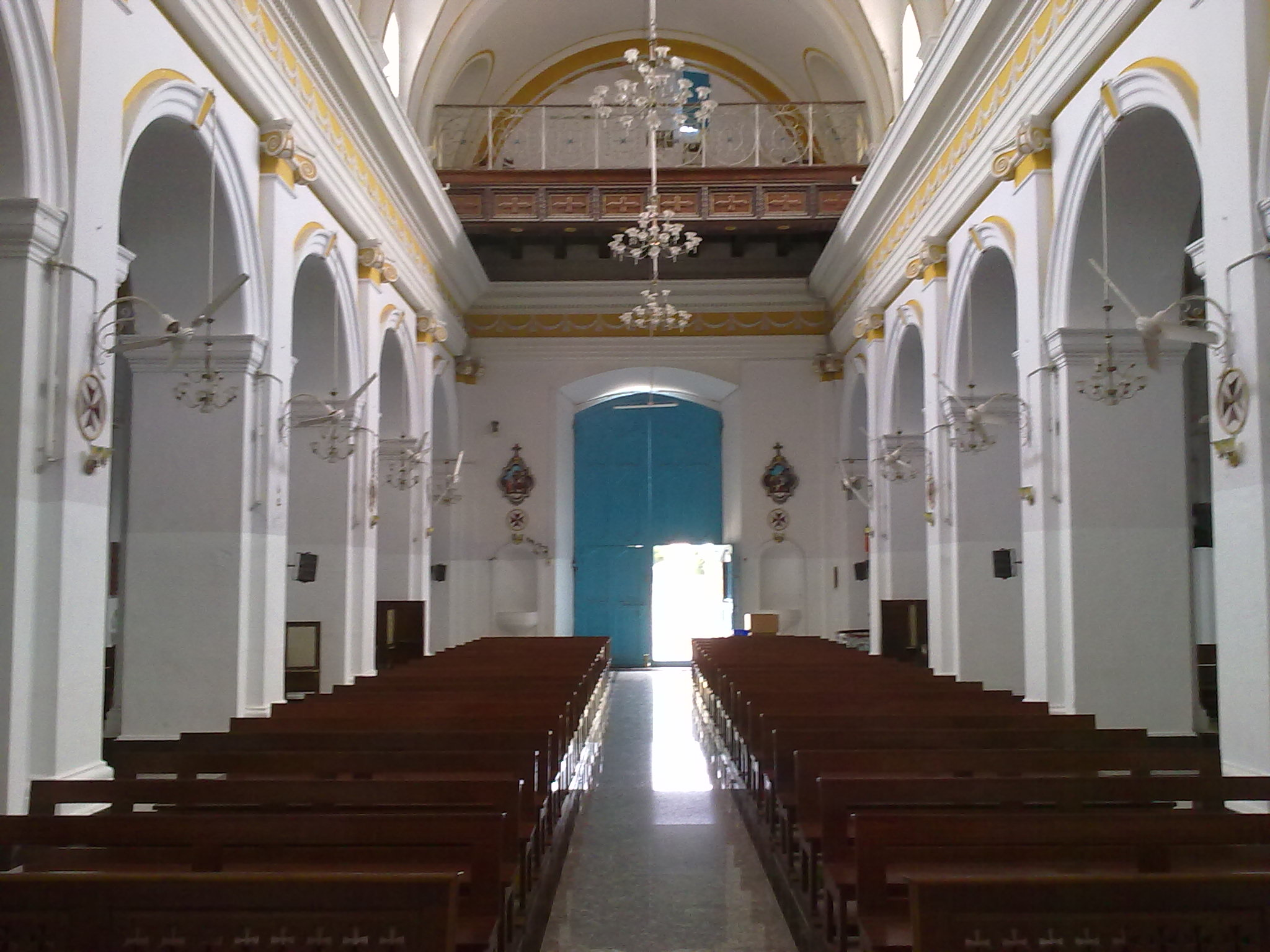
Main Door - View from the central high altar

=== Statues and Altars in the Church ===
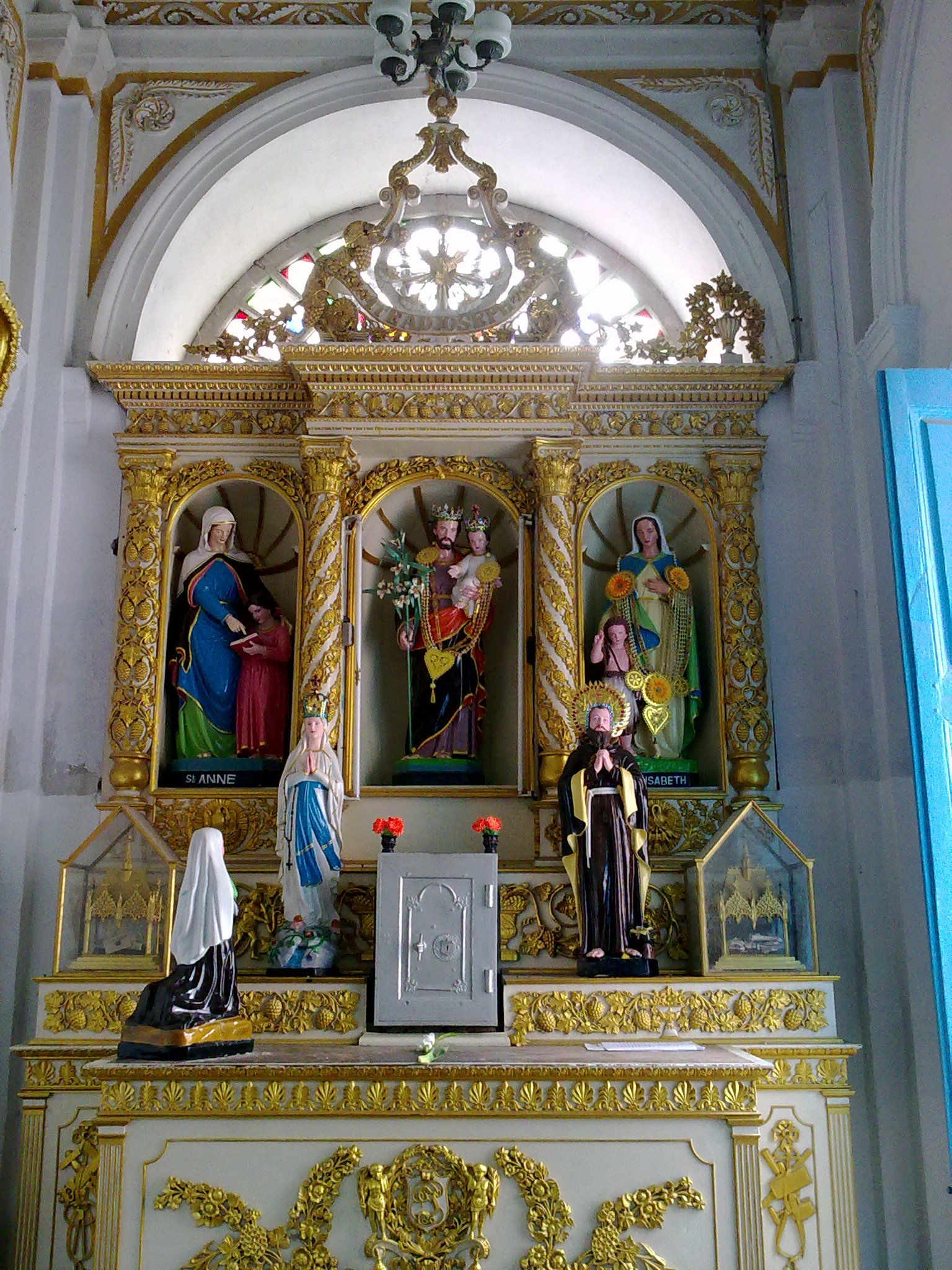
St. Joseph's Altar

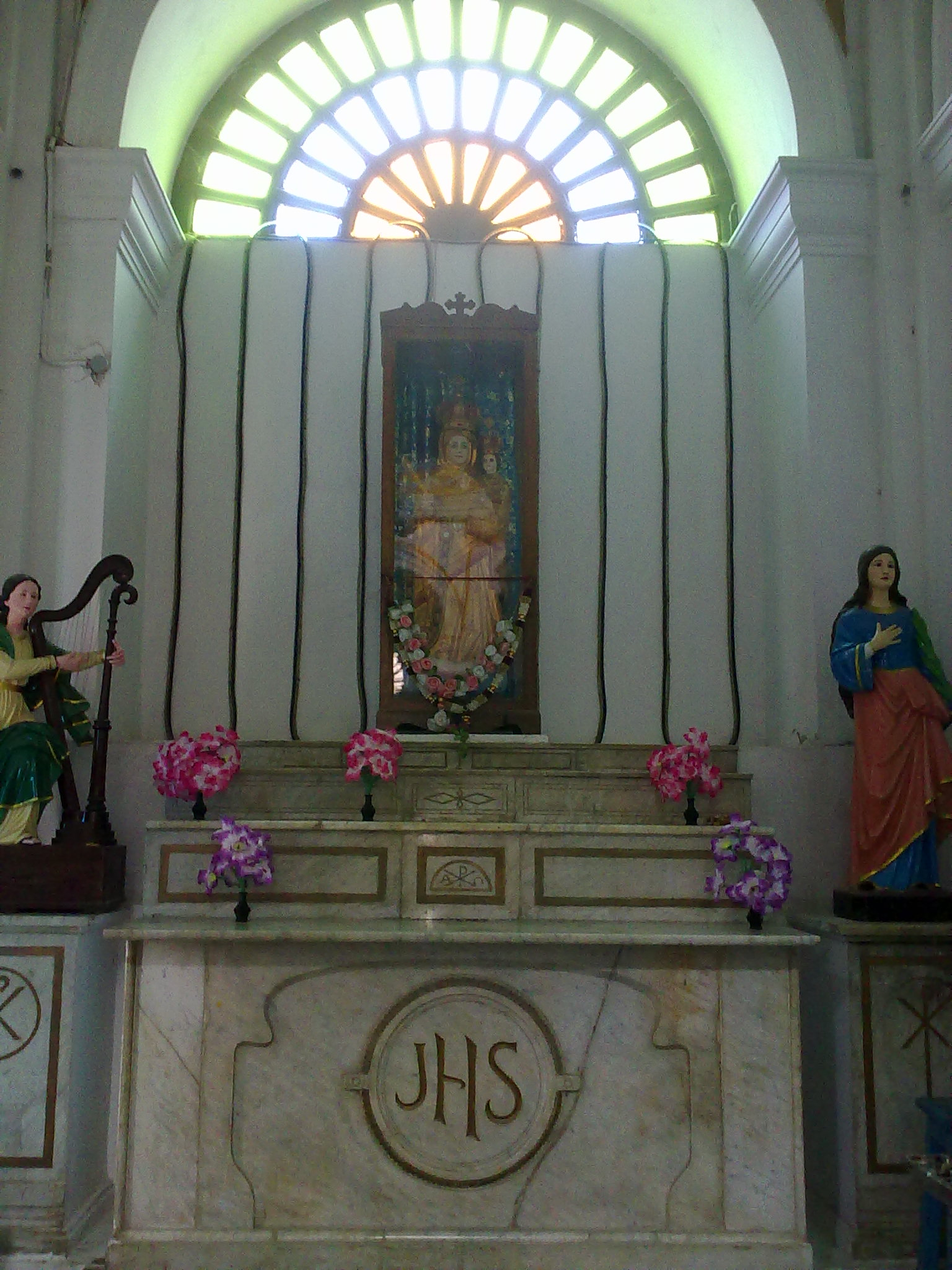
Our Lady of Good Health Altar

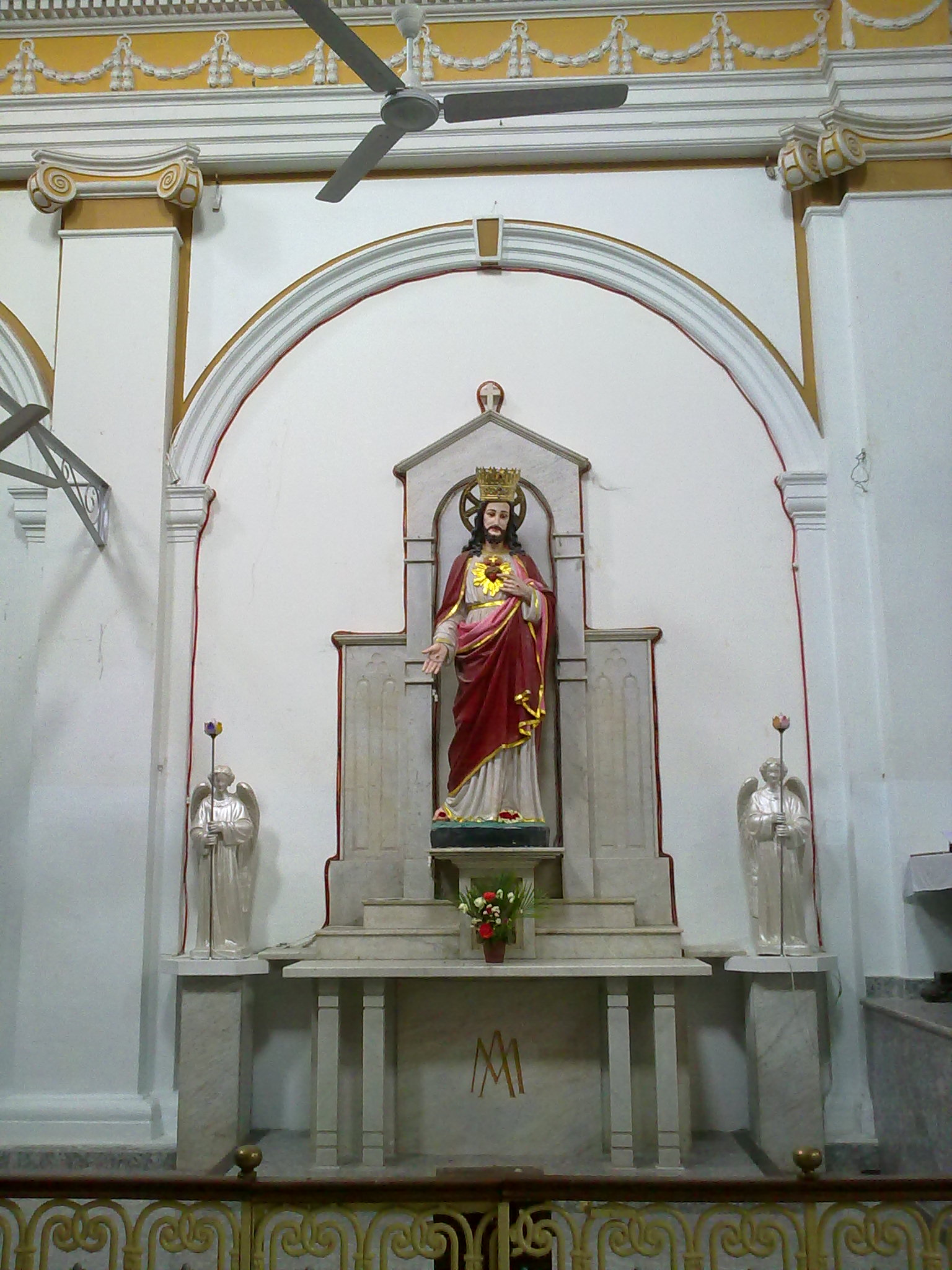
Sacred Heart Altar

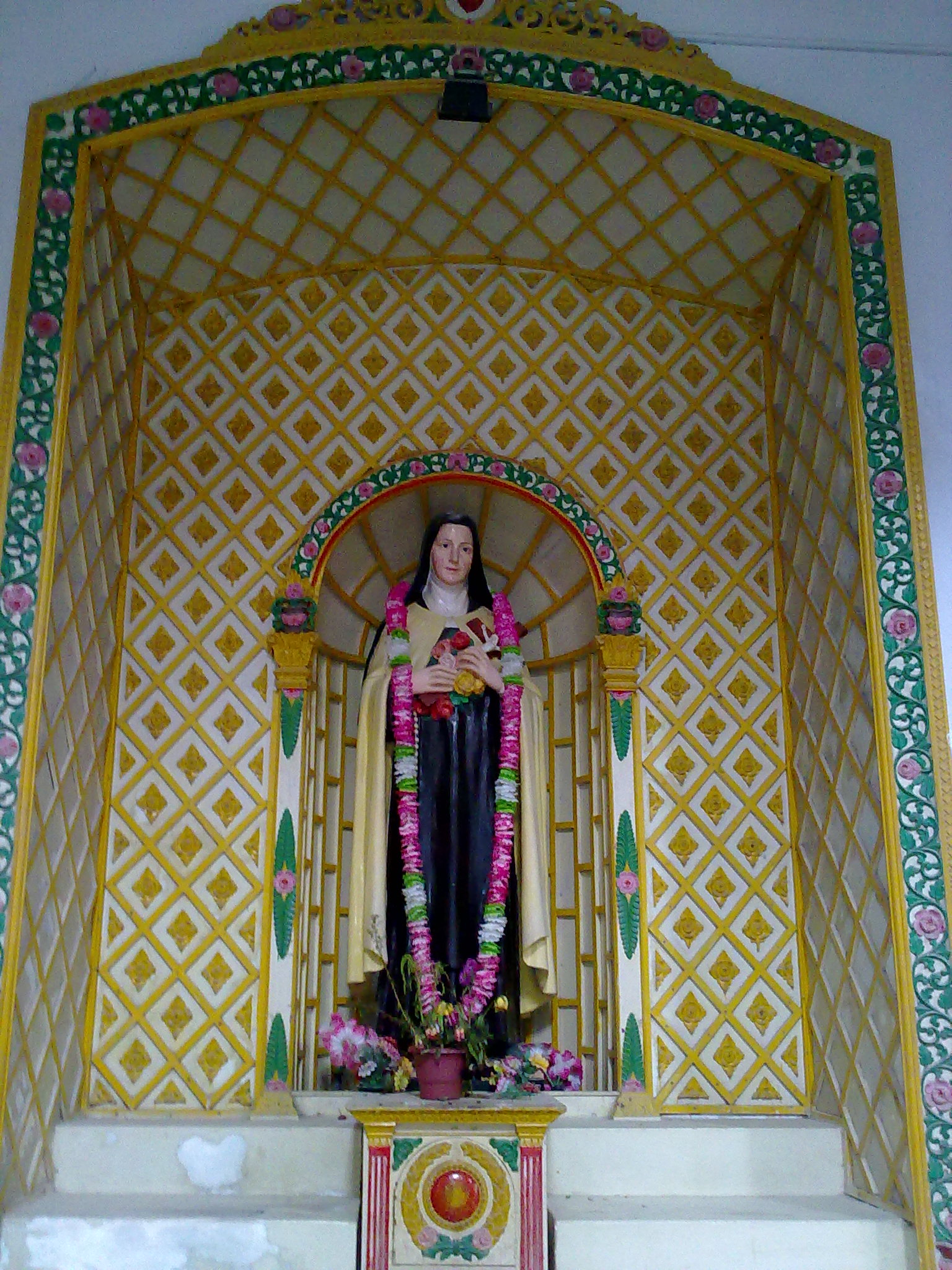
St. Theresa of Lisieux Altar

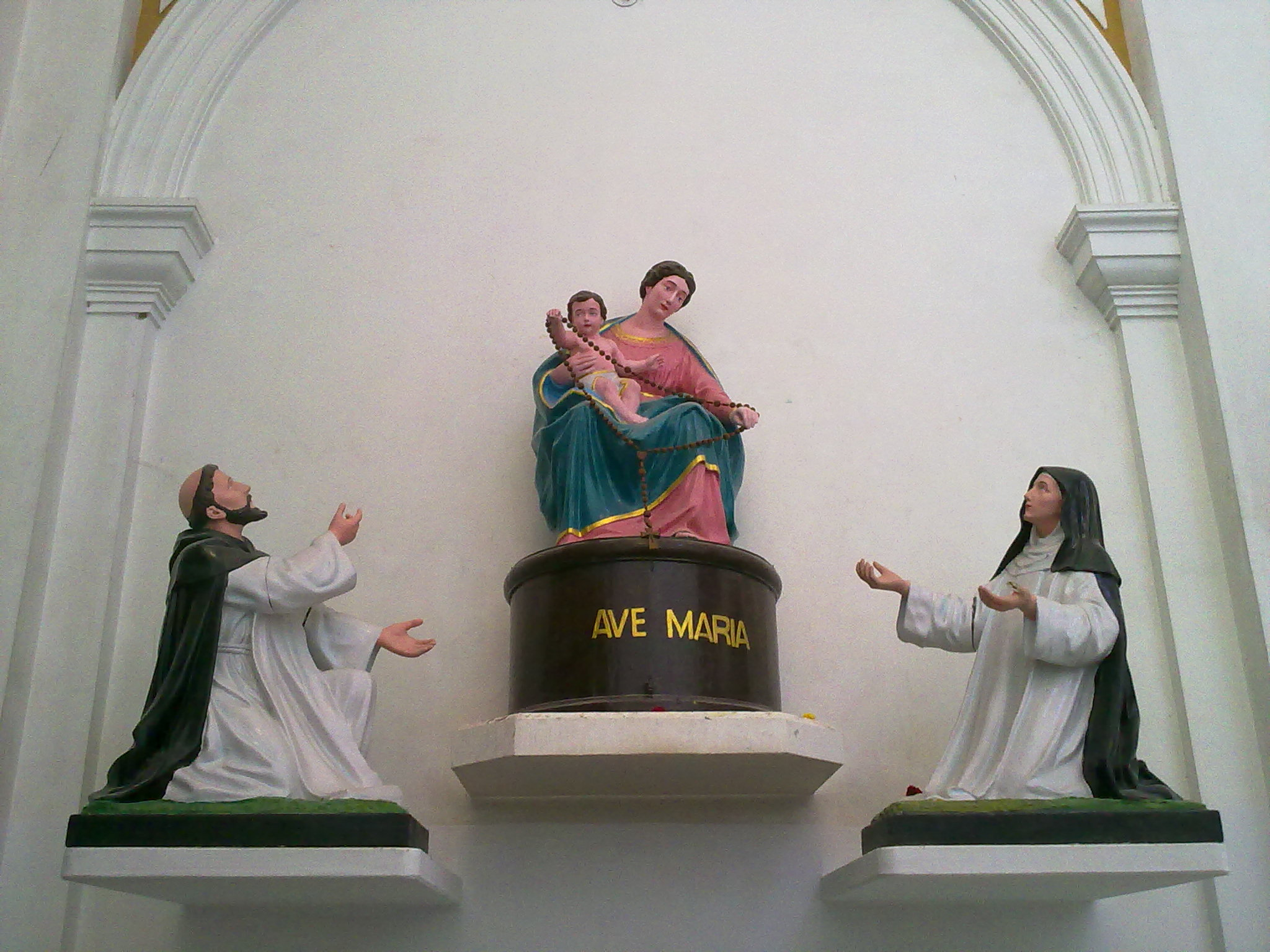
Our Lady of Holy Rosary with St. Dominic

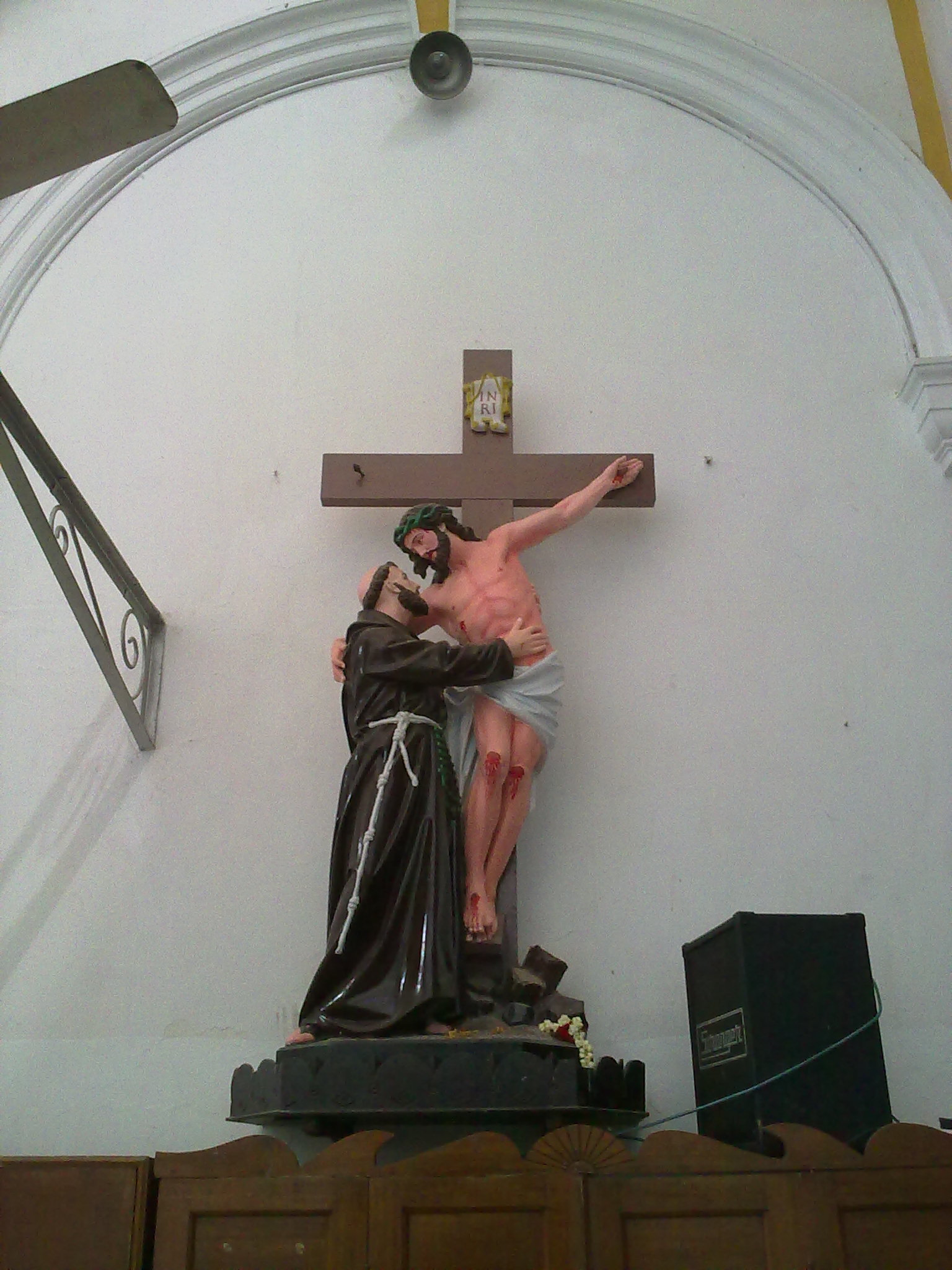
St. Francis of Assisi

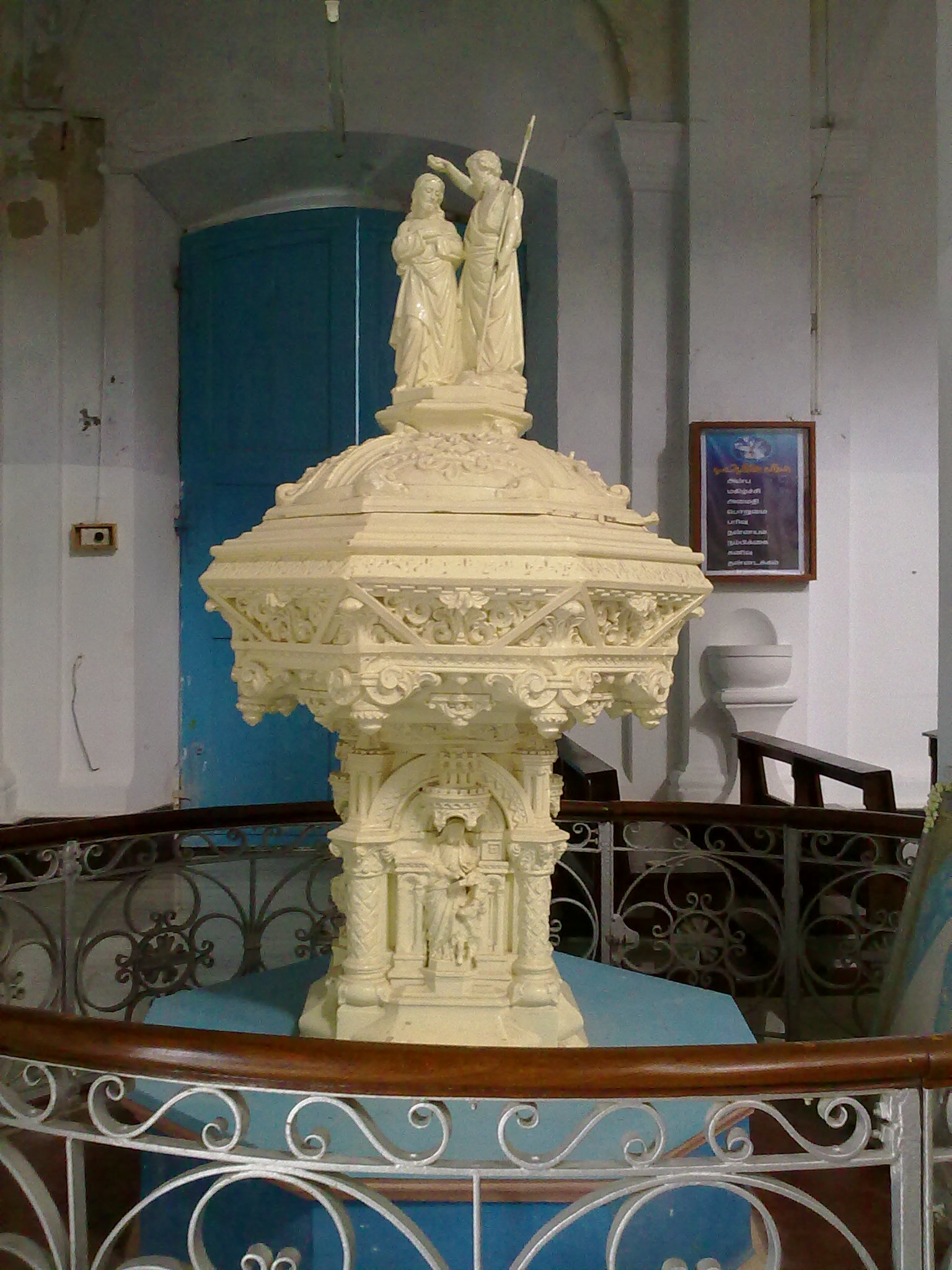
Baptismal font

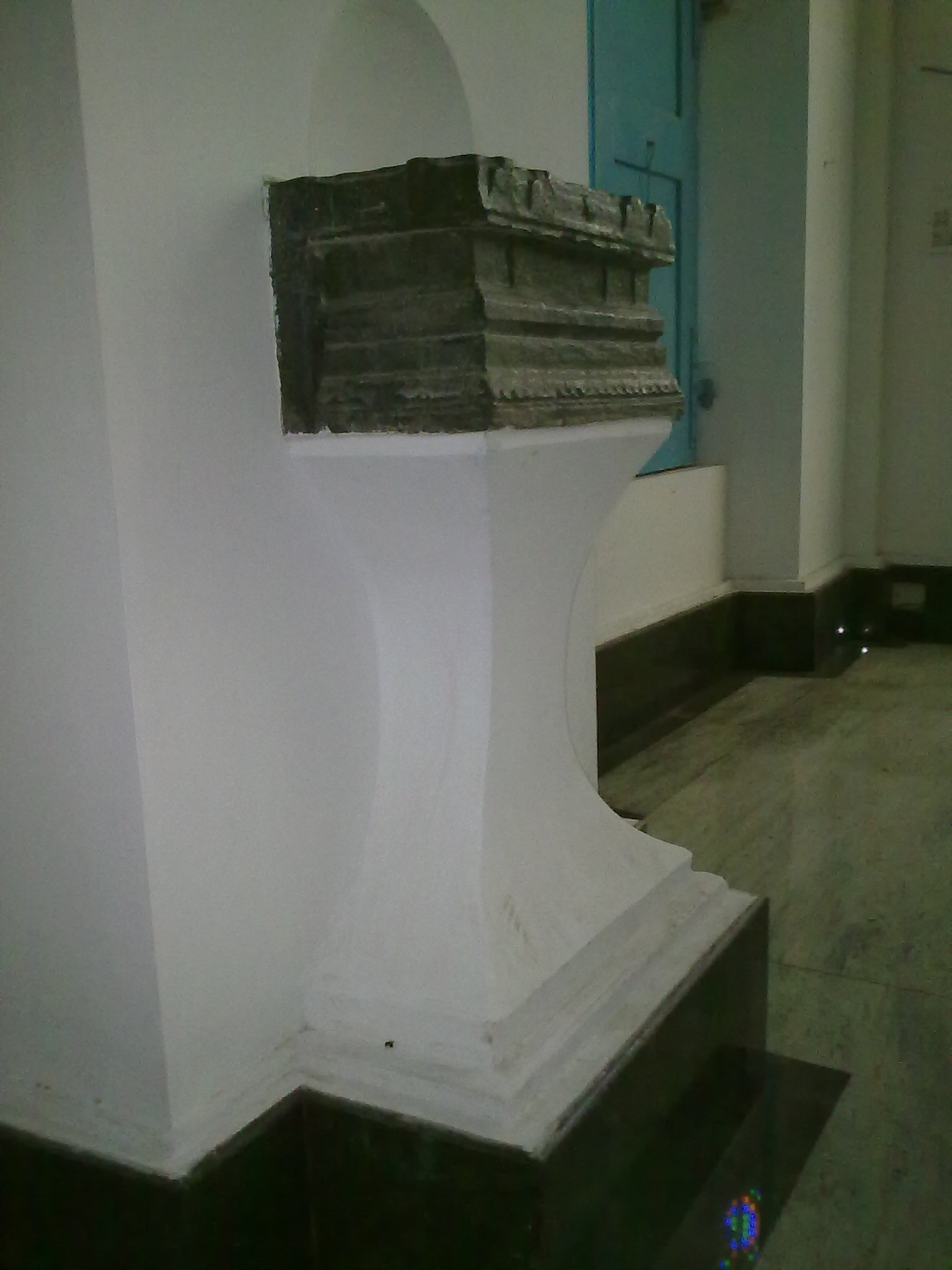
Stoups

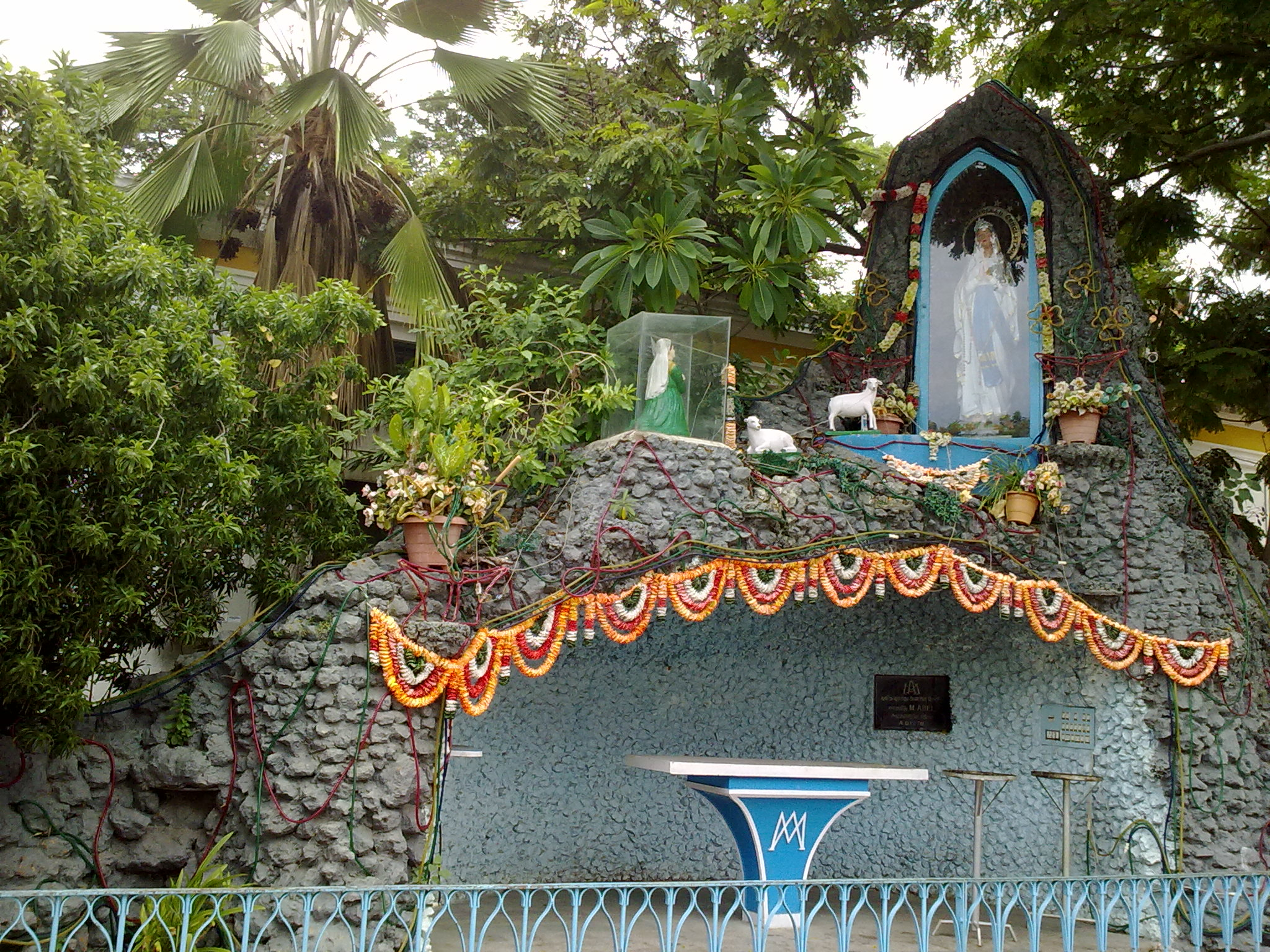
Grotto near the gate

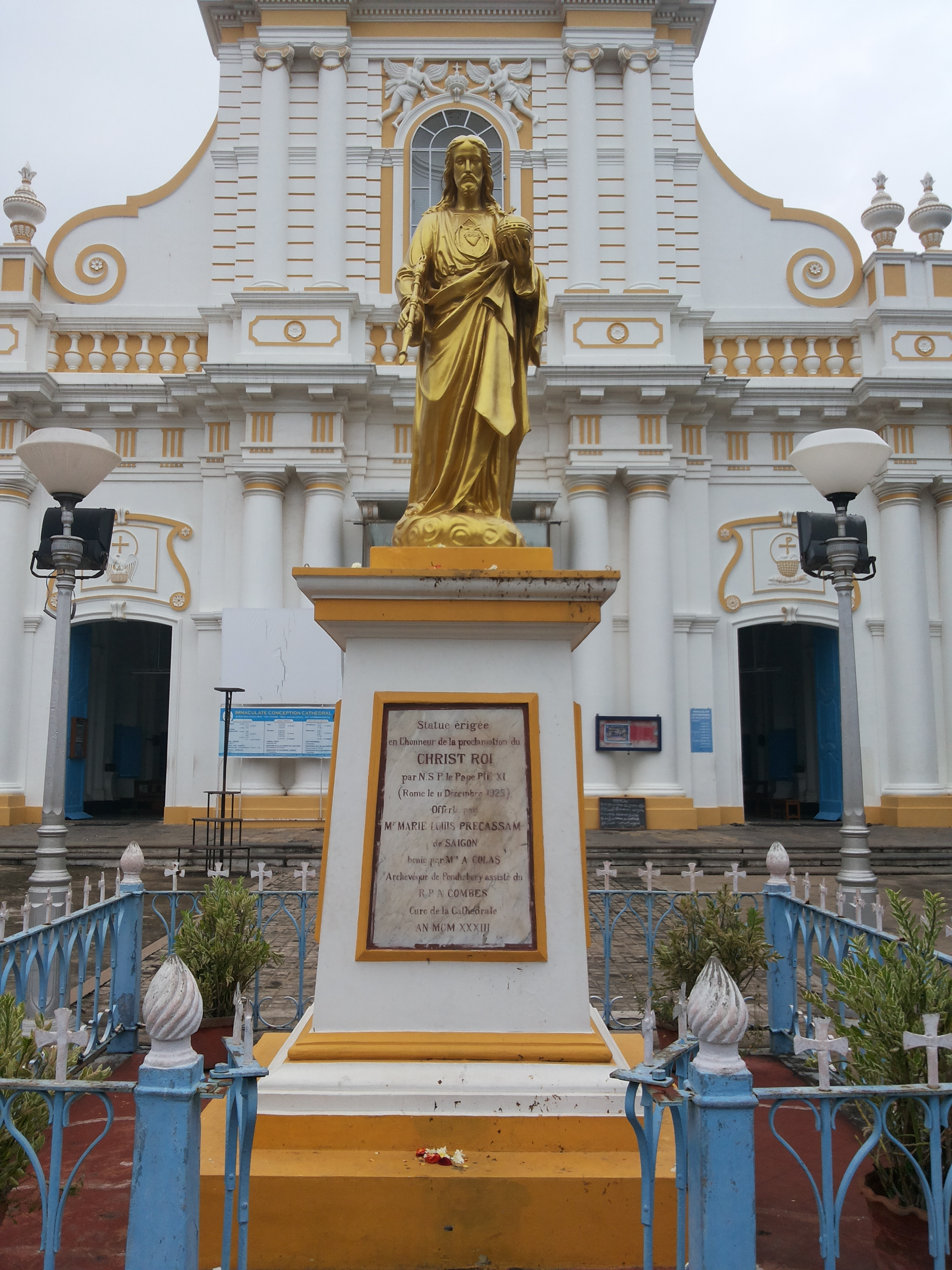
Christ the King statue installed by Bishop Colas in 1933

=== Cathedral Cemetery ===
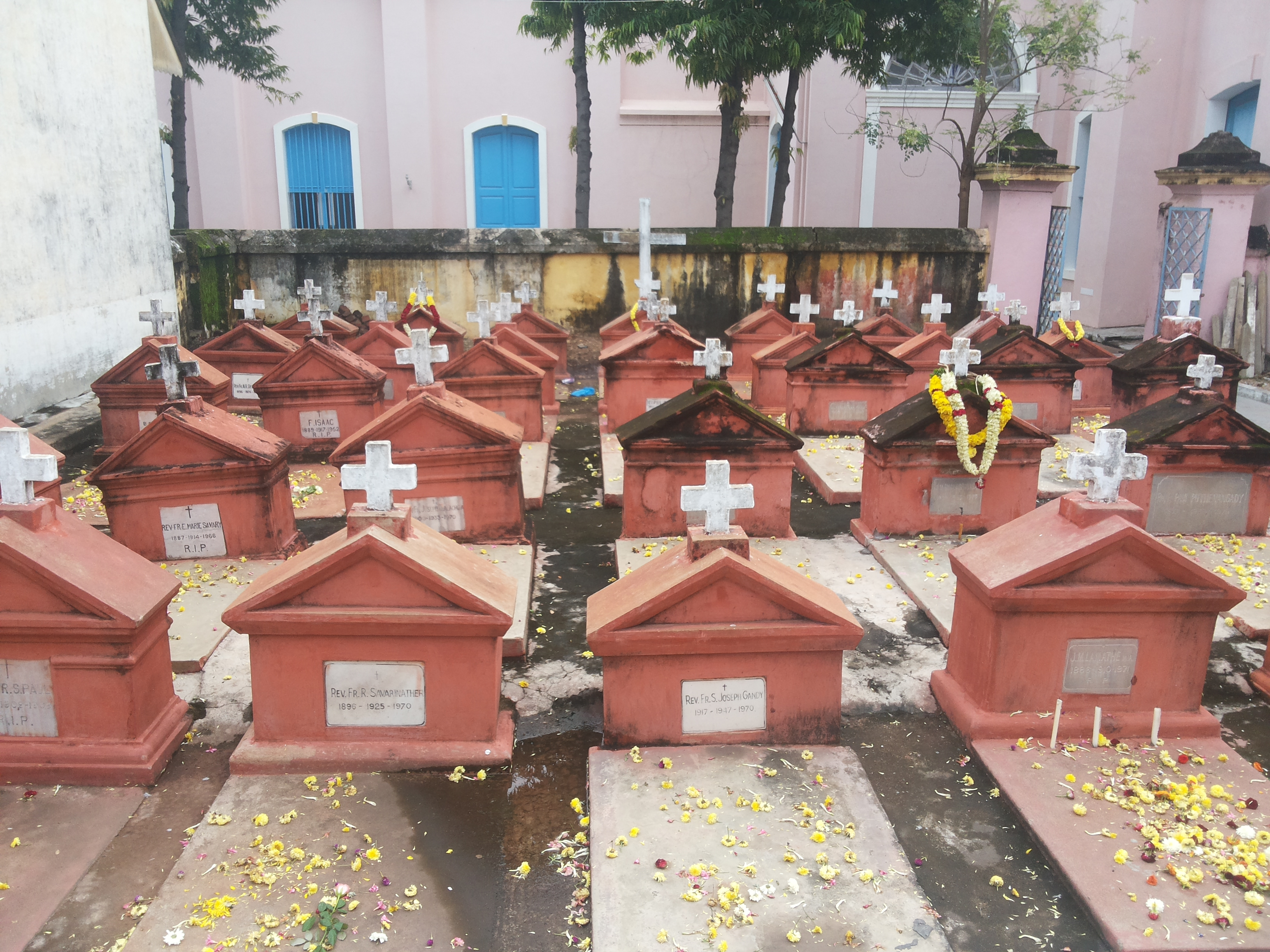

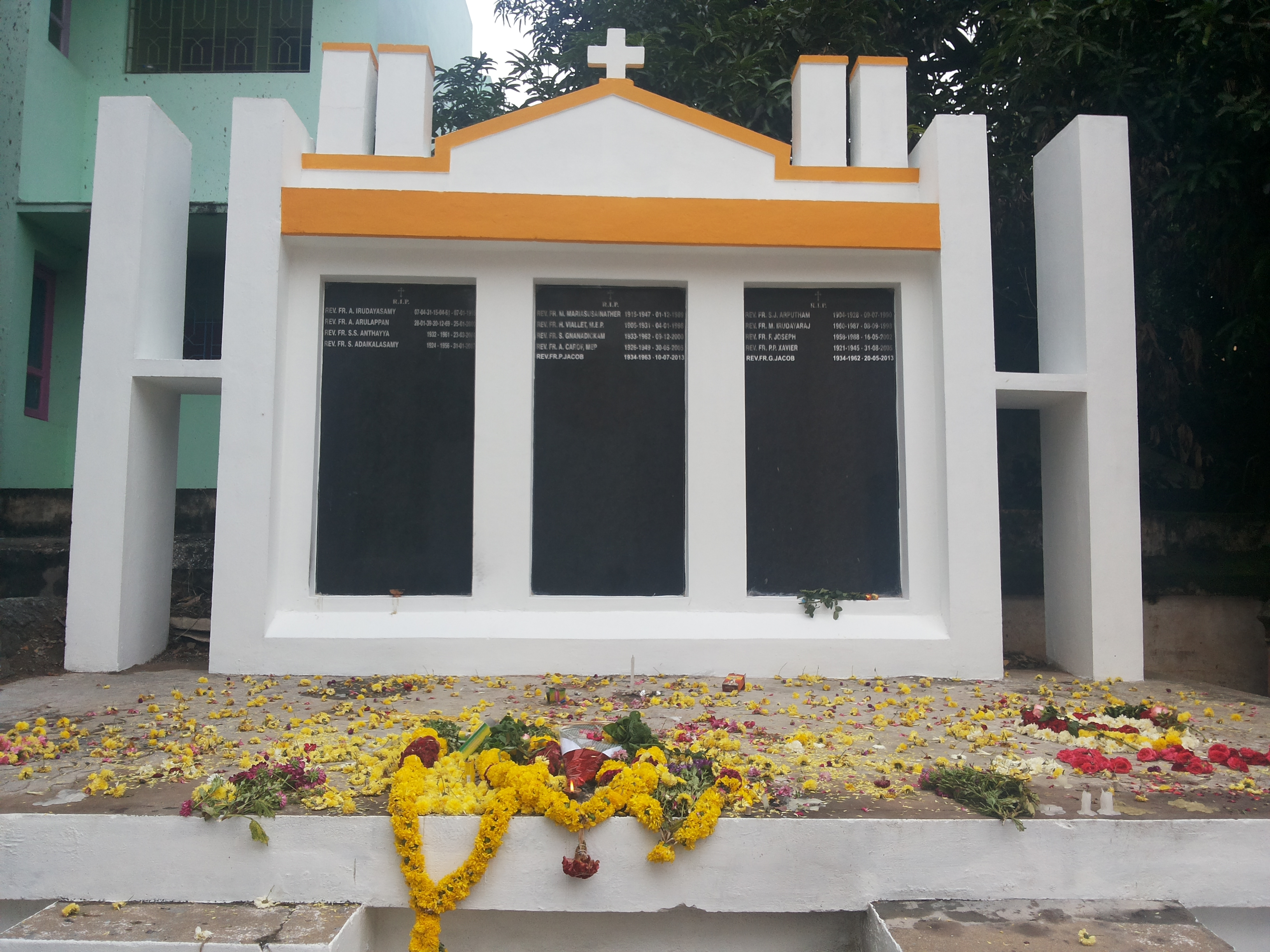

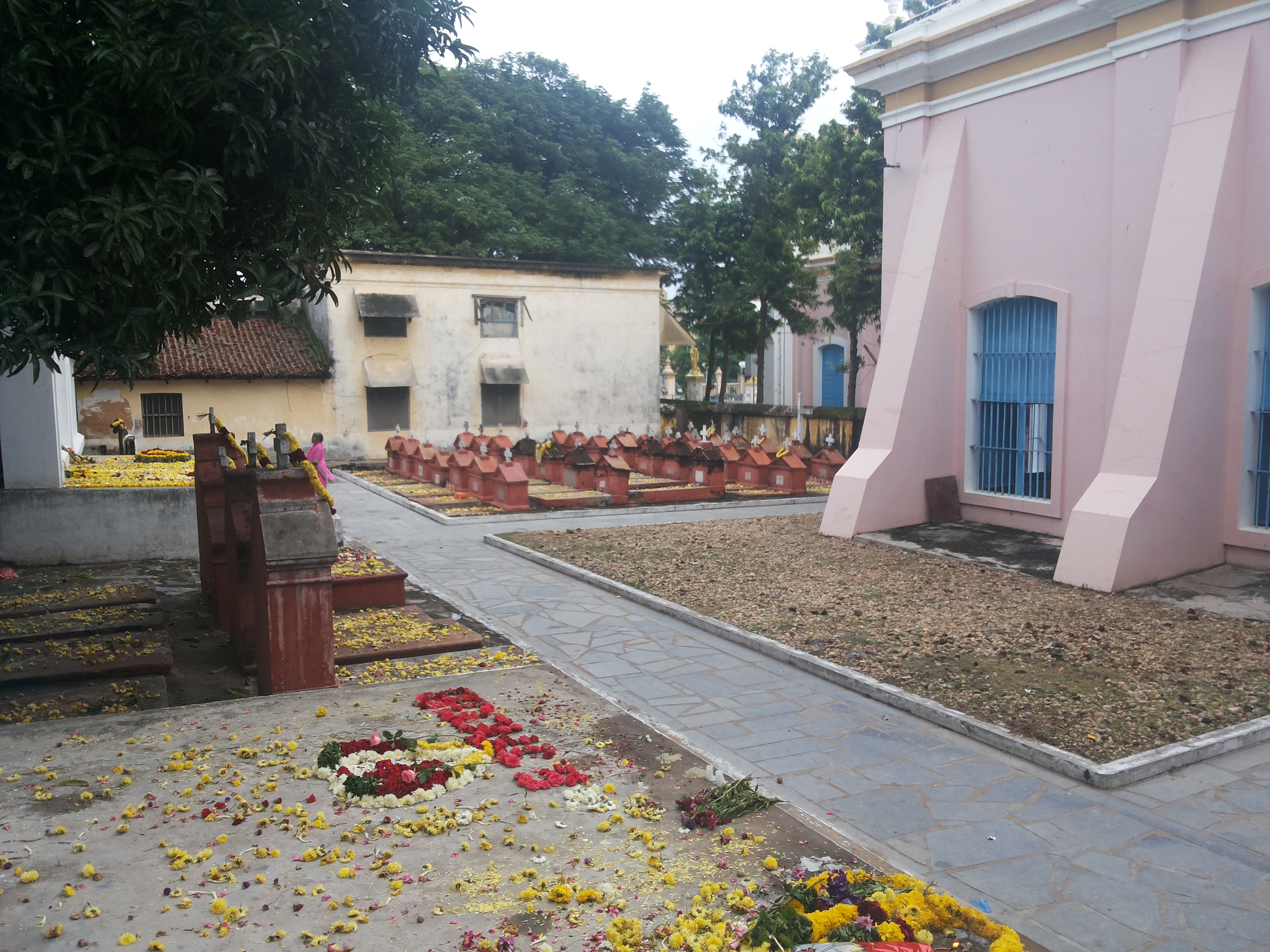

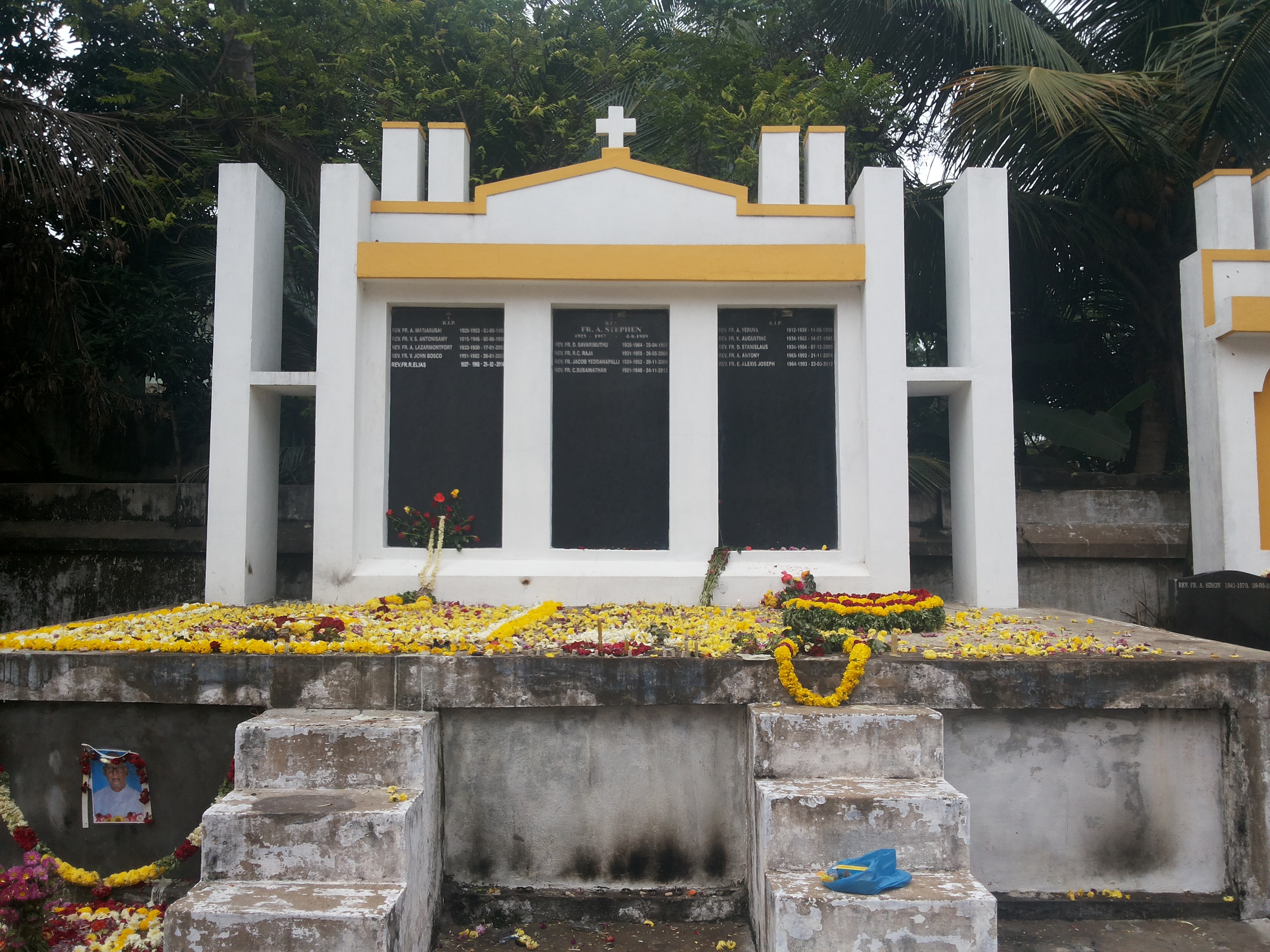

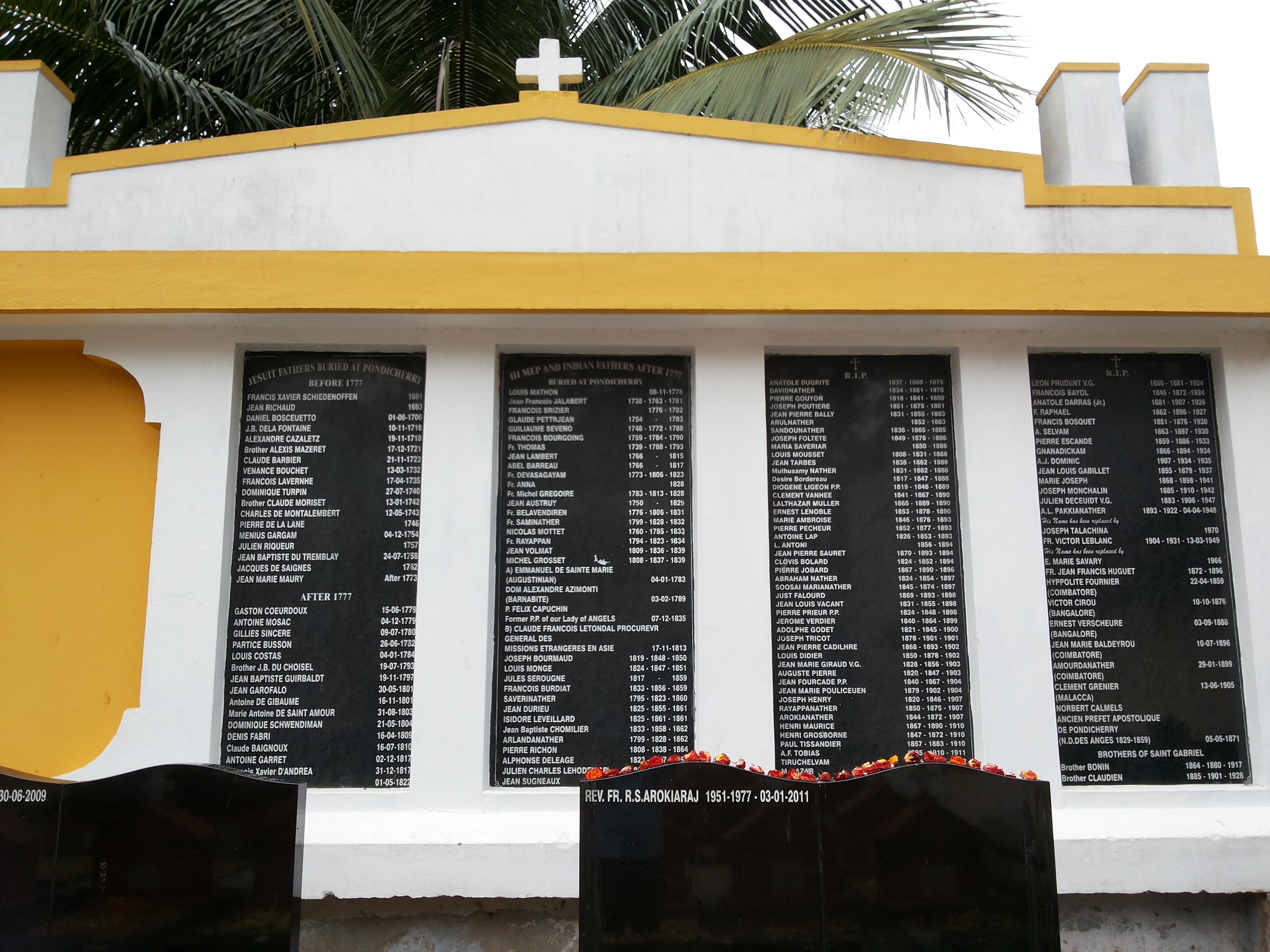
Missionaries buried here

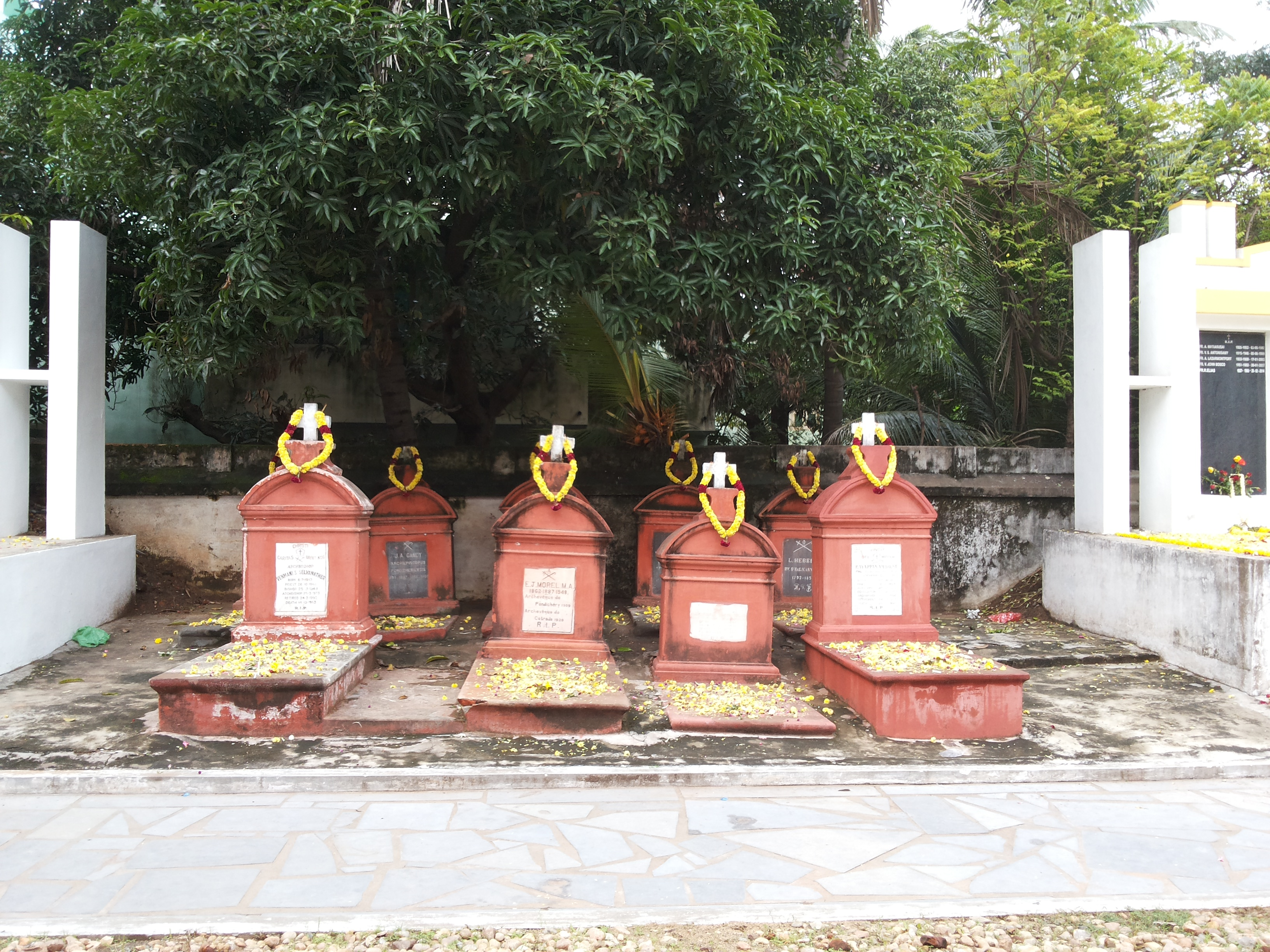
Tombs of Bishops of the Archdiocese

== See also ==
- Roman Catholic Archdiocese of Pondicherry and Cuddalore
- Roman Catholicism in India
- Christianity in India
- Christianity in Puducherry
- List of cathedrals named after the Immaculate Conception of Blessed Virgin Mary
- List of Jesuit sites
