= Diocese of Vijayapuram =

Roman Catholic diocese in Kerala, India

Diocese of Vijayapuram Dioecesis Viiayapuramensis വിജയപുരം രൂപത
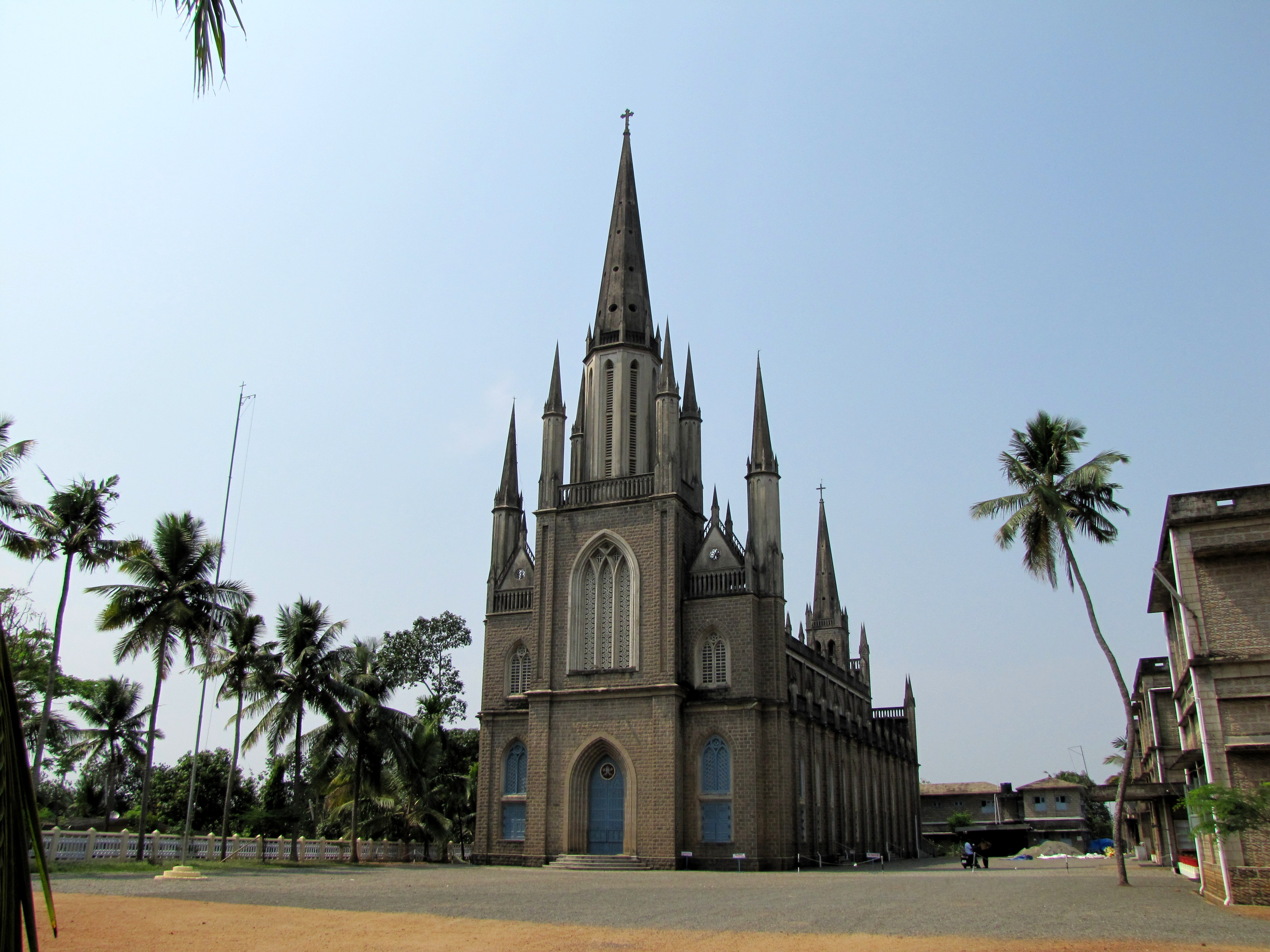
- Immaculate Heart of Mary Cathedral

Location
- Country: India
- Ecclesiastical province: Verapoly
- Metropolitan: Verapoly
- Coordinates: 9°35′31″N 76°32′0″E

Statistics
- Area: 9,000 km^{2} (3,500 sq mi)
- Population: Total; Catholics: (as of 2010); 3,864,879; 79,021 (2%)
- Parishes: 84

Information
- Rite: Roman Rite
- Established: 14 July 1930
- Cathedral: Immaculate Heart of Mary Cathedral in Kottayam
- Patron saint: Immaculate Heart of Mary

Current leadership
- Pope: Leo XIV
- Bishop: Sebastian Thekethecheril
- Metropolitan Archbishop: Joseph Kalathiparambil
- Auxiliary Bishops: Justin Alexander Madathiparambil

Website
- Website of the Diocese

The Roman Catholic Diocese of Vijayapuram (Latin: Viiayapuramen(sis)) is a diocese located in the city of Kottayam in the ecclesiastical province of Verapoly in India.

== History ==
The Diocese of Vijayapuram was established on 14 July 1930 from the Metropolitan Archdiocese of Verapoly.

== Leadership ==
- Bishops of Vijayapuram (Roman Rite)
  - Bishop Sebastian Thekethecheril (8 May 2006 – present)
  - Bishop Peter Thuruthikonam (5 May 1988 – 8 May 2006)
  - Bishop Cornelius Elanjikal (later Archbishop) (16 January 1971 – 26 January 1987)
  - Bishop John Ambrose Abasolo y Lecue, OCD (25 December 1949 – 16 January 1971)
  - Bishop Juan Vicente Arana Idígoras, OCD (24 March 1931 – 14 June 1946)

== History ==
With the bull Ad Christi Nomen, Pope Pius XI bifurcated the Archdiocese of Verapoly and erected the Diocese of Vijayapuram on 14 July 1930. The headquarters of the diocese is in Kottayam Municipal Town. As there is an Oriental Catholic Diocese named Kottayam since 1887, the formators decided to name the new diocese Vijayapuram, because it was the name of the Panchayath adjacent to Kottayam town and it was the centre of the Church activities of the Diocese. Vijayapuram is characterized by its multiple specialties. It comprises the entire civil districts of Kottayam, Idukki and partial portions of the districts of Alleppey, Pathanamthitta, and Ernakulam.

Many factors facilitated the formation of this diocese. The presence of Roman Catholics in this area is due to rapid migration from within and outside the state. The first phase of the migration started in the middle of the 18th century when Latin Catholics from the Diocese of Cochin came to Vaisiambhagom, Nedumudy, Kanjpadam and its vicinities. The second phase began at the first half of the 19th century, when people from different parishes of Quilon reached Maramon, Ranny, Vanavathukkara, Thiruvalla, Changanacherry and Poovam. The third phase started by the second half of the 19th century when the high ranges of the eastern side began to be used for cultivation tea. People from Verapoly, Cochin and from different parts of Tamil Nadu settled down in this area for different jobs. The arrival of Brother Rockey Palackal, OCD, at the end of the 19th century geared upon the fourth phase of the history of the Diocese of Vijayapuram. Brother Rockey, as a zealous father, worked hard in Kottayam, Thellakom, Chengalam and Kumarakom and preached the Good News to the native people. He opted to serve the poor, sidelined, marginalized and downtrodden and thus secured the name "Apostle of the Outcastes".

The area Church work of the Archdiocese of Verapoly entrusted to the Carmelites was created to be the Diocese of Vijayapuram. The administration was in the hands of the Carmelites of the Navara Province.

Languages spoken: Malayalam and Tamil Revenue districts: Kottayam, Idukki, Ernakulam, Alleppey, Pathanamthitta

=== Statistics ===
- Diocesan Clergy: 100
- Religious Priests: 39
- Religious Brothers: 14
- Religious Women: 429
- No. of Parishes: 73
- Houses of Women Religious: 58
- Houses of Men Religious: 16

=== Formation houses ===
- Minor Seminaries: 05

=== Educational institutions ===
- B.Ed. Colleges: 01
- Students: 120
- Colleges: 01
- Students: 123
- Technical Institutions: 01
- Students: 25
- Collegiates (P.U.C.): 01
- Students: 73
- Sr. Secondary Schools (10+2): 04
- Students: 1,206
- High Schools (10th std.): 14
- Students: 13,235
- Primary Schools: 39
- Students: 24,909
- Hospitals: 05
- Beds: 250
- Dispensaries: 06
- Beneficiaries (Annual): 80200
- Other Institutions: 39
- Beneficiaries (Annual): 2929
