= Immaculate Heart of Mary Cathedral, Kottayam =

Immaculate Heart of Mary Cathedral
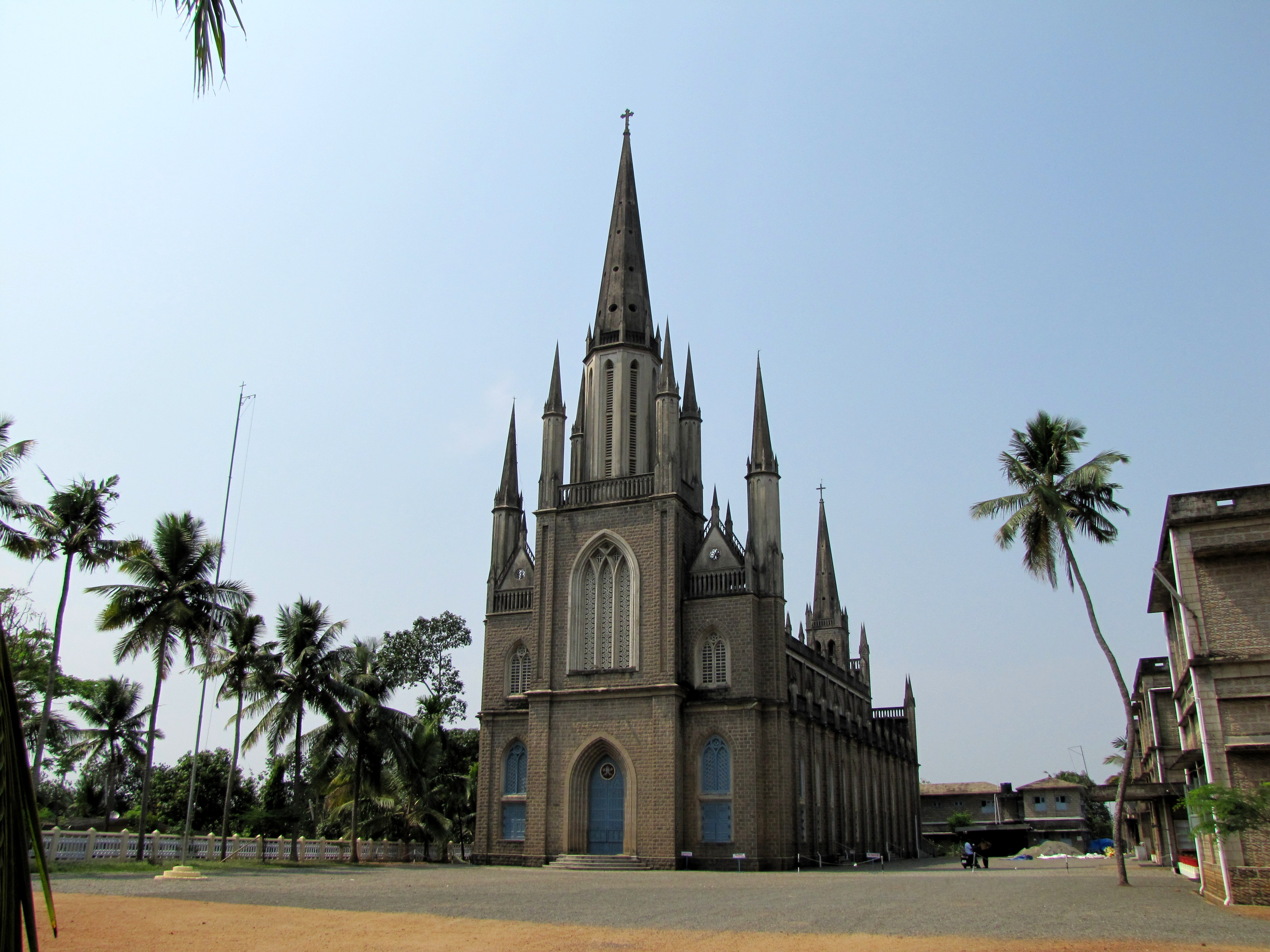
- Immaculate Heart of Mary Cathedral

- Location of the cathedral in Kerala
- 9.595688°N 76.537078°E
- Location: Kottayam
- Country: India
- Denomination: Roman Catholic
- Website: www.vijayapuramdiocese.org

History
- Status: Cathedral

Architecture
- Functional status: active
- Style: Gothic
- Groundbreaking: 1956
- Completed: 1964

Administration
- Province: Archdiocese of Verapoly
- Diocese: Diocese of Vijayapuram

Clergy
- Bishop: Sebastian Thekethecheril

The Immaculate Heart of Mary Cathedral, also known as the Vimalagiri Cathedral or as Angathattu Palli located at Kottayam is the cathedral of the Diocese of Vijayapuram. Built in the Gothic architectural style, the church has a 172-foot tall tower which is one of the tallest church towers in Kerala. The foundation stone of Vimalagiri Church was laid in the year 1956. The construction of the imposing edifice was finished in the year 1964. Its feast celebrated on 8 December every year, the feast of the Immaculate Heart of Mary.

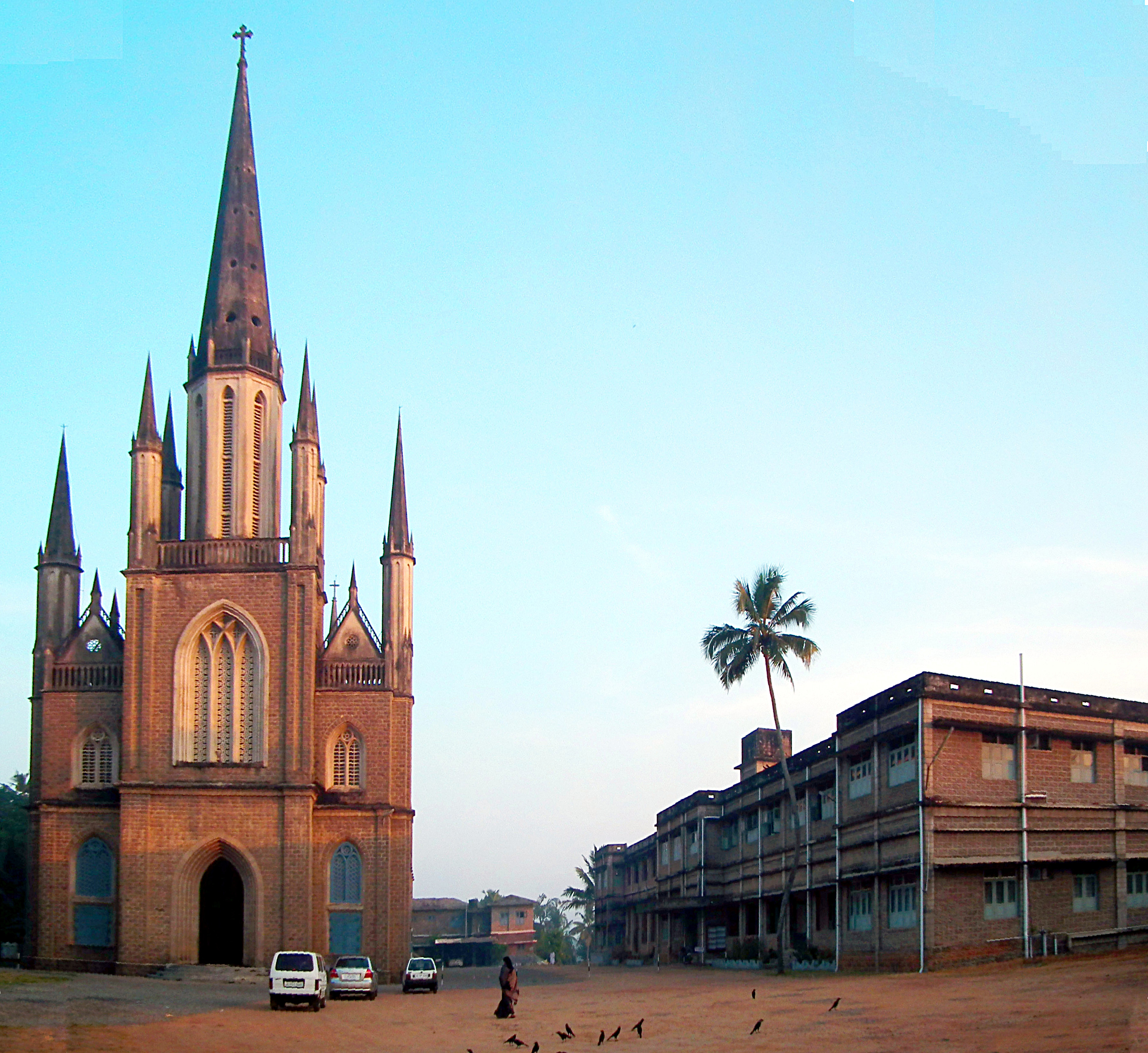
Vimalagiri Cathedral

== See also ==
- Catholic Church in India
