= Diocese of Kottapuram =

Roman Catholic diocese in Kerala, India

Coordinates: 10.2028°N 76.2048°E

Diocese of Kottapuram Dioecesis Kottapuramensis കോട്ടപ്പുറം രൂപത
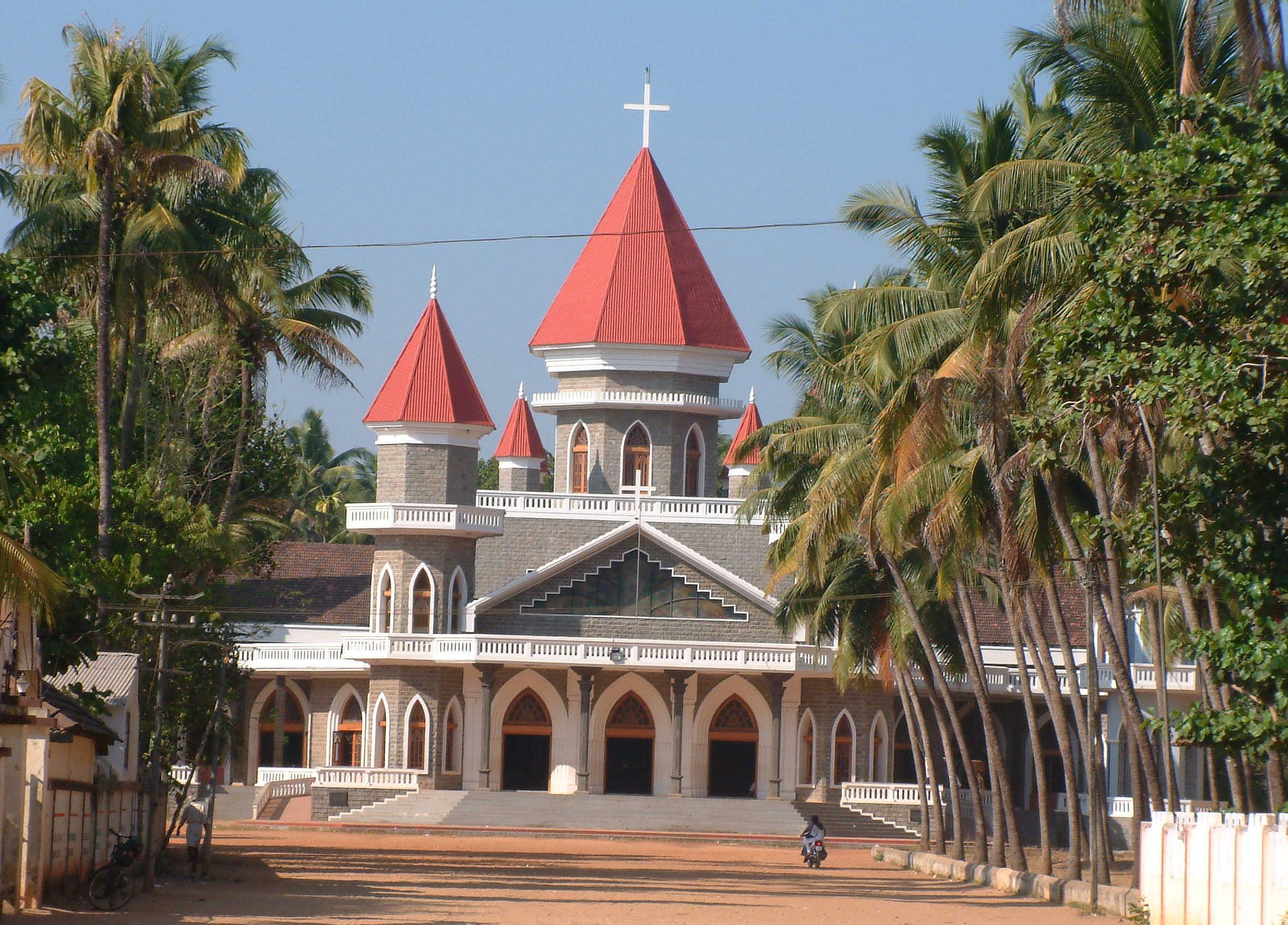
- Cathedral

Location
- Country: India
- Ecclesiastical province: Verapoly
- Metropolitan: Verapoly

Statistics
- Area: 3,000 km^{2} (1,200 sq mi)
- Population: Total; Catholics: (as of 2004); 3,201,098; 97000 (2.9%)
- Parishes: 50

Information
- Rite: Roman rite
- Established: 3 July 1987
- Cathedral: St Michael’s Cathedral in Kodungallur
- Patron saint: St Thomas

Current leadership
- Pope: Leo XIV
- Bishop: Ambrose Puthenveetil
- Metropolitan Archbishop: Joseph Kalathiparambil
- Vicar General: Msgr Rockey Roby Kalathil
- Bishops emeritus: Joseph Karikkassery

Website
- Website of the Diocese

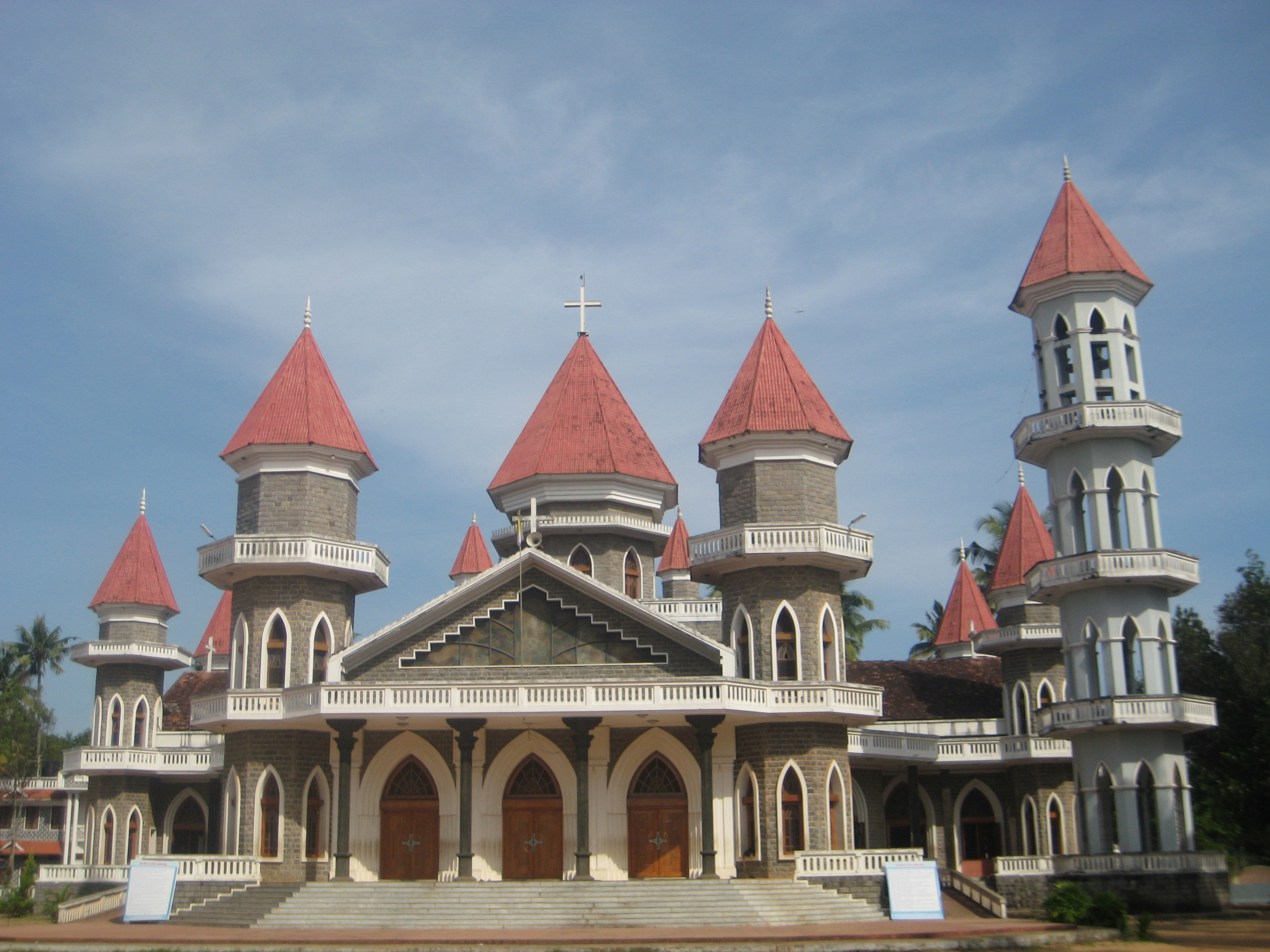
Cathedral

The Roman Catholic Diocese of Kottapuram (Latin: Kottapuramen(sis)) is a diocese located in the town of Kodungallur in the ecclesiastical province of Verapoly in India. On Saturday, 18 December 2010, Pope Benedict XVI named Joseph Karikkassery, Auxiliary Bishop of the Roman Catholic Archdiocese of Verapoly, as Bishop of Kottapuram. The diocese had until then been a vacant see (sede vacante), as Bishop Francis Kallarakal had been appointed by Pope Benedict XVI in February 2010 as Metropolitan Archbishop of the Roman Catholic Archdiocese of Verapoly, India (the Diocese of Kottapuram is in its Ecclesiastical Province).

== History ==
- 3 July 1987: Established as Diocese of Kottapuram from the Metropolitan Archdiocese of Verapoly

== Bishops ==
- Francis Kallarakal (4 October 1987 – 20 February 2010); appointed as Metropolitan Archbishop of the Roman Catholic Archdiocese of Verapoly
- Joseph Karikkassery (18 December 2010 – 1 May 2023); formerly had been Auxiliary Bishop of Verapoly; the son of Francis and Agnes. Late Rocky was his elder brother and Philomina, wife of Jerome, is his sister.
- Ambrose Puthenveetil Third Bishop Of The Diocese Consecrated On 20 January 2024.

== KLCA ==
Kerala Latin Catholic Association of Kottapuram

- First President - P.R. Lawrance, Gothuruth
- General Secretary - Babu Manjaly, Eriyad

== KCYM ==
Kerala Catholic Youth Movement

- First Committee
  - Joy Gothuruth - President
  - David Xavier, Koratty - Vice President
  - Benny Pullayil, Koottukad - Gen.Secretary
  - Jerson Chakkanat, Kottapuram - Secretary
  - Sebastian Konnully. Paravur - Treasurer
  - Micheal P. T., Kunjithai - Sports Forum
  - George Arakkathara, Madaplathuruth - Exe.member
  - Francis.E.D., Eriyad- Socio- Political Forum
  - Stanly Koodallur, Kottapuram - Exe. Comm.
  - Jessy.E.C, Gothuruth - Exe.
  - Joy Kaimathuruthy, Gothuruth - Education Forum
  - Shyja E. R., Kara - Arts Forum
  - Beena K. A., Kunjithai - Exe.
