= Alex Vadakumthala =

Indian bishop

His Excellency Alex Vadakumthala
- Bishop of Kannur
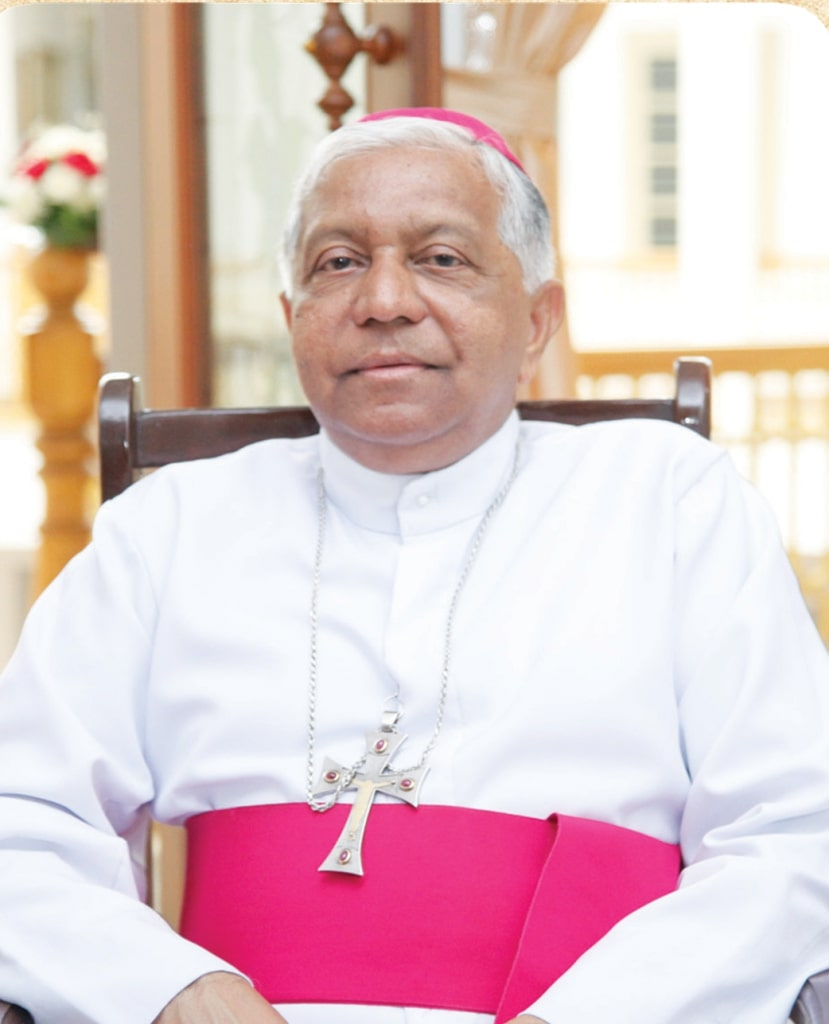
- Church: Roman Catholic Church
- See: Kannur Diocese
- Appointed: 1 February 2014
- In office: 2014–present
- Predecessor: Varghese Chakkalakal
- Previous post: Vicar General

Orders
- Ordination: 19 December 1984
- Consecration: 23 March 2014 by Salvatore Pennacchio

Personal details
- Born: 14 June 1959 (age 67) Panagad, Kerala, India

Bishop Dr. Alex Vadakumthala was ordained as Priest on 19 December 1984. He served as the Vicar General of the Archdiocese of Verapoly. He was appointed as Bishop of Kannur on 1 February 2014. He has served as the Executive Secretary of the CBCI Commission for Health Care. He had also served as the Project Director, Constant Lievens National Academy of Healy Sciences, Ranchi (CBCIs – Ambitious Medical College and Hospital Project for North India). Bishop Alex's artistic achievements are highlighted in the Malayalam Christian Devotional Song Divya sneham ദിവ്യ സ്നേഹം, where he contributed its lyrics.

== Brief Info ==
Born : 14 June 1959

Place : Panangad, Ernakulam

Diocese : Verapoly

Parish : St. Antony's Church, Panangad

Parents : Joseph Vadakumthala and Mary Joseph

Family : 4 sisters and 2 brothers

Primary Education : St. Antony's L.P School, Panangad

U.P & High School : Panangad High School

College Studies : St. Paul's College, Kalamassery

Joined the Seminary : 1974 St. Joseph's Seminary, Kalamassery

Seminary Studies : Papal Seminary and Jnana Deepa Vidyapeeth, Pune

Ordained Priest : 19 December 1984, St. Francis Assisi Cathedral

Worked in Parishes : St. Assisi Cathedral, Ernakulam, St. Philomena's, Koonammavu, Vimalambika

Master of Arts (Eng) : University of Kerala

Doctorate in Canon Law : Urban University, Rome

Professor : St. Joseph's Seminary, Carmelgiri

Pontifical Council for Health : Vatican, 1992–1993

Vice Chancellor of Curia : Verapoly 1993–1994

Cochin Arts and Communication : Director, Cochin 1994–1996

CBCI Health Commission : Executive Secretary 1999–2008

CBCI Medical College in Ranchi, Jharkhand : Project Director 2008–2011

Canon Law Society of India : President, 2007–2013

Vicar General : Verapoly 2011–2014 February

Ecclesiastical Adviser KLCA : 2011–2014

Elected Bishop : February 2014

Ordained Bishop : 23 March 2014
