= Roman Catholic Diocese of Kannur =

Latin Catholic diocese in Kerala, India

Diocese of Kannur Dioecesis Kannurensis കണ്ണൂർ രൂപത

catholic
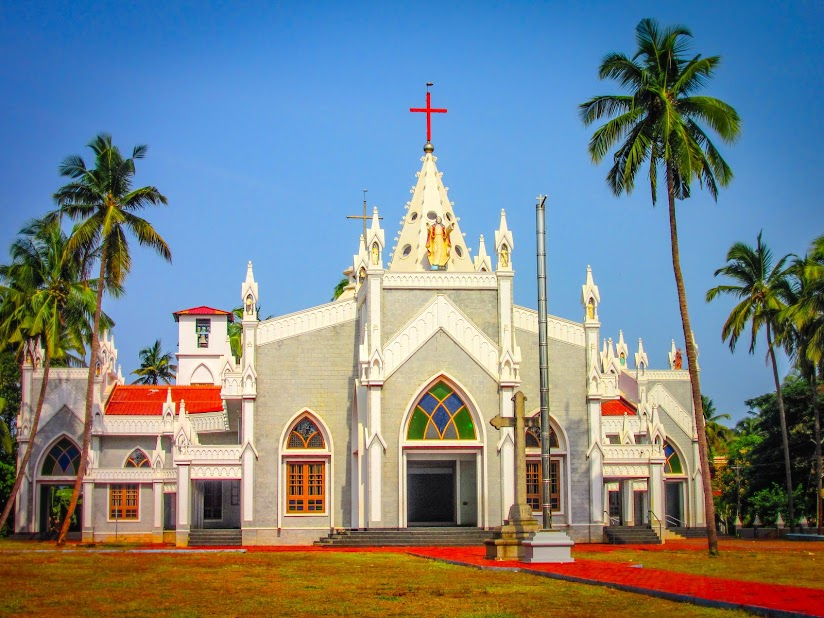
- Holy Trinity Cathedral, Kannur

Location
- Country: India
- Ecclesiastical province: Calicut
- Coordinates: 11.8592°N 75.3614°E

Statistics
- Area: 4,988 km^{2} (1,926 sq mi)
- Population: Total; Catholics: (as of 2011); 2,734,000; 48,899 (1.8%)

Information
- Denomination: Roman Catholic
- Sui iuris church: Latin Church
- Rite: Roman Rite
- Established: 5 November 1998
- Cathedral: Cathedral of the Holy Trinity in Kannur

Current leadership
- Pope: Leo XIV
- Bishop: Most Rev. Dr. Alex Vadakumthala
- Metropolitan Archbishop: Most Rev. Dr. Varghese Chakkalakal
- Auxiliary Bishops: Rt. Rev. Dr. Dennis Kuruppassery
- Vicar General: Mon. Devassy Earathara and Mon. Clarence Paliath

Website
- www.kannurdiocese.com

Pope John Paul II created the Diocese of Kannur in the Ecclesiastical Province of Kozhikode in India by bifurcating the Diocese of Calicut on 9 December 1998. The diocese consists of the Latin Catholics of Malabar residing in the revenue districts of Kannur and Kasaragod.

The see was vacant from 2012 until 2014. On 1 February 2014, Pope Francis appointed Alex Joseph Vadakumthala as the new bishop of Kannur. He was consecrated on 23 March.

Diocese of Kannur comprises the territory of the civil district of Kannur to the north of Mahé River, excluding Palloor, Chalakkara, Pandakkal and Cherukallai which belong to the municipality of Mahe and the territory of the civil district of Kasaragod which falls to the south of Chandragiri River. The erection of this diocese was a historical event for Kannur which has 500 years of Christian tradition. The establishment of this diocese, on the auspicious occasion of the Platinum Jubilee of the Diocese of Calicut was welcomed with cheer, by the people who consider the diocese of Kannur as a gift of God to this region of India.

== History ==
Although Christian communities existed in South and Central Kerala from the beginning of Christianity, North Kerala known as Malabar had to wait long for the advent of the European missionaries to start their evangelization until the 16th century. It was with the advent of the Portuguese sailor, Vasco de Gama who landed here on 20 May 1498, that the missionaries had access to this area. Fr. Pedro de Kovilaham, the first missionary who came to Malabar with Vasco de Gama died on 31 July 1498. As the Portuguese traders could not get along with the ruler of Calicut, "the Zamorin", they moved to Kannur and the "Kolathiri", king of Kannur welcomed them.

The four Franciscan missionaries with Hovavo Nova, their group leader were allowed to build a chapel in Kannur. (This is the place where the Holy Trinity Cathedral of the Diocese of Kannur is situated). In 1505, the Portuguese Viceroy, Francis de Almeida, established the famous fort of St. Angelos and built the church of St. James there.

- Visit of St. Francis Xavier :- The archives of the Society of Jesus in Rome testify that St. Francis Xavier, the patron of missions visited Kannur on 24 December 1542 and also on 7 November 1549.
- Expansion of Malabar Mission: - Several Portuguese colonies were formed in the 16th century along the coastal belt of the Arabian Sea. A church was built by Dominge Rodrigues in Tellicherry for the Christians there. When the British East India Company established the Tellicherry Fort in 1708, the Jesuit fathers renovated this church. Fr.Dominic OCD in 1736 established a church in Mahe to look after the spiritual needs of the French Catholics settled there. This church came to be known "the Shrine of Mahe", or the Shrine of St. Theresa of Avila. In 1807, St. Michael's School was established for the education of boys and in 1871 St. Teresa's School for girls in Kannur was started by the Apostolic Carmelites. In the 1920s Fr. Faustine Aranha, began his work among the 'Dalits' of the Kanhangad region.
- Diocese of Calicut: - In 1878 with the handing over of South Kanara and Malabar region to the Jesuits of the Venice Province, the mission involvement of the area took a new turn. On 12 June 1923 some parts of Malabar which belonged to the Diocese of Mangalore were separated and the new Diocese of Calicut was established. There were about 6000 Catholics and 16 Priests, spread out in Calicut, Tellicherry, Kannur, Vythiri, and Mananthavady. There were 50 sisters in three convents and 12 educational institutions. The Diocese of Calicut made strides in progress under its holy and able Prelates Paul Perini, Leo Proserpio, Aldo Maria Patroni and Maxwell Noronha. In 1998 the Catholics increased tenfold to about 60,000. There were 169 priests, 1174 sisters in 105 convents and 245 educational institutions.
- Chirakal Mission :- Under the patronage of Bishop Leo Proserpio, in 1937, Fr. Peter Caironi S.J started his mission among the natives. Marginalised community was given proper housing facilities, education and the possibility of a more human existence. Fathers John Sequeira, Joseph Taffrel S.J, James Monthanari S.J, Aloysius Del Zotto S.J, Michael Vendramin S.J had tried hard to evangelize this area. Fr. Linus Zucol S.J, who continues to work in this area has become a mission legend. These missionaries were supported by the Canossian sisters under mother Antoneitta Sala, the Deena Sevana Sabha founded by Mother Petra, the Ursulines and the others. Consequently, we have today about 35,501 Catholics spread over 51 parishes and 21 mission stations, in the two revenue districts of Kannur and Kasaragod.
- Diocese of Kannur :- The diocese of Calicut was spread out to an area of 13051 km^{2}. in six revenue districts. In the context of such an extensive area there was the need of a new diocese for the benefit of the faithful. Bishop Maxwell Noronha, in consultation with the priests, religious and the laity requested the Holy See to establish the new diocese of Kannur.

Pope John Paul II by the Apostolic Brief Ad Perpetuam Rei Memoriam, dated 5 November 1998, created the Diocese of Kannur from the Diocese of Calicut. On the same day Varghese Chakkalakal who was a professor at St.Joseph's Seminary, Mangalore, and a priest of the diocese of Calicut, was elected the Bishop of Kannur and the Bishop elect was consecrated on 7 February 1999 and he took charge of the diocese on 8 February 1999. The Bishop has taken as his motto "according to your will" "Daivathirumanassinu Vidheyathuvam". On Monday, 15 June 2012, Pope Benedict XVI transferred him to become Bishop of the Roman Catholic Diocese of Calicut, India; he will be the Apostolic Administrator of the Diocese during the sede vacante (vacant see) period until a successor is chosen by the Pope.

== Saints and causes for beatification ==
- Servant of God Maria Celine Kannanaikal, UMI
- Servant of God Paula Monnigmann (Petra) [Dinadassi]
- Servant of God Linus Maria Zucol
