= John Vincent (Carmelite) =

Venerable John Vincent of Jesus and Mary O.C.D.
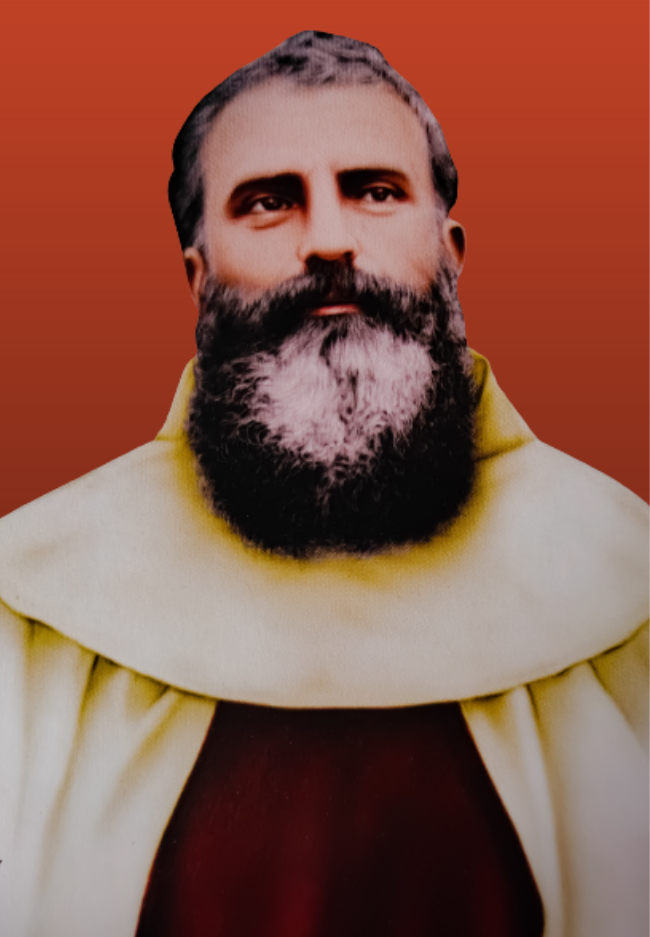

Friar
- Born: Juan Vicente Zengotita-Bengoa Lasuen; 19 July 1862; Berriz
- Died: 27 February 1943; San Sebastián
- Venerated in: Catholic church
- Feast: 27 February

John Vincent of Jesus and Mary (born Juan Vicente Zengotita-Bengoa Lasuen; 19 July 1862 – 27 February 1943) was a Spanish Carmelite priest, declared as venerable by the Catholic church. He was born in Berriz, Basque country on 19 July 1862. He entered the Order of Discalced Carmelites. He arrived in Bombay on 7 December 1900, and went to Goa to venerate the relics of St. Francis Xavier. He studied English and Malayalam. He also wrote a book about the local language. He served in the Verapoly Archdiocese in Kerala for 17 years. Fr. John Vincent returned to Spain in 1917. He died in 1943. The cause of his beatification was opened on 20 November 1950. John Paul II elevated him to the status of Venerable on January 12, 1996.
