= Sebastian Thekethecheril =

- Bishop of Vijayapuram
- Church: Roman Catholic Church
- Diocese: Diocese of Vijayapuram
- Appointed: 8 May 2006
- In office: 2006–present
- Predecessor: Peter Thuruthikonam
- Successor: incumbent
- Previous post: Priest

Orders
- Ordination: 18 December 1980
- Consecration: 2 July 2006 by Peter Thuruthikonam

Personal details
- Born: 30 July 1954 (age 71) India
- Motto: GLORIFY GOD

Sebastian Thekethecheril (born 30 July 1954) is an Indian prelate of the Roman Catholic Church.

Thekethecheril was ordained a priest on 18 December 1980. He was appointed to the Diocese of Vijayapuram and was ordained a bishop on 2 July 2006.
