= Cornelius Elanjikal =

Indian prelate of the Roman Catholic Church

- Archbishop of Diocese of Verapoly (Emeritus)
- Church: Roman Catholic Church
- Archdiocese: Diocese of Verapoly
- See: Diocese of Verapoly
- In office: 1987–1996
- Predecessor: Joseph Kelanthara
- Successor: Daniel Acharuparambil

Orders
- Ordination: 18 March 1945

Personal details
- Born: 8 September 1918 Kerala, India
- Died: 7 August 2011 (aged 92) Kochi, India

Cornelius Elanjikal D.D. Ph.D. DC.L. (8 September 1918 – 7 August 2011) was an Indian prelate of the Roman Catholic Church.

== Life Sketch ==
He was born in Elanjikal family in Kara, a small hamlet near Kodungallur, Thrissur District, Kerala, India on 8 September 1987 to Kunjavira and Thressia.

He had his early schooling in Mount Carmel School and St Albert's High School, Ernakulam. He completed his pastoral studies at St. Joseph's Pontifical Seminary, Mangalappuzha and obtained his Ph.D. in Hindu Theology on the subject Transformation in dependence of God with special reference to Brihadaranyaka and Chandokya Upanishads and Doctorate in Canon Law from Propaganda College, Rome.

He was ordained a priest on 18 March 1945. Elanjikal was appointed on 16 January 1971 to the Diocese of Vijayapuram and was consecrated bishop on 4 April 1971. Elanjikal was appointed to the Diocese of Verapoly on 26 January 1987. He also served as the President of Kerala Catholic Bishops' Council (KCBC). He retired from active service on 14 June 1996.

Bishop Elanjikal was a prolific writer who had 10 books and more than 500 Christian devotional songs to his credit. He was also known to be well-versed in Hindu Theology and Vedas. His most famous book was Concept of God in Upanishads. He was known to be actively involved in social activities and initiated several welfare programs for the Dalits and the poor living in the coastal areas of central Kerala. He has portrayed his life in his autobiography, Mangaatha Smaranakal (Unfading Memories)

He died on 7 October 2011, aged 93, at a private hospital in Ernakulam succumbing to respiratory ailments.
