= St George church, Vypin =

Roman Catholic church in Kerala, India

St. George Church Wadel is a Church in Vypin, Ernakulam District, Kerala, India. Built in 1849, the church has the highest number of priests and nuns in the Roman Catholic Archdiocese of Verapoly.

== See also ==
- Roman Catholic Archdiocese of Verapoly
