= Archdiocese of Calicut =

Catholic archdiocese in Kerala, India

Coordinates: 11.2530°N 75.7741°E

Archdiocese of Calicut Archdioecesis Calicutensis കോഴിക്കോട് ലത്തീൻ അതിരൂപത
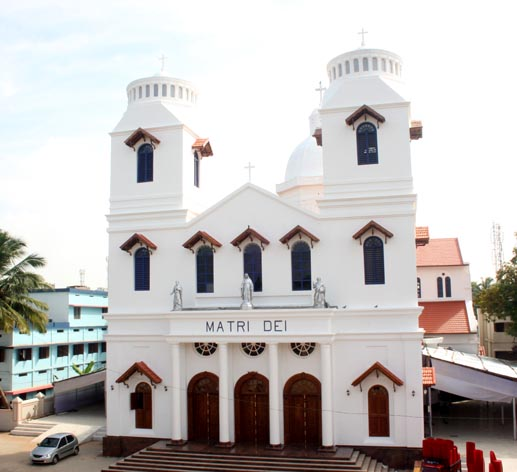
- Mother of God Cathedral, Calicut

Location
- Country: India

Statistics
- Area: 12,505 km^{2} (4,828 sq mi)
- Population: Total; Catholics: (as of 2006); 10,061,127; 38,092 (0.4%)
- Parishes: 41

Information
- Denomination: Catholic Church
- Sui iuris church: Latin Church
- Rite: Roman Rite
- Cathedral: Mother of God Cathedral in Kozhikode
- Patron saint: St Francis Xavier

Current leadership
- Pope: Leo XIV
- Metropolitan Archbishop: Varghese Chakkalakal
- Vicar General: Jenson Puthenveettil

Website
- Website of the Diocese

The Archdiocese of Calicut (Latin: Archdioecesis Calicuten(sis)) is a Latin Church ecclesiastical province or metropolitan archdiocese in India. It depends on the missionary Roman Congregation for the Evangelization of Peoples. Its suffragan dioceses are the Kannur and Sulthanpet.

Its cathedral is Mother of God Cathedral, dedicated to Our Lady, in the episcopal see of Kozhikode (Calicut).

== Statistics ==
As of 2015, it pastorally served 48,250 Catholics (0.6% of 8,059,057 total population) on 8,036 km² in 41 parishes and 3 missions with 132 priests (57 diocesan, 75 religious), 837 lay religious (127 brothers, 710 sisters) and 12 seminarians.

== History ==
- 12 June 1923: Established as Diocese of Calicut on territories split off from the Roman Catholic Diocese of Coimbatore, Diocese of Mangalore and Diocese of Mysore
- On 1949 it gained territory from Metropolitan Archdiocese of Pondicherry
- Lost territories repeatedly: on 31 December 1953 to establish Diocese of Tellicherry, on 1998.11.05 to establish Diocese of Kannur, on 28 December 2013 to establish Diocese of Sultanpet.
- On 12 April 2025, the Diocese of Calicut was elevated to the status of an archdiocese by Pope Francis. Bishop Varghese Chakkalakal, who had been serving as the diocesan bishop, was appointed as the first Metropolitan Archbishop of the newly formed Archdiocese.

== Ordinaries ==
=== Bishops ===
- Paul Carlo Perini (1923 – 1932)
- Leone Proserpio (1932 – 1948)
- Aldo Maria Patroni (1948 – 1980)
- Maxwell Valentine Noronha (1980 – 2002)
- Joseph Kalathiparambil (2002 – 2011)
- Varghese Chakkalakal (2011 – 2025)

=== Metropolitan Archbishops ===
- Varghese Chakkalakal (2025 – present)

== Sources and External links ==
- GCatholic, with Google satellite HQ picture - data for all sections ^{[self-published]}
- diocesan website
- Catholic Hierarchy ^{[self-published]}
