= Daniel Acharuparambil =

Latin Catholic Indian archbishop

- Archbishop of Diocese of Verapoly
- Church: Catholic Church
- See: Diocese of Verapoly
- In office: 1996–2009
- Predecessor: Cornelius Elanjikal
- Successor: Dr. Francis Kallarakal

Orders
- Ordination: 14 March 1966

Personal details
- Born: 12 May 1939 Kerala, India
- Died: 26 October 2009 (aged 70) Kerala, India

Daniel Acharuparambil (12 May 1939 – 26 October 2009) was a Latin Catholic Indian Archbishop of Verapoly in Kerala. Ordained to the priesthood on 14 March 1966, he was named archbishop and was consecrated on 3 November 1996.

== Early life and education ==
Daniel Acharuparambil, the archbishop of Verapoly, was a member of Discalced Carmelite Order, Manjummel Province, Kerala, India. He was born to Rocky and Monica Acharuparambil in Palliport, Kerala, India, on 12 May 1939.

After his school-leaving examination, he joined the Carmelite order at Ernakulam in May 1956. He completed his philosophy and theology courses at St. Joseph's Pontifical Seminary, Alwaye. He was ordained as a priest on 14 March 1966. He acquired a bachelor's degree in economics, licentiate in philosophy and a master's degree in Indian philosophy from the University of Kerala, Pontifical Athenaeum in Poona and Banaras Hindu University in Varanasi, respectively.

== Career ==
In 1972, he started teaching at Pontifical Urbaniana University (P.U.U), Rome. In 1978 Acharuparambil was awarded a Ph.D. from the Pontifical University of St. Thomas Aquinas, Angelicum, Rome with a dissertation entitled The destiny of man in the evolutionary thought of Sri Aurobindo.

In 1986, he became dean of the Faculty of Missiology at P.U.U; he also served as rector there from 1988 to 1994, i.e. for two terms. He was consulter of the Pontifical Council for Inter-religious Dialogue for 5 years from 1990. He was also consulter of the Congregation for Evangelization of the Peoples, a member of the Pontifical Council for Inter-religious Duologue.

He was nominated archbishop on 5 August 1996 and was consecrated at Ernakulam on 3 November 1996 by Josef Cardinal Tomko, Prefect of the Congregation for the Evangelization of Peoples, Rome. The same day he received the pallium. He was the president of Kerala Regional Latin Catholic Council, president of Metropolitan Archbishop, president of K. C. B. C, chairman of Kerala Catholic Bishops Council, president of Kerala Catholic Bishops Council and Archbishop of Verapoly.

He wrote several books on Hindu philosophy and religion.

He died at Lourdes Hospital in Kochi. His funeral was held at St Francis Assisi Cathedral in Ernakulam.

== Significant dates in his life ==
- 12 May 1939 – Born at Palliport
- 14 Mar 1966 – Ordained Priest – Priest of Order of Discalced Carmelites
- 14 Jun 1996 – Appointed Archbishop of Verapoly, India
- 3 Nov 1996 – Consecrated Bishop – Archbishop of Verapoly, India
- 24 Oct 2008 – Appointed Apostolic Administrator of Cochin, India
- 8 May 2009 – Resigned Apostolic Administrator of Cochin, India
- 26 October 2009 - Died in Kochi

=== Teaching responsibilities ===
- 1972 - 1996 Pontificia Universita Urbaniana
- 1 March 1994 Ordinary Professor
- 13 May 1981 Extraordinary Professor
- 1973 – 1983 Pontificia Universita Lateranense
- 1976 Pontificia Facolta Teologica, "Teresianum"
- 1980 Visiting Professor, Teresian Institute of Spirituality, Kalamasery
- 1977 Instituto Studi Asiatici, of P.I.M.E. Fathers Milano;
- 1977 Seminario Vescovile di Padova; Intensive course on Hinduism

=== Other higher responsibilities ===
- 1986 – 1988 Dean of the Faculty of Missiology, P.U.U.
- 1988 – 1991 Rettore Magnifico of P.U.U.
- 1990 – 1995 Consultor of the Pontificial Council – for Inter-religious Dialogue
- 1991 – 1996 Consultor of the Congregation – for Evangelization of Peoples
- 1996 – Pontifical Council for Inter-religious Dialogue

== See also ==
- Roman Catholic Archdiocese of Verapoly
