= Kottayam =

- City
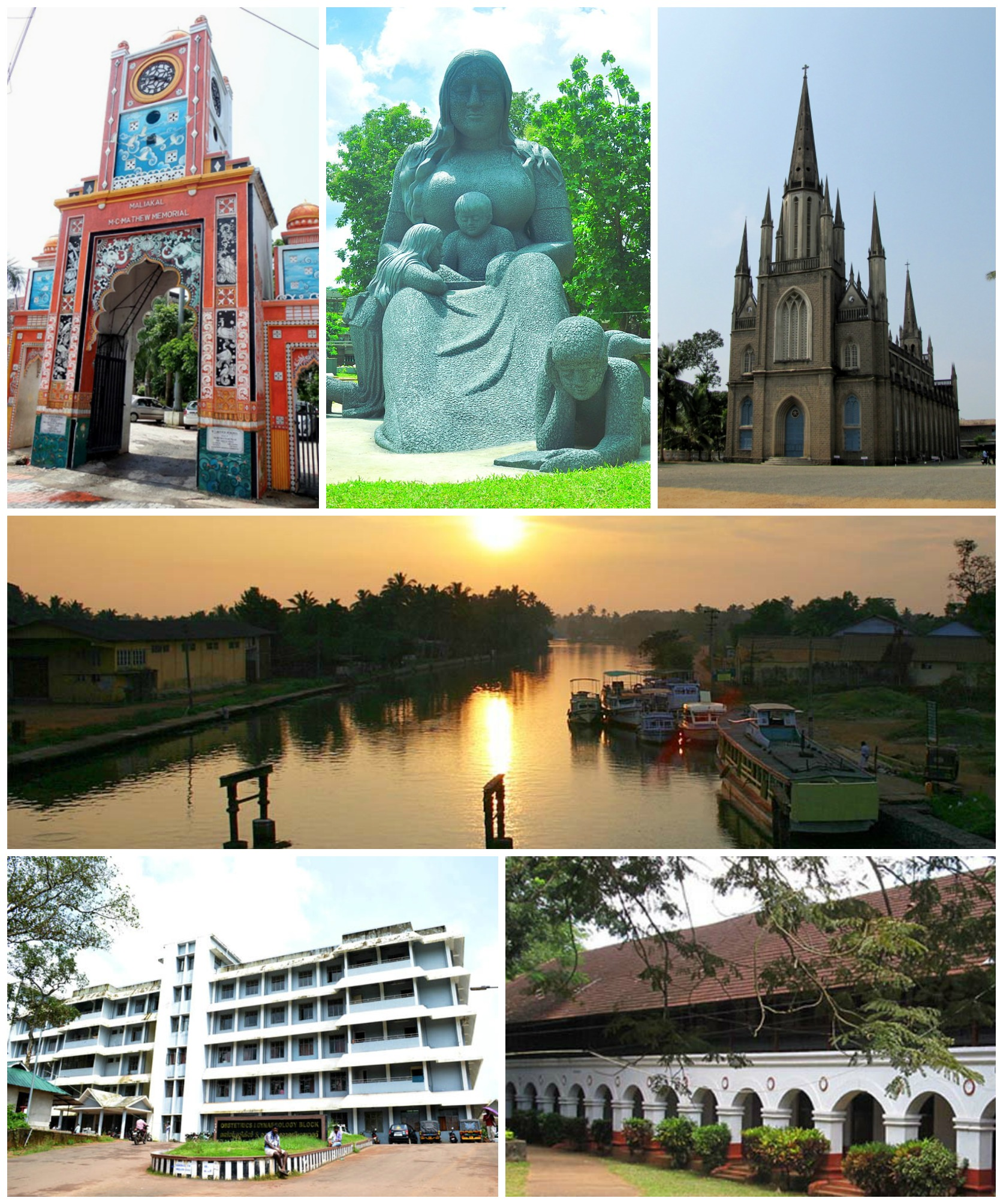
- Top to bottom, left to right: MC Mathew memorial at Thirunakkara, Aksharashilpam, Immaculate Heart of Mary Cathedral, Kodimatha Boat Jetty, Kottayam Government Medical College, CMS College Kottayam

- Kottayam (Kerala) Kottayam (India)
- Coordinates: 9°35′29.8″N 76°31′19.9″E
- Country: India
- State: Kerala
- District: Kottayam
- Municipality: 1921

Government
  - Type: Municipal council
  - Body: Kottayam Municipality
  - Municipal Chairperson: Bincy Sebastian

Area
  - City: 55.5 km^{2} (21.4 sq mi)
  - Metro: 186.65 km^{2} (72.07 sq mi)
- Elevation: 47.96 m (157.3 ft)

Population (2011)
  - City: 136,812
  - Rank: 8th in Kerala
  - Density: 2,470/km^{2} (6,380/sq mi)
  - Metro: 357,302
  - Metro density: 1,914.3/km^{2} (4,958.0/sq mi)
- Demonym: Kottayamkar

Languages
  - Official: Malayalam, English
- Time zone: UTC+5:30 (IST)
- PIN: 686001
- Telephone code: +91 481-XXXXXXX
- Vehicle registration: KL-05
- Sex ratio: 1075 female(s)/1000 male(s)/ ♂/♀
- Literacy rate: ▲99.66% Top
- HDI: ▲0.831 Very High
- Website: www.kottayammunicipality.lsgkerala.gov.in kottayam.nic.in

Kottayam (IPA: [ko:ʈ:ajam]) is a city in the Kottayam district of Kerala, India. It is the headquarters of Kottayam district, located about 66 km (41 mi) south of the commercial city of Kochi and 154 km (95.7 mi) north of the state capital Thiruvananthapuram. As per the 2011 census of India, Kottayam has a population of 136,812 people, and a population density of 2,470/km^{2} (6,400/sq mi). Kottayam is also referred to as "the City of Letters" as many of the first Malayalam daily newspapers, such as Deepika, Malayala Manorama, and Mangalam, were started and are headquartered in Kottayam, as are a number of publishing houses.

== Etymology ==
The royal palace of the Thekkumkur ruler was protected by a fort called Thaliyilkotta. It is believed that the name Kottayam is derived from a combination of the Malayalam words kotta which means fort (Thaliyilkotta) and akam which means inside. The combined form, Kottaykkakam (കോട്ടയ്ക്കകം), can be translated as "inside the fort".

== History ==
=== Thekkumkur rule (1103 - 1753) ===
From the beginning of the ninth century AD, the history of Thekkumkur and of Kottayam are virtually indistinguishable. Kottayam was then a part of Vempolinad, an area in the Kulashekara Empire (800 AD – 1103 AD). By 1103, the Kingdom of Vempolinad had split into the Kingdoms of Thekkumkur and Vadakkumkur, and the latter became a vassal of Cochin.

The royal house had originally been situated in Vennimala in Kottayam. It was protected by a fort known as Thaliyilkotta, and as a result, the locality came to be known by the same name as the fort. Afterward, the Thekkumkur kings shifted their capital to Nattassery near Kumaranallore, at the outskirts of Kottayam town. It is believed that the Thekkumkur dynasty ruled Kottayam from Thazhathangadi.

The Portuguese and the Dutch established trade relations with both of these kingdoms, dealing in black pepper and other spices. After the subjugation of the Dutch East India Company by the Kingdom of Travancore in the 1741 Travancore–Dutch War, military operations of Marthanda Varma progressed against the northern neighboring kingdoms, including Thekkumkur.

=== Travancore rule (1753 - 1949) ===
Though Thekkumkur allied with Chempakassery and Vadakkumkoor to protect the kingdom, all of them were finally annexed to Travancore. Another source states that the ruler of Thekkumkur had sided first with the Kingdom of Kayamkulam and then with the principality of Ambalapuzha against Travancore. After the fall of Ambalapuzha, and as the ruler of Thekkumkur refused to come to terms with Travancore, his capital city was taken on 11 September 1750 by Ramayyan Dalawa, the general and prime minister of Marthanda Varma, and the state was annexed to Travancore in 1753.

By the early 19th century, Travancore became a Protectorate of Britain after a series of unfair treaties. In 1817, the Church Missionary Society established CMS College as the first Western-style college in Kerala. It was welcomed by the Travancore government to provide administrators for the public bureaucracy.

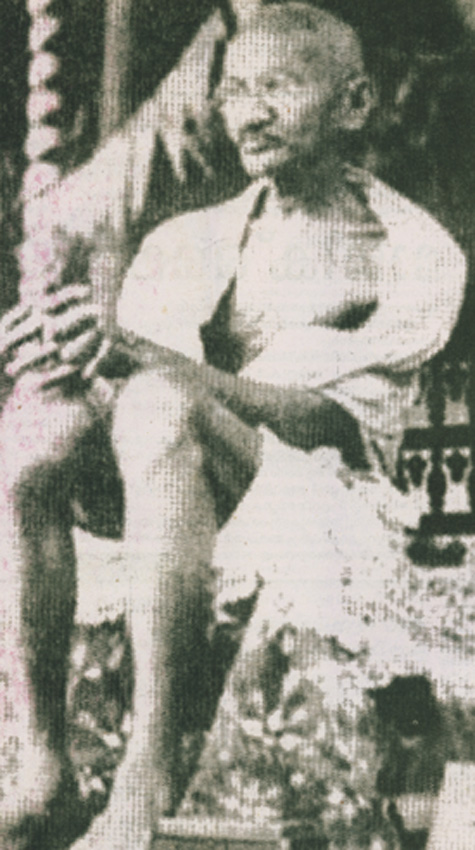
Mahatma Gandhi at Vaikom Satyagraha

=== Contemporary period (1949 - Present) ===
Kottayam became a revenue division of Travancore. A fifth division, Devikulam, existed for a short period but was later added to Kottayam. Kottayam district established in July 1949.

== Geography ==
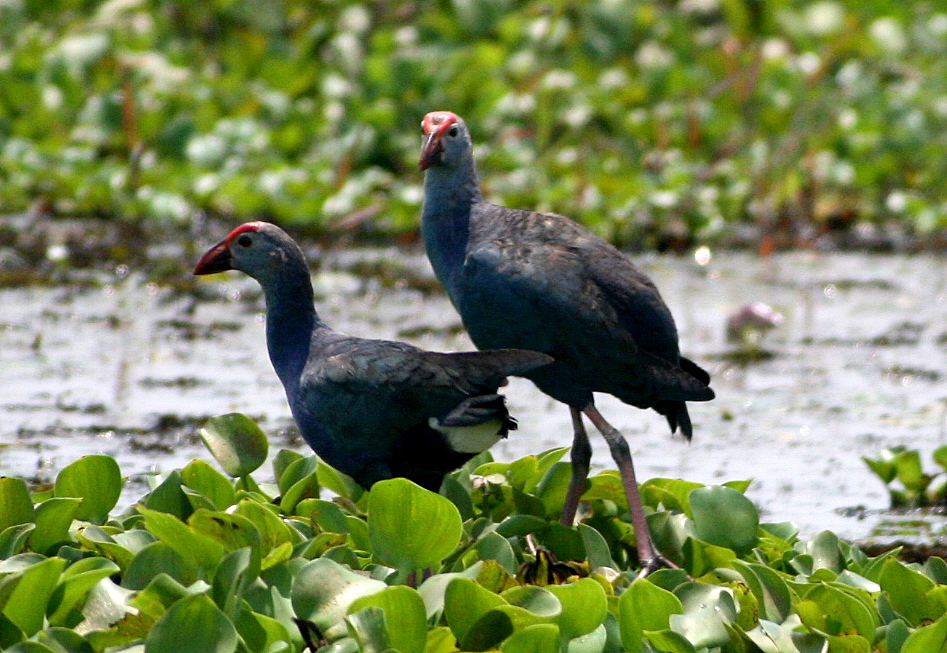
Purple Swamphen (Porphyrio porphyrio) photographed in Vembanad Lake, Kottayam

Kottayam has an average elevation of 3 metres (9.8 ft) above sea level. It is situated in the basin of the Meenachil River and in the basin of the Vembanad backwaters, which are formed from several streams in the Western Ghats of the Idukki district. The town is situated near the inland estuary of Meenachil river where it empties into the Vembanad lake in Kumarakom.

According to the division of places in Kerala based on altitudes, Kottayam is classified as a midland area. The general soil type is alluvial soil. The vegetation is mainly tropical evergreen and moist deciduous. The district features a mix of hills, back waters and paddy fields.

The area under Kottayam Municipality is 55.40 square kilometers. Kottayam town, the headquarters of Kottayam district is situated in the central part of Kerala, in the Central Travancore region. It is situated in between 9°29' 46" N and 9º 37' 59" North latitude and 76°29' 22" E and 76°34' 24" East longitudes.

=== Climate ===
Under the Köppen climate classification, Kottayam has a Tropical monsoon climate (Am).

The climate in this district is moderate and pleasant. Kottayam's proximity to the equator results in little seasonal temperature variation, with moderate to high levels of humidity year-round.

Kottayam district is bordered by Pathanamthitta district on the south, Alappuzha district on the west, Ernakulam district on the north and Idukki district on the east and northeast.

Climate data for Kottayam (1991–2020, extremes 1970–present)
| Month | Jan | Feb | Mar | Apr | May | Jun | Jul | Aug | Sep | Oct | Nov | Dec | Year |
|---|---|---|---|---|---|---|---|---|---|---|---|---|---|
| Record high °C (°F) | 37.0 (98.6) | 38.6 (101.5) | 38.6 (101.5) | 38.3 (100.9) | 37.2 (99.0) | 35.9 (96.6) | 34.7 (94.5) | 35.5 (95.9) | 35.0 (95.0) | 35.0 (95.0) | 36.0 (96.8) | 35.6 (96.1) | 38.5 (101.3) |
| Mean daily maximum °C (°F) | 32.9 (91.2) | 33.6 (92.5) | 34.4 (93.9) | 34.0 (93.2) | 33.0 (91.4) | 30.3 (86.5) | 29.6 (85.3) | 30.1 (86.2) | 30.9 (87.6) | 31.2 (88.2) | 31.5 (88.7) | 32.4 (90.3) | 32.0 (89.6) |
| Mean daily minimum °C (°F) | 22.2 (72.0) | 22.8 (73.0) | 23.8 (74.8) | 24.2 (75.6) | 24.0 (75.2) | 22.9 (73.2) | 22.7 (72.9) | 22.9 (73.2) | 23.2 (73.8) | 23.1 (73.6) | 23.1 (73.6) | 22.4 (72.3) | 23.1 (73.6) |
| Record low °C (°F) | 16.0 (60.8) | 16.0 (60.8) | 18.5 (65.3) | 20.2 (68.4) | 16.9 (62.4) | 18.0 (64.4) | 18.1 (64.6) | 16.9 (62.4) | 20.2 (68.4) | 19.2 (66.6) | 18.1 (64.6) | 16.0 (60.8) | 16.0 (60.8) |
| Average rainfall mm (inches) | 8.1 (0.32) | 18.7 (0.74) | 66.4 (2.61) | 151.3 (5.96) | 257.2 (10.13) | 585.9 (23.07) | 534.0 (21.02) | 406.6 (16.01) | 275.6 (10.85) | 362.2 (14.26) | 182.1 (7.17) | 45.5 (1.79) | 2,893.8 (113.93) |
| Average rainy days | 0.7 | 1.4 | 3.5 | 8.7 | 10.6 | 21.2 | 22.6 | 17.5 | 13.6 | 14.9 | 9.3 | 2.6 | 126.6 |
| Average relative humidity (%) (at 17:30 IST) | 60 | 59 | 61 | 68 | 71 | 79 | 80 | 78 | 76 | 76 | 75 | 66 | 71 |
Source: India Meteorological Department

Agriculture

Kottayam district is a significant center for natural rubber cultivation in Kerala. The headquarters of the Rubber Board (a statutory body under the Government of India) is located in Kottayam, which plays a key role in the development of the rubber industry.

Rubber is the dominant cash crop, with the district contributing substantially to Kerala's production (Kerala accounts for the majority of India's natural rubber output). In addition to rubber, secondary crops include coconut, banana, pineapple, pepper, and various spices. Intercropping in rubber plantations with vegetables and other short-term crops is encouraged for additional income.

== Demographics ==
Historical population
| Year | Pop. | ±% |
|---|---|---|
| 1901 | 17,552 | — |
| 1911 | 15,141 | −13.7% |
| 1921 | 18,833 | +24.4% |
| 1931 | 25,236 | +34.0% |
| 1941 | 33,364 | +32.2% |
| 1951 | 44,204 | +32.5% |
| 1961 | 52,685 | +19.2% |
| 1971 | 59,714 | +13.3% |
| 1981 | 64,431 | +7.9% |
| 1991 | 89,625 | +39.1% |
| 2001 | 129,894 | +44.9% |
| 2011 | 172,878 | +33.1% |

As of 2001 India census, Kottayam Urban Agglomeration had a population of 172,878, while Kottayam district had a population of 1,974,551. The population of Kottayam municipality was 136,812. Males constituted 62% of the population and females 38%. Population growth in the district had a diminishing trend with a decadal population growth rate of 6.5% compared to 9.35% across the decade 1991–2000. Population growth in the municipality is due to migration for employment. Kottayam District is ranked first in literacy, with 95.9% literacy compared to 90.92% for Kerala State and 65.38% for India (2001 census).

Religions in Kottayam (2011)
| Hindu | 49.81% |
| Christians | 43.48% |
| Muslims | 6.41% |
| Buddhist | 0.02% |
| Jains | 0.00% |
| Sikhs | 0.01% |
| Others | 0.03% |
| Not available | 0.23% |
Distribution of religions

Scheduled Castes and Scheduled Tribes constituted 6.73% and 0.31% of the total population in Kottayam respectively.

== Literature ==
Jnananikshepam was the first newspaper published by the natives of Kerala, published at CMS press at Kottayam in 1848. Kottayam has produced many well-known writers, journalists and artists. Novelist Muttathu Varkey and poet Pala Narayanan Nair both have roots in Kottayam. Kottayam Pushpanath, a writer of crime thrillers lived in Kottayam. He died due to age related ailments on 2 May 2018. The Indian-English novelist Arundhati Roy is a native of Kottayam and her semi-autobiographical Booker Prize-winning novel, The God of Small Things, contains her childhood experiences in Aymanam, Kottayam. Unni R. a story writer and scriptwriter, is also from Kottayam. Kottayam was the first town in India to have achieved 100% literacy. Kottayam Public Library was founded in 1882 by T Rama RaoDewanPeshkar (Collector) of Northern Division of Travancore State.

== Education ==
In the 17th century, a Dutch school was started at Kottayam, which was short-lived. The first English school in Kerala, and the first college in India, was established in 1817 by the Church Missionary Society of England under the leadership of Col. John Munro, as CMS College. Today CMS College Kottayam and SB College, established with help of Syro Malabar Catholic Church, in Changanassery, 17 km from town, stands as a landmark and has made a huge contribution to education in the district. Thus, Kottayam became India's first town with 100% literacy in 1989.

The Government Medical College, Kottayam, is one of the most prominent medical colleges in Kerala. Also, Mahatma Gandhi University, Kerala, is based out of Kottayam. Kottayam boasts several other colleges and universities. It is also home to one of the world's most renowned institutes for Syriac studies: St. Ephrem Ecumenical Research Institute.

There are 14 engineering colleges. Government Engineering College - Rajiv Gandhi Institute of Technology, Kottayam is located in Pampady, 14 km east of Kottayam. Indian institute of information technology, Kottayam, an institute of national importance is also located around 30 km (19 mi) from Kottayam, near to Pala town. Indian Institute of Mass Communication (IIMC) has one of its regional centres near Pampady, Kottayam.

== Media ==
In 1821, Benjamin Bailey, a British missionary, established C.M.S. Press, the first printing press in Kerala, in Kottayam. The town has been at the forefront of newspaper and book publishing in the state ever since.

Newspaper Malayala Manorama, published from Kottayam, is one of the largest circulating dailies in India. The Malayala Manorama Group, based in Kottayam, also owns Manorama Online, Manorama News Channel, The Week magazine and other publications. Other major Malayalam newspapers—Mathrubhoomi, Deshabhimani, Deepika, Madhyamam, and around thirty periodicals are published from Kottayam. Kottayam is also home to several Malayalam book publishers such as D. C. Books, Labour India Publications and Current Books. Almost 70 percent of books published in Kerala are from Kottayam. In 1945, a group of writers set up Sahithya Pravarthaka Sahakarana Sangham (English: Literary Workers' Co-operative Society) in Malayalam.

=== Sports ===
A number of annual basketball tournaments, including the Marian Trophy, Girideepam Trophy, Lourdes Trophy, and Virginia Memorial Tournament, are conducted in Kottayam. The main sports stadiums in Kottayam are Nehru Stadium and Rajiv Gandhi Indoor Stadium, both located in Nagambadom. Native Ball (നാടൻ പന്തുകളി) is also a well-known traditional sport in the region.

== Governance ==
The taluks in Kottayam district are:

- Changanacherry
- Kanjirappally
- Kottayam
- Meenachil
- Vaikom

=== Legislature ===
Kottayam is one of the six municipalities in the district, formed after the implementation of the Kerala Municipalities Act in 1994. The members of the municipal council are elected from each of the 52 wards every five years, coinciding with the local government elections across the state. The chairperson is the executive authority of the municipality.

Kottayam city is the part of the Kottayam legislative assembly constituency and the Kottayam Lok Sabha constituency. The legislative assembly election is conducted every four years, last in May 2016.

=== Executive ===
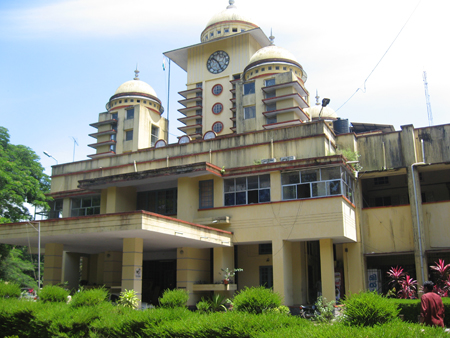
Kottayam Collectorate

The collectorate of the Kottayam District is located in Kottayam city. The present collector is Sri. Chetan Kumar Meena IAS. Shri.S.Sreejith IAS serves as Additional District Magistrate and Deputy Collector (General) of Kottayam District.

Many administrative and district offices of Kottayam including the District Court is situated within the collectorate premises.

=== Judiciary ===
Five courts were established during the tenure of Colonel John Munro, as the Diwan of various states in India. One of these was established in Vaikom, in the northwest of Kottayam district.

The district court at Kottayam was established in 1910 during the period of Sree Moolam Thirunal Maharaja of Travancore. The court celebrated its centenary in 2010.

The District Headquarters of the judiciary is set up at Kottayam city with the Principal District Court as its administrative centre. The justice delivery system consists of eight Munsiff Courts, ten Judicial First Class Magistrate Courts, three Sub Courts, one Chief Judicial Magistrate Court, and three Additional District Courts. In addition to these regular courts, two Motor Accidents Claims Tribunals, one special court for Vigilance cases, and two Family Courts also function in the district.

== Politics ==
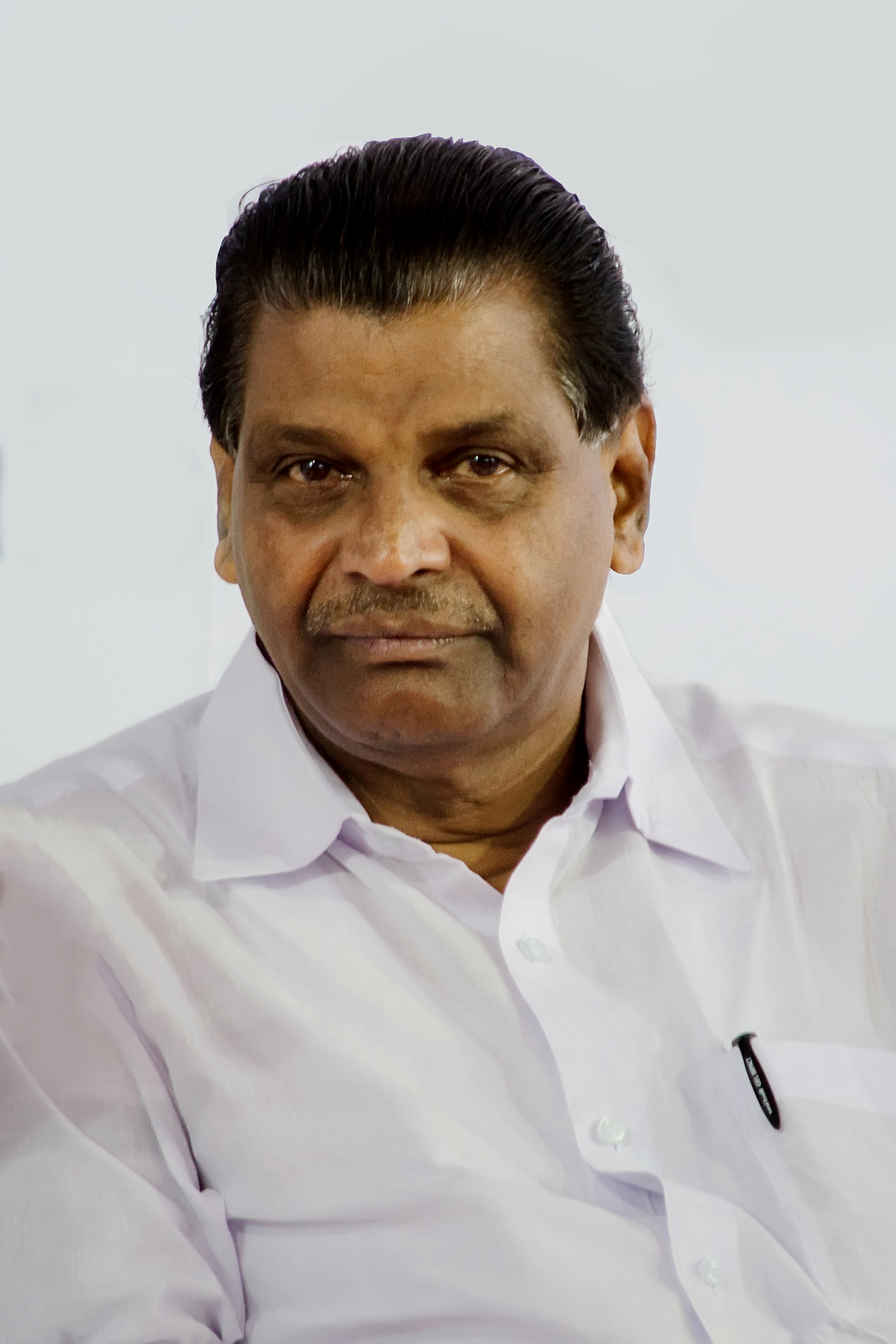
Thiruvanchoor Radhakrishnan, The current member of legislative assembly (MLA) from Kottayam

The major political parties active in Kottayam are Indian National Congress (INC), Communist Party of India (Marxist) (CPI(M)), Bharatiya Janata Party (BJP) and Kerala Congress. Trade union movements are also popular in Kottayam as Bharatiya Mazdoor Sangh (BMS, Indian Workers' Union), Indian National Trade Union Congress (INTUC) and Centre of Indian Trade Unions (CITU) affiliated workers engaged in the labor sector.

The current municipal chairperson is M.P Santhoshkumar and vice-chairperson is Sheeba Punnen. United Democratic Front (Kerala) (UDF[K]) is the ruling coalition of parties, holding a majority in the municipal council.

The current member of the legislative assembly (MLA) from Kottayam is Thiruvanchoor Radhakrishnan, who has been representing the Kottayam town constituency since 2011.

He is also the current Speaker of the Kerala Legislative Assembly.
