= Joseph Kalathiparambil =

His Grace, The Most Reverend Dr. Joseph Kalathiparambil
- Archbishop of Verapoly
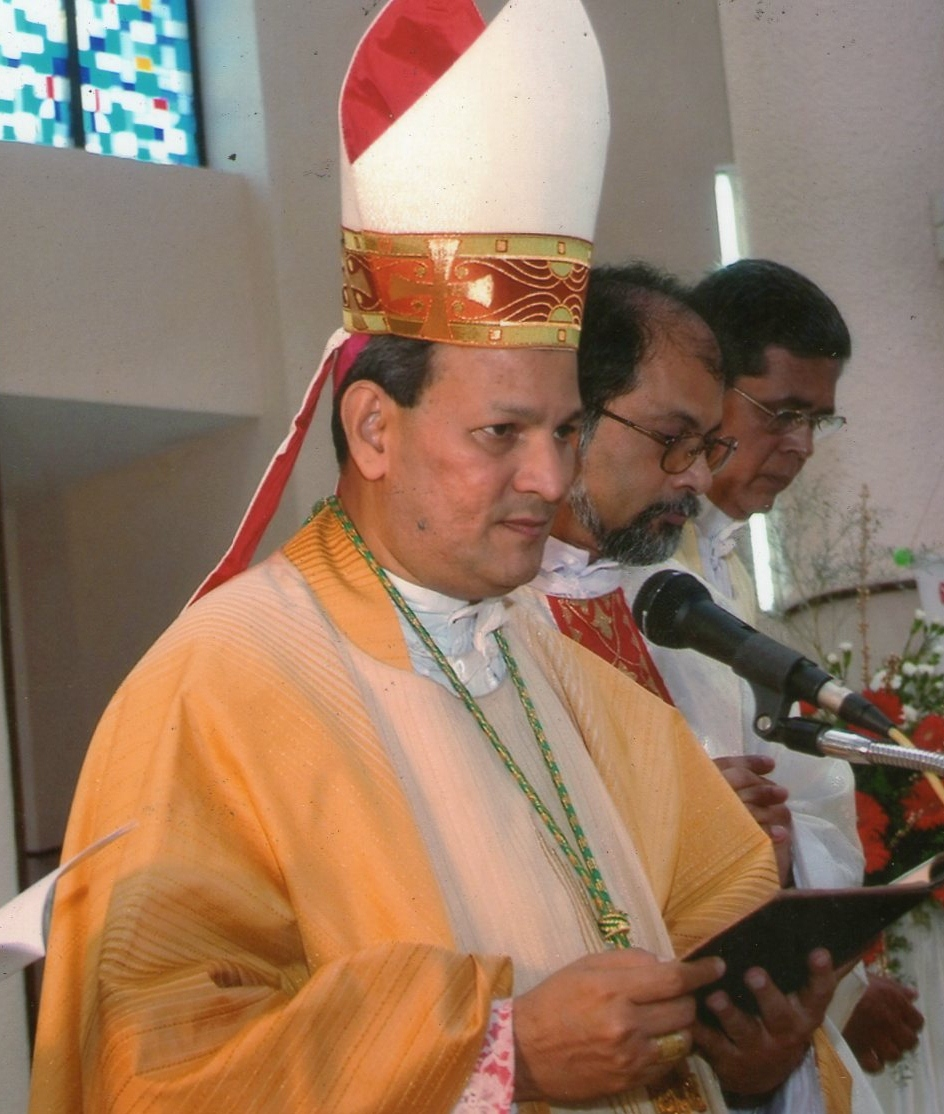
- Province: Verapoly
- Diocese: Verapoly
- See: Archdiocese of Verapoly; Latin: Archidioecesis Verapolitanus
- Appointed: 31 October 2016
- Installed: 18 December 2016
- Predecessor: Francis Kallarakal
- Previous posts: Secretary of the Pontifical Council for the Pastoral Care of Migrants and Itinerants (2011-2016); Member of the Congregation for the Evangelization of Peoples (2011-2016); Bishop of the Roman Catholic Diocese of Calicut (2002-2011)

Orders
- Ordination: 13 March 1978 by Archbishop Joseph Kelanthara
- Consecration: 19 May 2002 by Archbishop Daniel Acharuparambil
- Rank: Archbishop

Personal details
- Born: 6 October 1952 (age 74) Vaduthala, Kerala, India
- Motto: "Super Omnia Caritas" ("Love is the greatest of all")

Styles of Joseph Kalathiparambil
- Reference style: His Grace; The Most Reverend; The Right Reverend
- Spoken style: Your Grace
- Religious style: Archbishop
- Posthumous style: none

Ordination history of Joseph Kalathiparambil
History
Episcopal consecration
- Principal consecrator: Daniel Acharuparambil
- Co-consecrators: Maxwell Valentine Noronha; Varghese Chakkalakal

Joseph Kalathiparambil (born 6 October 1952) is the Archbishop of the Roman Catholic Archdiocese of Verapoly. He was formerly the Secretary of the Pontifical Council for the Pastoral Care of Migrants and Itinerants. He also served as the Bishop of the Roman Catholic Diocese of Calicut for almost nine years.

Archbishop Kalathiparambil is fluent in speaking and writing Malayalam, English, Italian and Latin.

== Life ==
Bishop Joseph Kalathiparambil was born on 6 October 1952 in Vaduthala, a suburb of the city of Cochin in Kerala, India. Bishop Joseph was ordained a priest on 13 March 1978 by Archbishop Joseph Kelanthara of the Verapoly Archdiocese. He is specialized in Canon Law from Rome and was appointed Vice Rector of Collegio San Paolo in Rome from 1984 to 1989. Later he moved back to Kerala and was appointed Chancellor of the Archdiocese of Verapoly on 15 August 1989. He served as the Chancellor for the Archdiocese from 1989 to 1996.

He was granted the title of Chaplain of His Holiness, Monsignor, in 1989 by Pope John Paul II. On 6 November 1996, he was made the Vicar General of Archdiocese of Verapoly. He was advanced to the papal Prelacy of Honour on 31 January 2001. He served as the Vicar-General of the Archdiocese from 1996 to 2002. He was nominated Bishop of Calicut on 19 April 2002 and was consecrated on 19 May 2002.

He served as the Bishop of Calicut for almost 9 years and was then appointed by Pope Benedict XVI as the Secretary of the Pontifical Council for the Pastoral Care of Migrants and Itinerants on 22 February 2011. On 5 March, he was also appointed as a Member of the Congregation for the Evangelization of Peoples.

Dr. Joseph Kalathiparambil was appointed as the Archbishop of Verapoly by Pope Francis on 31 October 2016. His formal installation as Archbishop of the Archdiocese of Verapoly took place on 18 December 2016. Cardinal George Alencherry, Major Archbishop of the Syro-Malabar Church, and Cardinal Baselios Cleemis, Major Archbishop of Trivandrum were a part of the installation ceremony.

== Episcopal motto ==
The motto of the Bishop's Coat of Arms is "Love is the greatest of all" ("Super Omnia Caritas") (I Cor. 13: 13).

== Pontifical Council for the Pastoral Care of Migrants and Itinerants ==
On 22 February 2011, Pope Benedict XVI appointed Bishop Joseph Kalathiparambil the Secretary of the Pontifical Council for the Pastoral Care of Migrants and Itinerants. After serving as the Bishop of the Roman Catholic Diocese of Calicut for almost 9 years, Bishop Joseph returned to Rome to take up his new appointment. He worked under Pope Benedict XVI for two years until Benedict's resignation as pope. He continued to serve under Benedict's successor, Pope Francis. He has served mass with Pope Francis.

== Visit to the Port of Tilbury, London ==
On 28 September 2011, a day before World Maritime Day, Bishop Joseph Kalathiparambil visited the Port of Tilbury, the principal Port for London. The main purpose of this visit was to oversee the work of the Catholic Maritime Agency, Apostleship of the Sea. Bishop Joseph also attended the launch of the Maritime Piracy – Humanitarian Response Programme in London. This was one of his first official overseas visits as Secretary of the Pontifical Council for the Pastoral Care of Migrants and Itinerants.

== Mass on cruise ships ==
On 21 March 2015, Bishop Joseph Kalathiparambil celebrated mass on board the cruise ship Costa Fascinosa after five passengers from the vessel were killed in the Bardo National Museum attack. On 16 October 2015, he celebrated mass for the crew of MV Britannia when it docked in Civitavecchia, and on 17 May 2016, for the crew of MV Oceana.
