= Peter Thuruthikonam =

Peter Thuruthkonam (1 August 1929 – 5 September 2011) was the Roman Catholic bishop of the Roman Catholic Diocese of Vijayapuram, India. He was born at Vallamkulam, Thiruvalla. He was ordained as a priest on 12 March 1959. He was ordained as the Bishop of the Diocese of Vijayapuram on 4 August 1988. He retired from his office in 2006. He is the first bishop from the Diocese of Vijayapuram.

Ordained to the priesthood in 1959 for the Vijayapuram Diocese, Thuruthknam was appointed bishop of the diocese and retired in 2006.
