= Varghese Chakkalakal =

Archbishop of Calicut

His Grace The Most Reverend Monsignor Varghese Chakkalakal
- Metropolitan Archbishop of Calicut
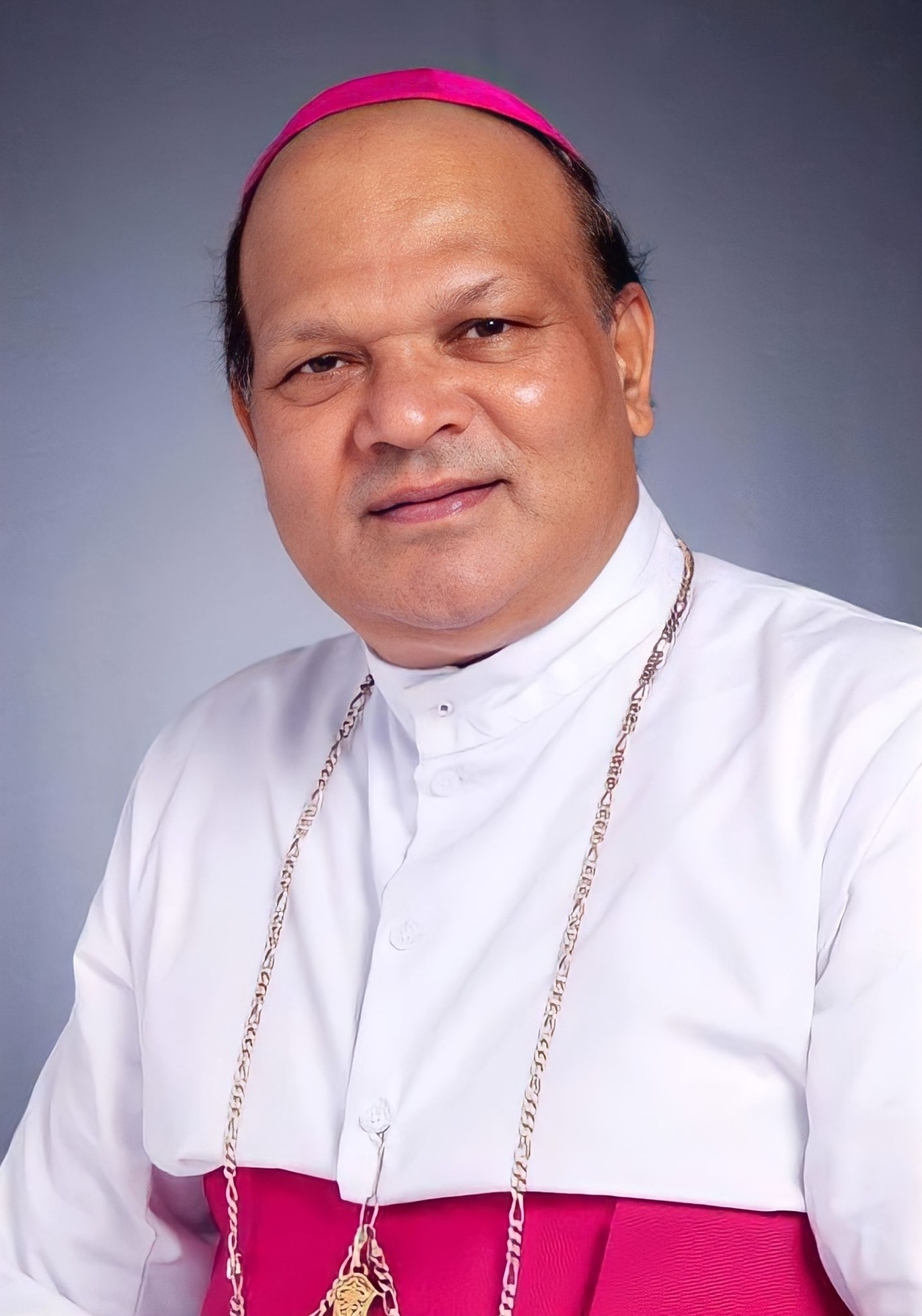
- Archdiocese: Calicut
- Appointed: 15 May 2012
- Previous post: Bishop of Kannur (1998-2012)

Orders
- Ordination: 2 April 1981
- Consecration: 7 February 1999 by Archbishop Daniel Acharuparambil, OCD

Personal details
- Born: 7 February 1953 (age 73) Malapallipuram, Kerala, India
- Denomination: Roman Catholic
- Education: Pontifical Urban University
- Motto: According to Your Will

Mons. Varghese Chakkalakal is the current metropolitan archbishop of the Roman Catholic Archdiocese of Calicut.

== Early life ==
Varghese was born on 7 February 1953 at Malapallipuram, Kerala, India.

== Education ==
He acquired his Master of Theology from Pontifical Seminary, Aluva, Kerala, India and also completed his Master of Arts specialising in History from University of Mysore. He acquired his doctorate in canon law from Pontifical Urban University, Rome. He was a professor of Fundamental Theology, Canon Law and Moral Theology.

== Priesthood ==
He joined St. Joseph's Seminary, Mangalore in 1971 for the diocese of Calicut. He was ordained a priest by Bishop Maxwell Noronha on 2 April 1981 in Mother of God Cathedral, Calicut. He also served as the Dean of Studies.

== Episcopate ==
- On 5 November 1998, he was appointed as the bishop of the Roman Catholic Diocese of Kannur and was consecrated as the first Bishop of Kannur *On 7 February 1999 by Archbishop Daniel Acharuparambil, OCD. His episcopal motto is "According to Your Will".
- On 15 May 2012 he was appointed bishop of the Roman Catholic Diocese of Calicut.
- On 12 April 2025, Pope Francis elevated the Diocese of Kozhikode to the status of an archdiocese and appointed Chakkalakal as its first Metropolitan Archbishop.
