= Francis Kallarakal =

Indian Roman Catholic Archbishop

The Most. Rev. Dr. Francis Kallarakal
- Archbishop Emeritus of Verapoly
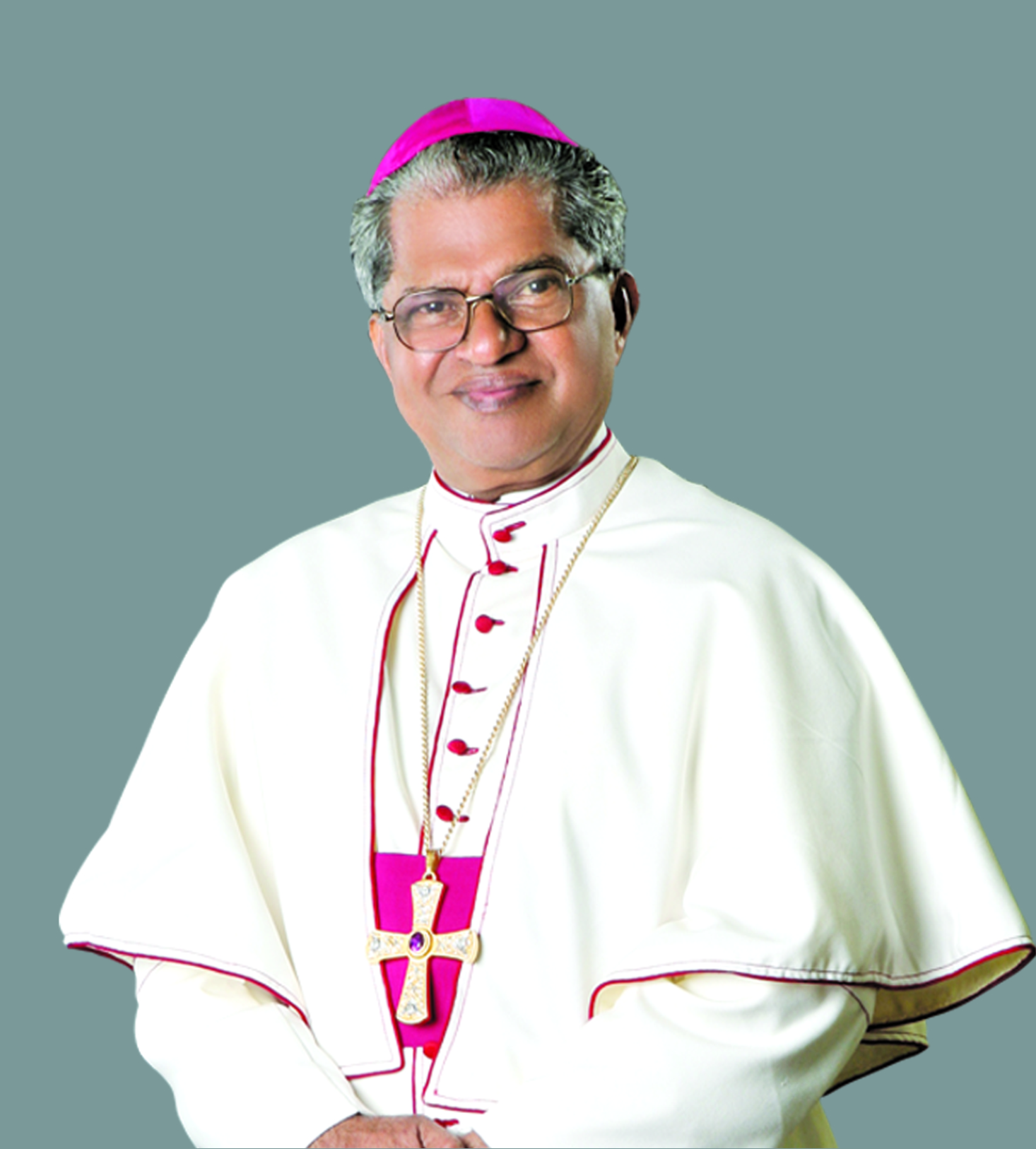
- The Most. Rev. Dr. Francis Kallarackal
- Province: Verapoly (Emeritus)
- Diocese: Verapoly (Emeritus)
- Installed: 11 April 2010
- Term ended: 18 December 2016
- Predecessor: Daniel Acharuparambil
- Successor: Joseph Kalathiparambil

Orders
- Ordination: 29 June 1968
- Consecration: 4 October 1987

Personal details
- Born: 10 October 1941 (age 84) Kottapuram, Trichur District.
- Denomination: Catholic

Styles of Francis Kallarackal
- Reference style: The Most Reverend
- Spoken style: Your Excellency
- Religious style: Archbishop

Francis Kallarackal was the Metropolitan Archbishop of the Roman Catholic (Latin Rite) Archdiocese of Verapoly in India. He was appointed by Pope Benedict XVI on 20 February 2010.

Born to Kallarackal Ouso and Brigitte of Kottapuram on 10 October 1941. He attended St. Albert's High School, Ernakulam and he joined the St. Joseph's Minor Seminary in 1956. After completing pre-degree course from St. Albert's College, Ernakulam, he joined St. Joseph's Pontifical Seminary, Carmelgiri, Alwaye, for pursuing studies in Philosophy. He completed his master's in theology from Propaganda College, Rome and was ordained as priest on 29 June 1968. He holds a Licentiate in Sacred Theology from Pontifical Urbaniana University, Rome and Post Graduation from Fairfield University, USA.

When he returned from abroad in 1970, he was appointed secretary to the then Archbishop Joseph Kelanthara.

From 1978 to 1986, he served as the social action director of the Archdiocese. He was then appointed the administrator of St. John's Medical College, Bangalore, which is established and managed by the Catholic Bishops' Conference of India. In 1987, as the Diocese of Kottapuram was created through the bifurcation of the Archdiocese of Verapoly, he became the first bishop of Kottapuram by the Apostolic Letter "Romani et Pontificis" dated 3 July 1987. With his episcopal consecration on the feast day of St. Francis Assisi, the Diocese of Kottapuram was inaugurated on 4 October 1987. As the Bishop of Kottapuram, he called for a Diocesan Synod, conducted in 2007-08.

Archbishop Kallarakkal is the Vice President of the Kerala Catholic Bishops Council and Kerala Regional Latin Catholic Council and Archbishop of Verapoly. He serves as vice-chairman of the Media Commission of the Kerala Catholic Bishops' Council, Chairman of the Carmelgiri Pontifical Seminary Episcopal Commission and KRLCC publication Jeevanadam. As the Metropolitan Archbishop of Verapoly the Kallarakal called a Diocesan Synod in Verpaoly, and a diocesan synod at Kottapuram while he was serving as the Bishop of Kottapuram. The Diocesan Synod in Verapoly proposed major reformas in the Archdiocese of Verapoly, giving the laity more participation in the Church.

== See also ==
- Catholic Church hierarchy
- Catholic Bishops' Conference of India
- Christianity in India
- Roman Catholicism in India
- List of Roman Catholic dioceses in India
- List of Catholic dioceses (structured view)
