= Archdiocese of Verapoly =

Latin Catholic archdiocese in Kerala, India

Coordinates: 9.9838°N 76.2751°E

Archdiocese of Verapoly Archidioecesis Verapolitana വരാപ്പുഴ അതിരൂപത
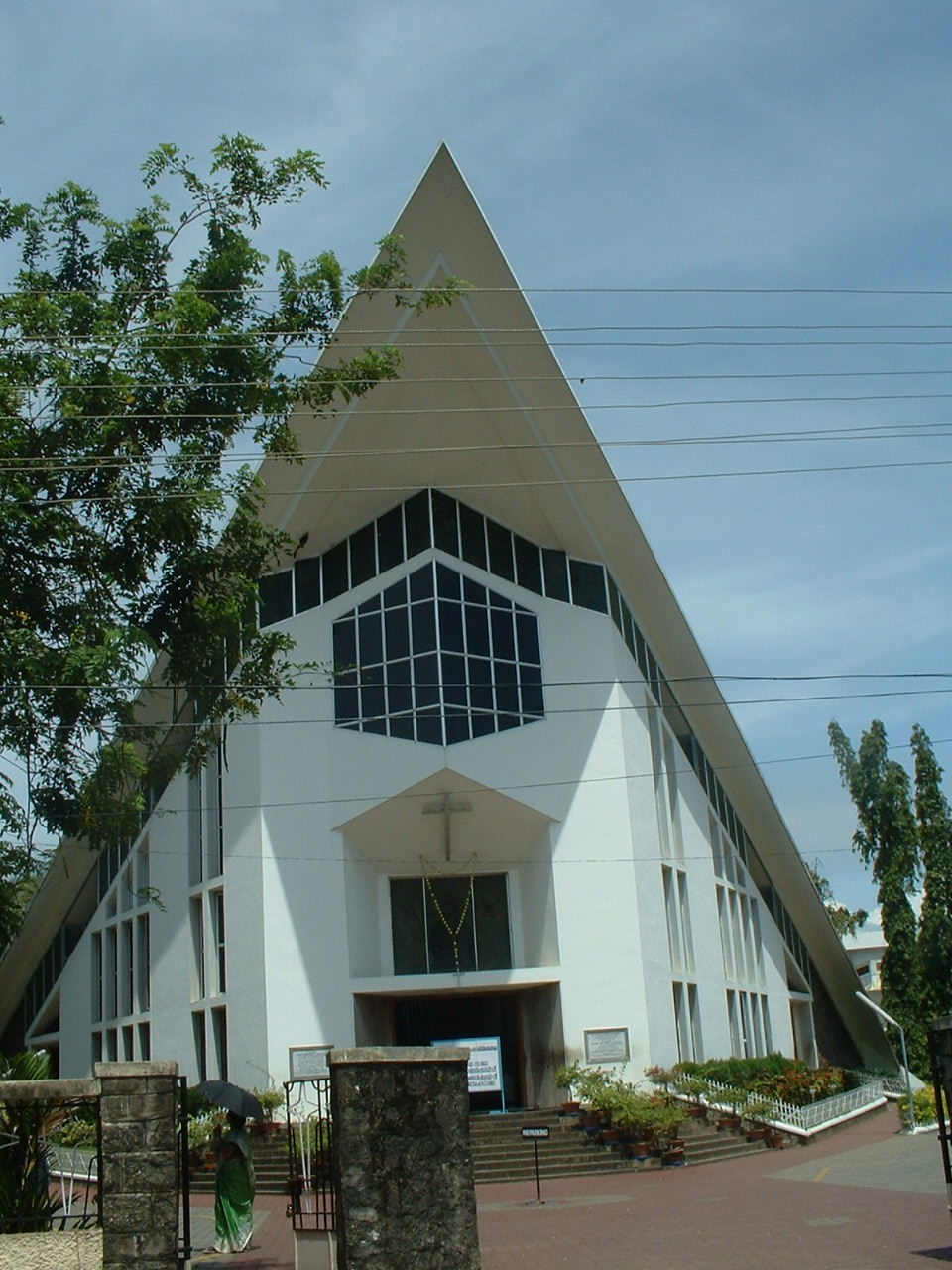
- St Francis of Assisi Cathedral, Varappuzha, Ernakulam

Location
- Country: India
- Territory: Kerala districts of Ernakulam and Thrissur
- Ecclesiastical province: Verapoly
- Metropolitan: Verapoly
- Deaneries: 8

Statistics
- Area: 1,500 km^{2} (580 sq mi)
- Population: Total; Catholics: (as of 2023); 3,908,084; 369,840 (9.5%)
- Parishes: 182 total; 88 parishes; 32 quasi-parishes; 62 mission stations

Information
- Denomination: Catholic Church
- Sui iuris church: Latin Church
- Rite: Roman Rite
- Cathedral: St Francis of Assisi Cathedral in Marine Drive, Ernakulam, Cochin
- Patron saint: Saint Joseph
- Secular priests: 382 (total); 210 (diocesan); 172 (religious orders)

Current leadership
- Pope: Leo XIV
- Metropolitan Archbishop: Joseph Kalathiparambil
- Auxiliary Bishops: Antony Valumkal

Website
- Official website

The Archdiocese of Verapoly (Malayalam: വരാപ്പുഴ അതിരൂപത, Latin: Archidioecesis Verapolitana) is a Latin Church ecclesiastical territory or archdiocese of the Catholic Church, comprising Latin Catholics of Malabar and headquartered at the city of Cochin, in the south Indian state of Kerala. The archdiocese has administrative control over the suffragan dioceses of Cochin, Kottapuram, and Vijayapuram. The headquarters is located in Kochi along the Malabar Coast in India. It was originally formed as the Vicariate Apostolic of Malabar in 1657 and became a metropolitan see in 1886. Verapoly is the anglicised name of Varapuzha.

== History ==
The Archdiocese of Verapoly was originally known as the Vicariate of Malabar erected from the Roman Catholic Diocese of Cochin, the first catholic diocese in Kerala. It has its origin in 1657, with the arrival of Carmelite missionaries, most prominent among whom was the priest Joseph of St. Mary, better known as Joseph Sebastiani. They had been deputed under Hyacinth of St. Vincent as Apostolic Commissar, by Pope Alexander VII to effect a reconciliation of Saint Thomas Christians of the Syro-Chaldaic Rite, who had seceded from the Archbishop Francis Garcia due to his over-stretched influence in the affairs of syro-chaldean eparchial province of India. The majority of them had, in 1653, revolted against the Archbishop and forsaking his authority by taking an oath for the purpose at the foot of a cross, thereafter called the Coonan Cross, situated in Mattancherry, and made their own Archdeacon Thomas their archbishop. By the efforts of Sebastiani, a large number of seceders were brought back to the Catholic fold. Nevertheless, they refused to be under the authority of Archbishop Garcia or under any prelate of the Jesuit Order known as the "Paulists".

Rome, being informed of the situation by Sebastiani in person, decided to entrust the Carmelites with the spiritual care of the Syro-Chaldaic Rite. For this purpose the Vicariate of Malabar was erected by Pope Alexander VII on 3 December 1659. Sebastiani was consecrated Titular Bishop of Hierapolis on 15 December 1659 and sent back to Malabar, with the title of Vicar Apostolic and Administrator of the Archbishopric of Cranganore. The new Vicariate eventually established its headquarters in the island of Verapoly.

The conquest of Portuguese territories in Malabar and especially of Cochin in 1663 by the Dutch and the consequent expulsion of all Catholic Missionaries from the territories occupied by the Dutch and elsewhere, threatened the very existence of the Malabar Vicariate. Nevertheless, it survived under the Indian Prelate Palliveettil Chandy (Alexander de Campo) whom Sebastiani had consecrated as his successor before he left Malabar in 1663. Before long Carmelites were allowed to resume their ministration which was by then extended also to the Catholics of the Latin Church who were under Portuguese protection.

On 13 March 1709 by a brief of Pope Clement XI Malabar Vicariate was suppressed and the Vicariate of Verapoly took its place with Bishop Angelo Francisco as its first Vicar Apostolic.

By the brief "Multa Praeclara" of Pope Gregory XVI, dated 24 April 1838, the Sees of Cranganore and Cochin which at that time included also Quilon, were annexed to the Vicariate of Verapoly which thus came to comprise the whole of Malabar. However, in 1845, Quilon was severed from Verapoly as a Suffragan Vicariate.

When by the famous apostolic letter "Humanae Salutis Auctor" of Leo XIII dated 1 September 1886, the Hierarchy of India was established, the Vicariate of Verapoly was raised to the status of an Archdiocese with Leonard Mellano of St. Louis as its first archbishop who was the 17th in the line of the Vicars Apostolic.

On 19 March 1887 the Catholics of the Syriac Rite were separated from those of the Latin Church and placed under an administrator, Marcelino Bernard of St. Teresa, who was consecrated co-adjutor to Archbishop Mellano. By brief "Quod Jam Pridem" of Pope Leo XIII, dated 20 May 1887, the Syriac Rite Catholics were exempted from the jurisdiction of the Archdiocese of Verapoly and the two Vicariates of Trichur and Kottayam were erected for Syro Malabar Church (Malankara Chaldean Syrian church/St Thomas Christians/ Nazranis) with Adolpus E. Medlycott and Charles Lavigne as their Vicars Apostolic. Thus the Archdiocese of Verapoly came to consist exclusively of Latin Catholics.

== Succession of Vicars Apostolic of Verapoly and Archbishops of Verapoly ==
- Giuseppe di Santa Maria Sebastiani (1661–1663), retired before the Dutch in 1663
- Alexander de Campo (1663–1678)
- Thomas de Castro (1675–1684)
- Raphael de Figuredo Salgado, 1681, retired on account of quarrels in 1694
- Custodio do Pinho (1694–1697)
- Angelus Francis of St. Teresa, 1700, was in 1709 entitled "Vicar Apostolic of Cranganore and Cochin" on account of long vacancy of those sees, died 1712
- John Baptist Multedo of St. Teresa (1714–1750)
- Florence of Jesus of Nazareth (1750–1773)
- Francis de Sales a Matre Dolorosa (1774–1787)
- John Mary of St. Thomas, 1780 (died before consecration)
- John Mary of Jesus, (1784–1802)
- Raymond of St. Joseph (1803–1816)
- Miles Prendergast (1819–1831), resigned
- Francis Xavier Pescetto of St. Anne (1831–1844)
- Ludovico Martini of St. Teresa (1839–1859), resigned
- Bernardino Baccinelli of St. Teresa, 1847 (1859), 1868, received archiepiscopal rank
- Leonardo Mellano of St. Louis, 1868, received archiepiscopal rank 1860, became first Archbishop of Verapoly in 1887, died 1897
- Bernard of Jesus (Felipe Arginzonis y Astobiza) (1897–1918), resigned
- Ángel María Pérez y Cecilia (1918–1934), resigned
- Joseph Attipetty (1934–1970), died
- Joseph Kelanthara (1971–1986), died
- Cornelius Elanjikal (1987–1996), resigned
- Daniel Acharuparambil, (1996–26 October 2009), died
- Francis Kallarakal, appointed on 20 February 2010; he was assisted by Auxiliary Bishop Joseph Karikkassery until the Auxiliary Bishop's appointment as Bishop of the Latin Catholic Diocese of Kottapuram, India, on Saturday, 18 December 2010. Term ended on 18 December 2016.
- Joseph Kalathiparambil, appointed on 31 October 2016. The Archbishop was formally installed on 18 December 2016.

== Affiliated Bishops, living ==
- Francis Assisi Chullikatt (Priest: 3 Jun 1978 to 29 Apr 2006)
- Francis Kallarakal (Archbishop: 20 Feb 2010)
- Joseph Karikkassery (Priest: 19 Dec 1973; Auxiliary Bishop: 25 Nov 2006 to 18 Dec 2010)
- Alex Vadakkumthala

== Suffragan dioceses ==
- Diocese of Cochin
- Diocese of Kottapuram
- Diocese of Vijayapuram

== Saints and causes for canonisation ==
- John Vincent
- Zacarias of Saint Teresa
- Aurelian of the Blessed Sacrament
- Eliswa Vakayil
- George Vakayil
- Michael Koodalloor (Theophane of Kottappuram)
- Joseph Attipetty
- Immanuel Lopez

== See also ==
- St. Philomena's Forane Church & St. Chavara Pilgrim Centre
- St George church
