= List of churches in Chennai =

Chennai (erstwhile Madras) is the capital of the South Indian state of Tamil Nadu, located on Coramandel coast off Bay of Bengal. Christianity arrived to Chennai with St. Thomas around 50CE. Portuguese arrived in 1522 and built a port called "San thome" (present Santhome in Chennai) and "Santhome Church" after the Christian apostle, St. Thomas, who is believed to have preached in the area between 52 and 70 CE. The English East India Company under Francis Day bought lands in Chennai and made On 22 August 1639 as Madras Day. A year later, the English built Fort St. George, the first major English settlement in India, Chennai has seen missionaries from Scotland, United Kingdom and France and Portugal and also missionaries of Franciscans, Jesuits and Dominicans.

== Santhome Church ==
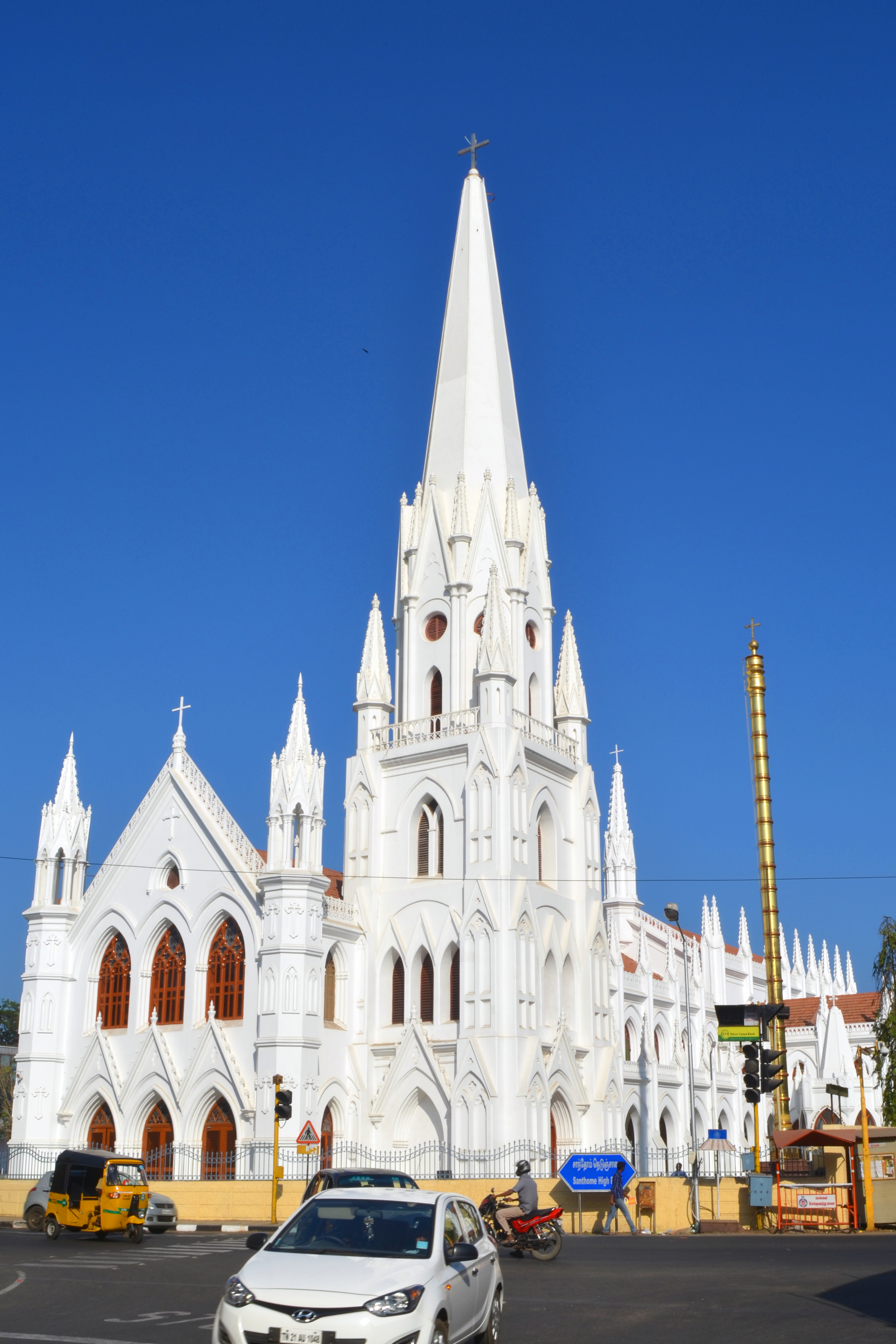
Santhome Church built by the Portuguese in 1523 and rebuilt by the British in 1893 over the tomb of Saint Thomas the Apostle.

Santhome Church is believed to be the oldest Church in Chennai, while there were a lot of churches built during the colonial empire.In 72 AD a small structure of building(church) was built to mark the tomb of Thomas the Apostle in the coast of Mylapore(presently Santhome, Chennai), later on a big church was built in the same place on 1523 by Portuguese explorers. This church became cathedral on 1606 by Pope Paul V with erecting the Diocese of Saint Thomas of Mylapore .Later this church was rebuilt with a status of cathedral in 1896 by British in late 19th century style as Gothic Revival architecture.The exact place where St. Thomas was buried is marked by the second small tower in the center of the cathedral. Pope Pius XII honoured this cathedral church, elevating it to the dignity and rank of minor basilica in March 1956. Pope John Paul II the only pope visited Santhome Church in the year of 1986. This church was extended as National Shrine in 2004 by Catholic Bishops' Conference of India. This church is called "National Shrine of Saint Thomas Cathedral Basilica", Shortly known as "Santhome Church".It is a very Important church for worldwide Christians as it is the tomb of St. Thomas the Apostle.

- Santhome Church
- Diocese of Saint Thomas of Mylapore
- History of Chennai
- Roman Catholic Archdiocese of Madras and Mylapore

== Famous Churches in Chennai ==
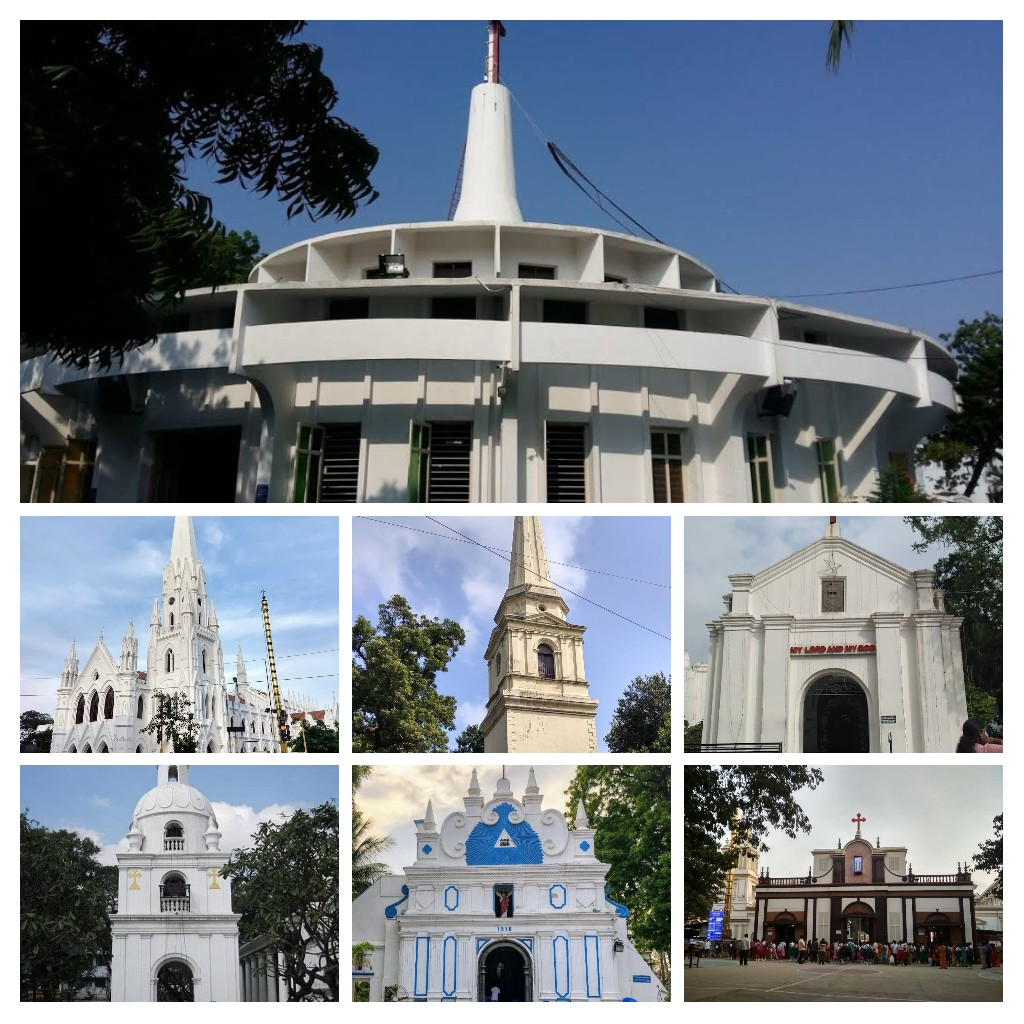
Famous Churches in Chennai

First row :

1. Shrine of Saint Thomas in Little Mount, Saidapet

Second row :

1. Santhome Church in Santhome, Mylapore.
2. St. Mary's Church in Fort St. George.
3. Saint Thomas Mount National Shrine in St. Thomas Mount.

Third row :

1. Armenian church in Armenian Street, George Town
2. Church of Our Lady of Light in Mylapore.
3. St Mary's Co-Cathedral in Armenian Street, George Town.

== Open places of worship ==
Name	Image	Year built	Location	Denomination/ Affiliation	Notes
San Thome Basilica	Three-quarter view of a long, low, flint rubble church on a rising grass slope with some gravestones	1523 (present church in 1896)	Santhome; 13.033611°N 80.2777°E	Roman Catholic (Latin rite)	It was built in the 1523 by Portuguese explorers, over the tomb of St Thomas, an Apostle of Jesus. In 1893, it was rebuilt as a church and elevated to the status of a cathedral by the British. It was designed in Neo-Gothic style, favoured by British architects in the late 19th century.It is a very important church for Christian in the world.
Zion Church, Chintadripet		1847	Chintadripet; 13.075194°N 80.271917°E	Church of South India	It is oldest churches in Chintadripet area of Chennai, the capital of the South Indian state of Tamil Nadu. The original structure was built in Gothic architecture in 1847 by US missionaries. The church is the oldest church built by US missionaries in Chennai. The church also has the second oldest bell in the city and second oldest pipe instrument in the city.
Anderson Church, Chennai		1845	Parry's Corner; 13.088611°N 80.288333°E	Church of South India	The original structure was built in 1845 by Anderson as an educational institution, which later evolved as Madras Christian College in 1867. The church is named after Anderson, a Scottish missionary who founded the mission of the Free Church of Scotland at Madras, India.
Armenian Church		1712(1772)	Armenian Street; 13.0891°N 80.2873°E	Church of South India	The Church, also called Armenian Church of Virgin Mary, was built by Armenian community of Madras and is famous for its belfry of six.
Luz Church		1516	Luz; 13.033333°N 80.25°E	Roman Catholic	The Church, also called Church of Our Lady of Light, by the locals, which derives from the Portuguese name Nossa Senhora da Luz. Built in 1516 by the Portuguese, it is one of the oldest Churches in the city and its foundation stone marks as one of the oldest European monuments in India.
Descanco Church		17th century	Luz; 13.033333°N 80.25°E	Roman Catholic	It was built in the 17th century by the Portuguese nobleman, Cosmo Madera of the prominent Madera family who are believed to have given their name to the city of Madras. Descanco Church is built in one of the two spots where the apostle St. Thomas is believed to have preached.
St Andrew's Church		1821	Nungambakkam; 13.0798°N 80.2637°E	Presbyterian	The church was built to serve the Scottish community in Chennai. Its design was modelled on St. Martin-in-the-Fields. Building started 6 April 1818 and the church was consecrated in 1821.
St. Anne's Church		2000	Nesapakkam; 13°2′9.592″N 80°11′25″E	Roman Catholic	The parish was established in 1999 and the church built the following year.
St. George's Cathedral		1815	Kamaraj Salai; 13.0518°N 80.2525°E	Church of South India	The cathedral was built in 1815. St. George's occupies an important place in the history of Christianity in India, as the Church of South India was inaugurated here on 27 September 1947. The Cathedral was packed and the big pandal outside held over 2,000 people. It marked the breaking down of ecclesiastical barriers between Protestants of various traditions.
St. Mary's Church		1680	Kamaraj Salai; 13.0787°N 80.2866°E	Church of South India	It is the oldest Anglican church East of Suez and also the oldest British building in India. The church is popularly known as the "Westminster Abbey of the East".
Saint Patrick's Cathedral		1680	St. Thomas Mount; 13.008127°N 80.195403°E	Roman Catholic	
St Mary's Co-Cathedral		1658	Armenian Street; 13.089866°N 80.287438°E	Roman Catholic	the church was constructed by a French Capuchin Father Ephrem de Nevers, the First Missionary of Madras who put up "the open pandall chappell" in Armenian Street in 1658. The structure, however, did not survive for long and had to be reconstructed in 1692. The church was renovated in 1775 and 1785 and promoted to the status of the cathedral of the Ecclesiastical Province of Madras in 1886.
St. Lazarus' Church		1582	Raja Annamalaipuram; 13.026282°N 80.274551°E	Roman Catholic	Lazarus Church was constructed by the Portuguese in the colony of Sao Tome de Meliapore in the 16th century AD. The oldest records of the church date from 1582. The church was rebuilt in 1637 by the Madeiros family and again, in 1928. In 1952, the Church was renamed as the "Church of Our Lady of Guidance".
St. Mark's Church		16th century	George Town; 13.103200°N 80.286230°E	Church of South India	It is in the neighbourhood of Georgetown in Chennai, India. The construction of the church was commenced by John Goldingham in 1799 and completed in 1800.
St. Matthias' Church		1823	Vepery; 13.087326°N 80.261490°E	Church of South India	It is a Protestant church situated in the neighbourhood of Vepery and was constructed and consecrated in 1823. It was originally a private chapel, the Chapel of Our Lady of Miracles, owned by Coja Petrus Uscan. In November 1752, years after Uscan's death, the chapel was obtained by SPCK, the Danish Protestant mission from Tranquebar for Rs. 50,000. The SPCK renamed the chapel as St. Matthias' Church. The church was consecrated in 1823.
St. Peter's Church		1829	Royapuram; 13.108333°N 80.295556°E	Roman Catholic	The original structure was built in Gothic architecture in 1829 by Gurukula Vamsha Varnakula Mudaliars, a gang of boatmen who were serving the East India Company. The chapel was controlled by Vicar Apostolic initially and then split into two churches namely St. Peters and St. Antony's based on the two divisions of Gurukula Vamsha Varnakula Mudaliars, with the former supporting Irish Mission and the latter supporting Goanees.
St. Thomas Garrison Church		1830	St. Thomas Mount; 13.002222°N 80.196667°E	Church of South India	The Church was built by the British government at the request of the army officers in the area in 1830. The church was constructed with bomb-proof roof and rust-proof iron railings, and most of the equipments for the construction were imported from Britain. It is located in the foothills of St. Thomas Mount and named after St. Thomas, one of the Twelve apostles who resided at the place during his final years.
Wesley Church		1905	Egmore; 13.079444°N 80.256667°E	Church of South India	The original structure was built in Gothic architecture in 1905 by Wesleyan Mission. It was constructed at Egmore considering the growing needs of it in the area around Egmore. The church is named after John Wesley, the founder of Methodist Movement in 140 countries.
St. Thomas Syrian Catholic Church	The Alter of St. Thomas Pilgrimage center	2017	St. Thomas Mount, Guindy	Syrian Catholic Church	The church is constructed in its original Oriental Architecture . The pilgrimage center houses a host of Glass paintings which upholds the legacy of the Syrian Christians . Constructed in the foot holds of St. Thomas Mount, The place of Martyrdom of St.Thomas, the apostle of Jesus Christ.
St.Jude's Pilgrimage Shrine		1975	Vanuvampet, Chennai - 91 12°58'53.6"N 80°11'44.9"E	Roman Catholic Church	

== Cathedral in Chennai ==
- St. Thomas Cathedral Basilica, Chennai of Roman Catholic denomination.
- St. George Cathedral of Church of South India denomination.
- St . Mary's Co'Cathedral of Roman Catholic denomination.
- St. Antony's Cathedral of Syro Malabar Catholic denomination.
- St. Thomas Cathedral of Malankara Orthodox Syrian Church denomination.

== Basilica in Chennai ==
- St. Thomas Cathedral Basilica, Chennai in Santhome.

== Shrine in Chennai ==
- Luz Church in Mylapore.
- Santhome Church in Santhome. (One of the National Shrine in India)
- Sacred heart Shrine in Egmore.
- Votive Shrine of Immaculate heart of Mary in Kilpauk.
- Annai Velankanni Shrine in Besant Nagar, Chennai.
- Shrine of Saint Thomas in Saidapet.
- Saint Jude Shrine in Madipakkam.
