= Descanco Church =

Church in Chennai, India

Descanco church
- Descanco church
- 13.028725°N 80.258645°E
- Address: Mylapore, Chennai, Tamil Nadu
- Country: India
- Denomination: Roman Catholic church

History
- Founder: Cosmo Madera
- Consecrated: 17th century

Descanco Church is a church in the neighbourhood of Mylapore in Chennai, India. It was built in the 17th century by the Portuguese nobleman, Cosmo Madera of the prominent Madera family who is believed to have given their name to the city of Madras. Descanco Church is built in one of the two spots where the apostle St. Thomas is believed to have preached. Descanco Church is situated at a distance of two kilometres from Luz Church.
