= Our Lady of Light Church, Chennai =

Catholic shrine in India

Church of Our Lady of Light
- Kaatu kovil
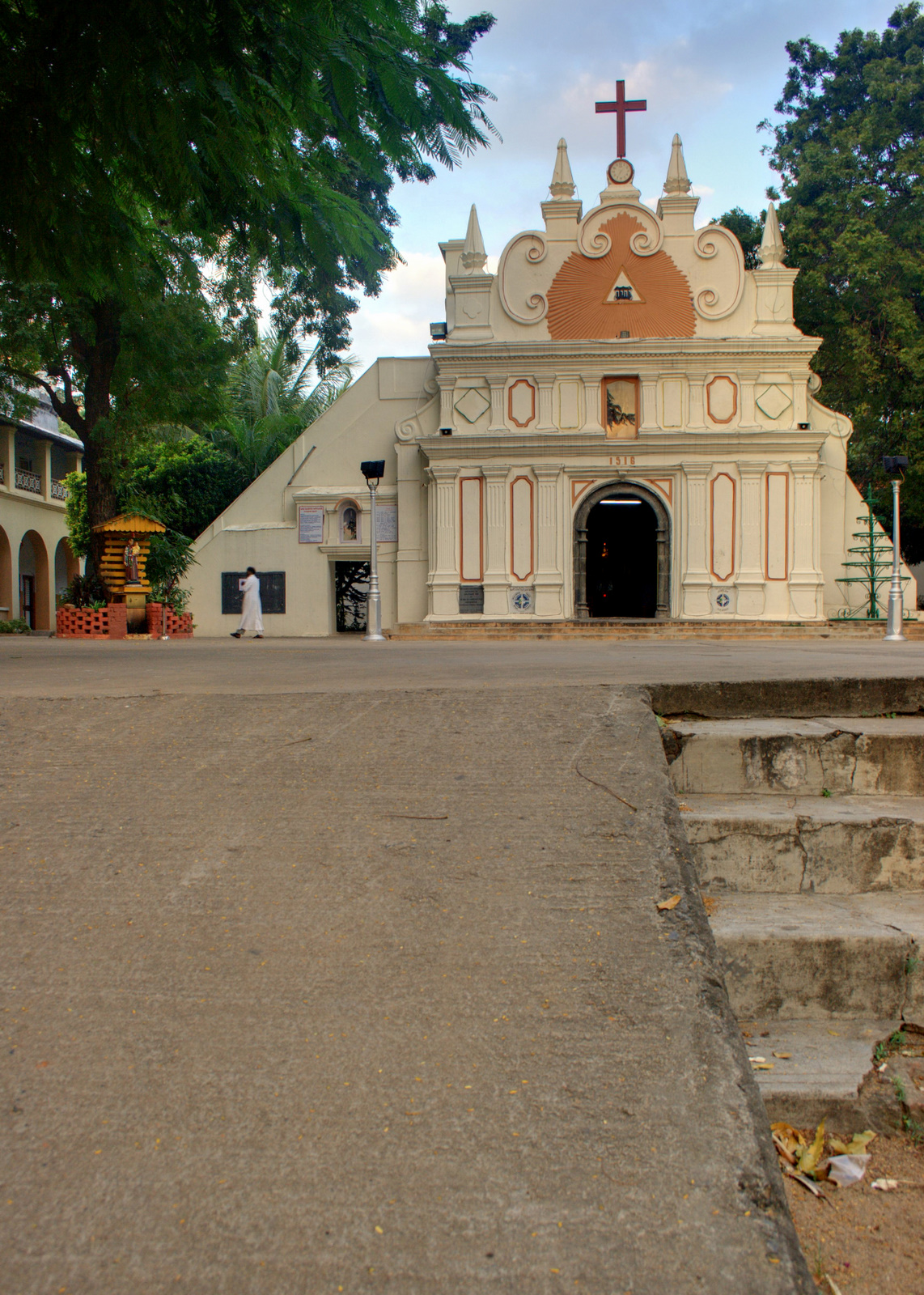
- Luz church at Mylapore Luz church

- Our Lady of Light shrine (Luz Church), Mylapore, Chennai, Tamil Nadu
- 13°02′17.4″N 80°15′44.8″E
- Location: Chennai
- Country: India
- Denomination: Catholic Church (Latin Church)

History
- Status: Marian shrine
- Founded: 1516; 510 years ago
- Founder: Portuguese missionaries.
- Dedication: Our Lady of Light

Architecture
- Functional status: Active
- Style: Gothic Revival
- Groundbreaking: 1515
- Completed: 15 August 1516

Administration
- Archdiocese: Roman Catholic Archdiocese of Madras and Mylapore
- Parish: Luz Church Parish

Clergy
- Archbishop: Rev. Archbishop George Antonysamy
- Priest: Rev. Fr. Bernard Lawrence

Church of Our Lady of Light (Tamil: பிரகாச மாதா ஆலயம்) is a Catholic shrine in Chennai, India. The locals commonly call it Luz Church, which derives from the Portuguese name Nossa Senhora da Luz. Built in 1516 by the Portuguese, it is one of the oldest Churches in the city and its foundation stone marks as one of the oldest European monuments in India. The history of the church dates back to the 16th-century legend of safe arrival to land by missionaries. The church is located very near to the Santhome Basilica, where Apostle Thomas is believed to be buried.

Although at the time the church was built, the locality was a thick forest, now it is part of a bustling metropolitan area. This 16th-century European-architecture building consists of patterns of Gothic arches and Baroque ornamentation. The feast of Our Lady of Light is celebrated on 15 August every year. On 15 August 2010, Church of Our Lady of Light was declared Shrine of Our Lady of Light by A. M. Chinnappa, Archbishop of Madras-Mylapore.

== History ==
=== Background ===
The historical background of this church is intertwined with the traditional history of Christianity in India. Arrival of Christianity in India is of two phases, where by traditional accounts, St. Thomas brought the religion in the first century and attained martyrdom in Chennai in AD 53. The second phase is after the arrival of the Portuguese in the 15th century. The legends of the Church of Our Lady of Light connects both.

=== Legend ===
The history of the Church is compounded with the history of the arrival of the Portuguese to India. Soon after Vasco da Gama discovered the sea-route to India, the legend states, that eight Franciscan priests left for India from Lisbon with the fleet of Pedro Álvares Cabral on 9 March 1500. They landed in Calicut, where three of the Friars were slain on 16 November 1500. The others reached Cochin, and settled down of preach the good news. A few years later, they sailed down South to spread their message further. It is said, that the Friars were lost in the rough sea and started praying to Mother Mary for their safety. The legend states that they were miraculously guided by a mysterious bright light which guided them safe to land. The Friars that in honour of their safe arrival to the land, built the Church of Our Lady of Light (Portuguese: Nossa Senhora da Luz). The church would later suffer damages inflicted from the forces of Golconda between 1662 and 1673. During the times of Haider Ali's invasion of the city forts between 1780 and 1782, the British East India Company Forces occupied the Luz Parish Residence for some years. Currently this church also governs the Stella Maris College, Chennai.

== Location ==
The church is located in Mylapore local of Chennai and at the time it was built, this part of Mylapore is believed to have been a thick forest. Thus the church gets its local name in Tamil as "Kaatu Kovil" (Tamil: காட்டுக் கோவில்) (Jungle Temple). It is located about 1.5 km from the Santhome Basilica where Apostle of Jesus Saint Thomas is buried. Although now a bustling locale, it is believed that this area could have been covered with mangroves in the early days. The road leading to the church is now named as Luz Church road after the church itself.

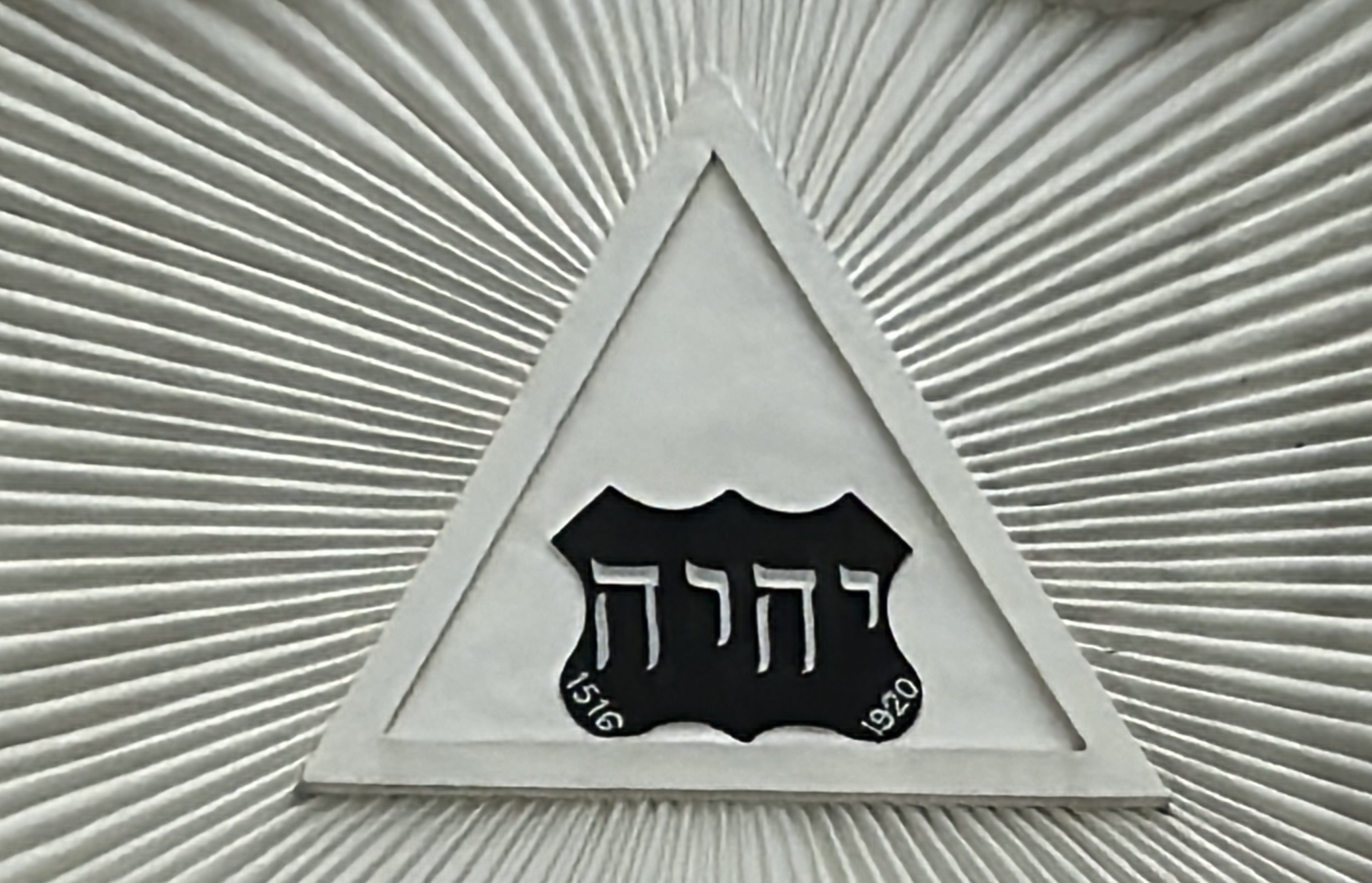
tetragrammon :Jehovah - name of God for Christians- Chennai 1516

the tetragrammaton is visible on the main facade at a height of about 6 meters.

== Architecture ==
The existing structure at Luz was built by the Portuguese in 1516. The architecture of the building consists of patterns of Gothic arches, Baroque ornamentation compounded with classical European style. The altars are gilded with silver and gold leaves and the ceilings with powder blue fresco paintings. The building plan resembles the Portuguese style in more than one way. Luz church represents one of the many attempts made by these people to leave their identity in far-off places. The foundation stone of this church is considered to be one of the oldest European monuments in India.

== Feast ==
The feast of Our Lady of Light is celebrated on 15 August every year which is also the day of Indian independence and hence a national holiday. The day is also as the feast of Assumption of Mary. The feast is celebrated with a grand mass and car procession.

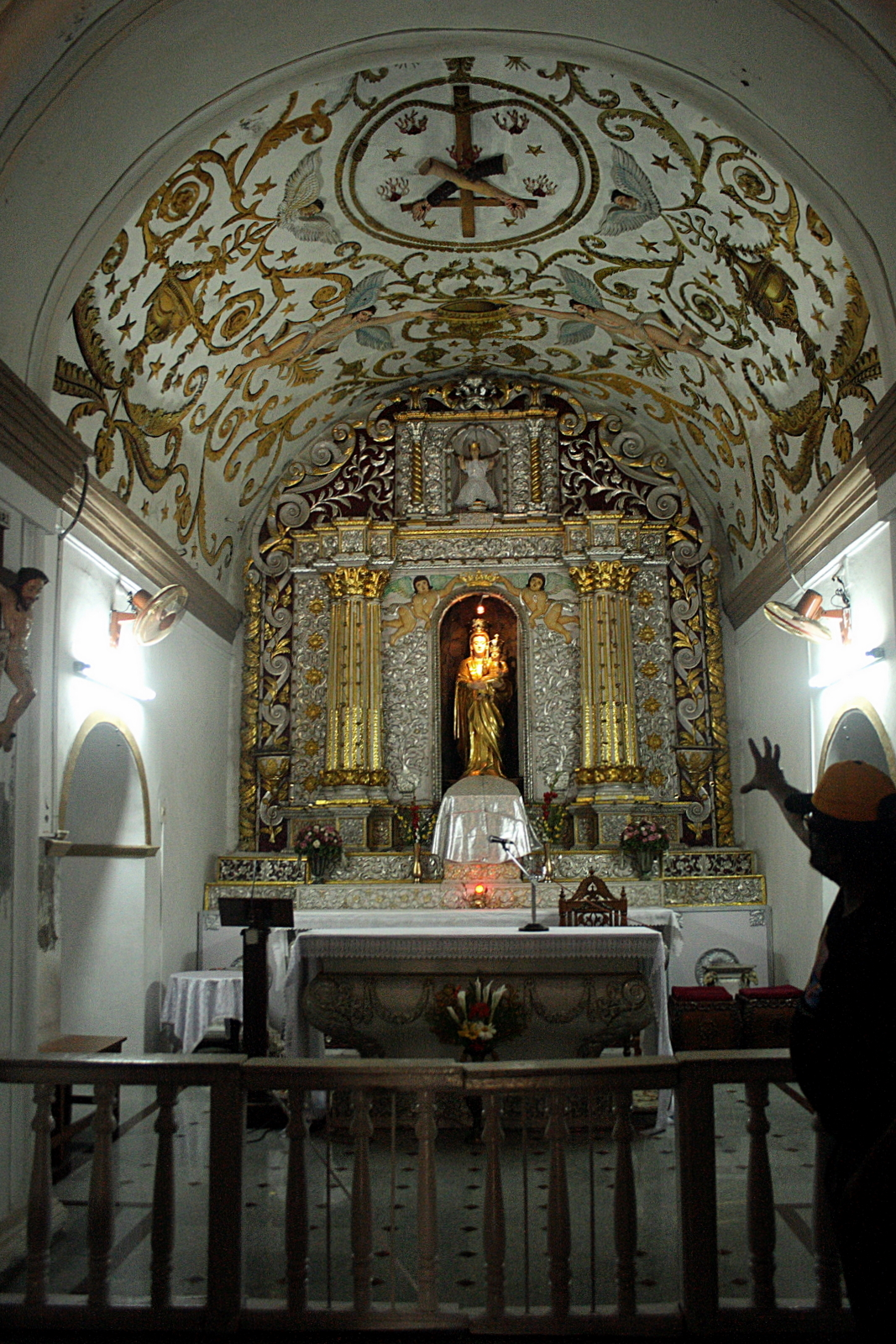
Altar of luz church

== See also ==
- Christianity in India
- Santhome Church
