= St. Thomas Cathedral Basilica, Chennai =

Coordinates: 13°2′1″N 80°16′40″E

Santhome Church
- National Shrine of Saint Thomas Basilica
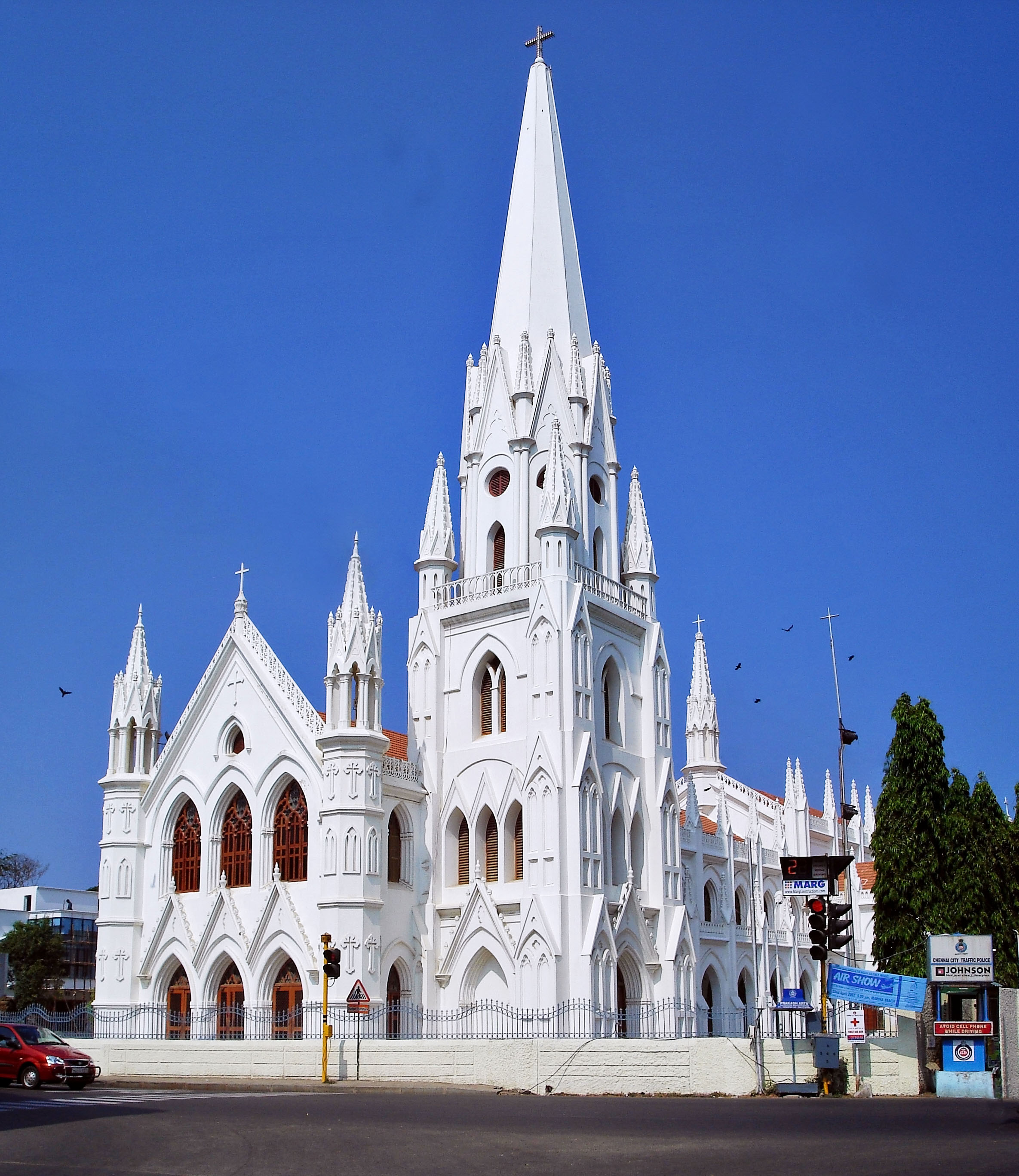
- Santhome Basilica
- Location: 38 Santhome High Road, Chennai, Tamil Nadu
- Country: India
- Language(s): Tamil and English
- Denomination: Catholic Church
- Tradition: Latin Church
- Website: www.santhomechurch.org

History
- Status: Minor basilica
- Founded: 1523 (503 years ago)
- Founder: Portuguese explorers
- Dedication: Thomas the Apostle

Architecture
- Functional status: Active
- Heritage designation: National Shrine
- Architect: Captain J. A. Power (current structure)
- Style: Neo-Gothic
- Groundbreaking: 1500
- Completed: 1523 (Current building 1896)

Specifications
- Length: 64 metres (210 ft)
- Width: 12.2 metres (40 ft)
- Height: 41 metres (135 ft)

Administration
- Province: Chennai
- Diocese: Madras and Mylapore

Clergy
- Archbishop: Archbishop George Antonysamy (2012–present)
- Priest: Rev Fr Vincent Chinnadurai

San Thome Church, officially known as the National Shrine of St. Thomas Cathedral Basilica, is a church of the Catholic Church in India, at the Santhome neighbourhood of Chennai, in Tamil Nadu. It is the cathedral of the Archdiocese of Madras-Mylapore, and a minor basilica dedicated to Saint Thomas the Apostle. The present structure dates back to 1523 AD, when it was built by the Portuguese over the tomb of Thomas. In 1896, it was renovated in the Madras province according to neo-Gothic designs, as was favoured by British architects in the late 19th century. On April 1, 1896, it was solemnly consecrated by Bishop Reed da Silva of Madras, assisted by the Bishop of Dhaka, Peter Joseph Hurth.

== History ==
=== Portuguese Era ===
Santhome Church, as built by the Portuguese in 1523

In 1521, the Portuguese in Goa and Bombay-Bassein sent missionaries to Madras (now Chennai) in search of the tomb of Thomas the Apostle, who by local tradition had come to South Asia to preach the Gospel and spread the teachings of Jesus Christ. The site they found was neglected and the Portuguese decided to rebuild the shrine over the tomb. With the support and authority of King John III of Portugal they started building the church, which was consecrated in 1523. Portuguese Padroado priests resumed the daily celebration of liturgy (Holy Mass) at the site.

In 1545, Francis Xavier visited the shrine and lived for about one year in the presbytery of the Santhome Church before he left for his mission in Ilha Formosa (Taiwan). When he lived in the church, he regularly prayed in front of a statue of the Virgin Mother Mary and celebrated Holy Mass; he also prayed regularly at the tomb. The church was made a cathedral in 1606 by Pope Paul V with the creation of the Diocese of Saint Thomas of Mylapore.

=== British Era ===
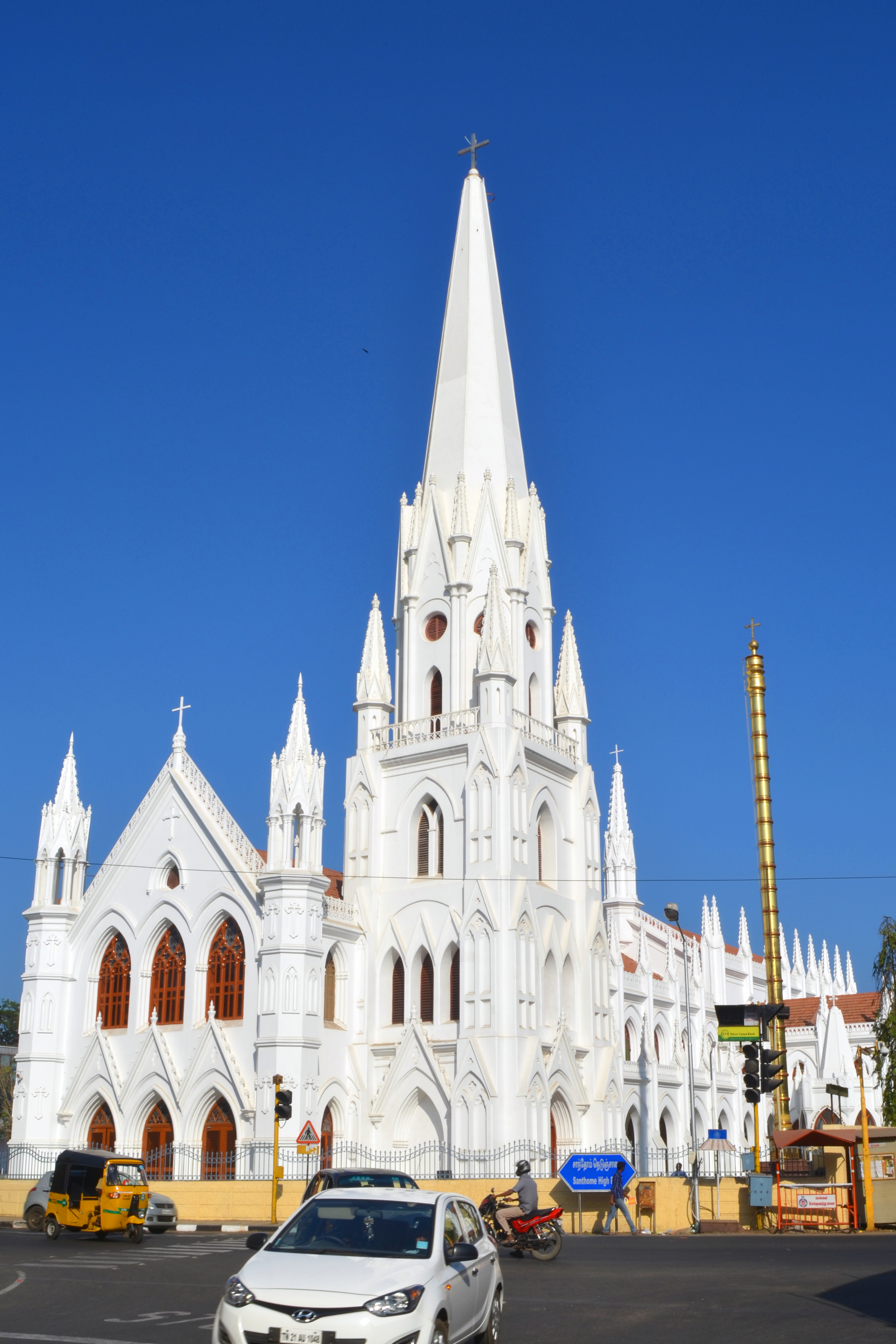
Santhome Cathedral, as rebuilt by the British in 1896

The church was rebuilt in 1896 by the British in the style of Gothic Revival architecture. The place where Thomas is believed to be buried is marked by the second small tower in the centre of the cathedral. Pope Pius XII honoured this cathedral church, elevating it to the dignity and rank of a minor basilica in 1956. Pope John Paul II is the only pope to have visited the church, in 1986. The church was declared a National Shrine in 2004 by the Catholic Bishops' Conference of India, and became known as the National Shrine of Saint Thomas Cathedral Basilica.

== Architecture ==
Santhome Church exhibits the Gothic revival architecture style of the late 19th century. It has a rib vault ceiling made of teak wood, with marble and granite used in other parts of the construction. It was built with 16 windows and 34 stained glass panels, with a main stained glass over the altar representing Thomas the Apostle touching the wound of Christ. The statue in the main altar represents "Thomas the Apostle as priest and Jesus Christ as king". In addition, there are 14 Stations of the Cross attached at the side wall of the cathedral.

The church has two spires. The primary spire, at the left side of the church's entrance, is 45 metres (147 ft) tall. It can be seen from a distance and serves as a bell tower. The second spire rises from the centre of the church to indicate the position of the believed tomb of Thomas.

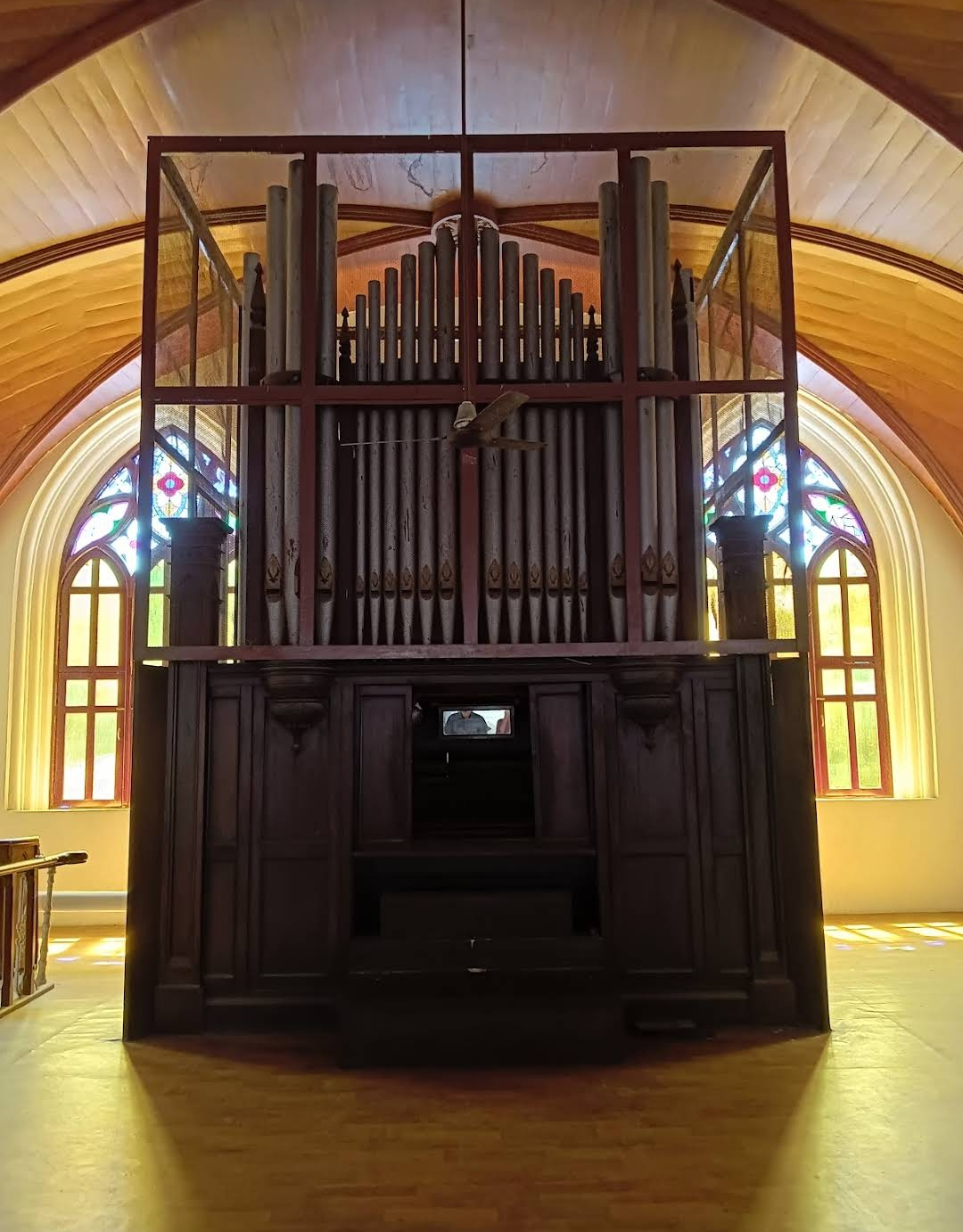
Pipe organ in Santhome Church

A 200-year-old British pipe organ is installed in the church's gallery, reached by stairs at the entrance.

An adoration chapel adjoining the main church provides for silent moments before the Blessed Sacrament. This chapel can be approached from the left wing of the church apart from an exclusive entrance from the outside.

== Observances ==
=== Mylai Matha ===
A gold-painted wooden statue of Mother Mary was brought from Lisbon to Santhome Church in 1523. It is installed at the left side of the church altar and is referred to as Our Lady of Mylapore or, locally, Mylai Matha.

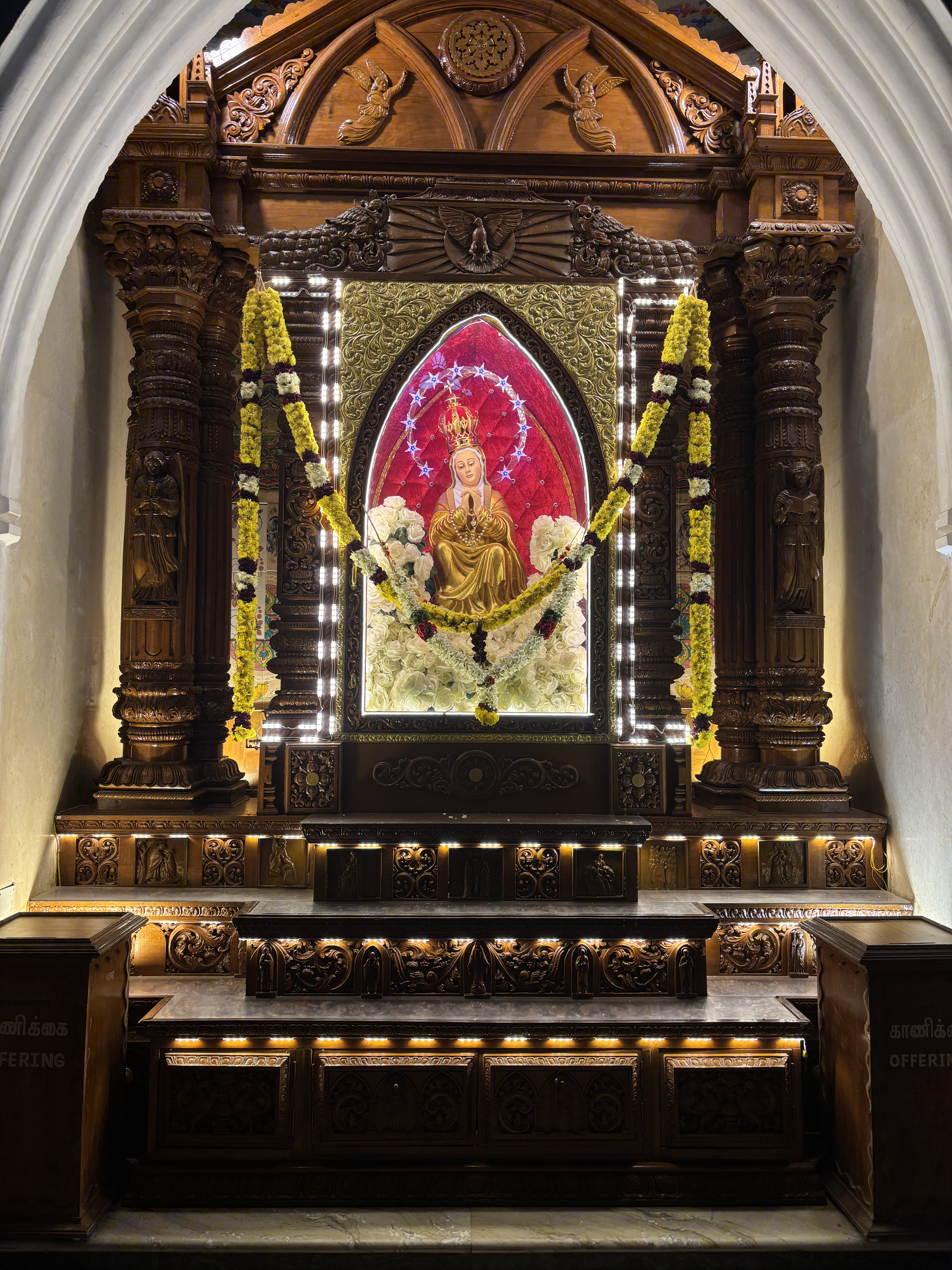
Altar of Mylai Matha consisting 500-year-old wooden Mary statue at Santhome Church

The feast of Mylai Matha is celebrated in December. Worshippers show devotion to Mylai Matha on the second Saturday of the month, with special prayers, procession, rosary and benediction in the evening. The tradition is held to have begun with Francis Xavier.

=== Pole of St. Thomas ===
A wooden pole at the church is believed by worshippers to have been washed ashore and erected by Thomas the Apostle. These worshippers believe the presence of the pole saved the church from the 2004 tsunami.

== Key dates ==
- AD 72 – Saint Thomas the Apostle believed to have died in St. Thomas Mount and was buried in Mylapore (present-day Santhome).
- 1291 – Italian Franciscan missionary John of Montecorvino visited the tomb.
- 1292 – Venetian explorer Marco Polo visited the tomb.
- 14th century – Franciscan missionaries visited the tomb.
- 1425–1430 – Venetian explorer Nicolo Conti visited.
- 1517 – Portuguese missionaries arrived in Mylapore.
- 1522 – Construction of a new church over the tomb began.
- 1523 – Santhome Church was opened by the Portuguese.
- 1545 – Francis Xavier visited the church.
- 1606 – Santhome Church was raised to a cathedral by Pope Paul V.
- 1893 – The British started rebuilding the Portuguese cathedral with Neo-gothic styled architecture.
- 1896 – Santhome Church opened by British with the status of cathedral.
- 1927 – Santhome Church is granted the honor of minor basilica by Pope Pius XI, making the first minor basilica in Tamil Nadu.
- 1986 – Pope John Paul II visited.
- 2004 – The church undergoes major restoration and tomb of St. Thomas is renovated with the construction of new underground chapel.
- 2006 – Santhome Church was declared a National Shrine.
- 2024 – Commemorative arch was unveiled at Santhome Basilica as part of the 1950th-year celebrations of martyrdom of St. Thomas the Apostle.

== Relics ==
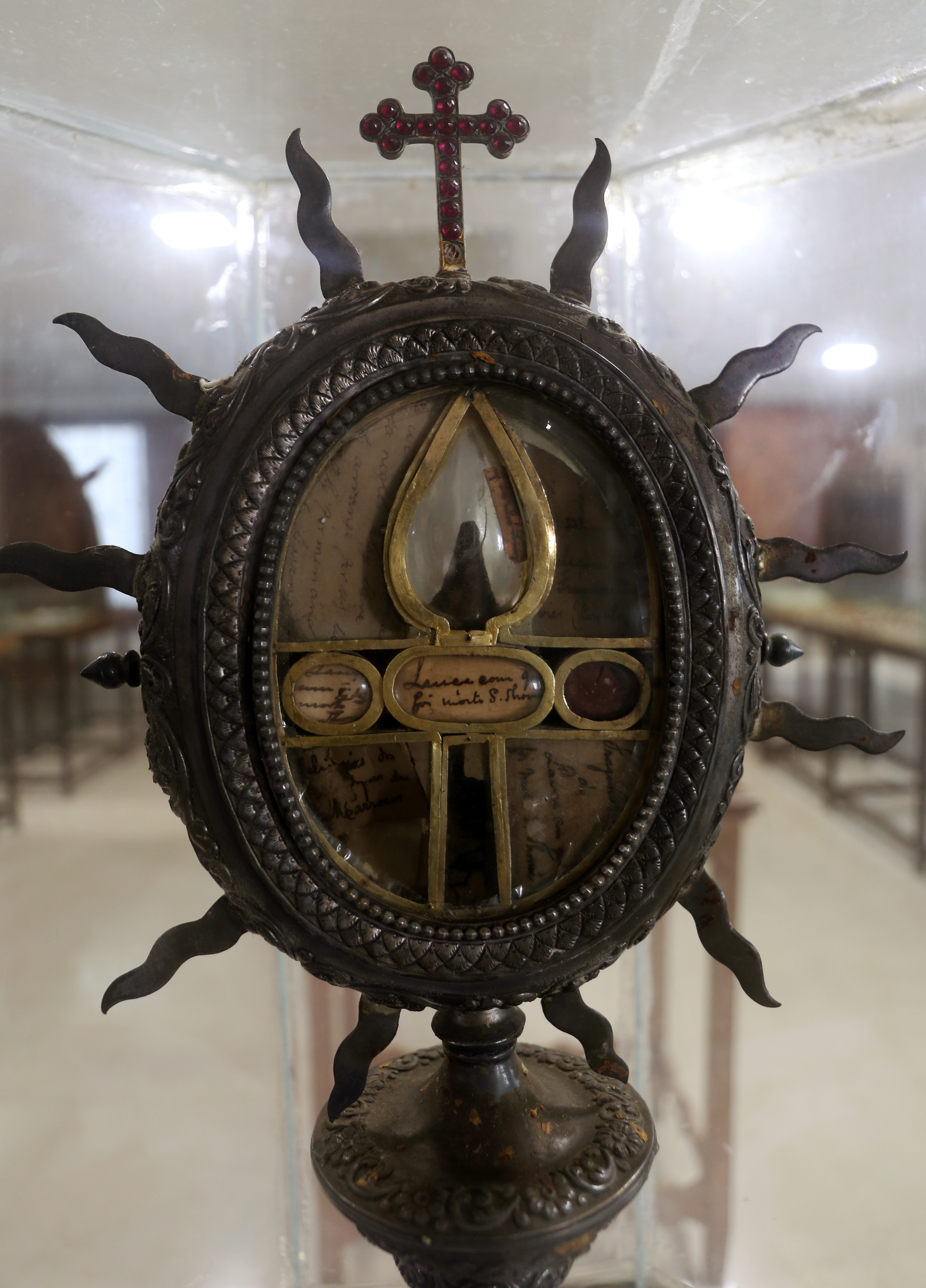
Spearhead said to have killed Saint Thomas

Relics claimed to be held at the church include:

- Bones of Thomas the Apostle
- Spearhead that was used to kill Saint Thomas at St. Thomas Mount
- Holy relic of Francis Xavier
- Holy relic of Bartholomew the Apostle
- Holy relic of Philomena

== Burials ==
- Thomas the Apostle
- Bishop Louis Mathias
- Bishop Antony Devotta
- Archbishop Casimir Gnanadickam
- Archbishop Anthony Rayappa Arulappa
- Archbishop Aruldas
- Bishop Francis Arthur Carvalho
- Dominican friar Nicholas of Pistoia
- Governor A. J. John

== Gallery ==
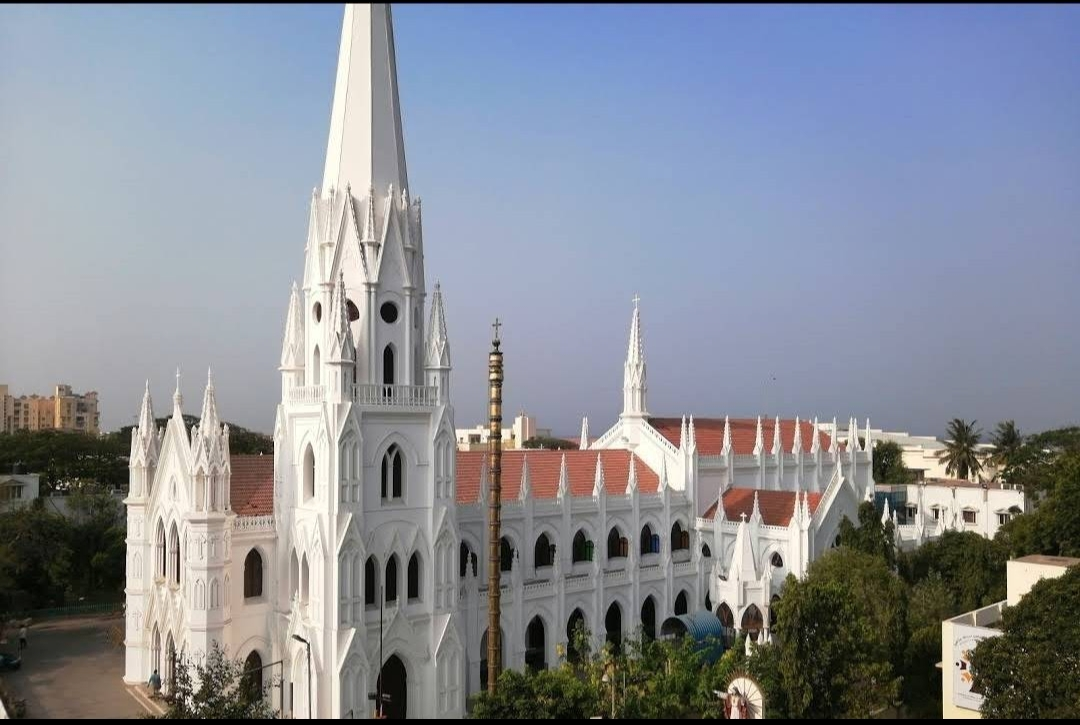
Aerial side view

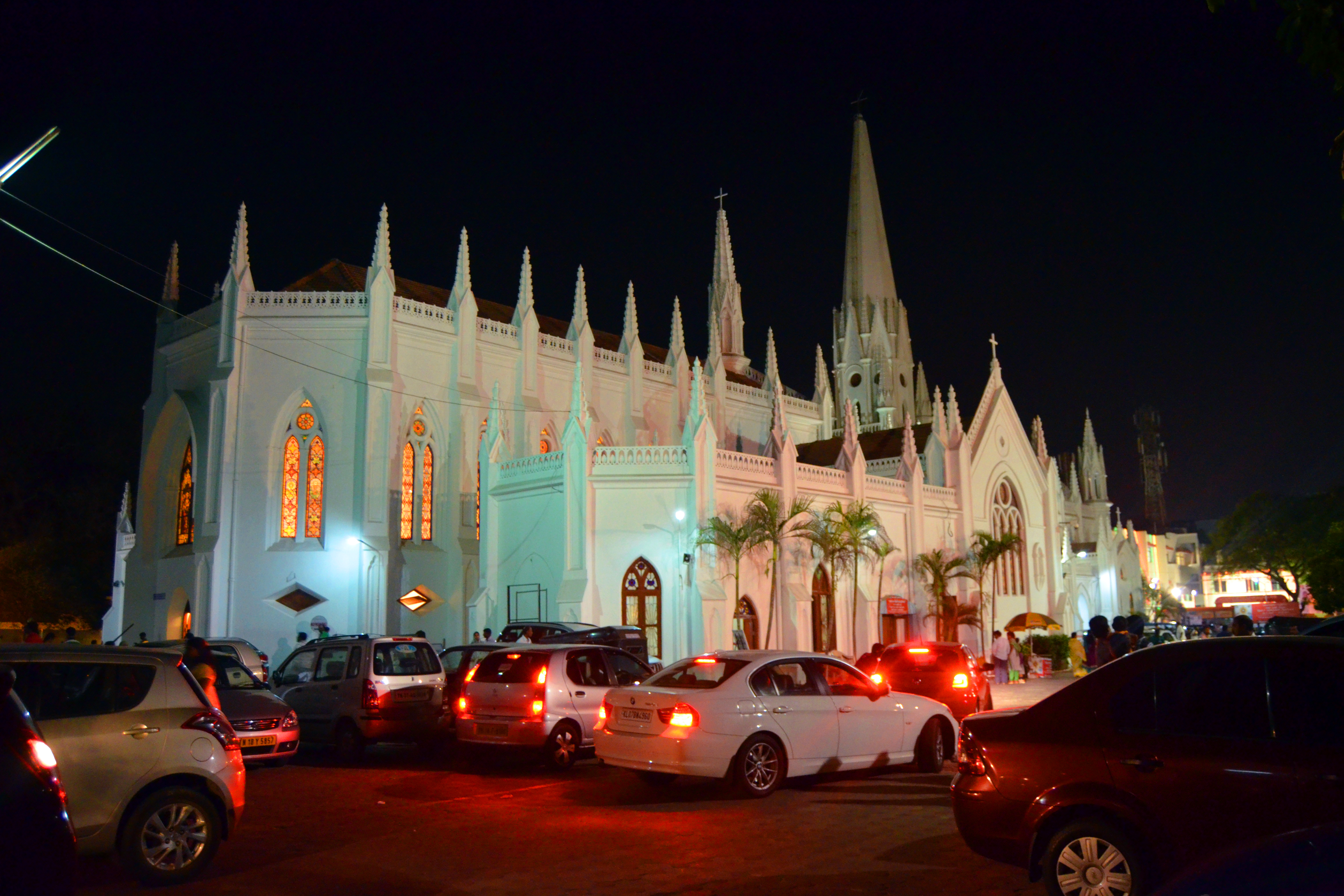
Side view from behind

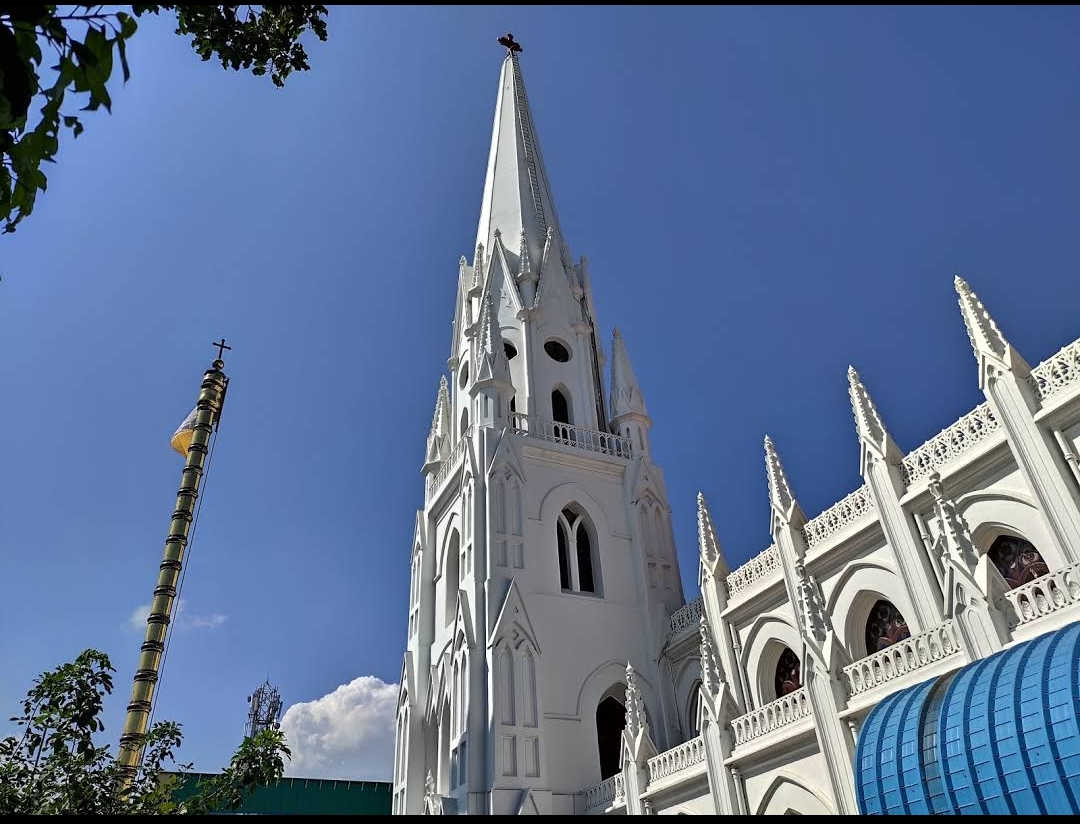
First spire (bell tower)

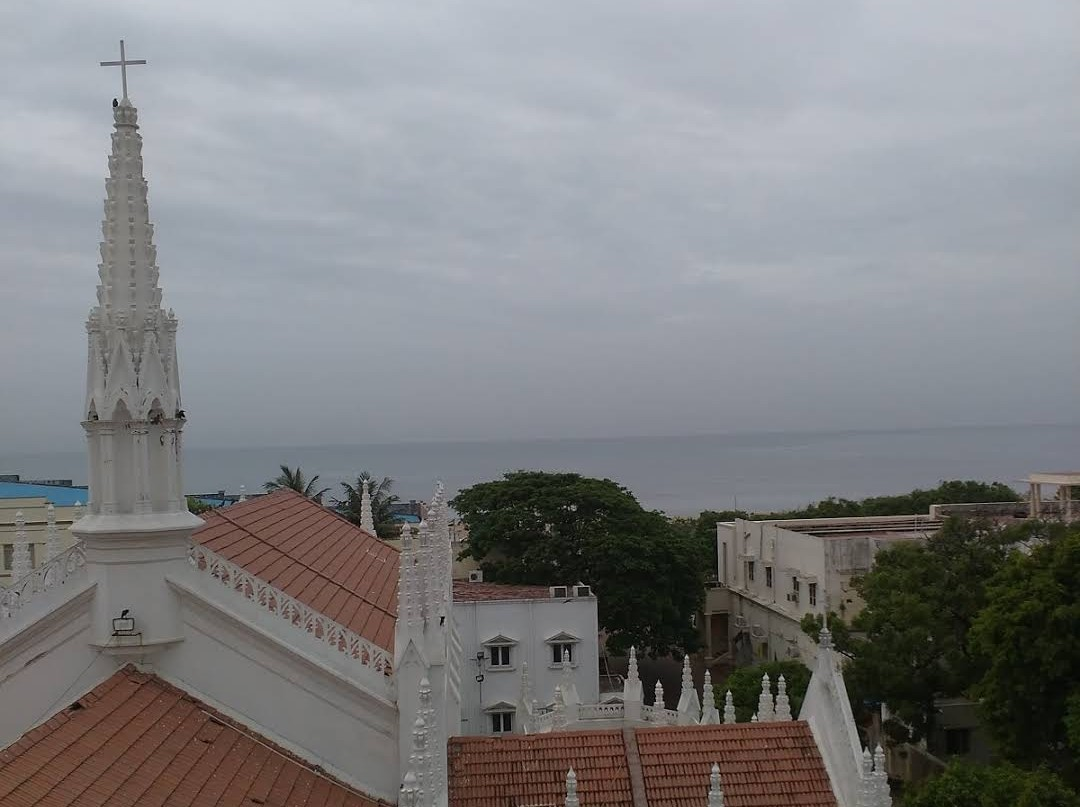
Second Spire

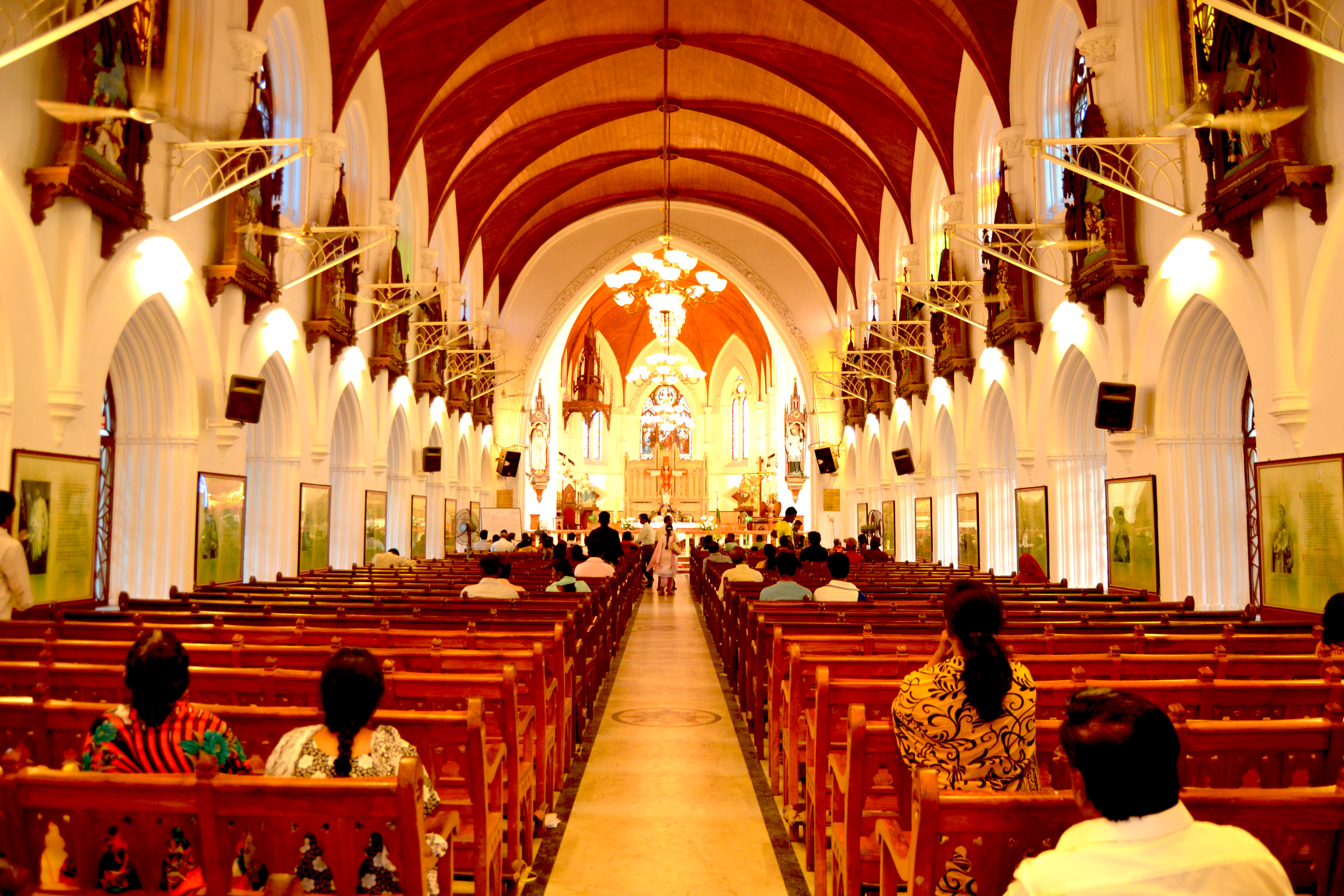
Cathedral interior

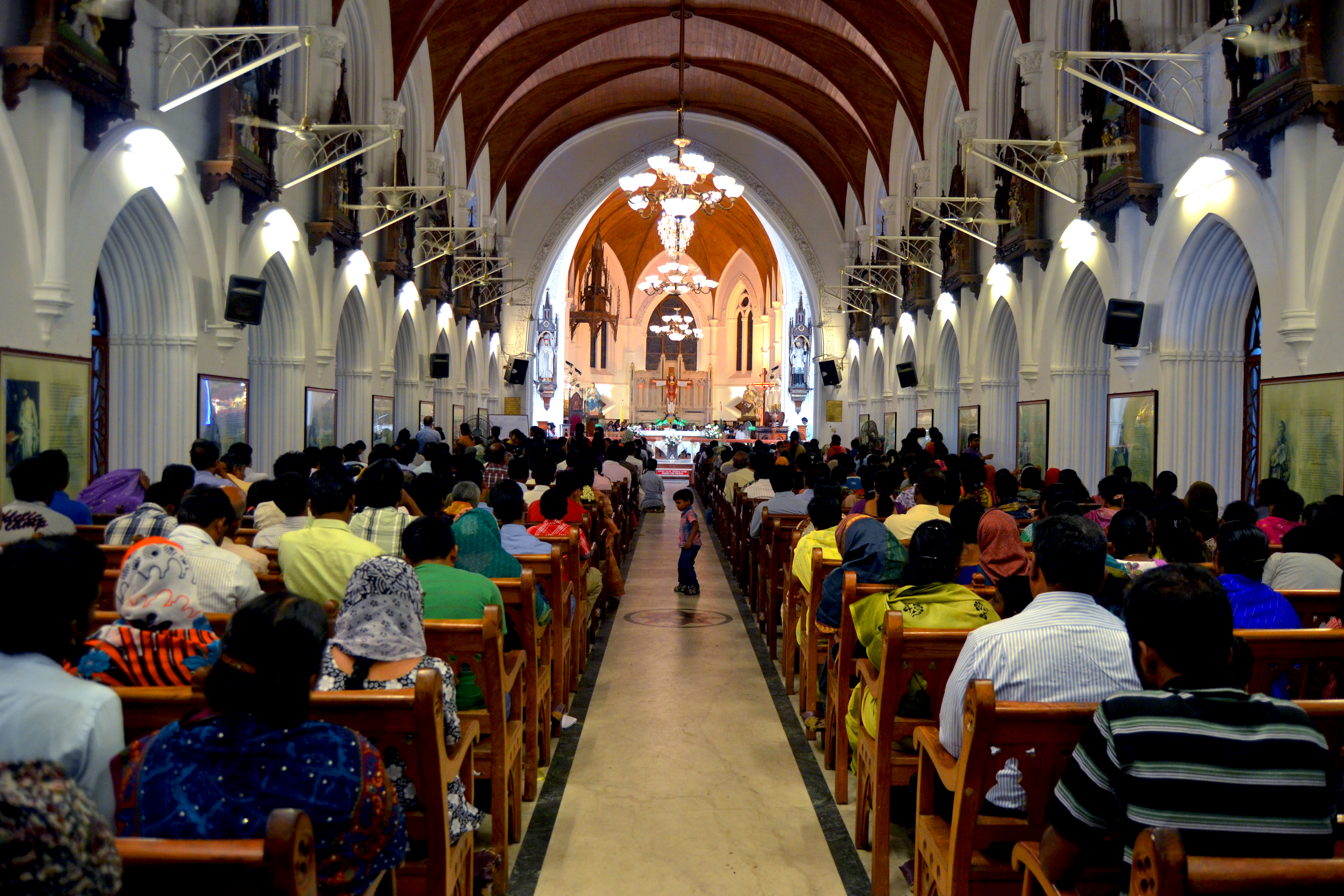
Evening mass

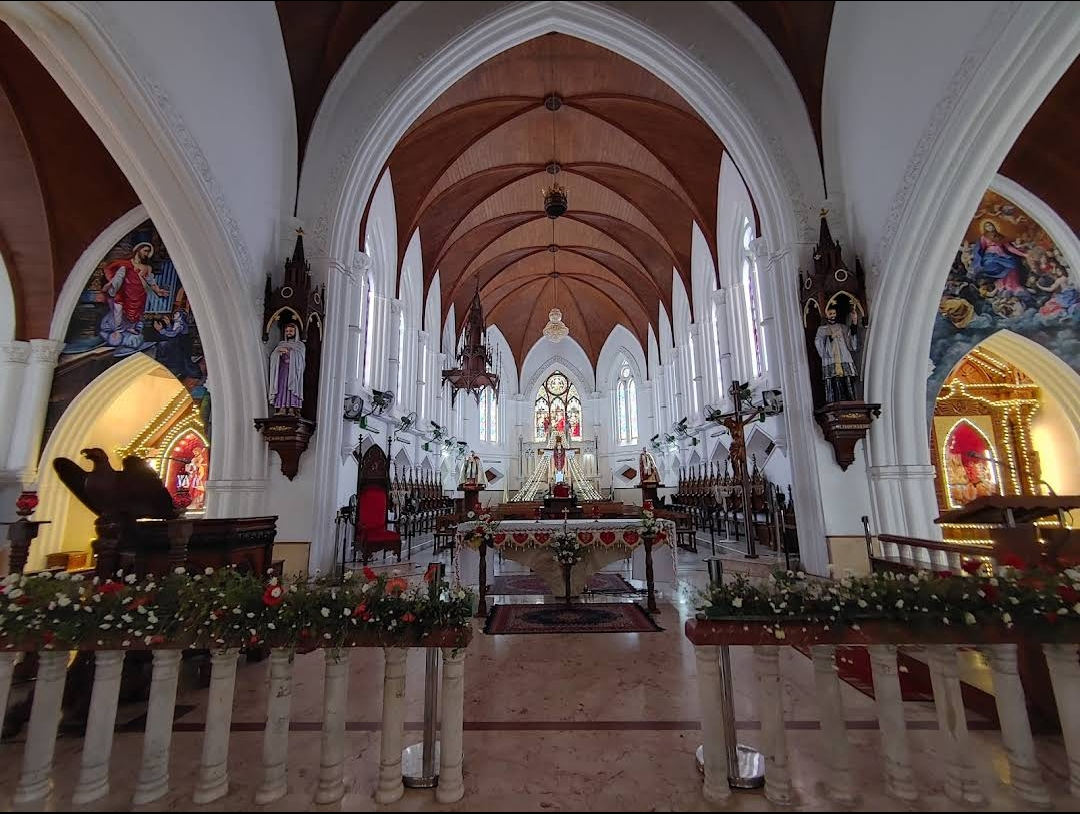
Main altar

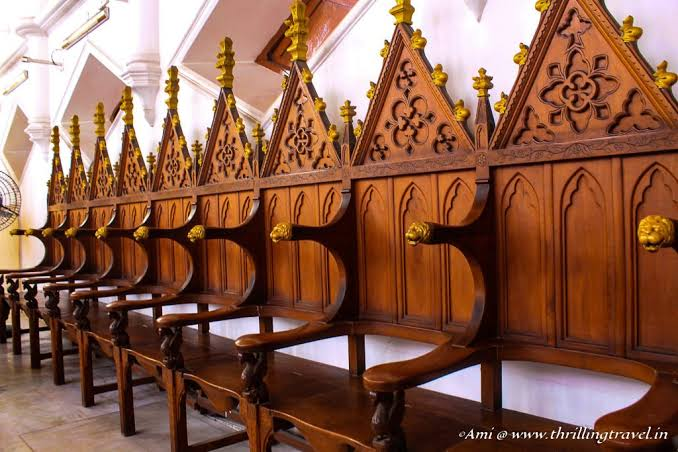
Chairs

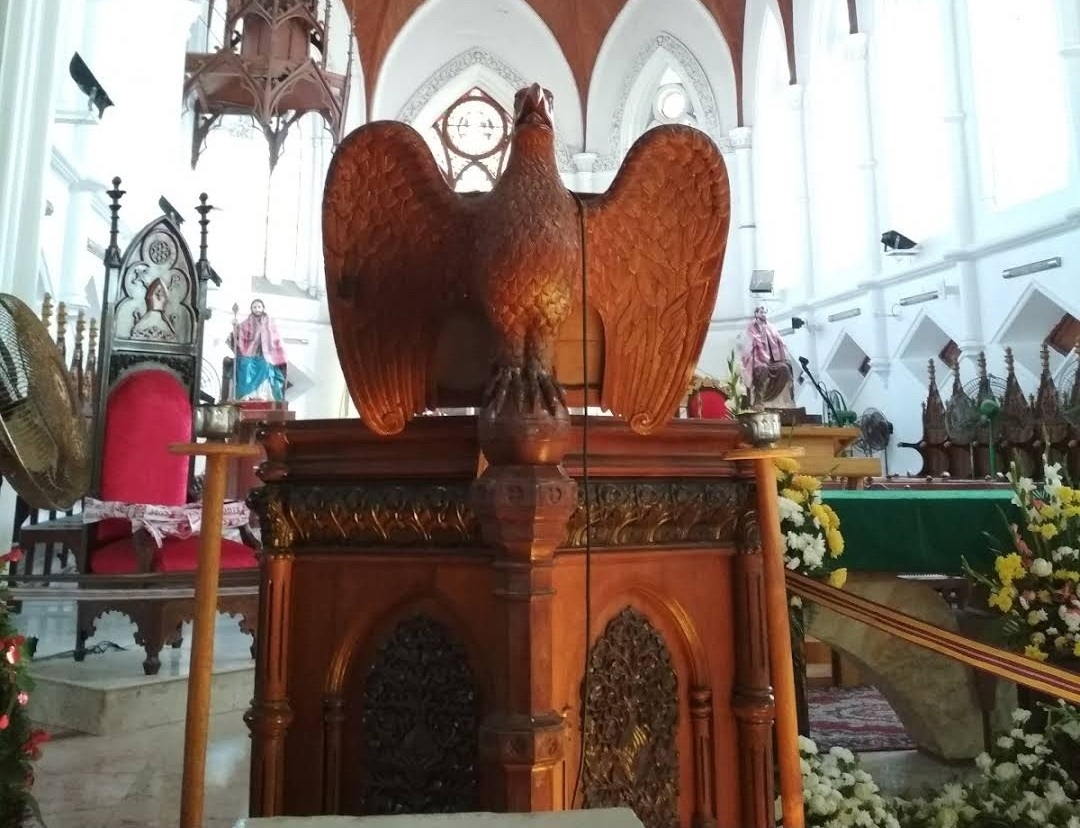
Eagle pulpit

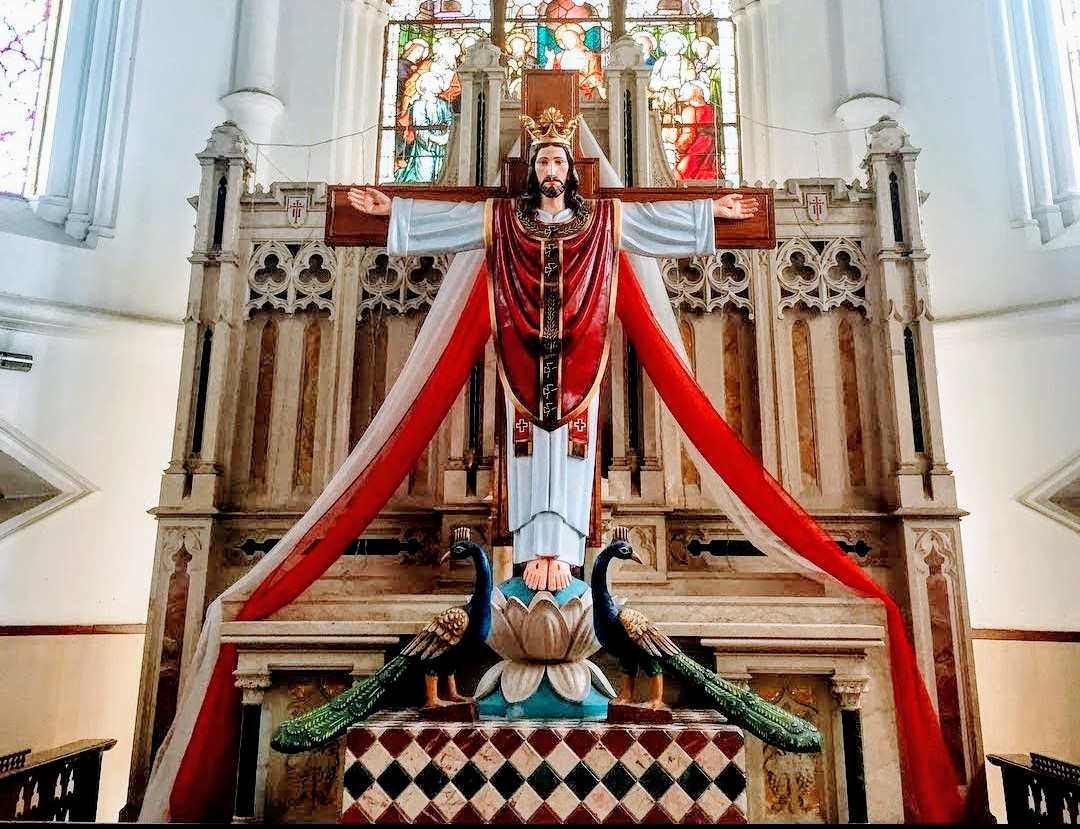
High altar statue of Jesus

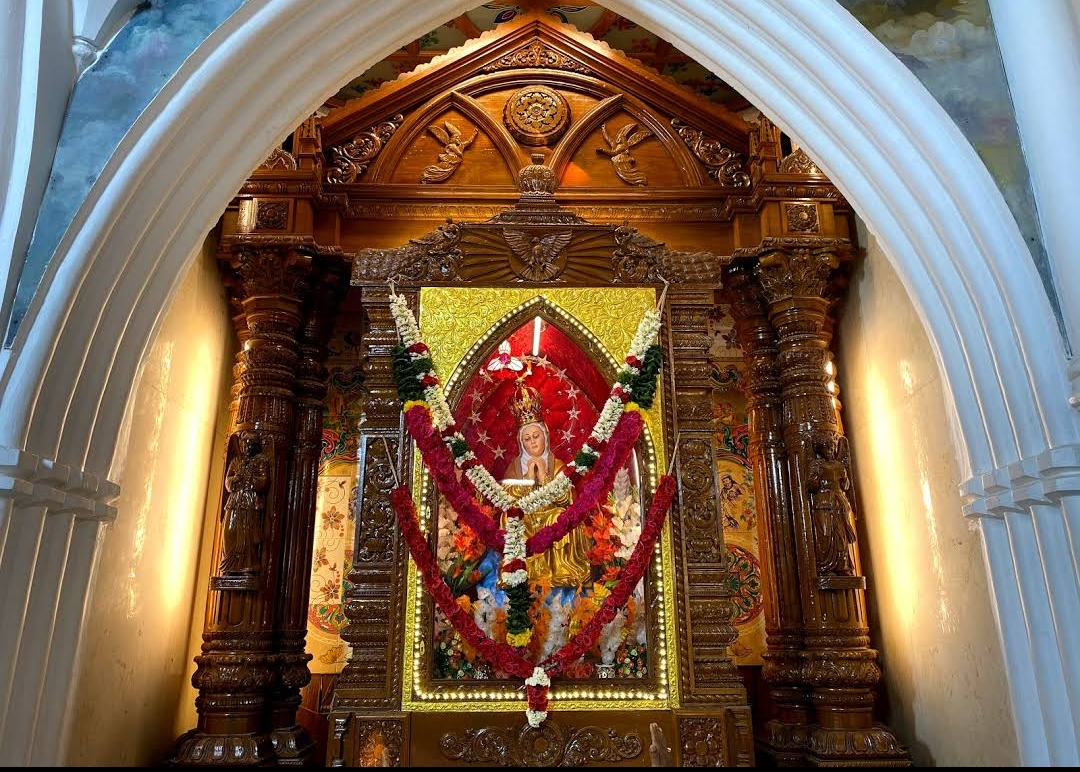
Statue of Our Lady of Mylapore

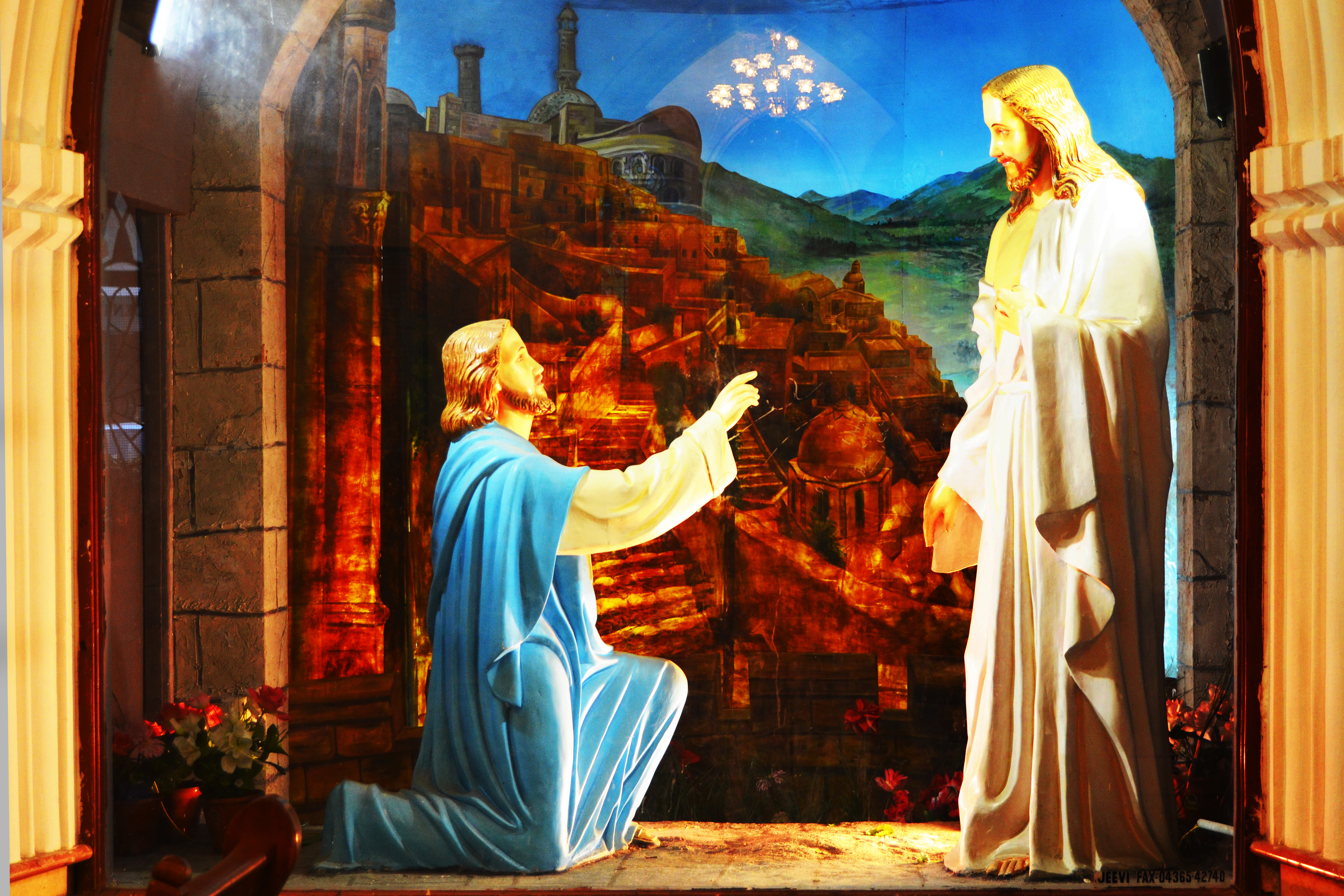
Thomas and Jesus

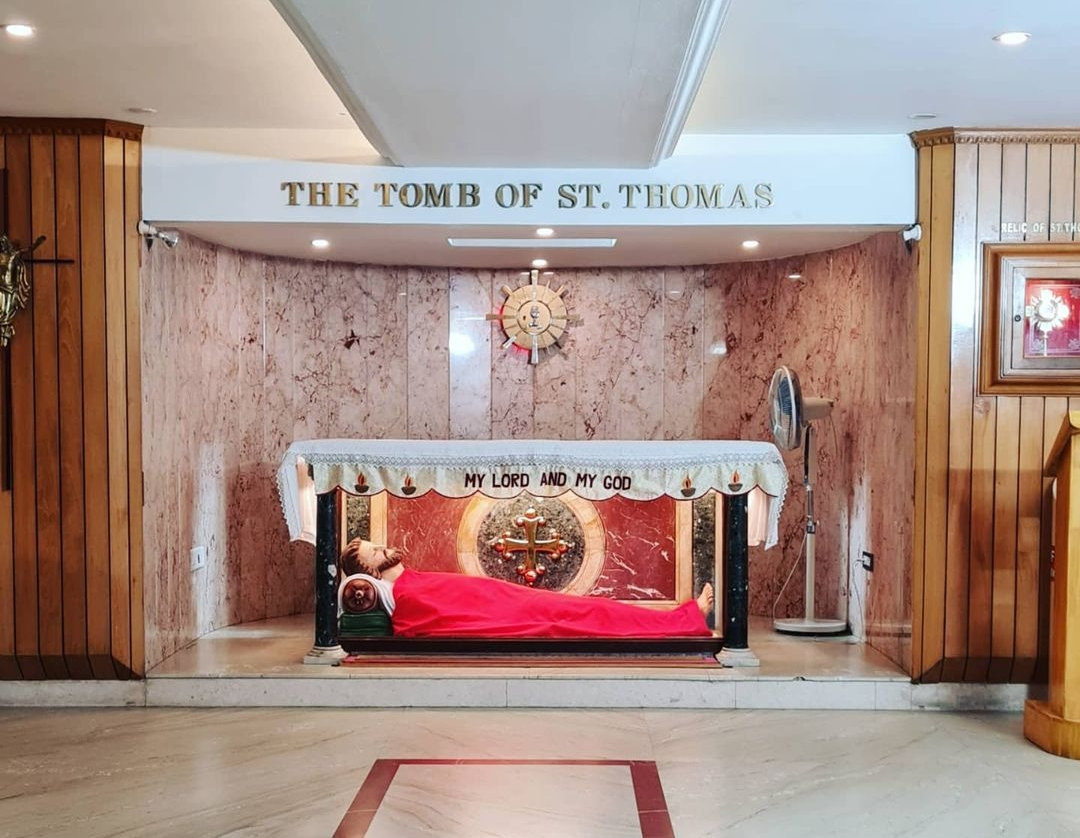
Tomb of Thomas the Apostle

=== Stained glass ===
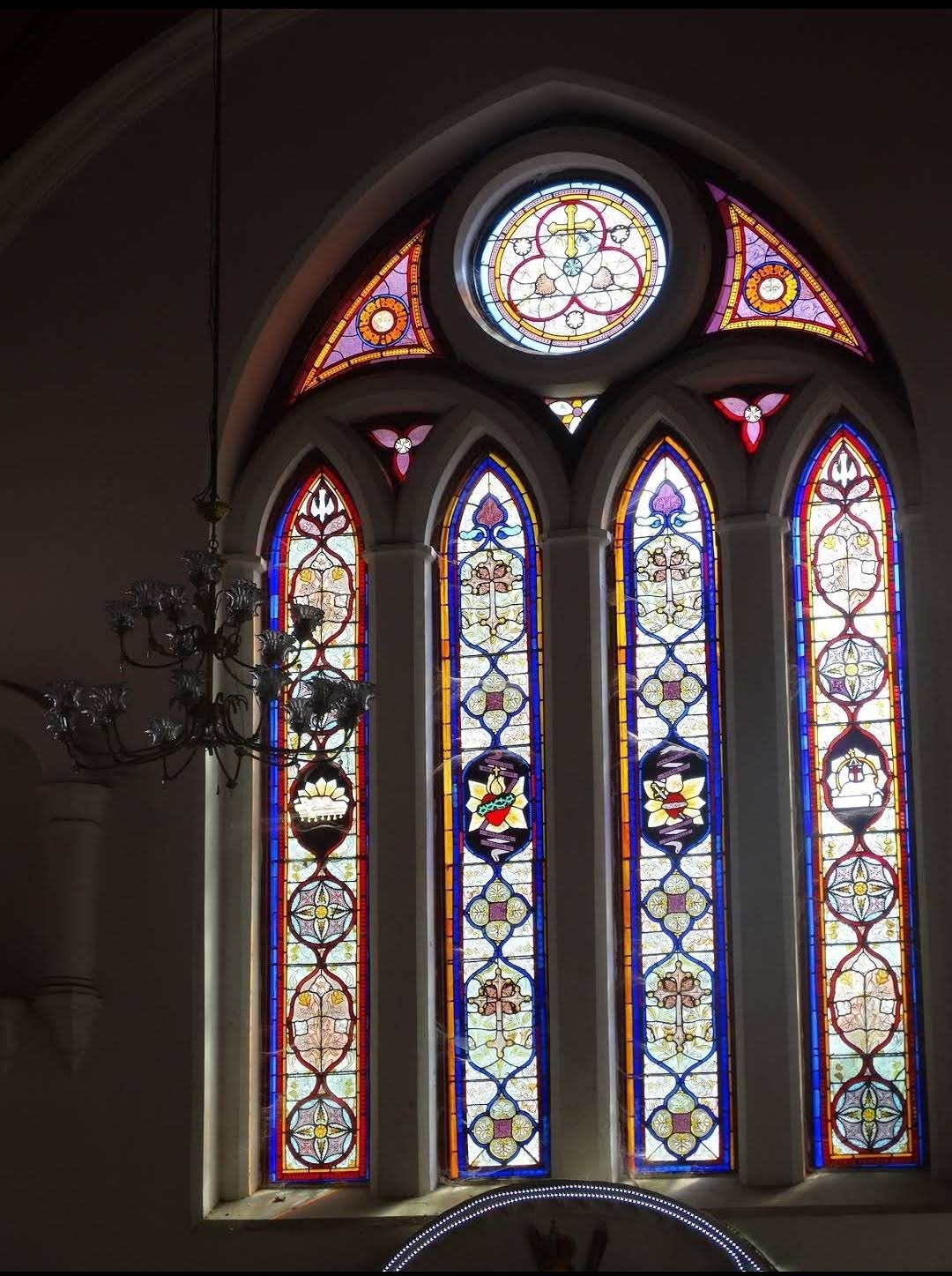
Left wing

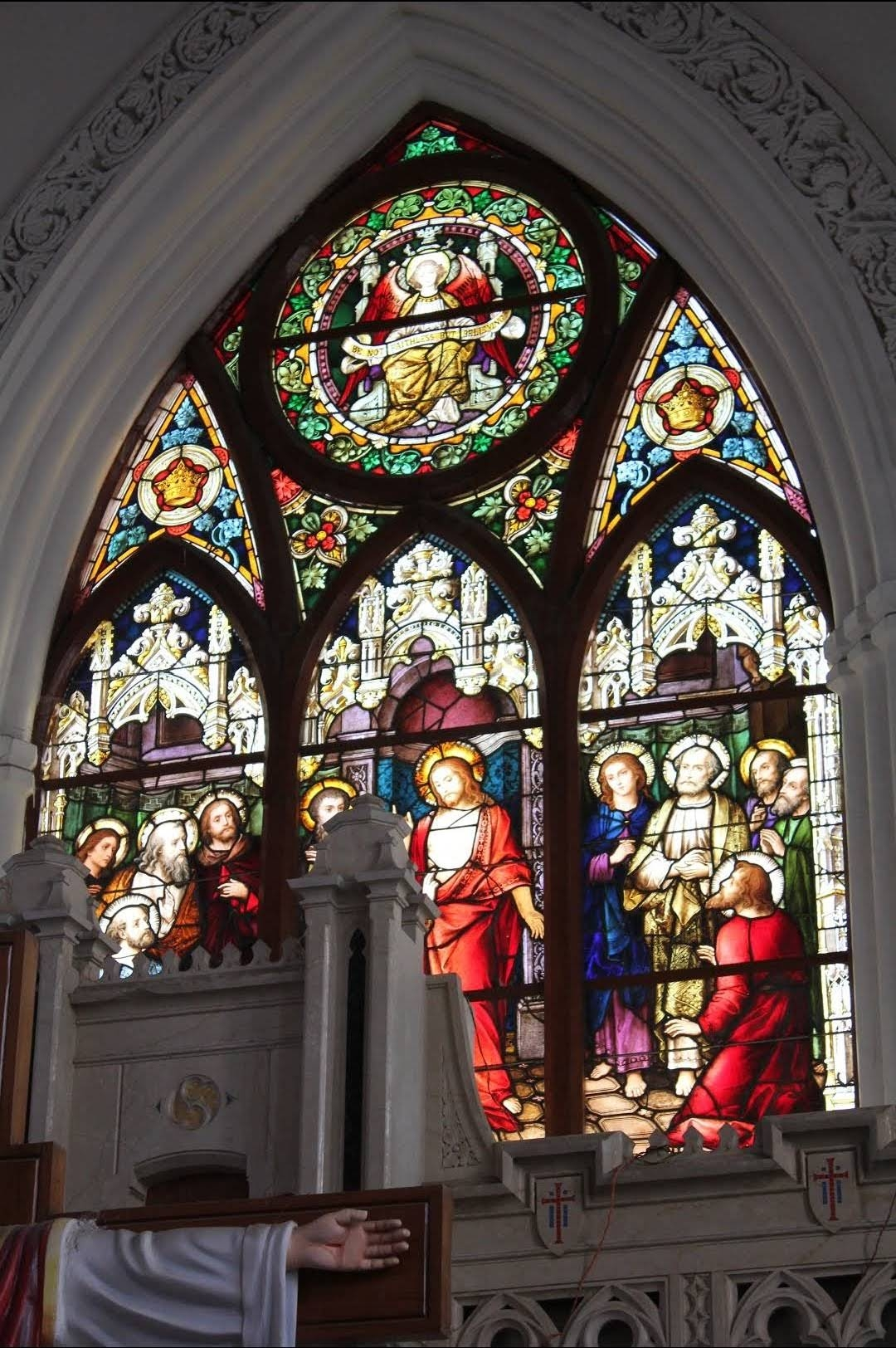
Main altar

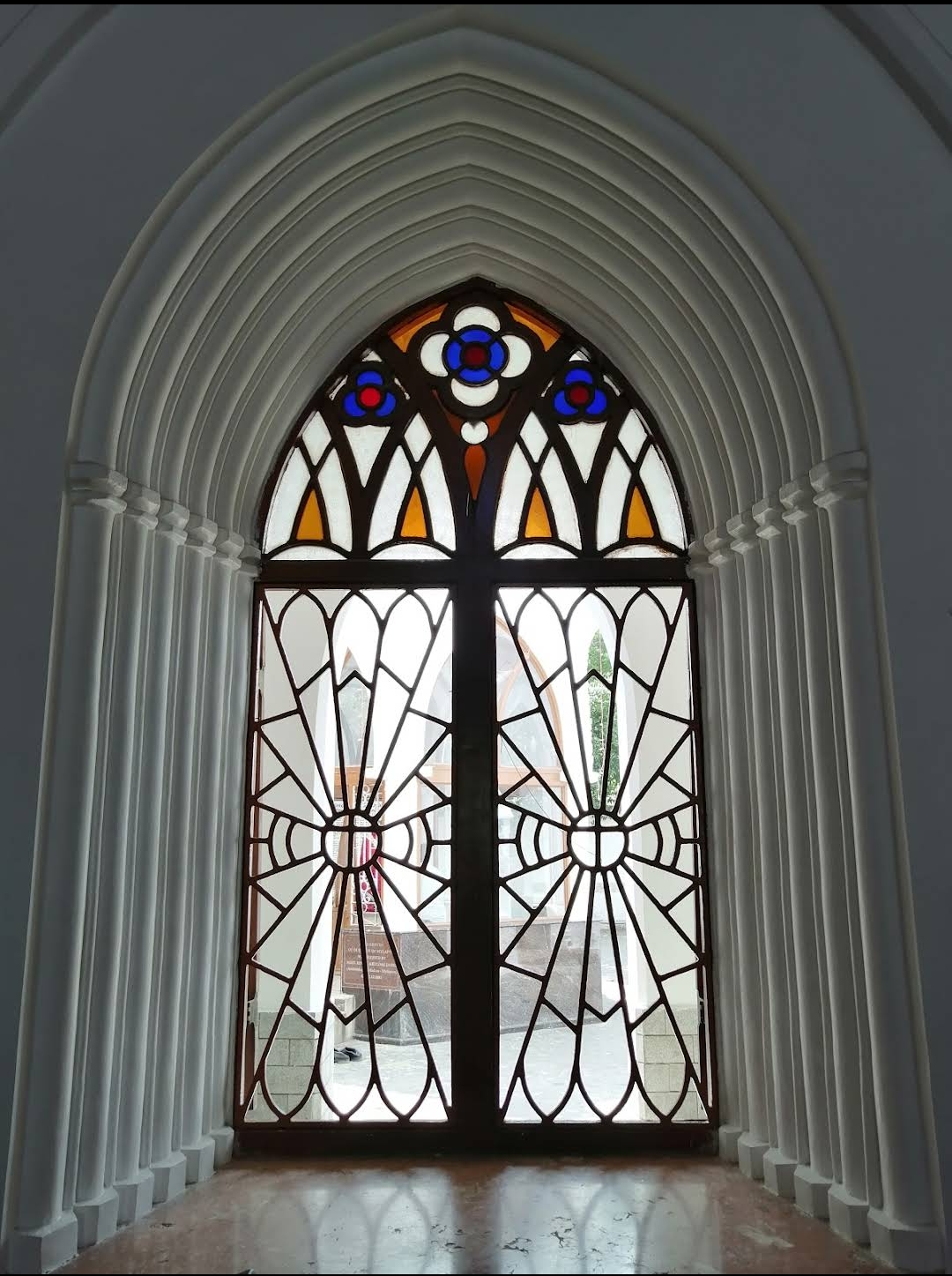
Lower window

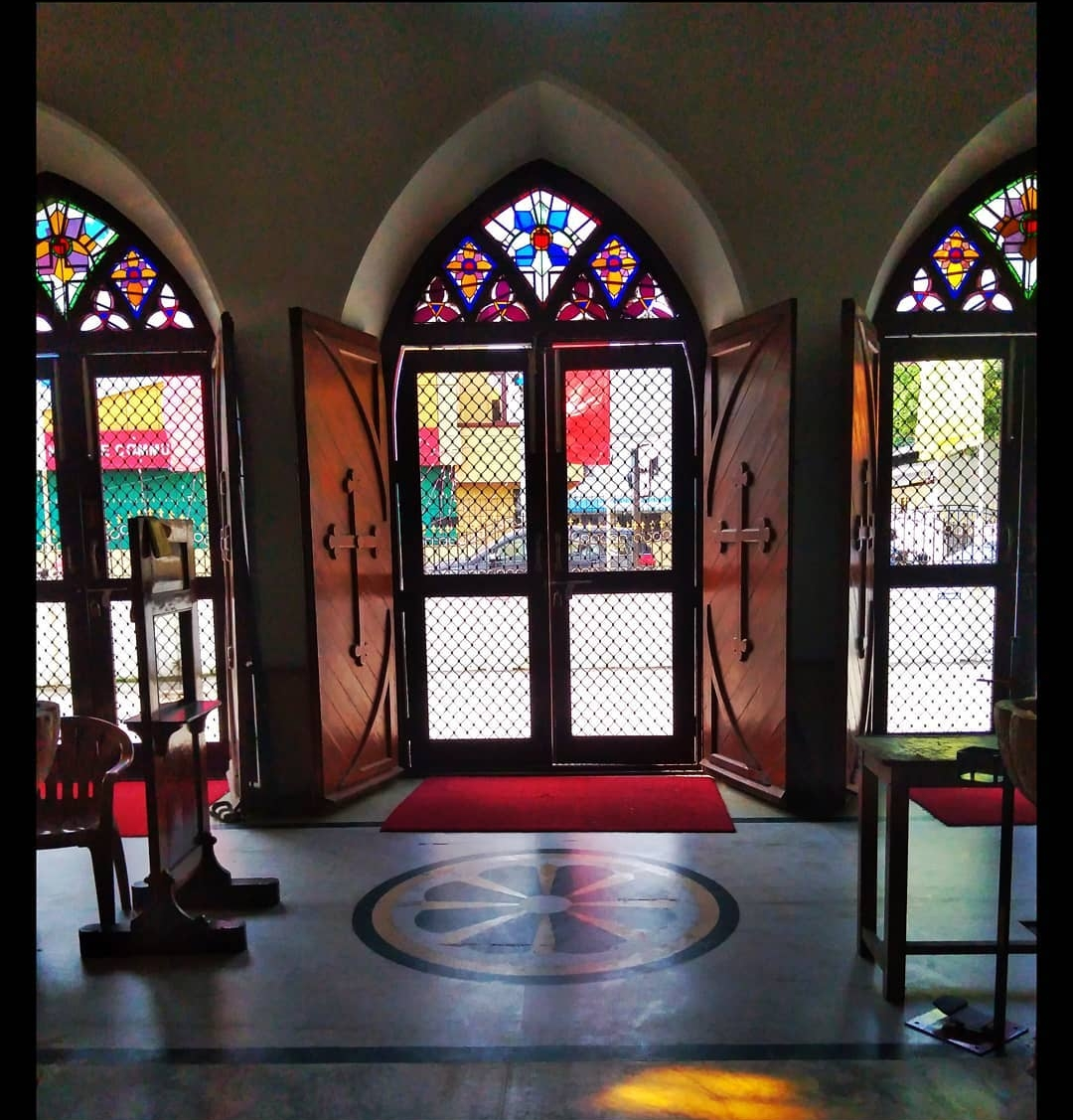
Main entrance

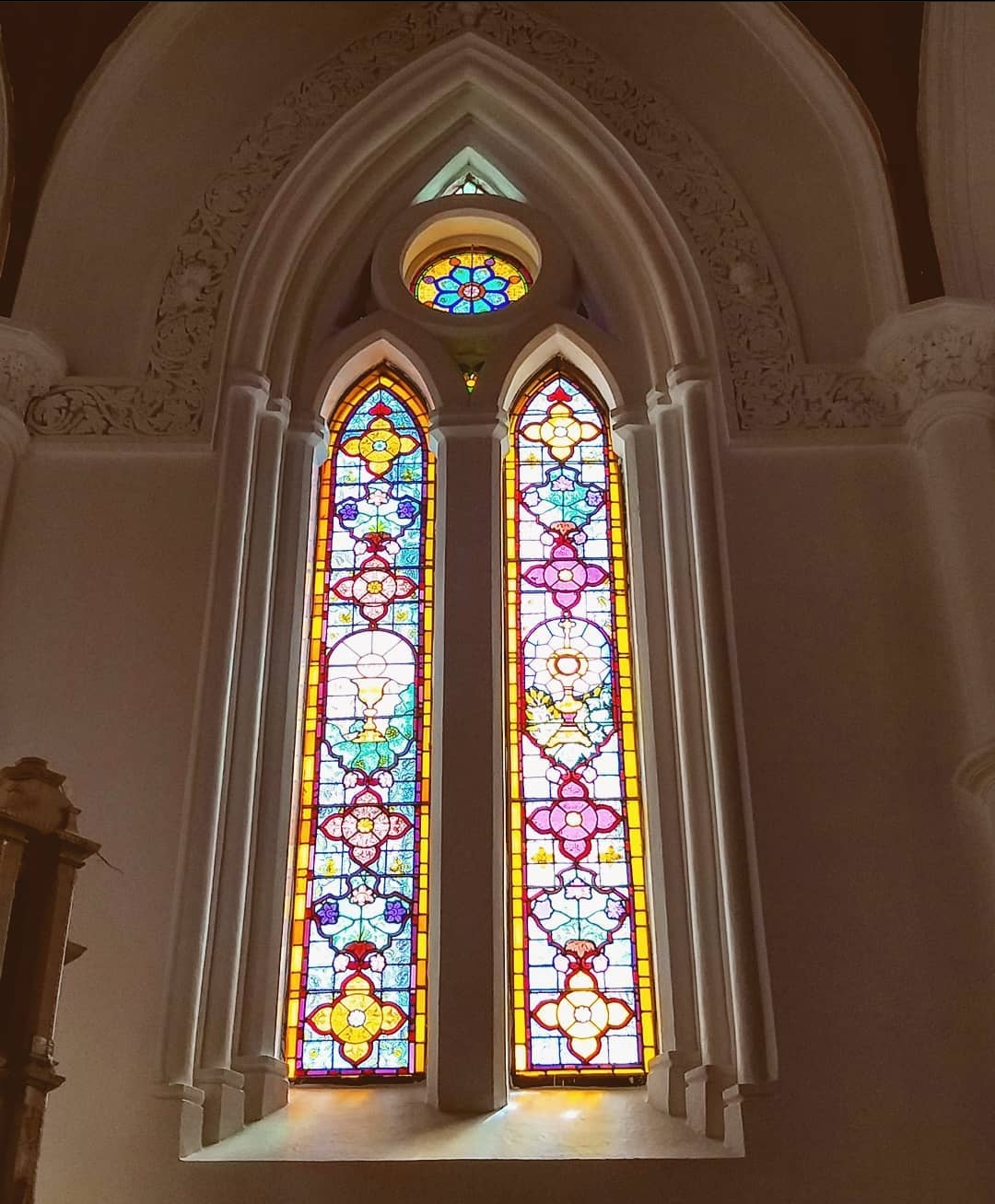
Upper window, main altar

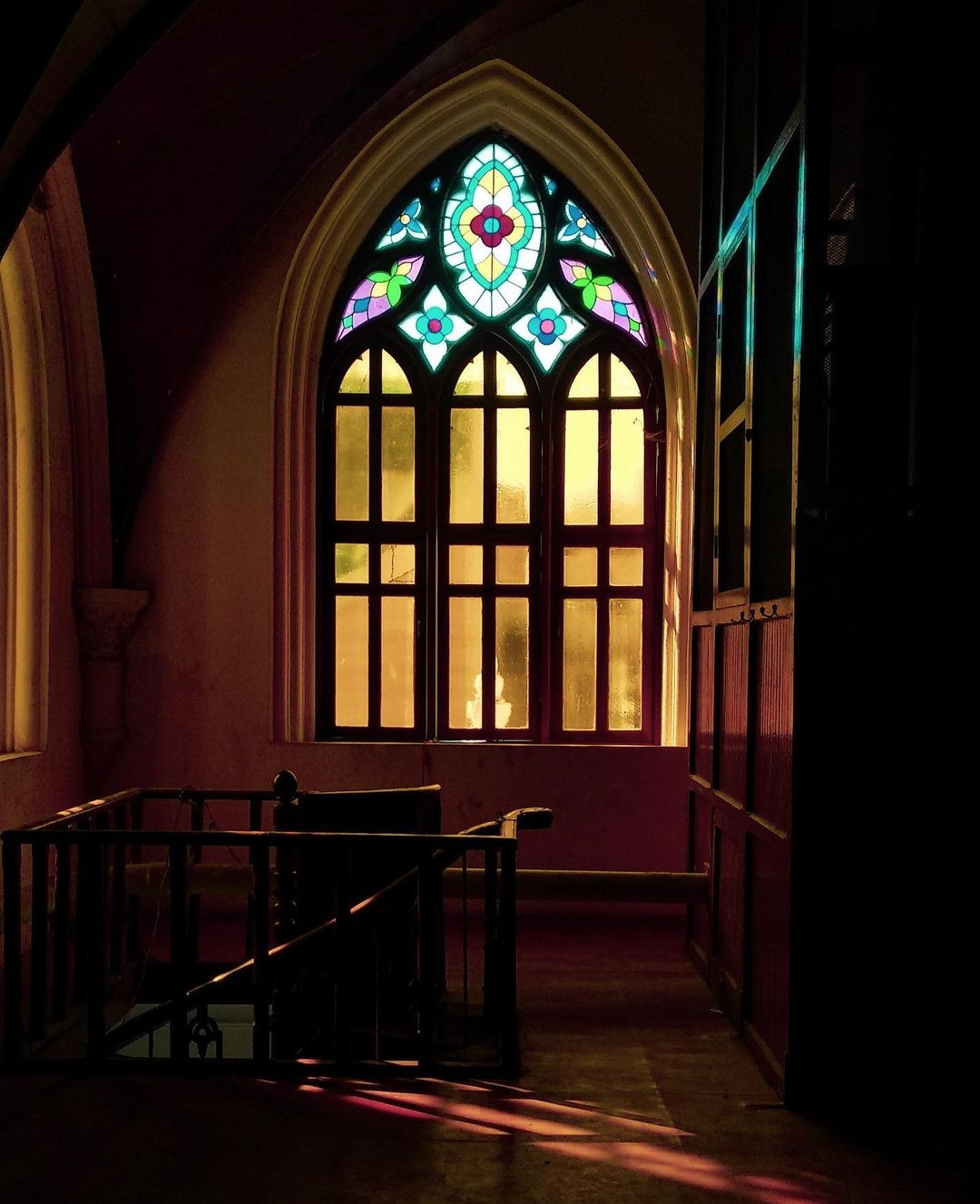
Upper floor

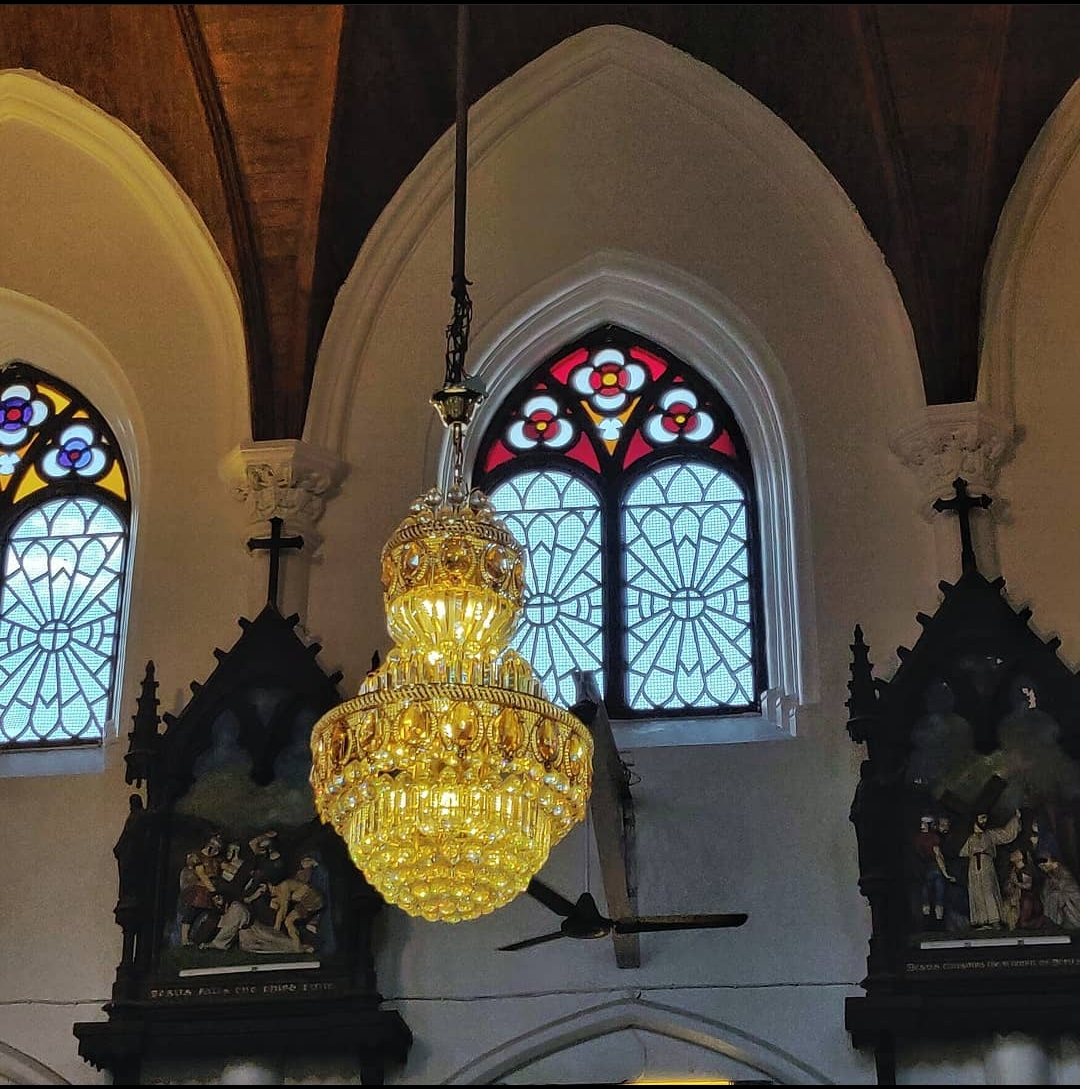

== See also ==
- Roman Catholicism in India
- Saint Thomas of Mylapur
- Basilica of Our Lady of Good Health
- Poondi Matha Basilica
- Our Lady of Snows Basilica
- Christianity in India
- Christianity in Tamil Nadu
- List of churches in Chennai
- St. Thomas Mount
- Santhome
