= Santhome =

Santhome Saint Thomas
- Neighbourhood
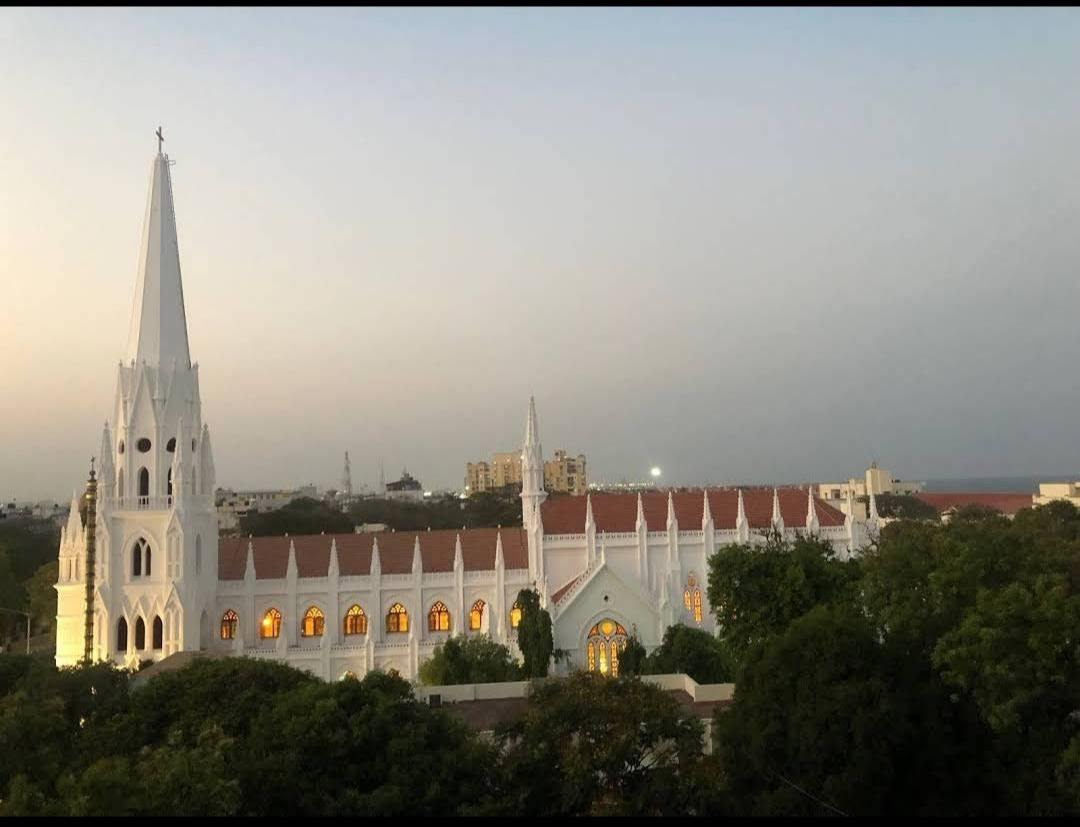
- San Thome Basilica

- Location within Chennai Location within Tamil Nadu Location within India
- Coordinates: 13.0302°N 80.2787°E
- Country: India
- State: Tamil Nadu
- District: Chennai District
- Metro: Chennai
- Established: 1500
- Founder: Portuguese explorers
- Named for: Saint Thomas the Apostle

Government
  - Body: CMDA

Languages
  - Official: Tamil
- Time zone: UTC+5:30 (IST)
- PIN: 600004
- Planning agency: CMDA
- Website: www.chennai.tn.nic.in

Santhome, also written San Thome, is a locality in Mylapore in Chennai city (formerly Madras) in India. It was a Portuguese settlement in the 16th century.

== History ==
The word Santhome or San Thome is derived from Saint Thomas. The tradition is that he was martyred in AD 72 at St.Thomas Mount in the city, and was interred in Mylapore. Later a church was built over his supposed tomb and today is known as the San Thome Basilica.

The Basilica is one of the three churches that claim to have been built over the tomb of an apostle. (Others include St. Peter's Basilica in Rome, Italy; the Church of Saint James the Great in Santiago de Compostela, Spain.)

== St. Thomas Tomb ==
After Thomas the Apostle was said to have landed in Calicut and preached about Jesus in Kerala, he came to Chennai and preached about Jesus and was killed in AD 72 in St. Thomas Mount and possibly buried in Mylapore (presently Santhome). And as History a small and simple structure (church) was built over the tomb of Saint Thomas the Apostle by his disciples in AD 72. In AD 1521 the tomb was renovated by Portuguese missionaries who built a church over the tomb. After the tomb of Saint Thomas the apostle was renovated the relic of Apostle was firstly shown in the church. The body of the Apostle was taken into the town under grand procession in Santhome and Mylapore and again buried in the center of Santhome Church, in 1523 after the church was opened. In 1545 Saint Francis Xavier visited the church and stayed for nearly 11 months. He often prayed in the tomb and celebrated Eucharist Mass in the main church. In 1729 the tomb was first opened to the public.

== Santhome Church ==
The Portuguese explorers came to Mylapore in 1500, they saw the tomb of St. Thomas as a small abandoned structure and they decided to build a church in that same place. In 1522 they started building the church under orders of King John III of Portugal and opened it in 1523. They named the east coast of Mylapore as Santhome where the church is located. In 1893 British decided to rebuild the church with the status of Cathedral and opened in 1896. Later on the church became Basilica and National Shrine of India. And also referred to be "International Shrine". It is a very important church in the world and most visited site in Chennai.

Today it is known as "National Shrine of St. Thomas Cathedral Basilica" or "Santhome Church" built over the holy tomb of Saint Thomas the Apostle. The glory and dignity of St. Thomas shown in this Cathedral Basilica Church.

== Battle of St Thomé ==
During the First Carnatic War (1744/1746–1748), after the French captured Fort St George from the British, the Nawab of the Carnatic, Anwaruddin Muhammed Khan, expected the town to be handed over to him as overlord. Anwaruddin responded by sending a 10,000 man army under Mahfuz Khan, his son, to take the fort from Dupleix by force forcing him to move south. Khan seized Santhome and formed a battle line on the north bank of the Adyar River on 22 October to prevent the French from moving up reinforcements from Pondicherry.

When Kahn's forces approached the walls however, the garrison's gunnery compelled them to retire. French Governor-General Joseph François Dupleix sent a relief force from Pondicherry that met Khan's army at the Adyar River. Although the French had only 300 troops, in the Battle of Adyar they executed a bold attack that drove the Nawab's forces into the town. The French then expelled them and forced them to retreat towards Arcot. By this action the French ceased being suppliants to the local ruler.

== Santhome now ==
Santhome has some premier educational institutions. Hence, it became an administrative capital locality of the Archdiocese of Madras-Mylapore. These include Rosary Matriculation School, St. Bedes A. I. Hr. Sec. School, Santhome Higher Secondary school, St. Raphel's School and Dominic Savio Matric. School. The official residence of the Archbishop of the Madras - Mylapore Archdiocese is in Santhome adjacent to the Basilica. The consulates of Russia and Spain are also in this area. The Santhome High Road stretches from the light house side of the famous Marina beach and goes through in front of St. Thomas basilica towards Adyar.

== Gallery ==
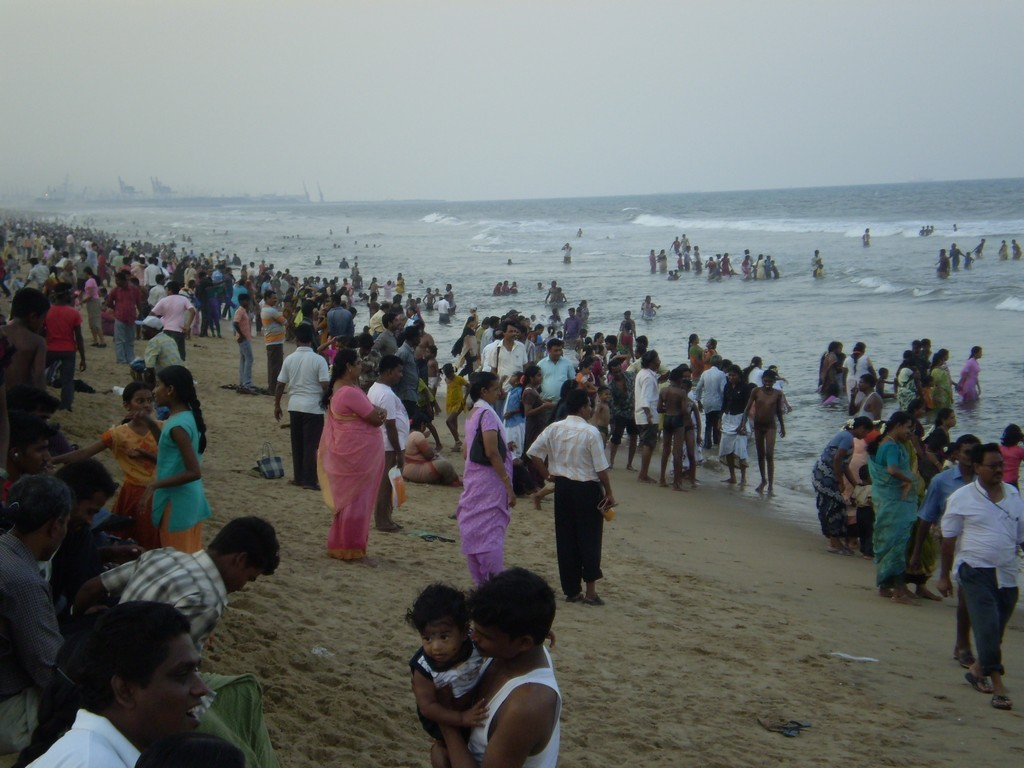
Santhome beach crowded with people

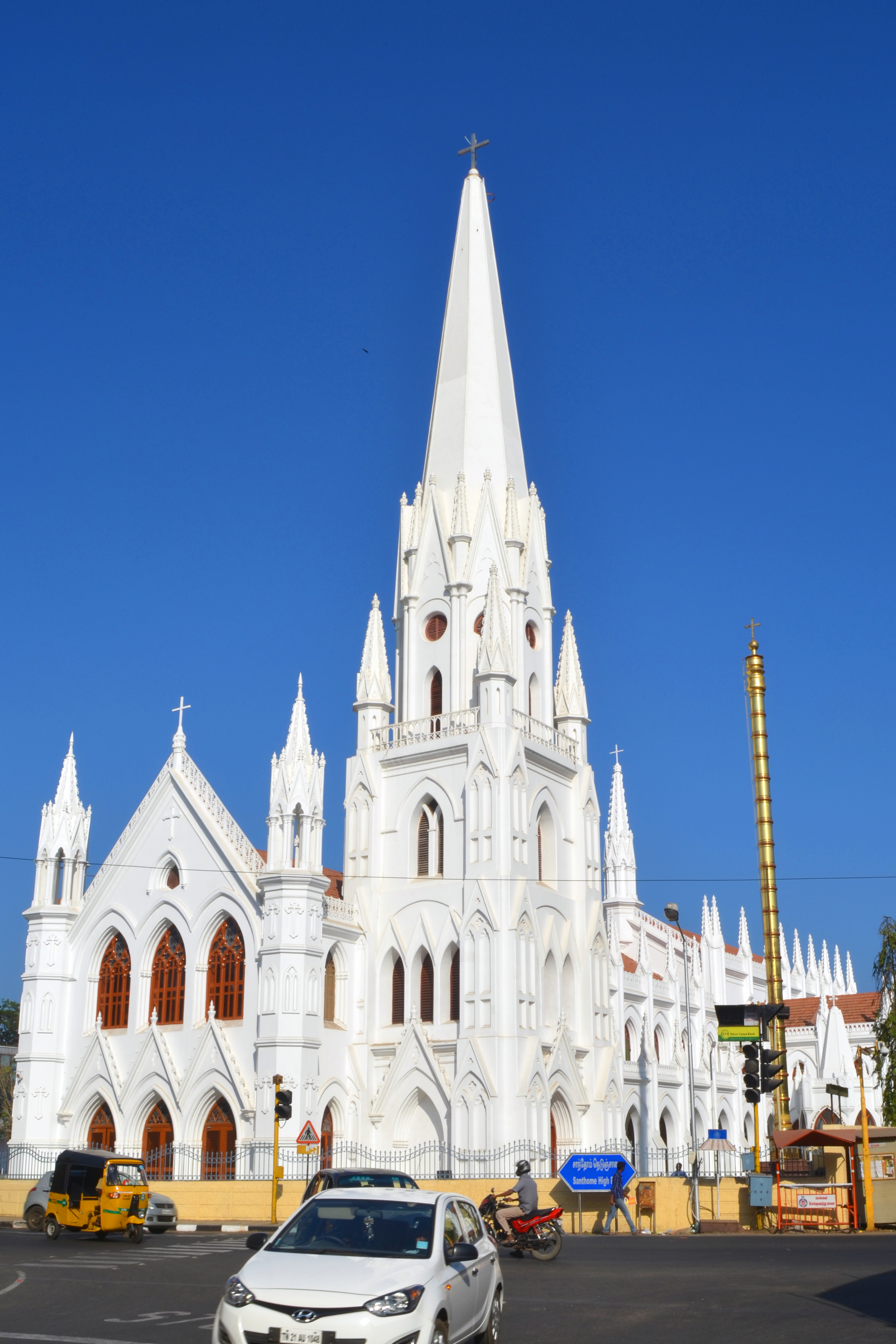
Santhome Cathedral Basilica

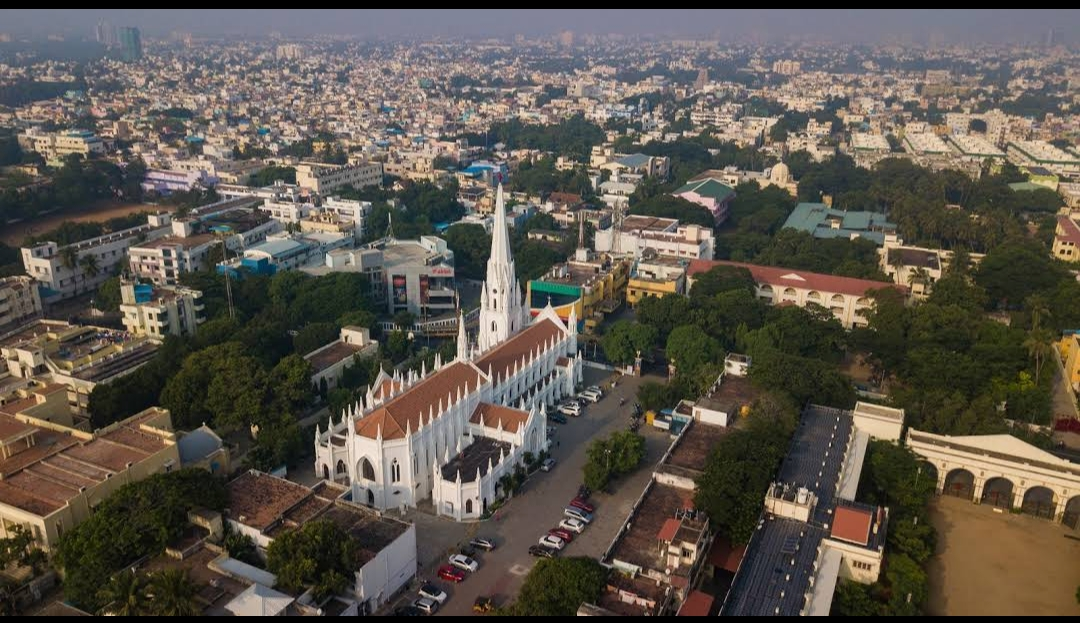
Santhome aerial view

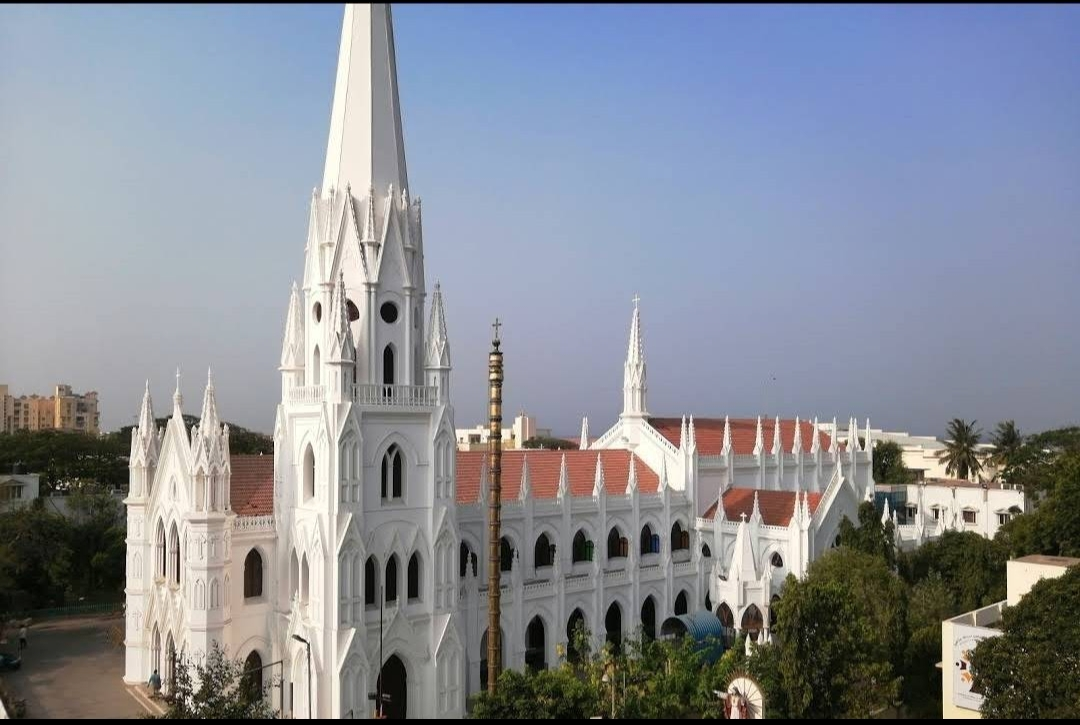
Santhome church

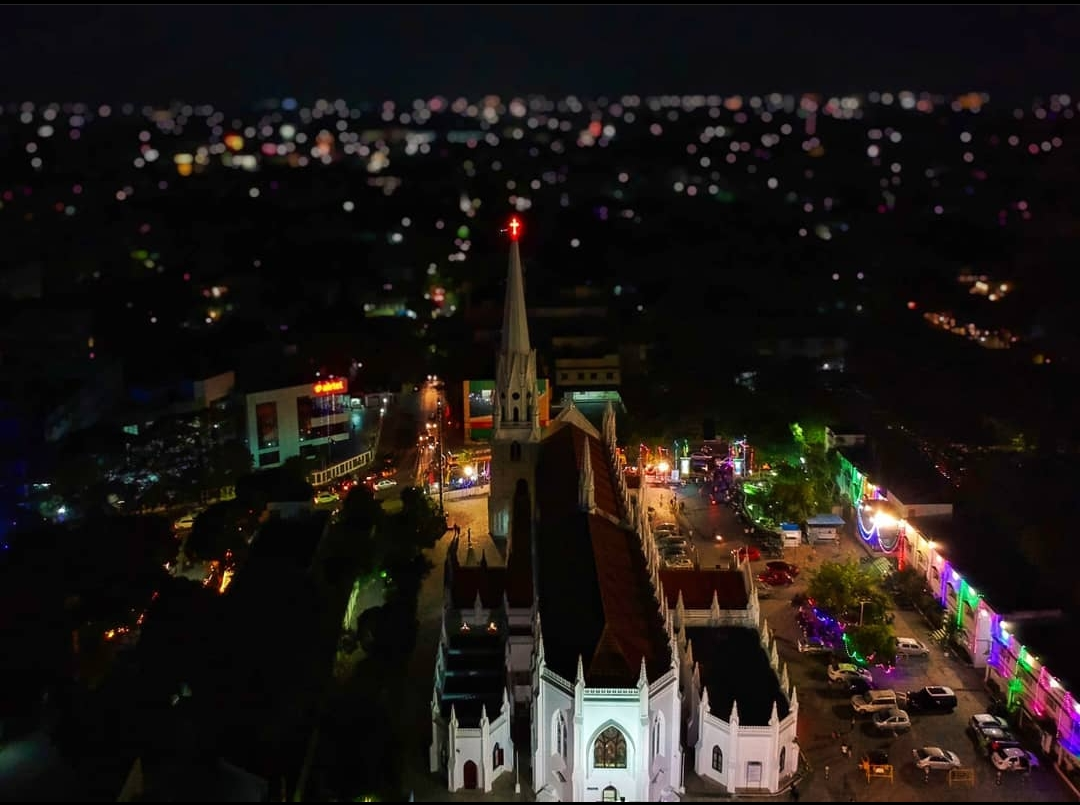
Santhome Church Aerial view from back side

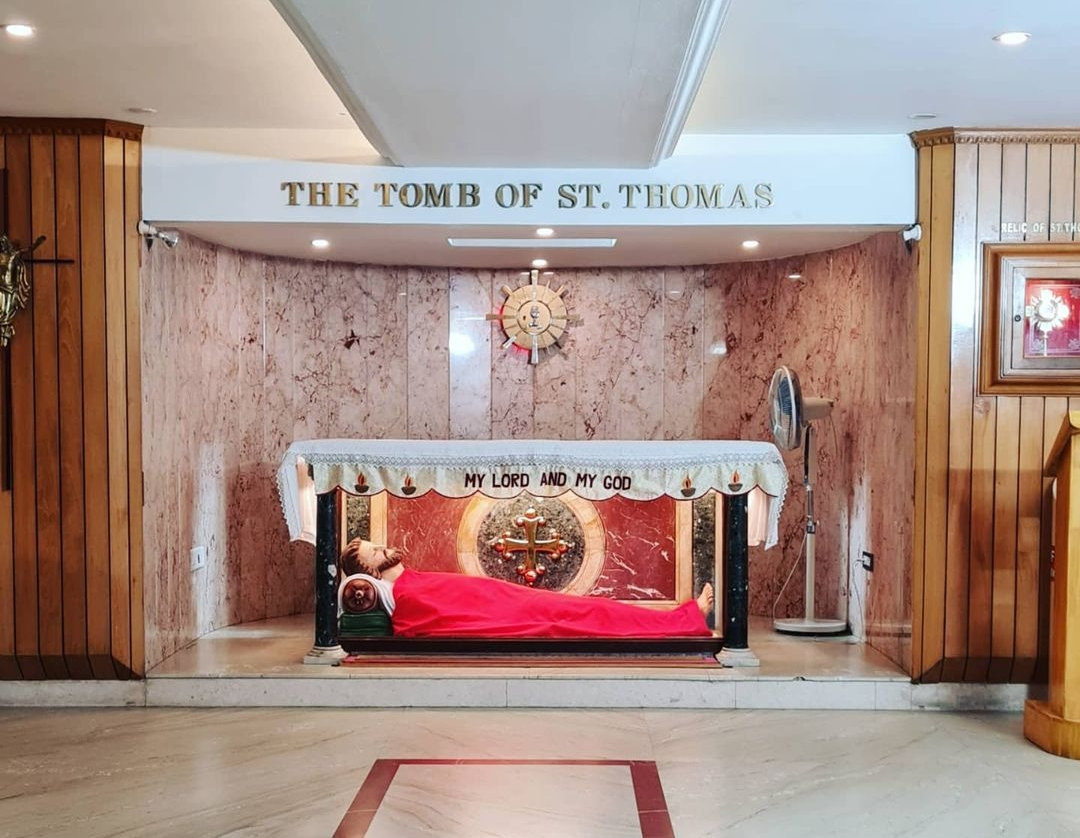
Saint Thomas Tomb located in Santhome Church

== See also ==
- San Thome Basilica
