= Zion Church, Chintadripet =

Zion Church
- Location within Chennai
- 13°04′30.7″N 80°16′18.9″E
- Location: Chintadripet, Chennai
- Country: India
- Denomination: Church of South India
- Website: www.csizionchurch.com

History
- Founded: 1847

Architecture
- Functional status: Active
- Architectural type: Chapel
- Style: Gothic architecture

Administration
- Archdiocese: Diocese of Madras of the Church of South India

Zion Church is one of the oldest churches in Chintadripet area of Chennai, the capital of the South Indian state of Tamil Nadu. The original structure was built in Gothic architecture in 1847 by US missionaries. The church is the oldest church built by US missionaries in Chennai. The church also has the second oldest bell in the city.

Zion Church is a working church with hourly prayer and daily services and follows Protestant sect of Christianity. The church also celebrates Harvest festival every year during the month of November. In modern times, it is under the dominion of Diocese of Madras of the Church of South India. It is one of the most prominent landmarks of Chintadripet.

== Architecture ==
The church is built in Gothic architecture. The bell in the church is the second oldest church in the city. It was installed during 1878 and was sent by the Christian Missionary Society church. It was restored in 2008. The inscription in the bell indicates that it was built by J Warner & Sons, London. The pipe organ in the church was manufactured during the last decade of the 19th century and installed in the church in 1895. The instrument was not operational for several years and was restored in 2006 with artisans from England.

== History ==
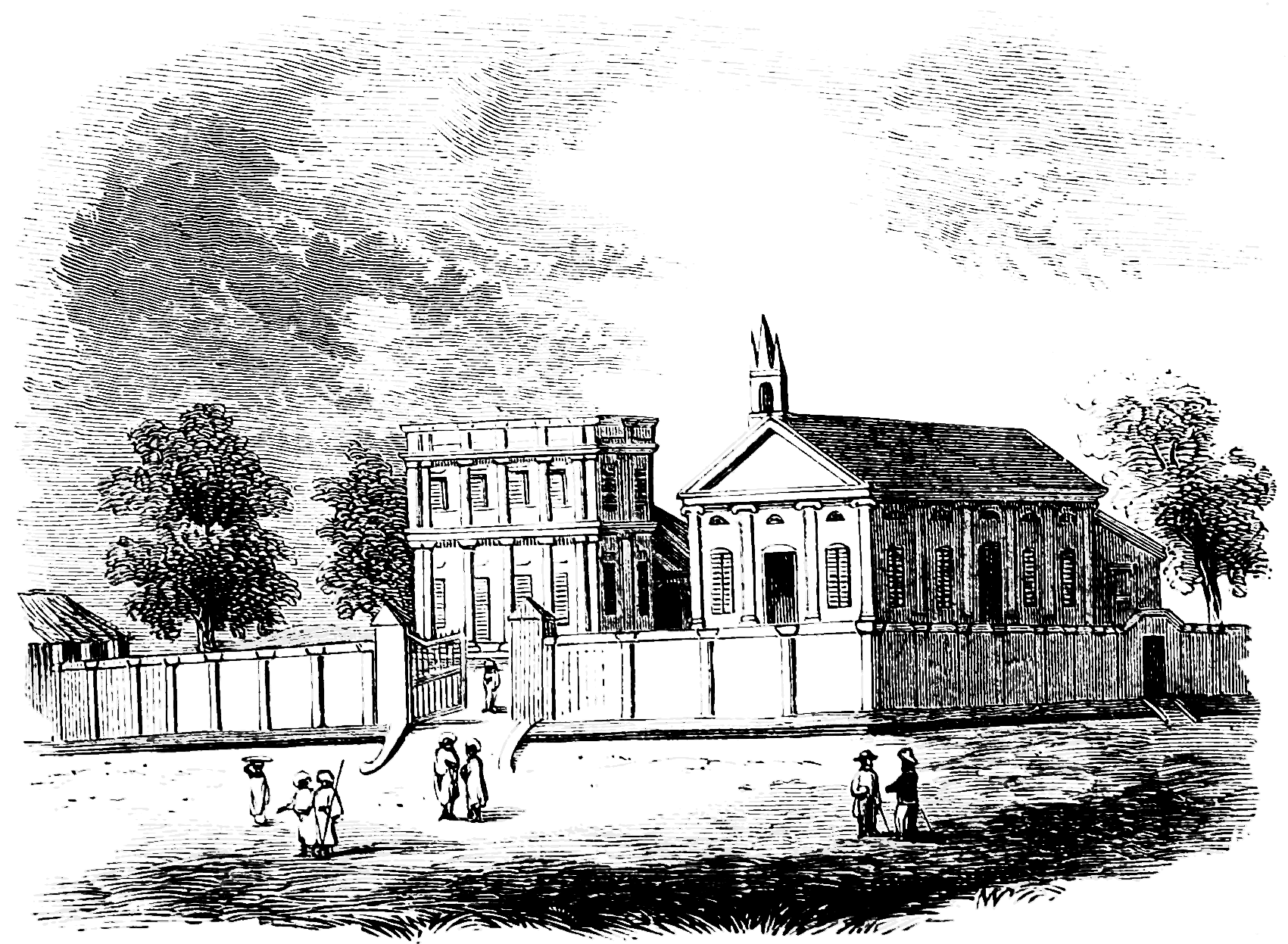
Illustration of the building complex in 1855

As per historian Muthiah, the church is the oldest church built by US missionaries in Chennai and also has the second oldest bell in the city. The church was built as a smaller one by Dr. John Scudder and Rev. Miron Winslow the American missionary returning from Jaffna, Sri Lanka. The church was sold to Church Mission Society of London in 1878 at Rs. 10,000. As per another account, the church was founded in 1734 by governor George Mortin Pith. He is believed to have settled 230 weaver families beside the Cooum river to produce cotton fabric. The church was reconstructed in 2003 at a cost of Rs 50 lakh.

== Worship practises ==
The second pastor of the church was Rev. WT Sathianathan in 1862. The family continued for five generations with WD Clarke, the son-in-law of Sathianathan after 30 years of his service. Clarke was followed by his son Samuel Clarke, who was in turn continued by his son Sundar Clarke. In modern times, the Church is administered by the Diocese of Madras of the Church of South India. Mass is performed in the church from Monday to Friday on 8 a.m., 8:30 a.m. and 5 p.m. on Saturdays and 8:30 a.m. and 6 p.m. on Sundays. The festival of the temple is celebrated during the Christmas times for eight days, starting with flag hoisting on 24 December and ending with a feast and religious lectures.
