= St. Mark's Church, Chennai =

Church in Chennai, India

St. Mark's Church is a Church in the neighbourhood of Madipakkam in Chennai, Tamil Nadu, India.
