= Joseph-Isidore Godelle =

Bishop Joseph-Isidore Godelle M.E.P.
- Vicar Apostolic of Pondicherry; Titular Bishop of Thermopylae
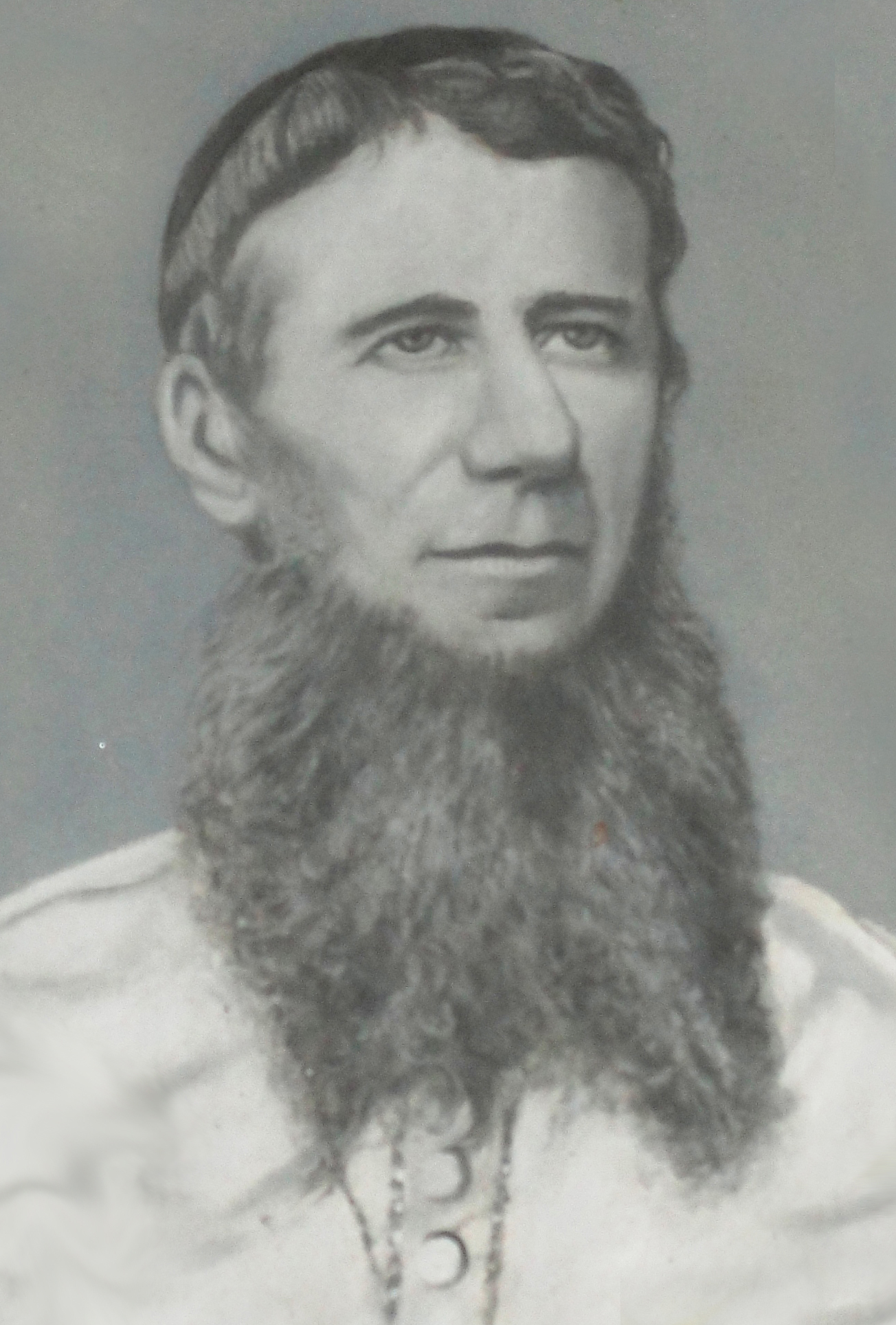
- See: Pondicherry
- Appointed: 3 April 1857
- Installed: 21 March 1861
- Term ended: 15 July 1867
- Predecessor: Clément Bonnand
- Successor: François-Jean-Marie Laouënan

Orders
- Ordination: 1 June 1833
- Consecration: 27 August 1857 by Clément Bonnand

Personal details
- Born: Joseph-Isidore Godelle; 7 March 1806 Hannapes, France
- Died: 15 July 1867 (aged 61) Chambéry, France
- Buried: Chambéry Cemetery
- Denomination: Catholic

Joseph-Isidore Godelle (7 March 1806 – 15 July 1867) was a missionary of Paris Foreign Missions Society and was the vicar apostolic of Pondicherry from 21 March 1861 until his death on 15 July 1867.

He was born in Hannapes, Ardennes on 7 March 1806. After his ordination on 1 June 1833, he served as pastor in Remaucourt, Aisne and Logny-lès-Chaumont (now a part of Chaumont-Porcien). In 1834 he served in Librecy. He joined the Seminary of Paris Foreign Missions on 4 May 1839. He was sent to Pondicherry, India on 6 January 1840.

== In India ==
Coming to India he served in Tanjore, Kovilur in Dharmapuri District, Tranquabar and also in Karaikal. He became the rector of the Petit Seminaire in Pondicherry and served for five years from 1846 to 1850. The caste Catholics had viewed the decision of the Synod of Pondicherry with regard to the admissions to Petit Seminaire as a veiled threat to the caste system. Tamil news papers from Madras carried letters and articles condemning the acts of the priests. The seminary authorities declared indefinite holidays and the seminary was closed. Normalcy returned only in April 1847 with the intervention of Mgr. Bonnand.

== As a Bishop ==
He was appointed as the coadjutor vicar apostolic of Pondicherry on 3 April 1857. He was ordained a bishop by Ordained Bishop Mgr. Bonnand on 27 August 1857 at Karoumatampatty, Coimbatore with Thermopylae as his titular see. He was simultaneously appointed as an administrator of Coimbatore. When Mgr. Bonnand was appointed as the apostolic visitor of the missions of India and set off for his apostolic visitation in November 1859, Godelle took charge of the mission of Pondicherry. He succeeded Bonnand as the vicar apostolic on 21 March 1861 after the death of the prelate, while remaining an administrator of Coimbatore. He remained in this additional post until 1865 the Vicariate of Coimbatore was entrusted to Bishop Depommier.

== Death ==
In 1867, the Catholic bishops of the world were invited to Rome to solemnize the 18th centenary of the martyrdom of Saints Peter and Paul and to attend the canonization of Twenty-six Martyrs of Japan. Mgr. Godelle, accompanied by Mgr. Charbonnaux, went to Rome. At the end of the celebrations they met the Pope in private audience and started their return journey. During that journey Mgr. Godelle fell ill and he was taken by Mgr.Charbonnaux to Chambéry, where he was admitted in the general hospital, since Mgr. Godelle refused to seek hospitality from the archbishop of Chambéry on account of his austerity and simplicity. He asked Mgr.Charbonnaux to proceed to India while he remained alone in the hospital, in the company of a missionary from China.

On 15 July 1867 he received the last sacraments in the presence of Cardinal Alexis Billiet, the archbishop of Chambéry, and died that day. He was buried in the graveyard of Chambéry and a monument was erected in the Cathedral. On 14 August 1867, a solemn service was held for him at Pondicherry which was attended by all the members of the government and at which military honours were rendered.

In 1870 around the cemetery chapel a vault was prepared to bury clergymen including Mgr. Godelle. His remains were later transferred to the cathedral.

Ordination history of Joseph-Isidore Godelle
History
Episcopal consecration
- Principal consecrator: Clément Bonnand
- Co-consecrators: Etienne-Louis Charbonnaux
Episcopal succession
Bishops consecrated by Joseph-Isidore Godelle as principal consecrator
- Claude-Marie Dépommier: 1865

Catholic Church titles
Preceded by Giovanni Angelo Porta, O.F.M.	— TITULAR — Bishop of Thermopylae; 3 April 1857 – 15 July 1867	Succeeded by Stephen Fennelly
Preceded by Clément Bonnand	Vicar Apostolic of Pondicherry; 21 March 1861 – 15 July 1867	Succeeded by François-Jean-Marie Laouënan
