= Daniel O'Connor (bishop) =

Catholic bishop of Madras

Bishop Daniel O’Connor O.E.S.A.
- Vicar Apostolic of Madras
- See: Madras
- Appointed: 25 April 1834
- Installed: 20 July 1835
- Term ended: 04 April 1840
- Successor: Patrick Joseph Carew

Orders
- Ordination: 1810
- Consecration: 3 August 1834 by John Murphy

Personal details
- Born: Daniel O’Connor; June 6, 1786 Limerick, Ireland
- Died: July 10, 1867 (aged 81) Dublin, Ireland
- Buried: Glasnevin
- Denomination: Catholic

Ordination history of Daniel O'Connor
History
Episcopal consecration
- Principal consecrator: John Murphy
- Co-consecrators: John Ryan Bartholomew Crotty

Daniel O’Connor (1786–1867) was the first vicar apostolic of Madras. He belonged to Augustinians and came as a missionary to India.

== Early life ==
O’Connor was born 6 July 1786 in Limerick city. In 1807 he entered the Augustinian noviciate in Galway, and was professed the following year. He was ordained a priest in 1810, having studied theology in New Ross, County Wexford. After ordination to the priesthood he moved to the Augustinian house in Cork. He was elected provincial around this time and he held rallies for four years to rebuild Dungarvan church in County Waterford. In 1829 he led a delegation to London, which included the Dominican priest John Pius Leahy and Edmund Ignatius Rice, founder of the Christian Brothers, to lobby the government over a clause in the Catholic Emancipation bill which would have prohibited the religious orders. O'Connor was the chief negotiator with the Prime Minister and Home Secretary, and received an assurance that the clause would only be enforced by the attorney general – an action, they believed, that would never be taken.

Doyle recommended O'Connor to the Holy See in 1834 to become the first Irish Catholic vicar apostolic of Madras, India. He was consecrated bishop (3 August 1834) in Cork. O’Connor immediately went about raising money to help him build up the church in Madras. He eventually he collected £942, including money from an Indian princess and a gift of £10 from the Catholic Marchioness Wellesley, of the viceregal lodge, Phoenix Park (sister-in-law to the Prime Minister). He set sail for India on the Duke of Sussex (8 May 1835) from Gravesend, with his secretary and vicar general, Patrick Moriarty (1804–75), and several thousand books, on a journey that took ninety-three days by way of the Cape of Good Hope.

== Apostolic Vicar of Madras ==
On arrival at Madras he assumed his duties as vicar apostolic. O'Connor was the first British subject to take up a position as a bishop in India. All previous bishops being Portuguese. It was not always easy for O'Connor and he spent some considerable time trying to earn government approval and support. By 1836 the civil authorities recognised him as the leader of local Catholics and in turn he acted as a liaison between the Church and Presidency of Madras. Amongst his priorities were healing rifts amongst the local Catholic clergy and establishing a system of Catholic schools, including girls schools, something which went against Hindu custom. A heavy workload combined with an unhealthy climate placed considerable pressure on O’Connor. This combined with a dispute with the Capuchin fathers in India led in 1837 to a severe stroke, which paralysed his left side.

In 1838 he was made Apostolic Administrator of Mylapore. Here he had to resolve a controversy with his brother Augustinians over the ownership of Church property. The Church in Mylapore predated the Church in Madras and was founded in the 1600s by Portuguese missionaries. Amongst his other pastoral projects were a translation of the catechism into the local Tamil language. His health began to decline and after a bout of fever in 1839 he went to Rome, where he remained until 1842. In 1841 he resigned as Apostolic Vicar of Madras and was succeeded by Patrick Joseph Carew. He left India with a heavy heart, and the people he left behind were likewise saddened by his departure. They gave him several departing gifts, a ring and pectoral cross, symbols of his episcopal authority.

After his return to Ireland, O’Connor moved to Dublin, where he spent the remainder of his life at St John's Priory in the Liberties, Dublin, where he was known as the ‘St John's Lane bishop’. O'Connor remained active in general pastoral work. He also took a keen interest in the Repeal movement, visited Daniel O'Connell in Richmond prison in 1844, and celebrated a special Mass of thanksgiving on his release. Bishop O’Connor died 19 July 1867, and was buried in the Augustinian grave at Glasnevin cemetery.
