= Stephen Fennelly =

Irish-born Roman Catholic Bishop of Madras

- Vicar Apostolic of Madras
- Church: Catholic Church
- See: Apostolic Vicariate of Madras
- In office: 7 July 1868 – 3 May 1880
- Predecessor: John Fennelly
- Successor: Joseph Colgan
- Other post: Titular Bishop of Thermopylae (1868-1880)

Orders
- Ordination: 10 June 1843
- Consecration: 4 October 1868 by Étienne-Louis Charbonnaux

Personal details
- Born: 26 December 1816 Moyne, County Tipperary, United Kingdom of Great Britain and Ireland
- Died: 30 May 1880 (aged 63)

Stephen Fennelly (26 December 1816 – 30 May 1880) was an Irish born Roman Catholic Bishop of Madras in India from 1868 until 1880. Fennelly was from Moyne, County Tipperary, he succeeded his brother John Fennelly who had served as Bishop of Madras from 1841 until his death 1868. He served as Vicar General for the Diocese of Madras, he also gained the religious title of Monsignor. He brought the Irish Patrician Brothers to India in 1875.
