= Theertham =

Sacred water linked to a Hindu temple

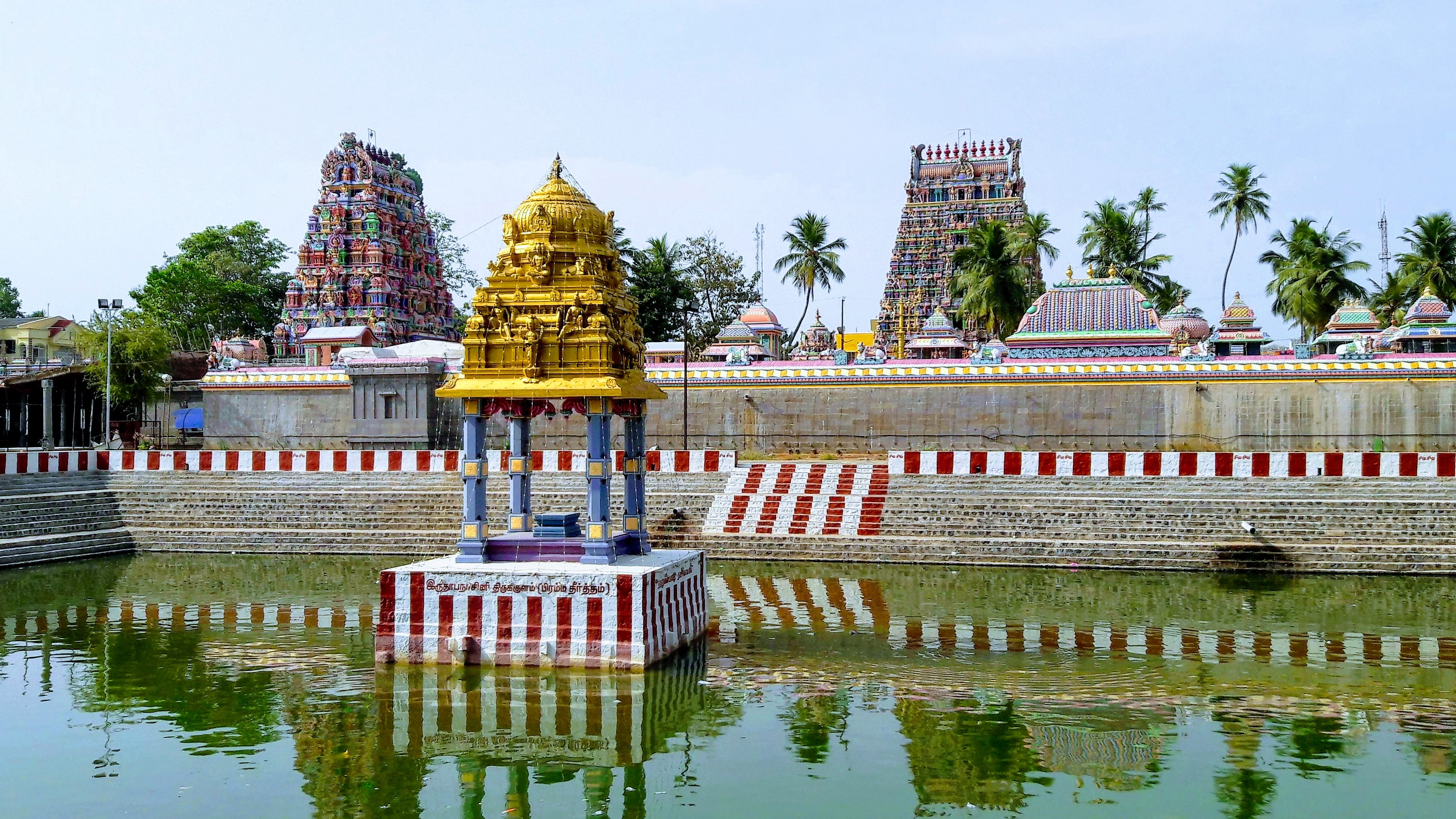
Theertham at Kameeswarar temple

Theertham (Theertha or Tirtha) literally refers to water. In Hindu sacred literature, it is referred to as the physical holy water body associated with a temple or deity. As per Hindu religious belief, water is the principal purification mechanism. While external purification is believed to be through a dip in sacred water bodies, internal purification is through truthfulness. Most Hindu temples are associated with bodies of water, which are called Theertham. In Vishnu temples, devotees are offered a few drops of sacred water called Theertham.

== Etymology ==
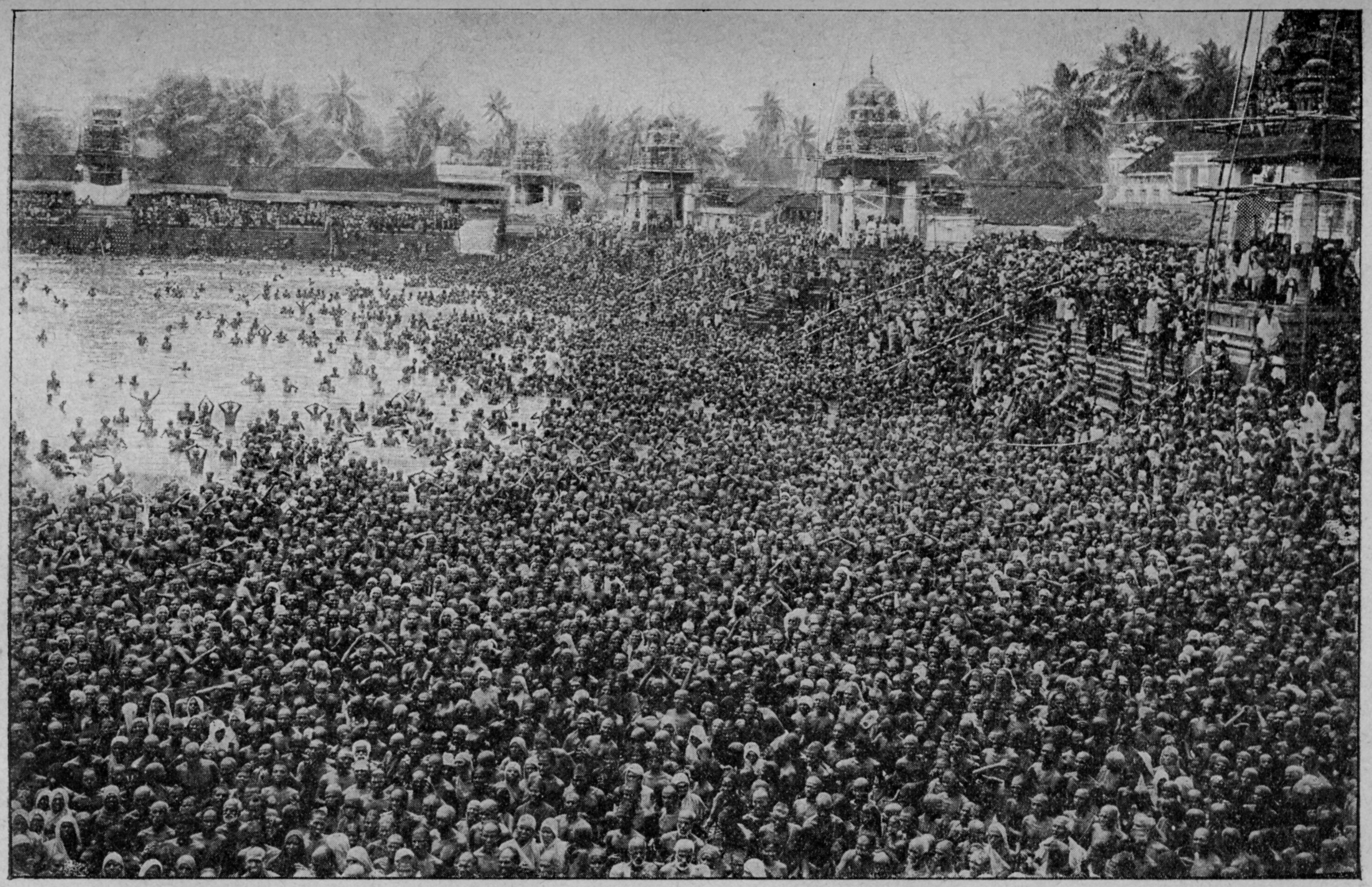
Theerthavari festival during 1905

As per Hindu mythology, Hindu temples are usually associated with the trio of Moorthy (image), Stalam (sacred place) and Theertham (a body of water). While most temples are located near rivers or lakes, the temples are usually associated with them. Temple tanks and wells are dug inside or outside the temple for all religious purposes. Also, most temples were centers of social and economic activities, making a waterbody very essential inside the premises. There are various Hindu legends which mention that the temples' tanks are usually created by celestial bodies or have been propitiated off their curse by taking a holy dip in such bodies of water. In Vishnu temples, devotees are offered a few drops of sacred water called Theertham. The names of such bodies of water are usually named after the celestial bodies or the characteristics of the sin propitiated. The Theerthams in the famous Tirupathi Venkateshwara Temple are Markandeya Theertham (relating to longevity), Agneya Theertham (redeems sins) and Yama Theertham (avoid hell).

== Theertha Yatra ==
Theertha Yatra is the pilgrimage associated with Hinduism. Rig Veda and Atharvaveda have detailed mention about the famous pilgrimage sites in India. Mahabharata identifies around 300 religious sites related to Theertha yatra. In Hinduism, the yatra (pilgrimage) to the tirthas (sacred places) has special significance for earning the punya (spiritual merit) needed to attain the moksha (salvation). Due to political issues, the Tirthas in India were disrupted during the medieval period. These days, Theertha Yatra are organized in group by travel agencies and sometimes by the government bodies. Char Dham (meaning: four abodes) is a set of four pilgrimage sites in India. It is believed that visiting these sites helps achieve moksha (salvation). The four Dhams are, Badrinath, Dwarka, Puri and Rameswaram as defined by Adi Shankaracharya consists of four Hindu pilgrimage sites along famour river banks. There are major tourist Theertha Yatra circuits in India covering various historic and religious themes.

== Theerthavari ==
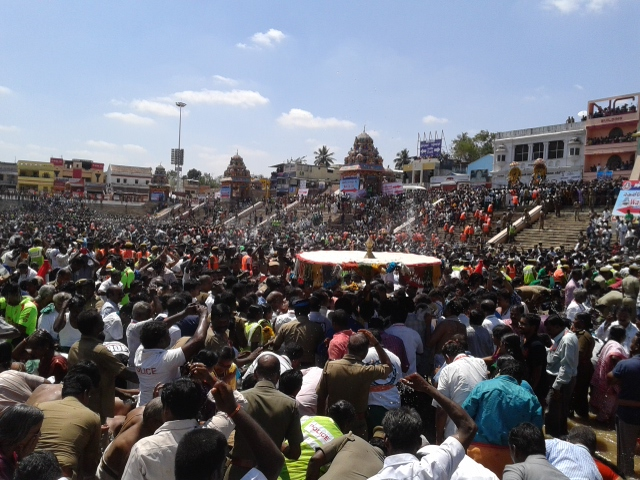
Theerthavari during Mahamaham in Kumbakonam

Theerthavari is a common practice followed in some of the South Indian temples, where the festival idol is brought to the waterbody associated with the temple on an auspicious day annually. The devotees also take a holy dip along with other the festival deity. During the evenings of such festivals, float festival is celebrated in the temples during which the festive deity is taken in the decorated float in the temple tank. The purificatory bath is believed to remove sins and after the dip, pilgrims offer charitable gifts in the hope of being rewarded in the current life and subsequent lives. The Hindus consider taking a pilgrimage and holy dip during the Theerthavari as sacred. The Theerthavari festivals in a given region also follow the upstream and downstream flow of river, like in the case of river Kaveri. The upstream temples in regions like Trichy and Kumbakonam perform Theerthavari during the Tamil month of Maasi (February - March) while the downstream temples in regions like Mayiladuthurai have the festival during Aipasi (April -May).

== See also ==
- Hindu calendar
- Kshetram
- List of Hindu temples
- Sacred waters
