= John Fennelly =

Irish bishop (1816–1868)

- Vicar Apostolic of Madras
- Church: Catholic Church
- See: Apostolic Vicariate of Madras
- In office: 30 April 1841 – 23 January 1868
- Predecessor: Patrick Joseph Carew
- Successor: Stephen Fennelly
- Other post: Titular Bishop of Castoria (1841-1868)

Orders
- Consecration: 27 June 1841 by Daniel Murray

Personal details
- Born: 1806 Moyne, County Tipperary, United Kingdom of Great Britain and Ireland
- Died: 23 January 1868 (aged 61–62)

John Fennelly (1806 – 23 January 1868) was an Irish born Roman Catholic Bishop of Madras in India from 1841 until 1868. Fennelly was from Moyne, County Tipperary, studied for the priesthood in Maynooth College, and was ordained, he came to India in 1839 as part of the Maynooth Mission to Madras, and appointed Bishop in 1841, succeeding another Irish born Bishop Patrick Joseph Carew. Fennelly was succeeded by his brother Stephen Fennelly as Bishop of Madras in 1868. He served as bishop until his death in 1868.

== See also ==
- Catholic Church in India
