= Villianur railway station =

Railway station in India

Villianur
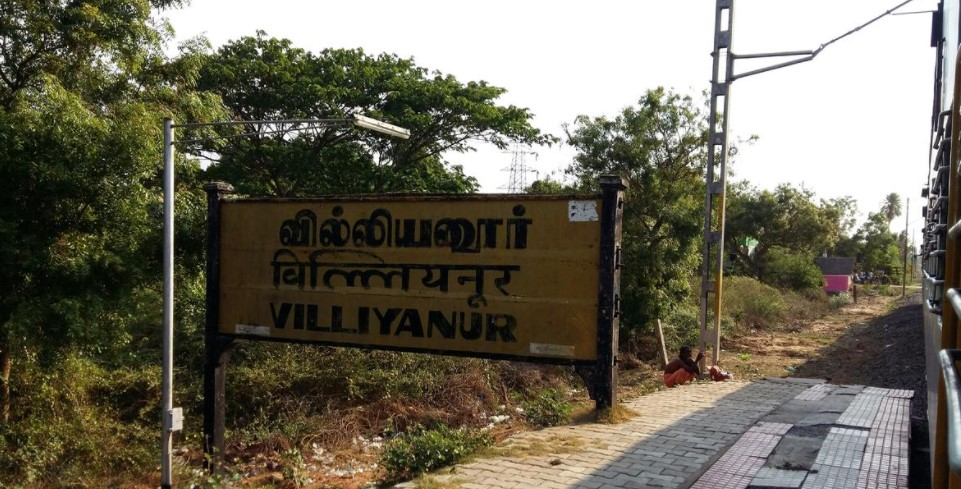

General information
- Location: NH 45A, Sulthanpet, Villianur, Villianur taluk, Puducherry; India
- Coordinates: 11.9202°N 79.7583°E
- Elevation: 11 metres (36 ft)
- System: Light rail station
- Owner: Indian Railways
- Operator: Southern Railway zone
- Platforms: 1
- Tracks: 2

Construction
- Structure type: Standard (on ground station)
- Parking: Yes
- Accessible: Disabled access

Other information
- Status: Functioning
- Station code: VI
- Zone(s): Southern Railway zone
- Division(s): Tiruchirappalli
Route map
Location

Villianur railway station is a railway station in Sulthanpet, Villianur, Villianur taluk, Puducherry.

== Jurisdiction ==
It belongs to the Tiruchirappalli railway division of the Southern Railway zone in Puducherry district in Puducherry. The station code is VI.

== About ==
This passenger station falls between Viluppuram Junction–Puducherry broad-gauge section.

== Notable places nearby ==
- Our Lady of Lourdes Shrine, Villianur
- Sri Gokilambal Thirukameshwara Temple (or) Villianur Temple
