= François-Jean-Marie Laouënan =

Archbishop François-Jean-Marie Laouënan M.E.P.
- Archbishop of Pondicherry
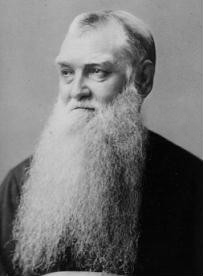
- See: Pondicherry
- Appointed: 24 July 1868
- Installed: 11 October 1868
- Term ended: 29 September 1892
- Predecessor: Joseph-Isidore Godelle
- Successor: Joseph-Adolphe Gandy

Orders
- Ordination: 6 June 1846
- Consecration: 11 October 1868 by Etienne-Louis Charbonnaux

Personal details
- Born: François-Jean-Marie Laouënan; 19 November 1822 Lannion, France
- Died: 29 September 1892 (aged 69) Sanatorium of Montbeton, France
- Denomination: Catholic
- Motto: MISERICORDIAS DOMINI IN AETERNUM CANTABO (I will sing the mercy of the Lord in eternity Ps. 89(88):2)
- Coat of arms: François-Jean-Marie Laouënan's coat of arms

Ordination history of François-Jean-Marie Laouënan
History
Episcopal consecration
- Principal consecrator: Etienne-Louis Charbonnaux
- Co-consecrators: Alexis Canoz Claude-Marie Dépommier
Episcopal succession
Bishops consecrated by François-Jean-Marie Laouënan as principal consecrator
- Etienne-Auguste-Joseph-Louis Bardou: 1874
- Jean-Yves-Marie Coadou: 1880
- Joseph Colgan: 1882
- Joseph-Adolphe Gandy: 1883

François-Jean-Marie Laouënan (19 November 1868 – 29 September 1892) was a member of Paris Foreign Missions Society and was the archbishop of Archdiocese of Pondicherry. On 24 July 1868 he was appointed to succeed Bishop Joseph-Isidore Godelle as Vicar Apostolic of Pondicherry. He was consecrated as a bishop on 11 October 1868. When Pope Leo XII established Catholic hierarchy in India, Mgr. Laouënan was appointed as Archbishop of the same see on 25 November 1886. He was the archbishop until his death on 29 September 1892. He was succeeded by Joseph-Adolphe Gandy.

== Early life ==
Laouënan was born on 19 November 1822 in Lannion, Côtes-du-Nord. After having studied at the minor seminaries of Plouguernével and Tréguier, he spent a year in the Seminary of Saint-Brieuc. Later he entered the Seminary of the MEP on 29 September 1843. He was ordained as a Priest on 6 June 1846. He was sent on 1 August to Pondicherry. In January 1847 he was appointed as a teacher at the colonial college of this city. Upon his own request he was transferred to Kumakonam in May 1857 by Bishop Bonnand.

From 1859 to 1862, he accompanied Bishop Bonnand and Bishop Charbonnaux on the Apostolic visitation of the missions of India. Based on the experience he gained in those travels, he authored the book: Du Brahmanisme Et de Ses Rapports Avec Le Judaisme Et Le Christianisme. (Brahmanism and its relation to Judaism and Christianity) which he published in 1885 at the Académie française at Prix Bordin. After returning to Pondicherry, he directed the Seminary of the mission, and in 1866, resumed his former duties as the principal of colonial college.

== As Vicar Apostolic ==
After the death of Mgr. Joseph-Isidore Godelle in 1867, Laouënan was recommended as his successor. on 5 June 1868, Pope Pius IX appointed him as the Titular Bishop of Flaviopolis and Vicar Apostolic of Pondicherry. He wrote to the Pope expressing his unwillingness to assume this post. But pope rejected his plea. He was consecrated at the Immaculate Conception Cathedral, Pondicherry on 11 October 1868 by Bishop Charbonnaux.

In 1870 he attended the First Vatican Council with Bishop Charbonnaux and Bishop Dépommier. He had been appointed as the 19th member of the commission of the Eastern Rite and Missions in January of that year. He also collaborated actively on the reforming of the regulations of Paris Foreign Missions Society.

Returning to his mission, he applied himself for development works. He rebuilt the seminary, and develop Saint-Joseph's College in Cuddalore. Under his leadership and conversions surged in-spite of ongoing famine; Many consider this surge is due to poor hungry people attracted to the charitable benefits of the Missionaries. In 1874 he drafted the "Statutes of the Vicariate of Pondicherry". In 1879 this was revised and published as the "Directory of the Mission". It had directives concerning the duties of missionaries and their attitude concerning the duties of the missionaries and their attitude towards customs of the country, especially those concerning Hindu marriages.

In 1883, citing his frail health he requested for a coadjutor. Mgr Gandy was appointed as his coadjutor. He consecrated him on 9 September of the same year.

== As Archbishop ==
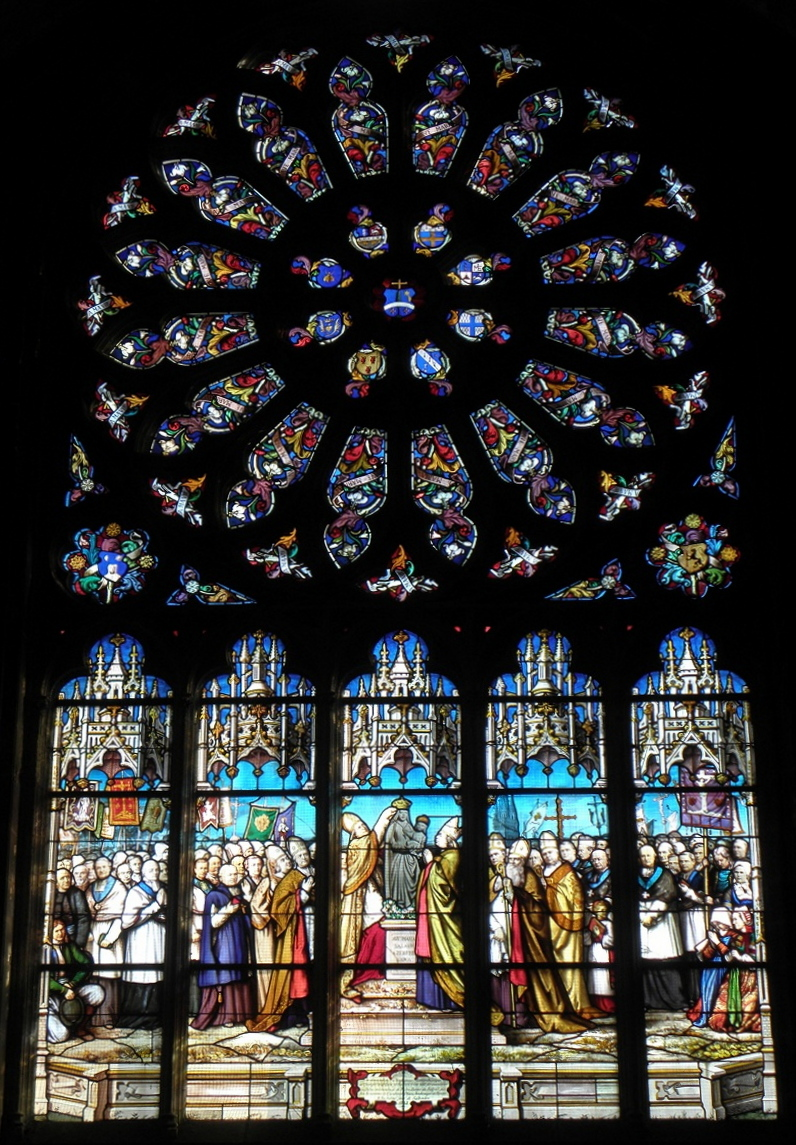
Full Stained Glass window

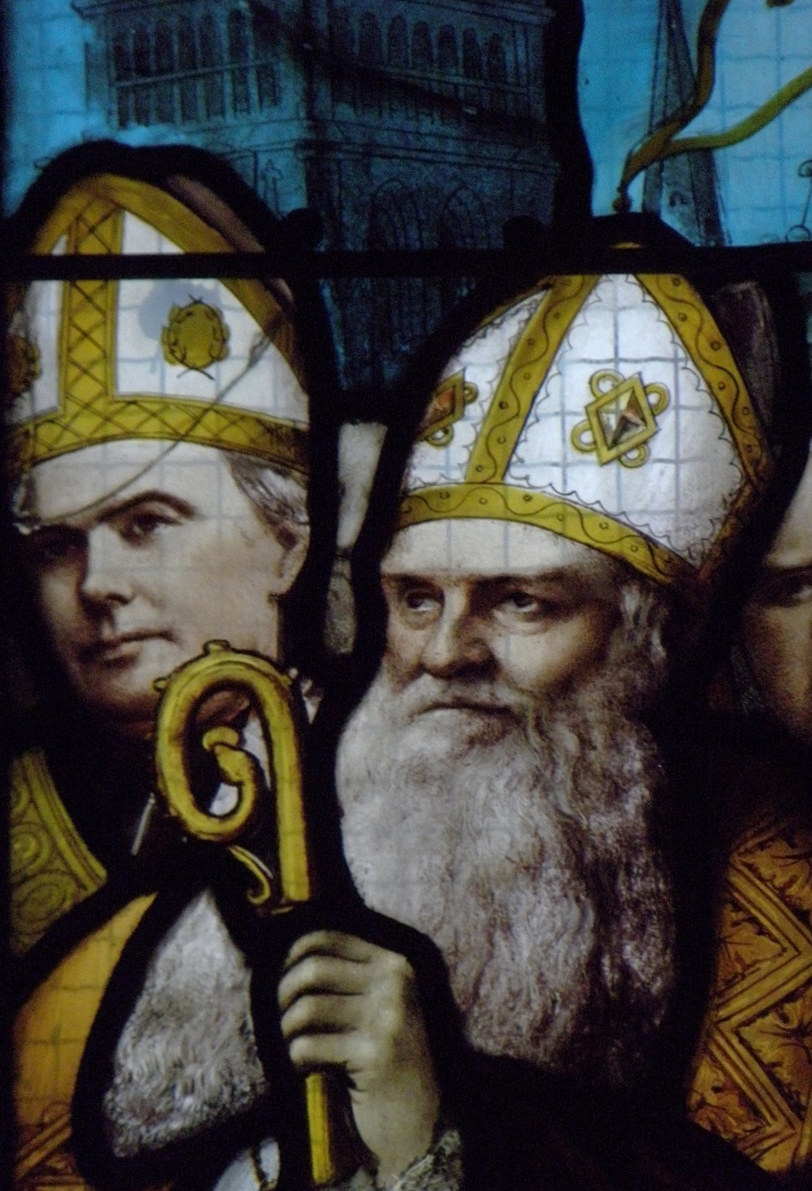
Closer view of Mgr. Laouënan

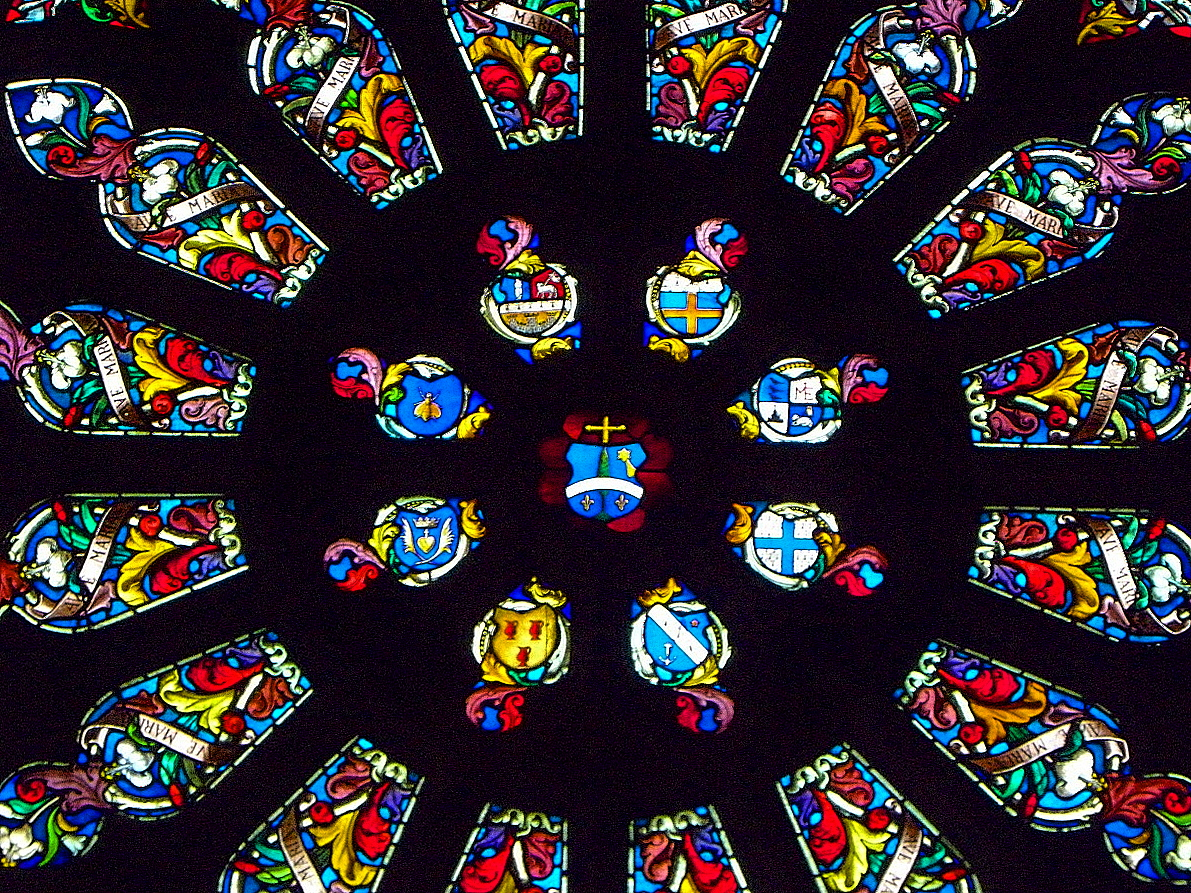
Arms of Laouënan and other Bishops

Mgr. Laouënan at the coronation of Our Lady of Folgoët in 1888. The Basilica of Our Lady of Folgoët, France. Artist: Émile Hirsch

Styles of François-Jean-Marie Laouënan
- Reference style: His Excellency
- Spoken style: Your Excellency
- Religious style: The Most Reverend

He took a very active part in the negotiations which preceded the Concordat, signed on 23 June 1886 between Rome and Portugal, for the establishment of the Catholic hierarchy in the India. On this occasion, he was called to Rome by Pope Leo XIII in 1884; He proposed solutions with such a skill and wisdom that in 1886 Pope Leo XIII made him a Roman count and Assistant at the Pontifical Throne.

The thorny issue ended with the establishment of the hierarchy in India, which was decreed by the bull Humanae salutis, dated 1 September 1886. On 25 November by the brief Apostolatus officium, Pope transferred the incumbent Bishops of titular sees in India to respective churches. Laouënan was appointed Archbishop of Pondicherry, and on 17 March 1887 he received the pallium.

On 21 February 1886 Laouënan with the permission of Pope Leo XIII, declared Our Lady of Lourdes, Villianur as a Marian Shrine and canonically crowned the statue there in the pope's name.

In 1888, he participated in the Canonical Coronation of Our Lady of Folgoët. He is depicted along with other participants in the stained glass window at the Basilica of Our Lady of Folgoët. His coat of arms is depicted too.

== Death ==
In 1891 his health gave way, and in March he had several attacks described as cerebral congestion. He went to France hoping for a cure, but worsened, and died at the Sanatorium of Montbeton on 29 September 1892.

Catholic Church titles
Preceded by Eugene O'Connell	— TITULAR — Archbishop of Flaviopolis; 24 July 1868 – 25 November 1886	Succeeded by Giovanni Battista Bongiorni
Preceded by Joseph-Isidore Godelle	Vicar Apostolic of Pondicherry; 24 July 1868 – 25 November 1886	Vicariate elevated to Archdiocese
New creation	Archbishop of Pondicherry; 25 November 1886 – 29 September 1892	Succeeded by Joseph-Adolphe Gandy
