= Dictionarium Latino Canarense =

1861 dictionary of the Kannada language

The Dictionarium Latino-Canarense (Latin-Kannada dictionary) is an 1861 dictionary of the Kannada language.

== History ==
After the suppression of the Society of Jesus and the fall of Tipu Sultan in 1799, the MEP (Société des Missions Étrangères de Paris or Paris Foreign Missions Society) priests took over and tended to the spiritual needs to the Christians dwelling in the then Princely state of Mysore in India. It was through this mission society the ancient Latin Kannada Dictionary was published in 1861.

This book is the first of its kind in the lines of Lexicon works carried out by foreign missionaries and was before the works of Ferdinand Kittel. This book was intended for scholars, seminarians and visitors who knew Latin but not the vernacular.

The author's name is not mentioned in the book. The cover page says "Auctore RR Episcopo Jassensi, V. A. Maissurensi,...", revealing that the author of this book is a Bishop sent to Mysore. "V. A." refers to the "apostolic vicar" who was delegated by the Pope in those days, Bishop Etienne Louis Charbonnaux.

Charbonnaux was born on 20 March 1806, and undertook the priesthood at the major seminary of Angers in France. He took 15 years to finish the thesaurus. On arriving at Puducherry in India in 1830, Charbonnaux stayed for some time in Karaikal to learn Tamil and Telugu. Later he was sent to Srirangapatna, capital city of Mysore kingdom, to minister to its 3,500 Catholics.

Initially Charbonnaux used the Latin Tamil Dictionary to compose his Kannada lexicon. By the end he was able to refer to Reeve’s Dictionary and explore ancient Kannada literature. But like Kittel he was not a linguist and had no experience editing or in the methodology of making a Dictionary. He was particularly interested in finding the nearest Kannada word to each Latin word. It is not only historically significant but notable in Linguistic studies.

In this dictionary Charbonnaux gave Latin words in alphabetical order, adding classical Latin, vulgar Latin and Poetic phrases. And at the same time he gives the variety of colloquial in Kannada, its regional accents and the difference of meanings. He first gives everyday vocabulary. He used 19th century Kannada fonts that are unfamiliar to most Kannada readers.

== See also ==
- Kannada language
