= Joseph Colgan =

Irish born Roman Catholic Archbishop

- Archbishop of Madras
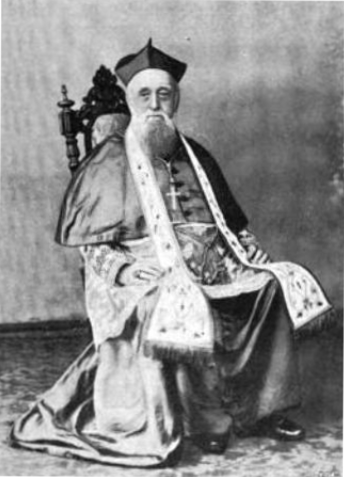
- Church: Catholic Church
- Archdiocese: Archdiocese of Madras
- In office: 19 May 1882 – 13 February 1911
- Predecessor: Stephen Fennelly
- Successor: Jan Aelen
- Previous post: Titular Bishop of Aureliopolis in Lydia (1882-1886)

Orders
- Ordination: 1846
- Consecration: 24 August 1882 by François-Jean-Marie Laouënan

Personal details
- Born: 1 April 1824 Donore, County Westmeath, United Kingdom of Great Britain and Ireland
- Died: 13 February 1911 (aged 86) Calcutta, Presidency of Fort William in Bengal, British Raj, British Empire
- Education: Maynooth College

Bishop Joseph Colgan, DD (1 April 1824 – 13 February 1911), was an Irish born Roman Catholic Archbishop of Madras, India.

== Biography ==
Born on 1 April 1824 in Donore, County Westmeath, he studied in Navan, and for the priesthood in Maynooth College. Colgan was ordained in 1846. In 1847, he moved to India, where he served as a school principal, and Army Chaplin and priest in the Madras Vicarate.

Colgan served as a reverend for around 30 years, from 1851 to 1881, in the Arcot Cantonment, which at the time had a Catholic population of 2000. Colgan was honored by being named a Fellow of Madras University. Colgan was appointed Bishop of Madras in 1882 succeeding Bishop Stephen Fennelly and became the first Archbishop of Madras in 1886.

Colgan served as archbishop until he died in Calcutta on 13 February 1911.
