= Archdiocese of Madras and Mylapore =

Roman Catholic archdiocese in Tamil Nadu, India

Coordinates: 13.0337°N 80.2775°E

Archdiocese of Madras and Mylapore Archidioecesis Madraspolitanus et Meliaporensis சென்னை-மயிலை உயர்மறைமாவட்டம்

Location
- Country: India
- Territory: Tamil Nadu
- Ecclesiastical province: Madras and Mylapore
- Metropolitan: Chennai

Statistics
- Area: 3,160 km^{2} (1,220 sq mi)
- Population: Total; Catholics: (as of 2023); 9,760,300; 785,574 (7.3%)
- Parishes: 128 Parishes, 350+ Sub Parishes
- Schools: 75 Middle School, 145 Higher Secondary School

Information
- Denomination: Roman Catholic
- Rite: Latin Rite
- Established: 9 January 1606, erection of the diocese of Mylapore by pope Paul V Archdiocese of Madras and Mylapore on 13 November 1952 (Papal Bull, ‘Ex Primaevae Ecclesiae’ by Pope Pius XII)
- Cathedral: St. Thomas Cathedral Basilica, Santhome
- Co-cathedral: St. Mary of the Angels Co-Cathedral, Georgetown
- Secular priests: 152

Current leadership
- Pope: Leo XIV
- Metropolitan Archbishop: George Antonysamy
- Vicar General: Fr. Stanley Sebastian
- Bishops emeritus: Malayappan Chinnappa (2005-2012)

The Roman Catholic Archdiocese of Madras and Mylapore (Latin: Madraspolitan(us) et Meliaporen(sis)) is an archdiocese based in the city of Chennai (known as Madras earlier), in the Indian state of Tamil Nadu. It was formed by merging the ancient diocese of Mylapore, which now a part of Chennai, with the Archdiocese of Madras in 1952.

== History ==
- 9 January 1606: erection of the diocese of Mylapore by pope Paul V separated from the Diocese of Cochin, by agreement with the king of Portugal who received power to appoint bishops and priests and, in a general way, to look after the evangelization of the area (Padroado system and jurisdiction)
- 1642: Madras Capuchin Mission founded by French Capuchin Missionary Fr. Ephrem de Nevers was Established as Prefecture Vicariate of Fort Saint George This was an independent jurisdiction of the Propaganda Fide from the Padroado Diocese of São Tomé of Meliapore
- 1832: Renamed as Apostolic Vicariate of Madras
- 1 September 1886: Promoted as Metropolitan Archdiocese of Madras
- 10 October 1950: The Padroado system is cancelled. The Diocese of Mylapore comes under the jurisdiction of the 'Propaganda Fide'.
- 13 November 1952: Mylapore and Madras are merged into the renamed 'Metropolitan Archdiocese of Madras and Mylapore' (Bull Ex primaevae ecclesiae of Pius XII).

== Leadership ==
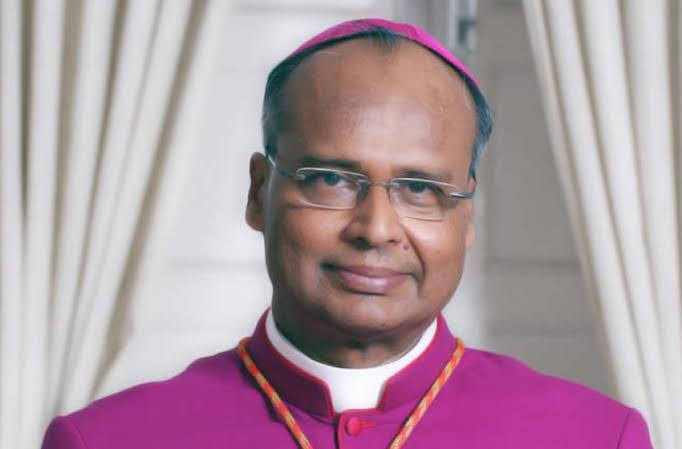
Archbishop George Antonysamy the present Archbishop of Chennai and Mylapore

George Antonysamy is appointed as the Archbishop of Historical Metropolitan Roman Catholic Archdiocese of Madras–Mylapore on 21 November 2012. He was installed as the 6th Archbishop of Madras–Mylapore on 27 January 2013.

== Episcopal ordinaries ==
=== Archbishops of Madras and Mylapore (Latin Rite) ===
  - Archbishop George Antonysamy (21 November 2012 – present); formerly, Apostolic Nuncio (Liberia, Gambia, & Sierra Leone)
  - Archbishop Malayappan Chinnappa, S.D.B. (1 April 2005 – 21 November 2012)
  - Archbishop James Masilamony Arul Das (11 May 1994 – 30 August 2004)
  - Archbishop Casimir Gnanadickam, S.J. (26 January 1987 – 10 November 1993)
  - Archbishop Anthony Rayappa Arulappa (1 February 1966 – 26 January 1987)
  - Archbishop Louis Mathias, S.D.B. (13 November 1952 – 2 August 1965)

=== Metropolitan Archbishops of Madras (Latin Rite) ===
  - Archbishop Louis Mathias, S.D.B. (25 March 1935 – 13 November 1952)
  - Archbishop Eugène Mederlet, S.D.B. (3 July 1928 – 12 December 1934)
  - Archbishop Giovanni Aelen, M.H.M. (13 February 1911 – 1928)
  - Archbishop Joseph Colgan (19 May 1882 – 13 February 1911)

=== Vicars Apostolic of Madras ===
  - Bishop Stephen Fennelly (1868-1880)
  - Bishop John Fennelly (1841-1868)
  - Bishop Patrick Joseph Carew (1840-1841)
  - Bishop Daniel O'Connor, O.S.A. (1834-1840)

== Seat of Power ==
=== Santhome Cathedral ===
Santhome Cathedral, Mylapore, Chennai

San Thome Church, officially known as St Thomas Cathedral Basilica and National Shrine of Saint Thomas, is a minor basilica of the Catholic Church and the Seat of power of the Roman Catholic Archdiocese of Madras and Mylapore in India, at the Santhome neighbourhood of Chennai, in Tamil Nadu. The present structure dates to 1523 AD, when it was rebuilt by the Portuguese over what was believed to be the tomb of Thomas the Apostle. In 1896, it was renovated in the Madras province according to neo-Gothic designs, as was favoured by British architects in the late 19th century.

=== St.Mary's Co-Cathedral ===
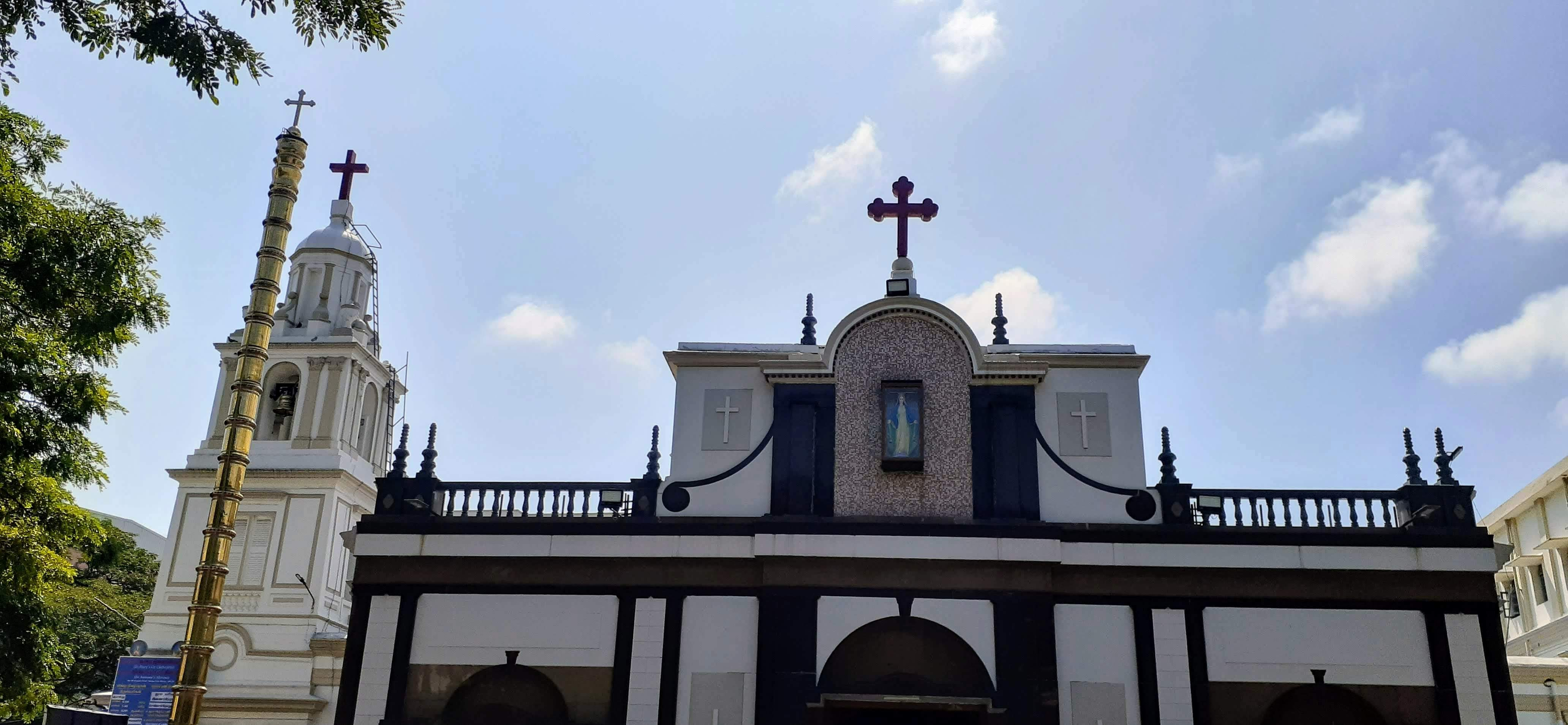
St. Mary's Co-cathedral, George Town, Chennai.

St. Mary's Co-Cathedral is a Catholic church in Armenian Street, Chennai, India. Constructed by Capuchins in 1658, it is one of the oldest churches in the former British India. For serving for a long time as Cathedral of the diocese of Madras, it received the title of co-cathedralwhen the seat of the newly formed Roman Catholic Archdiocese of Madras and Mylapore was transferred to San Thome Basilica after the merger of dioceses in 1952.

=== Archbishop House ===
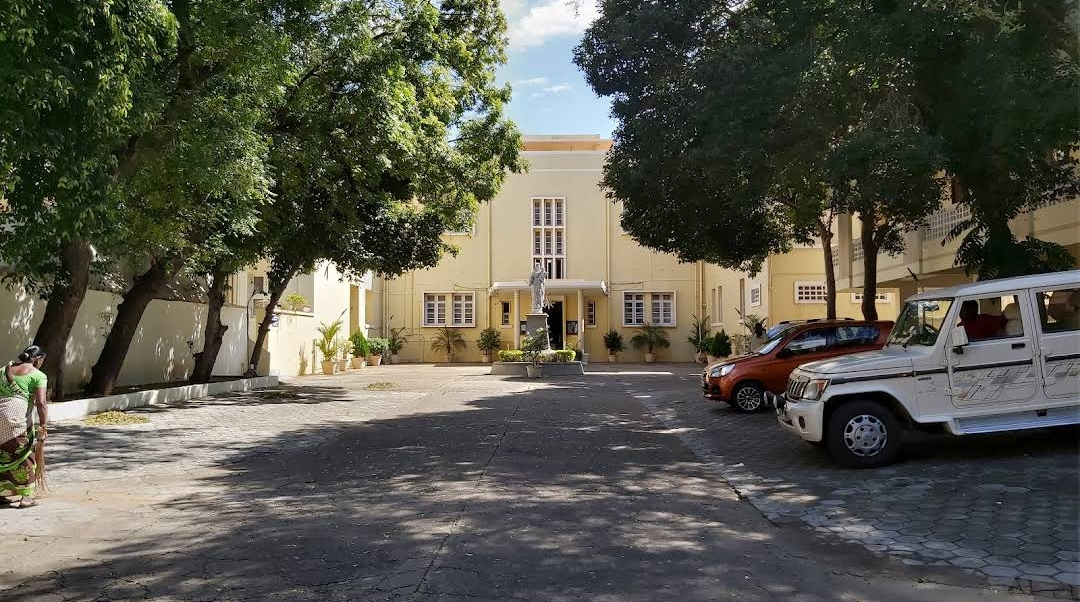
Madras-Mylapore Archbishop House located in Santhome, Chennai.

The Archbishop House is located in Santhome, Mylapore in Chennai next to the San Thome Basilica. The Archbishop house is the residence of the head and Archbishop of Roman Catholic Archdiocese of Madras and Mylapore.

== Ecclesiastical province ==
- Diocese of Chingleput
- Diocese of Coimbatore
- Diocese of Ootacamund
- Diocese of Vellore

== Statistics ==
The Archdiocese of Chennai-Mylapore is one of the oldest and largest diocese in India. At present there are about 128 parishes and 350+ sub stations in the diocese to enhance the Catholic faith. There are 75 Middle schools, 145 Higher Secondary Schools and 7 colleges are in the jurisdiction of the diocese to impart education to the children. And there are 39 Major and Minor seminaries in the diocese.

The Count of Religious men and women are

- Diocesan Priest 173
- Religious Priest 273
- Religious Brothers 182
- Religious sisters 1551

== Patron Saints ==
=== Saint Thomas the Apostle ===
Saint Thomas the Apostle, is the primary patron of this Archdiocese. According to tradition, Saint Thomas, one of the twelve Apostles of Jesus Christ walked on the sands of Mylapore and preached the Gospel to the people who embraced Christianity. This great Apostle was martyred on St.Thomas Mount, near Mylapore in the year 72 AD and his mortal remains were buried in Santhome in the Church built by him.

== Saints and causes for canonisation ==
- The tomb of St. Thomas the Apostle is in Chennai.
- Ven. António Barroso, bishop of the diocese of Saint Thomas of Mylapore
- Servant of God, Mother Thatipatri Gnanamma

== Religious congregations, societies and institutes ==
=== Religious institutes of men ===
- Oblates of Mary Immaculate
- Brothers of St.Patrick's
- Carmelites of Mary Immaculate
- Congregation of the Blessed Sacrament
- Congregation of the Missions
- Congregation of the Holy Redeemer
- Herald of Good News
- Holy Cross Brothers of Sacred Heart
- Hospitaller Brothers of St.John of God
- Missionaries of Mary Immaculate
- Missionaries of St.Francis De Sales
- Missionary Brothers of Charity
- Monfort Brothers of St.Gabriel
- Order of Friars Minor (Franciscans)
- Order of Friars Minor (Capuchins)
- Salesians of Don Bosco
- Servants of Charity
- Society of Jesus
- Society of St.Paul
- Sons of Immaculate Heart of Mary
