= São Tomé de Meliapore =

Province of Portuguese India

São Tomé de Meliapore was a province of Portuguese India which existed from 1523 to 1749. Administered by a Captain-Major, it covered most of Mylapore, a present-day Chennai neighbourhood.

== See also ==
- Roman Catholic Diocese of Saint Thomas of Mylapore
