= Villianur =

Human settlement in India

- Neighbourhood
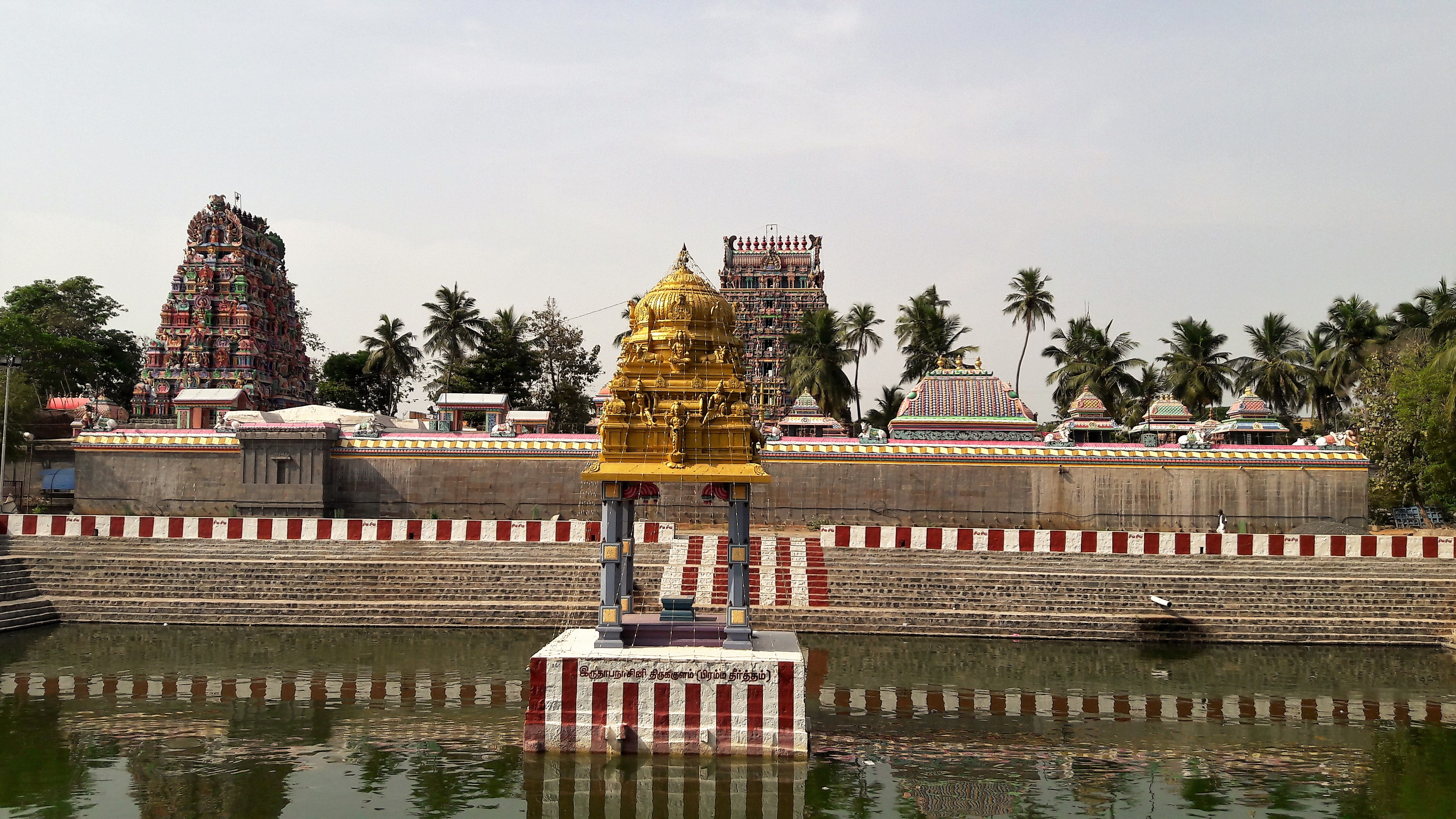
- Kameeswarar temple pushkarini

- Villianur, Puducherry
- Coordinates: 11.9106°N 79.7586°E
- Country: India
- Union territory: Puducherry
- District: Puducherry

Area
  - Total: 65 km^{2} (25 sq mi)
- Elevation: 38.82 m (127.4 ft)

Population (2011)
  - Total: 34,383
  - Density: 530/km^{2} (1,400/sq mi)

Languages
  - Official: Tamil
  - Additional: English, French
- Time zone: UTC+5:30 (IST)
- PIN: 605110
- Telephone code: +91413*******
- Vehicle registration: PY - 05 ** xxxx
- Other Neighbourhoods: Ariyankuppam, Thattanchavadi, Mangalam
- LS: Puducherry
- VS: Villianur

Villianur or Villianoor, Villenour in French, is a commune panchayat and the headquarters of the Villianur taluk of Puducherry District. Our Lady of Lourdes Shrine and Kameeswarar temple are two major landmarks in the town.

== Location ==
Villianur is located at a distance of 9 kilometres south of Puducherry Municipality. It forms a part of the Puducherry urban agglomeration. The town houses famous Sri Kokilambigaiyammai udanarai Thirukameeswarar temple. Located in the banks of Sankaraparani River. surrounded by more industries. It has several years old Villianur railway station, formed during French rule.

== Demographics ==
According to the 2001 census, Villianur had a population of 104,000. It is the third largest town in Puducherry District after Puducherry and Ozhukarai.

== See also ==
- Our Lady of Lourdes Shrine, Villianur
- Villianur railway station
- Kameeswarar temple
- Sankaraparani River
