= Clément Bonnand =

Roman Catholic bishop

Monsignor Clément Bonnand M.E.P.
- Vicar Apostolic of Pondicherry; Titular Bishop of Druzipara
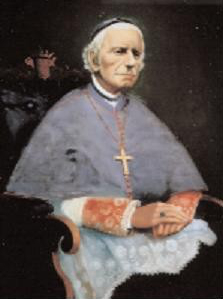
- Monsignor Clément Bonnand
- Church: Catholic Church
- Installed: 3 April 1850
- Term ended: 21 March 1861
- Predecessor: Louis-Charles-Auguste Hébert
- Successor: Joseph-Isidore Godelle

Orders
- Ordination: 17 June 1821
- Consecration: 10 November 1833 by Bishop Louis-Charles-Auguste Hébert

Personal details
- Born: 20 May 1796 Saint-Maurice-sur-Dargoire, France
- Died: 21 March 1861 (aged 64) Benares
- Buried: Immaculate Conception Cathedral, Pondicherry
- Denomination: Catholic

Clément Bonnand, MEP (French pronunciation: [klemɑ̃ bɔnɑ̃]; 20 May 1796 – 21 March 1861) was a French Catholic missionary of Paris Foreign Missions Society and was the Vicar Apostolic of Pondicherry from 3 April 1850 until his death on 21 March 1861.

He was born on 20 May 1796 in Saint-Maurice-sur-Dargoire, France, he was ordained a priest on 17 June 1821. He served for some time as an assistant in a parish of his own diocese. He joined the MEP Seminary on 14 November 1823. He left for the Malabar Mission on 4 February 1824 and served first at Phirangipuram in Andhra Pradesh.

== Consecration ==
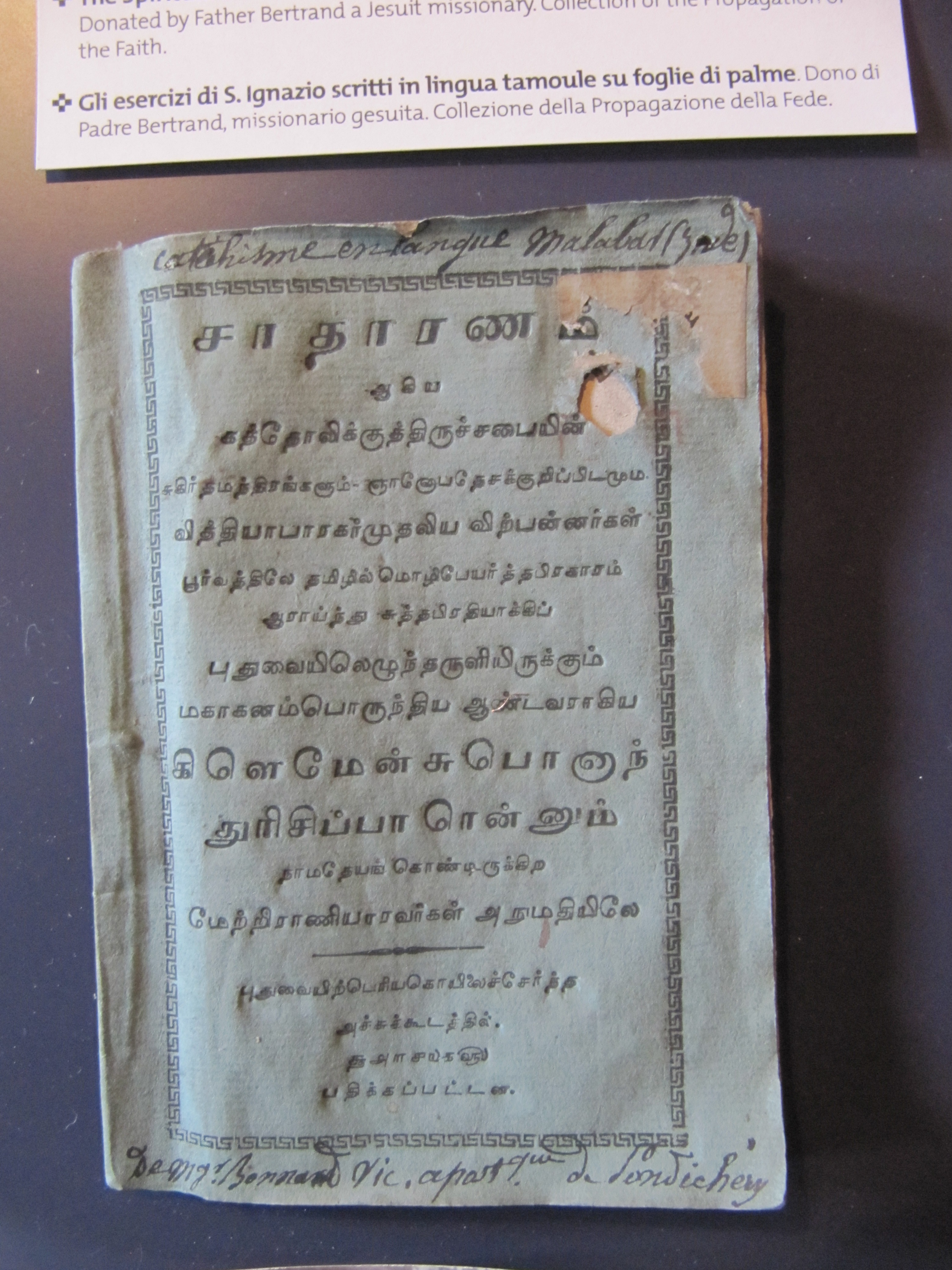
Catechism book printed in Mission press by Clément Bonnand in 1841, donated by Fr. Brertrand S.J to the Congregation of propagation of faith, is now preserved in a Museum in France

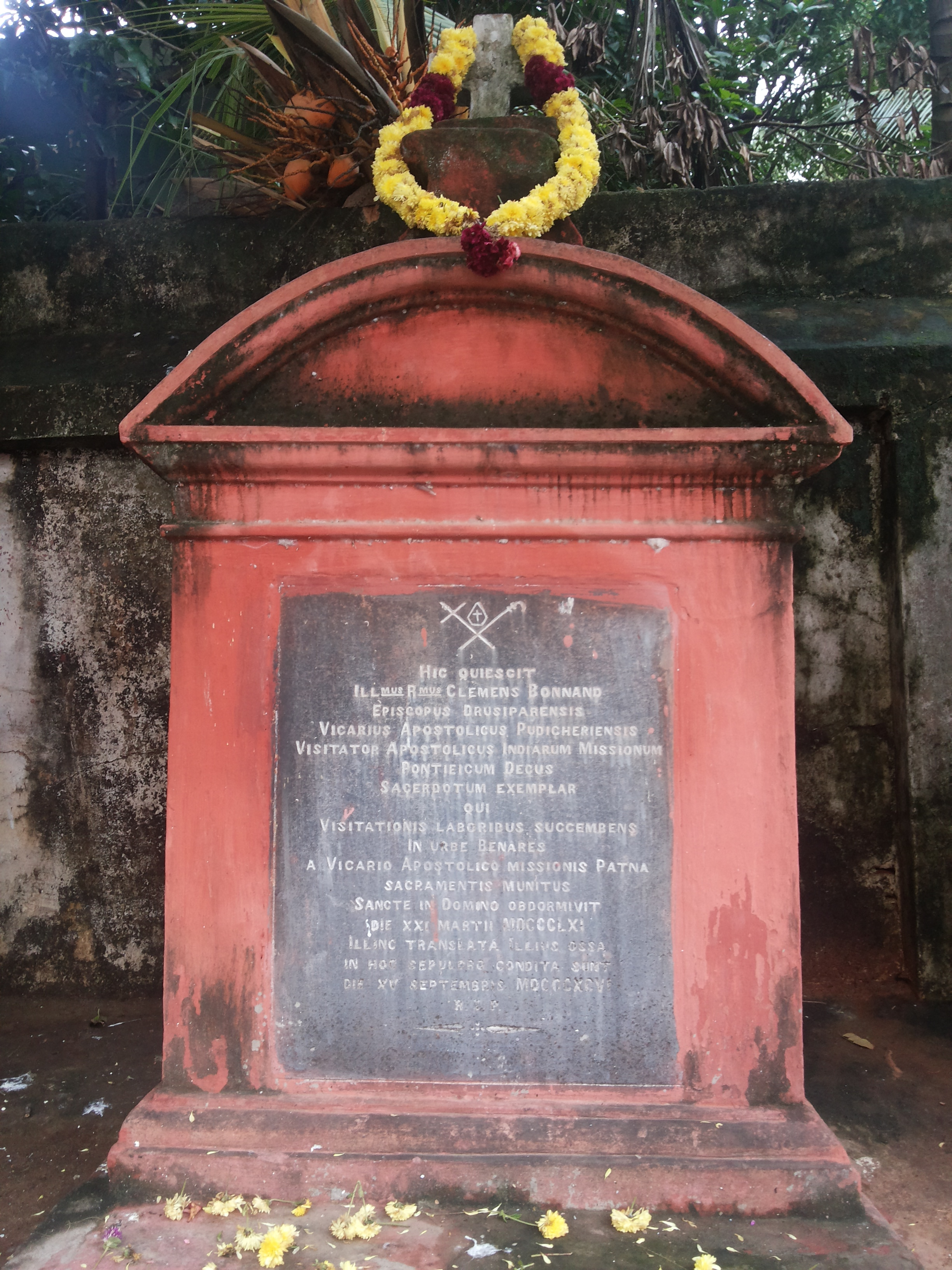
Tomb of Mgr. Clément Bonnand

Ordination history of Clément Bonnand
History
Episcopal consecration
- Consecrated by: Louis-Charles-Auguste Hébert
Episcopal succession
Bishops consecrated by Clément Bonnand as principal consecrator
- Gaetano Antonio Mulsuce: 1843
- Etienne-Louis Charbonnaux: 1845
- Melchior-Marie-Joseph de Marion-Brésillac: 1846
- Joseph-Isidore Godelle: 1857

He was selected as Coadjutor by Bishop Louis-Charles-Auguste Hébert in 1831. He hesitated a long time before accepting this charge. He was consecrated on 8 November 1833 at Oulgaret in Our Lady of Victory Church. This odd place was chosen for his consecration because the diocese was hit by a heavy famine and it was feared that a lavish ceremony would result in the hatred of the starving people. Mgr. Hébert also advised not to inform about the consecration even to the priests of the vicarate. Anyhow, Mgr. Bonnand informed Fr. Surpiés. The ceremony was considered as a mean one by Bonnand himself, because he was given an old white mitre and Mgr. Hébert's cassock was adjusted to fit him. The Annals of the Propagation of the Faith mentions that Dr. Bonnand was authorized by the Holy See to send missionaries to the Maldive Islands where the Christian faith has not reached.

== Mission Press ==
Mgr. Bonnand encouraged his priests to enter into the press media. The catholic mission started their own schools and began to publish books on matter of Catholic Doctrine. Mgr. Bonnand himself published a small catechism book in 1837. Due to the usefulness this media, a new printing press was established by the mission near the cathedral in 1841. In this press, Mgr. Bonnand published a larger catechism book in 1841.

== The Synod of Pondicherry ==
The Salient point of his tenure as Vicar Apostolic, was "The Synod of Pondicherry". It took place from 18 January to 13 February 1844. It was to have a very great influence not only in India but in all the Far East. After the Synod, Father LUQUET was sent to Rome to plead for the creation of local catholic hierarchy in India, but the request was too much ahead of the time.

On 16 March 1845 the Vicariate Apostolic of Pondicherry was divided into three missions. Namely: Pondicherry, Coimbatore and Mysore. On 3 April 1850, by the Brief "Pastorale Minsisterium" Mysore and Coimbatore too, were elevated into an Apostolic Vicariate.

In 1849, Mgr Bonnad held a second synod that completed the work of the Synod of 1844.

On 13 August 1859 Mgr Bonnand was appointed by Pope Pius IX, Visitor Apostolic for all the missions in India. He left Pondicherry, never to return, on 29 November 1859. He died in Benares on 21 March 1861.

The short biography of his predecessor Mgr. Hébert, ends with the following note:" Selecting Mgr BONNAND as his successor may be considered as the greatest service he rendered to the mission." Mgr. Bonnand, was one of the most remarkable Vicar Apostolic of the MEP Society and the missions in India where he played an important role for more than 20 years.

Catholic Church titles
Preceded by Gabrijel Palković	— TITULAR — Bishop of Druzipara; 19 August 1831 – 21 March 1861	Succeeded by José Antonio de la Peña y Navarro
Preceded by Louis-Charles-Auguste Hébert as Superior of Karnatic Mission in Pondicherry	Vicar Apostolic of Pondicherry; 3 October 1836 – 21 March 1861	Succeeded by Joseph-Isidore Godelle
