= Kameeswarar temple =

Kameeswarar Temple
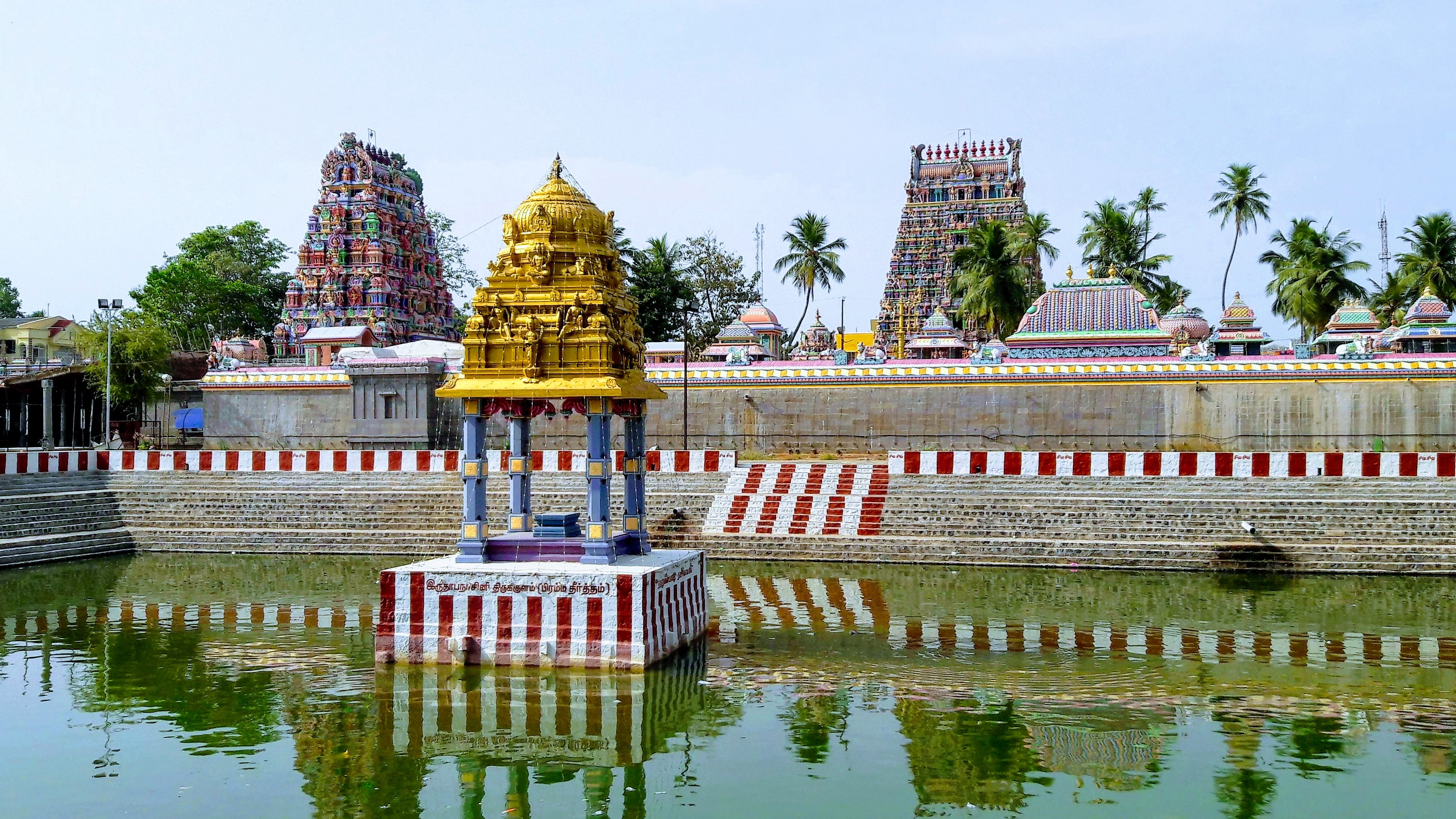

- Location in Tamil Nadu Kameeswarar temple (India)

Religion
- Affiliation: Hinduism
- Deity: Kameeswarar(Shiva)

Location
- Location: Villianur
- State: Puducherry
- Country: India
- Coordinates: 11°54′52.3″N 79°45′20.9″E

Architecture
- Type: Dravidian architecture

Thirukameeswarar Temple (also called Kokilamba - Kameeswarar temple or Villianur Temple or kameeswarar temple) is a Hindu temple dedicated to the deity Shiva, located in Villianur, a town in the South Indian union territory of Puducherry. Shiva is worshiped as Kameeswarar, and is represented by the lingam. His consort Parvati is depicted as Kokilambigai

The temple complex covers an area of two acres and all its shrines are enclosed with concentric rectangular walls.

The original complex is believed to have been built by Cholas, with later additions from different ruling dynasties. In modern times, the temple is maintained and administered by the Hindu Religious and Charitable Endowments Department of the Government of Puducherry.

== Legend and history ==
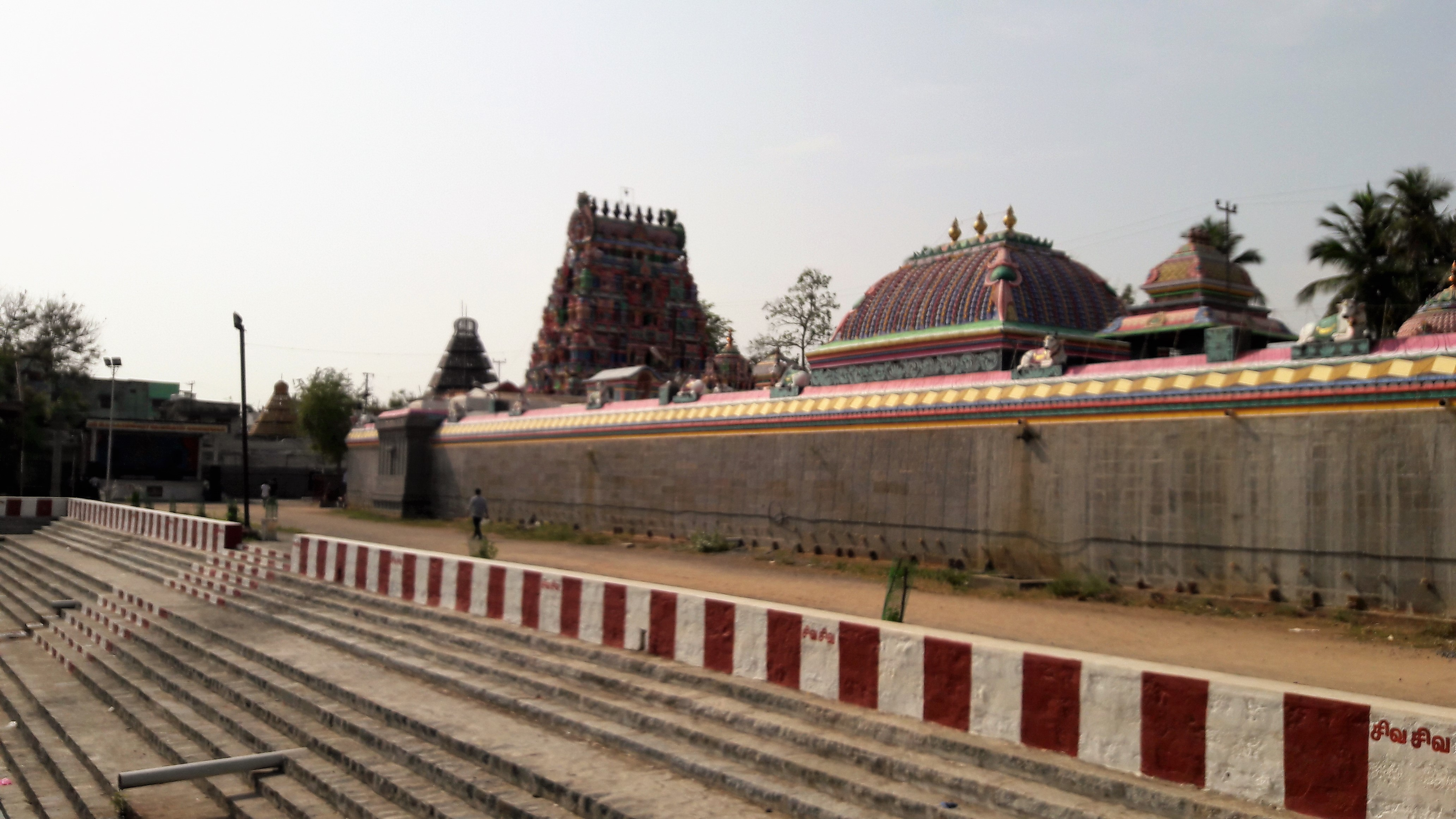
The main shrines of the temple

The original structure is believed to have been constructed during 12th century, while the later additions are believed to have been built by Medieval Cholas and Vijayanagar Empire, while the present masonry structure was built during the 16th century. There are inscriptions from Raja Narayana Sambuvarayar (1339–63), who is believed to have donated around 850 acres (340 ha) to the temple and it was irrigated by Ossudu Lake.

== Literary mention ==
U V Swaminatha Iyer, the great Tamil scholar obtained the palm manuscripts from his French friend Mulian Vensam and published the book in 1940 titled Villai Puranam written by Veeraraghava Kavi. Arunachala Kavi has written verses revering the importance of the deity Muthukumaraswamy of the temple in the book Villai Muthukumarar Pillai Tamil. Kanchipuram Sababathi Mudaliyar has published a book called Kuyilammai Malai about the temple. There are inscriptions in the temple indicating the establishment of Saiva Math by Meignana Maamunigal Swamigal.
