= Our Lady of Lourdes Shrine, Villianur =

Shrine of Our Lady of Lourdes, Villianur, Puducherry
- Sanctuaire Notre-Dame de Lourdes
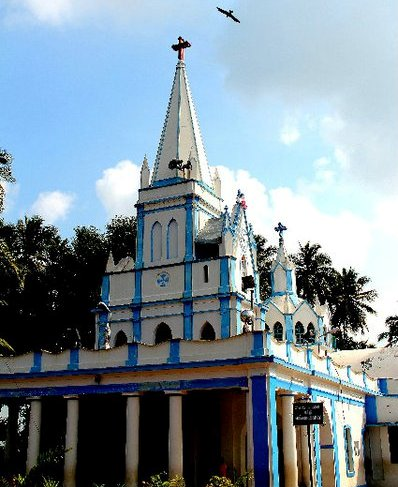
- Shrine of Our Lady of Lourdes, Villianur, Puducherry
- Shrine of Our Lady of Lourdes, Villianur, Puducherry
- 11.911262°N 79.760664°E
- Location: Villianur, Puducherry
- Country: India
- Denomination: Catholic Church
- Sui iuris church: Latin Church
- Website: https://villianurshrine.in

History
- Status: Parish church and Marian shrine
- Founded: 8 April 1877
- Dedication: Our Lady of Lourdes
- Events: 8 May 1886 - The statue was crowned in the name of Pope Leo XIII, and permanent plenary indulgence attached, declared as a Shrine.

Architecture
- Functional status: Active
- Architect(s): Father Alphonse Marie de Tarbes, M.E.P
- Architectural type: Chapel
- Style: Gothic Revival
- Groundbreaking: 1866

Administration
- Archdiocese: Pondicherry and Cuddalore
- Parish: Villianur

Clergy
- Archbishop: Most Rev. Dr. Francis Kalist
- Rector: Rev. Fr. S. Albert

The Shrine of Our Lady of Lourdes in Villianur (Latin: Templum Nostra Domina de Lapurdensis in Villianurensis) is a Roman Catholic Marian shrine and a parish church in Villianur, Puducherry, India. The shrine is dedicated to the Blessed Virgin Mary under the title of Our Lady of Lourdes.

Pope Leo XIII issued a decree of Pontifical coronation on 21 February 1886 towards the venerated Marian statue and declared the site an official Marian shrine. The former Archbishop of Pondicherry, François-Jean-Marie Laouënan executed the rite of coronation on 8 May 1886.

The venerated image was sourced in Paris, France through the pious donation of Paris Foreign Missions Society and a cousin of Marian visionary Bernadette Soubirous, Father Alphonse Marie de Tarbes was appointed parish priest of the shrine in 1866. To accommodate the growth of Marian devotees, a larger external church building was constructed near the original shrine in 2011.

== History ==
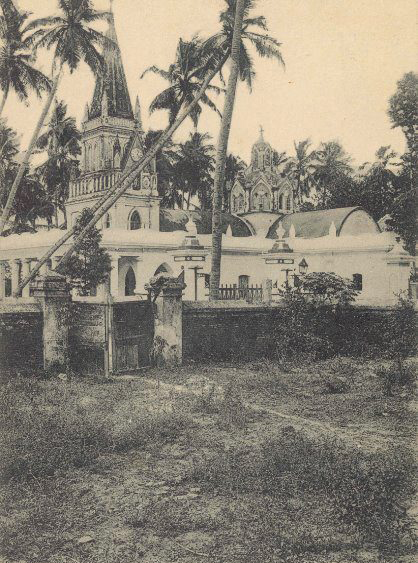
Rare old photograph of the shrine

In 1858, following the apparitions of the Blessed Virgin Mary to the Marian visionary Bernadette Soubirous in Lourdes, France, the first church and grotto dedicated to Our Lady of Lourdes outside France were constructed in Villianur.

In 1867, the missionaries of Paris Foreign Missions Society in Puducherry wished to build a Chapel at Villianur which is 13 kilometers from Pondicherry, on the road to Villupuram. Hence they bought a piece of land at Villianur and Rev. Fr. Gou, then procurator of the Puducherry mission after a long negotiation with the Hindu temple authorities of Thirukameswarer Gogilambigai Temple started to build a Chapel at Kanuvapet on the outskirts of Villianur. It is said that the building of the church was sponsored by the thanksgiving offering of Dr.Lephine's family for the miraculous cure of his daughter.

It took 10 years to complete the chapel. Father Alphonse Marie de Tarbes, a male cousin of St. Bernadette, the visionary of Lourdes, was appointed as the parish priest of Villianur mission. Since he had a direct report of the apparitions of Our Lady of Lourdes, this chapel is the first in the world to be named after Our Lady of Lourdes outside Lourdes, France.

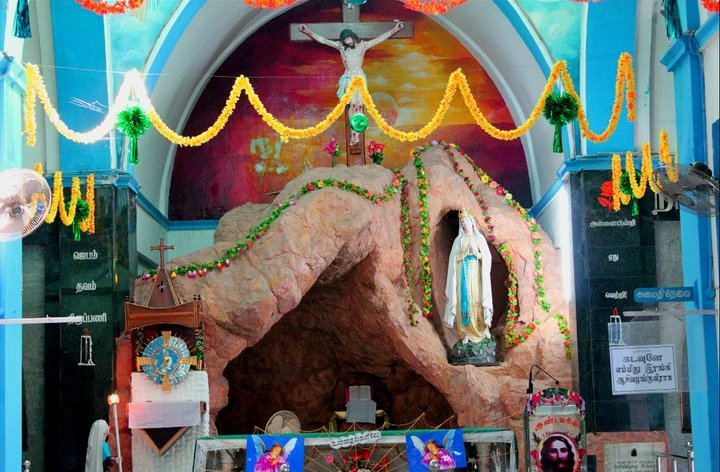
Pontifically crowned statue from 1877, donated from France by the Paris Mission Society

In 1877, with the help of St. Bernadette, a beautiful statue of Our Lady of Lourdes was brought from Lourdes, France, and installed in the chapel's grotto. The statue, associated with numerous miracles, arrived in Puducherry on 4 April 1877. The box containing the statue was dropped three times on the way to the cathedral, but arrived intact and was sent on to Villianur.

The statue was claimed to be associated with a number of miracles in the late nineteenth century. In 1885 the Archbishop François-Jean-Marie Laouënan went to Rome and provided a report of the alleged miracles that took place at the shrine to Pope Leo XIII. The archbishop received the pontifical decree on 21 February 1886 to declare the site an official shrine of Our Lady of Lourdes and to canonically crown the statue.

On the return from Rome on 8 May 1886, a Pontifical High Mass was held, with the celebration being witnessed by around 40,000 people. At the mass, the archbishop crowned the statue in the name of the pope, and declared the church as the Shrine of Our Lady of Lourdes, Villianur, attaching permanent plenary indulgences to the shrine.

=== Pond ===
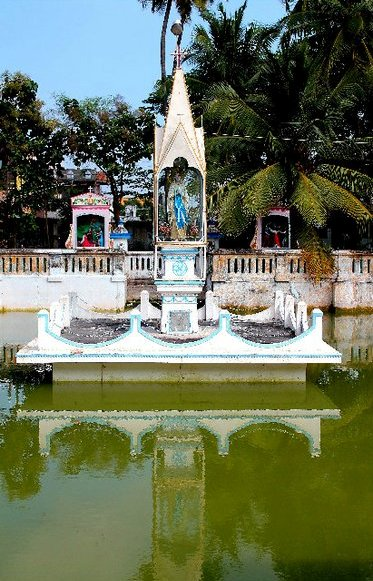
Church Pond

In 1923, walls were constructed around the pond in front of the chapel. The pond, once used as a water reservoir for the irrigation of the lands around and water came from the big Ousteri Lake which is 10 km away from here. And this pond was constructed by Fr. Lesbond, the Parish Priest, with donations from Zigon organized by Mr. Lesage. Mr. Larocgue from the people in Zigon got a statue from Lourdes and in 1924 and a solemn ceremony took place to install the statue in the middle of the sacred pond after the due consecration of the statue and the pond.

It is believed by the people here that the pond water is miraculous and has the ability to cure the sick and bring good fortune. This is the only Catholic church in Asia having a sacred pond in front of the church.

In 1930, the shrine's flagpole was installed. In 1956, a home and school for orphans were established in the name of Our Lady of Lourdes.

=== Marian grotto ===
19 years after Lourdes apparitions, the first church and grotto for Our Lady of Lourdes was constructed in 1877. The centenary celebrations was celebrated on 10 September 1977. As a remembrance of the centenary celebrations, Rev. Fr. Duissen built a big grotto in the garden of the church, which was consecrated by bishop Venmani S. Selvanather on 10 October 1978. The grotto which was inside the church was modified according as per the instruction of the Second Vatican Council.

=== 125th Anniversary ===
On 8 October 2011, on the 125th anniversary of the Pontifical coronation of the statue, Indian Archbishop Antony Anandarayar ceremoniously crowned the image once again with a diamond crown furnished and donated by its pious devotees.

=== Annual feast ===
Annual feast of Our Lady of Lourdes shrine commence with the nine days of Novena and flag hoisting on the 6th day after Easter Sunday. The car procession is done during these days. The feast day is on the 15th day after Easter. This is a Puducherry state Christian festival.

=== The Holy Water from Lourdes ===
Every first Saturday in the month of August, The Holy Water from Lourdes Church, France is poured into the 'Sacred Pond' at Villianur Shrine. This event is attended by thousands of devotees every year.

=== Pilgrimage on foot ===
As a sign of gratitude to Our Lady, for saving the city from a cyclone, the first pilgrimage on foot took place on 10 October 1977 from Pondicherry and this tradition is still continued on the second Saturday in the month of October. It starts from Immaculate Conception Cathedral, Pondicherry and ends in the shrine covering approximately 12 km.

=== Subsequent Developments ===
- In 2009, stations of the cross were established around the pond.
- In 2013, a new entrance gate to the shrine was constructed.
- A new chapel was built in 2017.
- In 2019, a grotto similar to the one in Lourdes, France, was constructed.
- In 2023, a monolithic column with an image of Our Lady of Lourdes was erected, and stations depicting the mysteries of the Rosary were installed.

== New Church ==
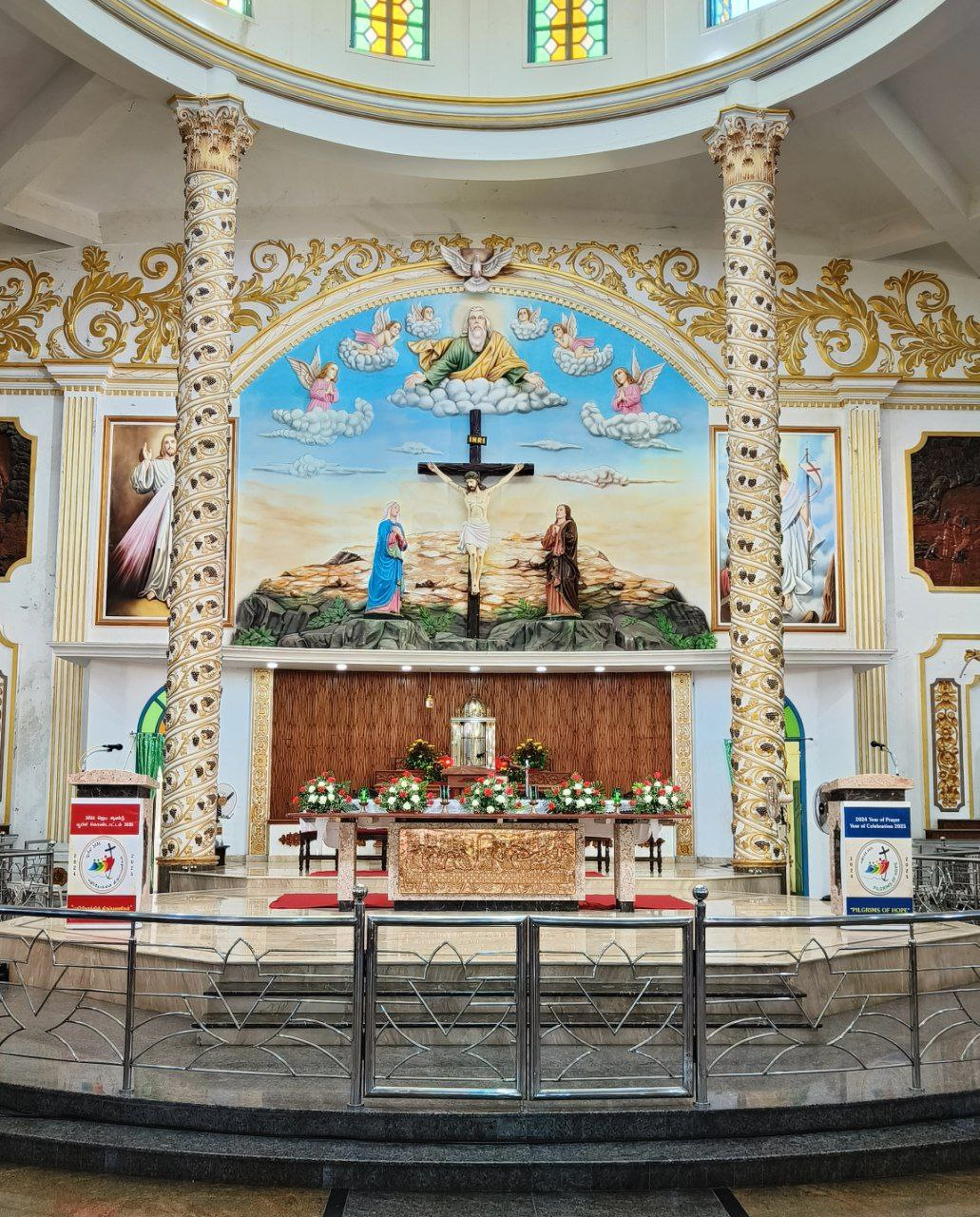
The Altar of Gratia Plena Church

As the existing Church could not accommodate the growing number of pilgrims, a new Church is planned with the approval of our Archbishop Most. Rev. Dr. Antony Anandarayar. On 10 September 2011, Rev. Fr. A. Arulanandam, the Vicar General of Archdiocese blessed and officially commenced the construction work for the Church. Rev. Fr. C. Joseph Arumaiselvam, the procurator and many other priests were present at the event. Construction was completed in 2017.

== Gallery ==
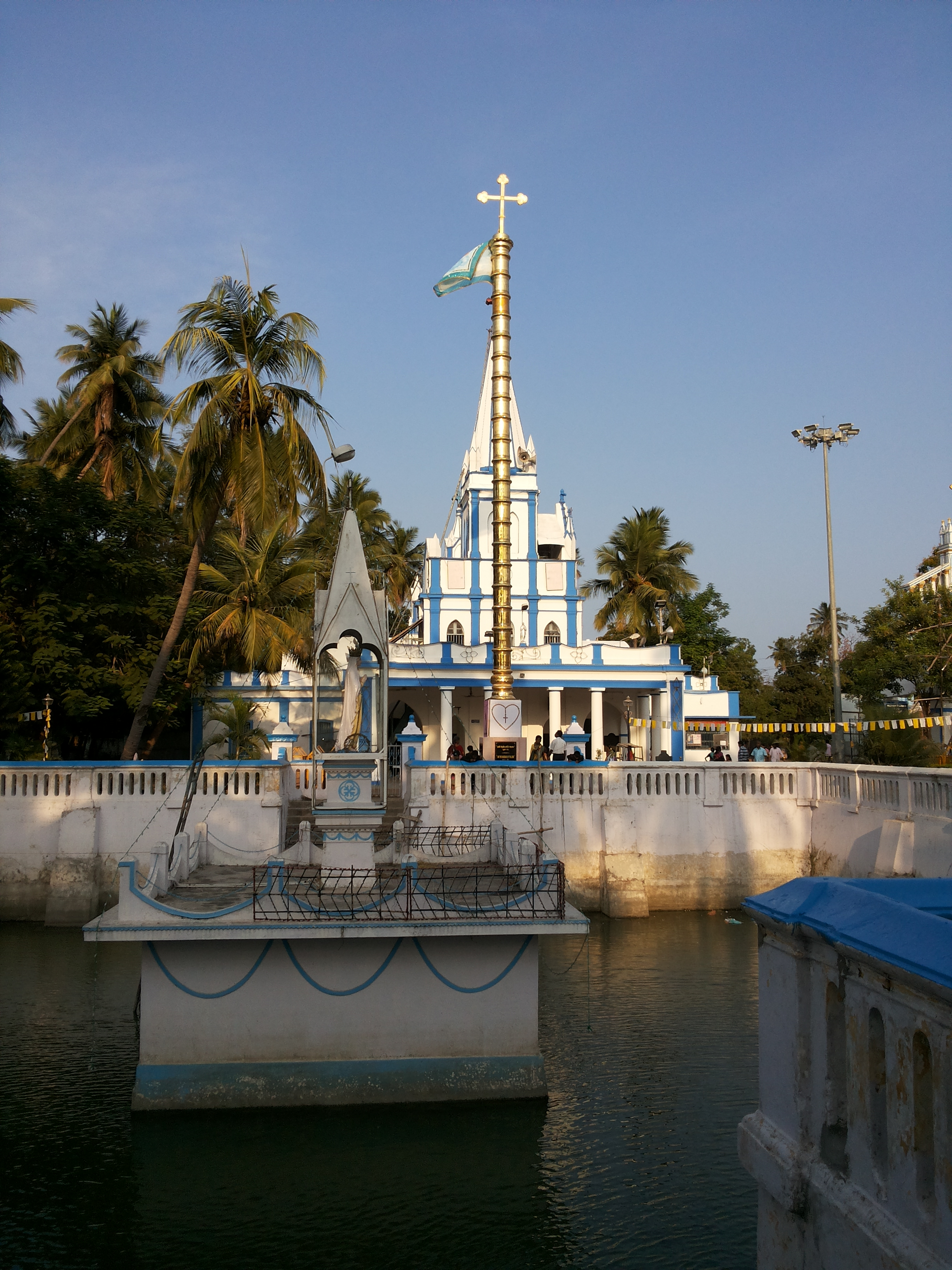
Church flagpole, renovated in 2014

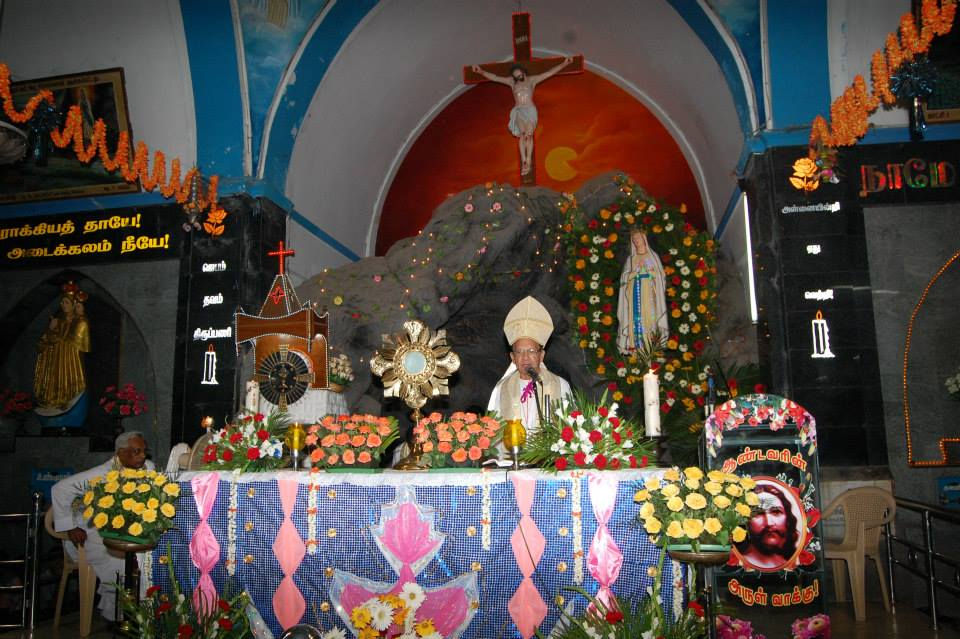
Benediction sermon by Card. Oswald Gracias

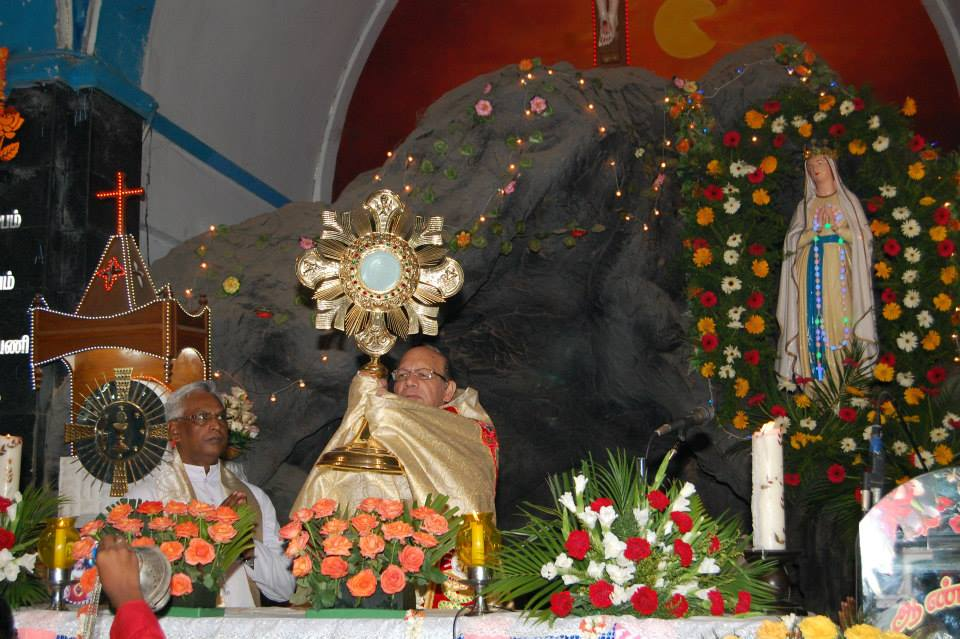
Benediction of the Blessed Sacrament

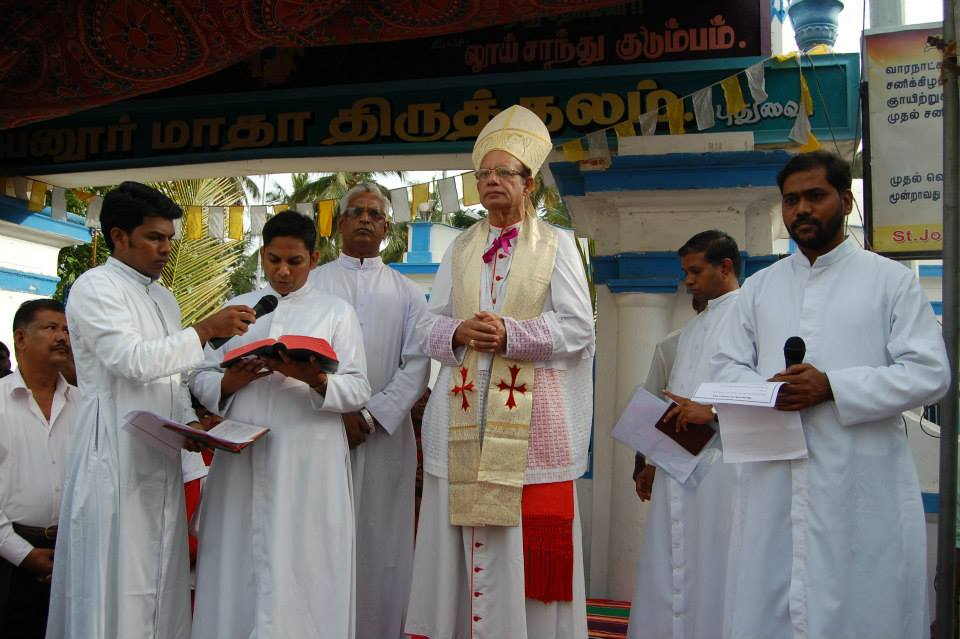
Blessing of the new gate

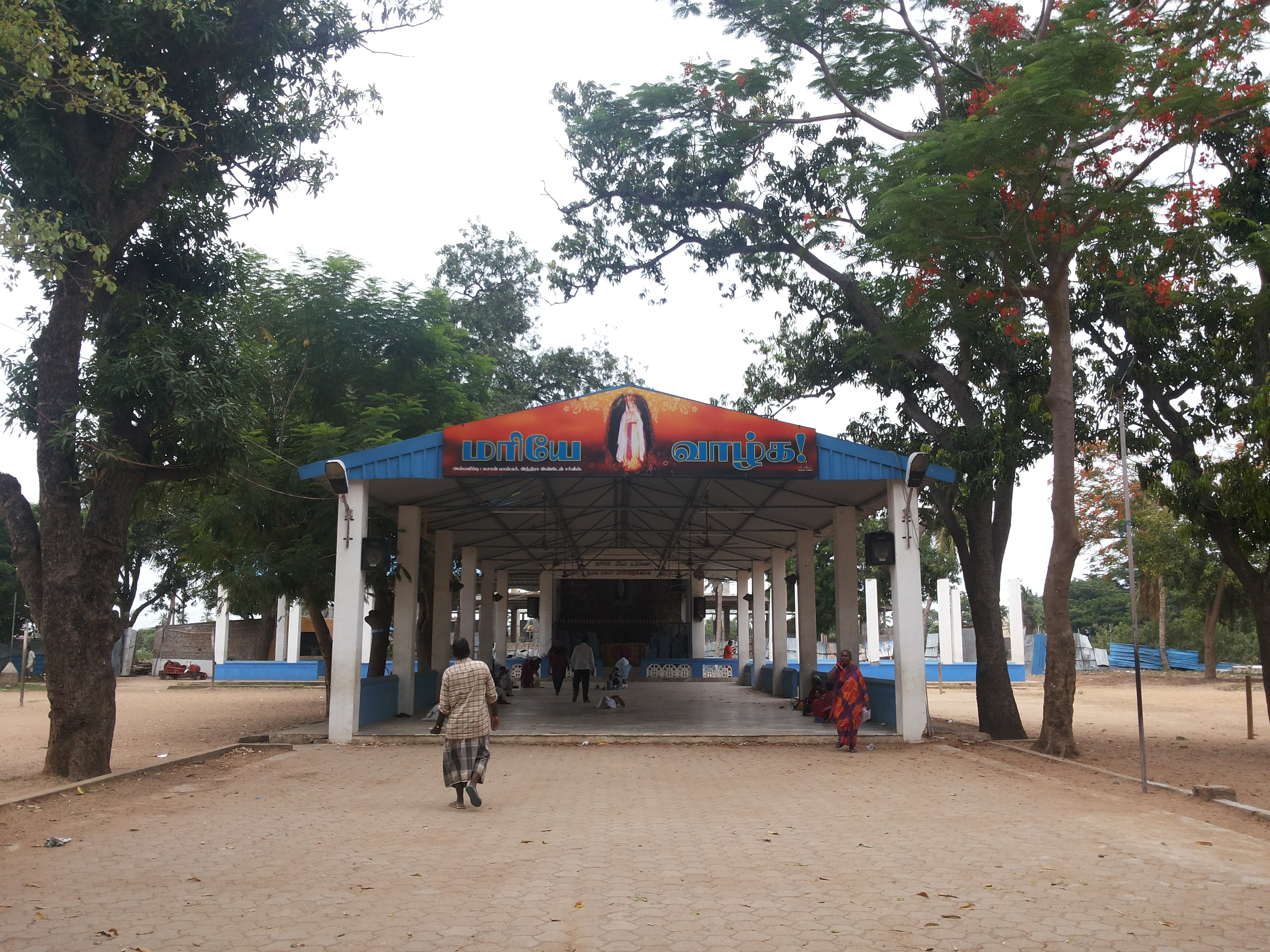
Grotto

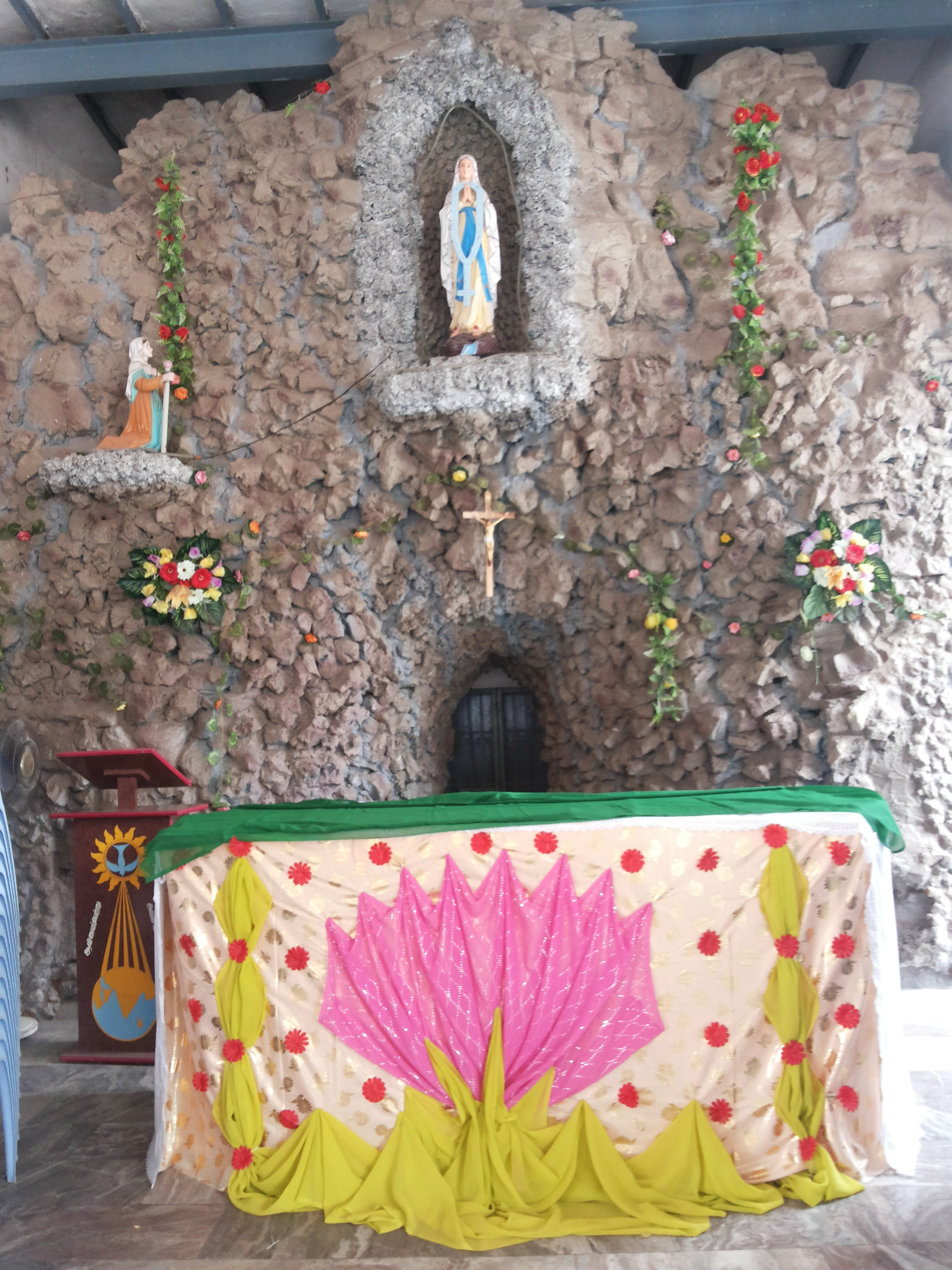
Grotto Altar

== See also ==
- Roman Catholic Archdiocese of Pondicherry and Cuddalore
- List of shrines
