= Roman Catholic Diocese of Saint Thomas of Mylapore =

Former Catholic diocese in India (1606-1952)

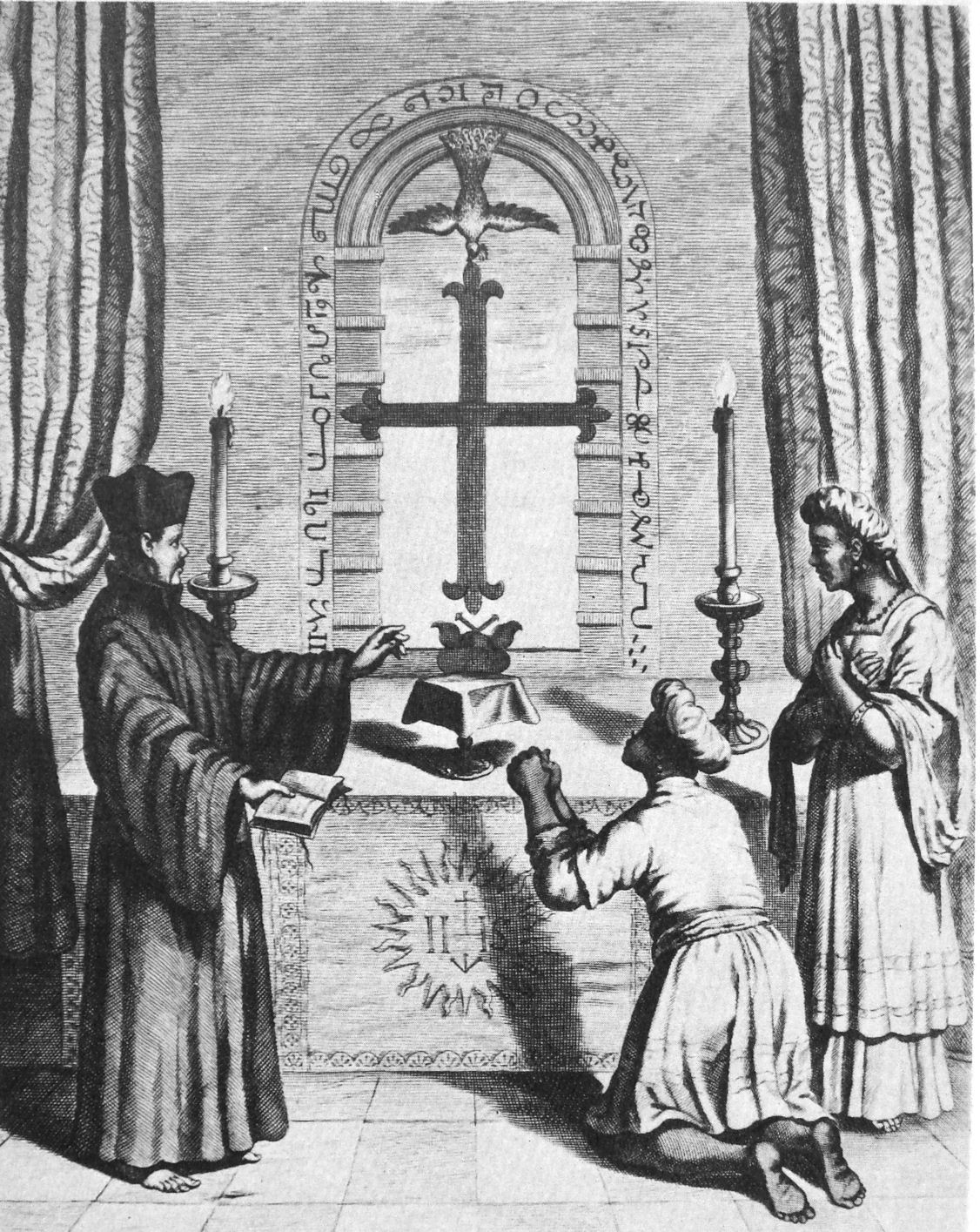
Shrine of Saint Thomas in Meliapore, 18th century print.

The Diocese of Saint Thomas of Mylapore, presently in Chennai, Tamil Nadu (Portuguese São Tomé de Meliapor; Latin Sancti Thomae de Meliapor), was a Latin Church ecclesiastical territory or diocese of the Catholic Church in India. It was a suffragan diocese in the ecclesiastical province of the Archdiocese of Goa, under the Portuguese patronage. It was founded at 1606 from the Roman Catholic Diocese of Cochin, being extinct and merger with the diocese of Madras to became the Archdiocese of Madras and Mylapore in 1952.

It was in Mylapore and derives its name from the site of its cathedral in which the Apostle St. Thomas was reportedly interred.

== Episcopal ordinaries ==
- Sebastião de São Pedro, Augustinian Order (O.E.S.A.) (9 Jan 1606 – 16 Feb 1615), next bishop of Cochin
- Luís de Brito de Menezes, O.E.S.A. (18 May 1615 – 27 May 1627), next Bishop of Cochin
- Luís Paulo de Estrela, Franciscan Third Order (T.O.R.) (10 Feb 1631 – 9 Jan 1637 Died)
- Gaspar Alphonsus Álvares, Jesuits (S.J.) (19 Dec 1691 – 24 Nov 1708 Died)
- Francisco Laynez, S.J. (24 Nov 1708 – 11 June 1715 Died)
- Manuel Sanches Golão (8 June 1718 – ?? )
- José Pinheiro, S.J. (21 Feb 1725 – 15 March 1744 Died)
- António da Encarnação, O.E.S.A. (8 March 1745 – 22 Sep 1752 Died)
- Bernardo de São Caetano, O.E.S.A. (28 May 1759 – 4 Nov 1780 Died)
- Joaquim de Meneses e Ataíde, O.E.S.A. (29 Oct 1804 Confirmed – 29 May 1820), next bishop of Elvas
- Estevão de Jesus Maria da Costa, Friars Minor (O.F.M.) (3 July 1826 – 28 Jan 1828), next Bishop of Angra
- António Tristão Vaz Teixeira (1836 – 1852)
- Henrique José Reed da Silva (14 March 1887 – 12 August 1897 Resigned)
- António José de Sousa Barroso (11 Oct 1897 – 23 May 1899), next bishop of Porto
- Teotónio Emanuel Ribeiro Vieira de Castro (22 June 1899 – 25 May 1929), next Archbishop of Goa e Damão
- António Maria Teixeira (25 May 1929 – 15 March 1933 Died)
- Carlos de Sá Fragoso (4 Dec 1933 – 10 April 1937 Resigned)
- Manuel de Medeiros Guerreiro (10 April 1937 – 2 March 1951), next Bishop of Nampula.
- Extinction – 1952

== See also ==
- List of Catholic dioceses in India
- Catholic Church in India
- São Tomé de Meliapore, an overlapping territory that existed from 1523 to 1749
