= Patrick Joseph Carew =

Vicar Apostolic of Western Bengal

Most Reverend Patrick Carew
- Vicar Apostolic of Western Bengal
- Church: Catholic Church
- Diocese: Apostolic Vicariate of Western Bengal
- Predecessor: Jean-Louis Taberd
- Successor: Marc-Thomas Oliffe
- Previous posts: Vicar Apostolic of Madras (1838–1840); Vicar Apostolic of Bengal (1840–1850)

Orders
- Consecration: 24 June 1838 by John Murphy

Personal details
- Born: Patrick Joseph Carew; 1800 Waterford, Ireland
- Died: 2 November 1855 (age 55) Calcutta, Bengal, British India
- Education: St. Patrick's College, Maynooth

Most Rev. Patrick Joseph Carew (1800 – 2 November 1855) was the Vicar Apostolic of Western Bengal.

== Biography ==
Patrick Joseph Carew was born in Waterford, Ireland. Carew studied for the priesthood in Maynooth, he was appointed Professor of Humanity in 1826. On 6 March 1838, Pope Gregory XVI appointed him Vicar Apostolic of Madras and Titular Bishop of Philadelphia in Arabia.

On 24 June 1838, he was consecrated bishop by John Murphy, Bishop of Cork with Nicholas Foran, Bishop of Waterford and Lismore, and Francis Haly, Bishop of Kildare and Leighlin as Co-Consecrators. On 4 April 1840, he succeeded to the Vicar Apostolic of Madras replacing Bishop Daniel O'Connor.

On 30 November 1840, he was appointed Vicar Apostolic of Bengal and Titular Archbishop of Edessa in Osrhoëne. In 1850, the name of the vicariate was changed to the Vicariate Apostolic of Western Bengal. After several months of illness, Carew died on 2 November 1855 at the Archbishop's residence in Calcutta, aged 55.
