= Étienne-Louis Charbonnaux =

Bishop Etienne-Louis Charbonnaux M.E.P.
- Vicar Apostolic of Mysore
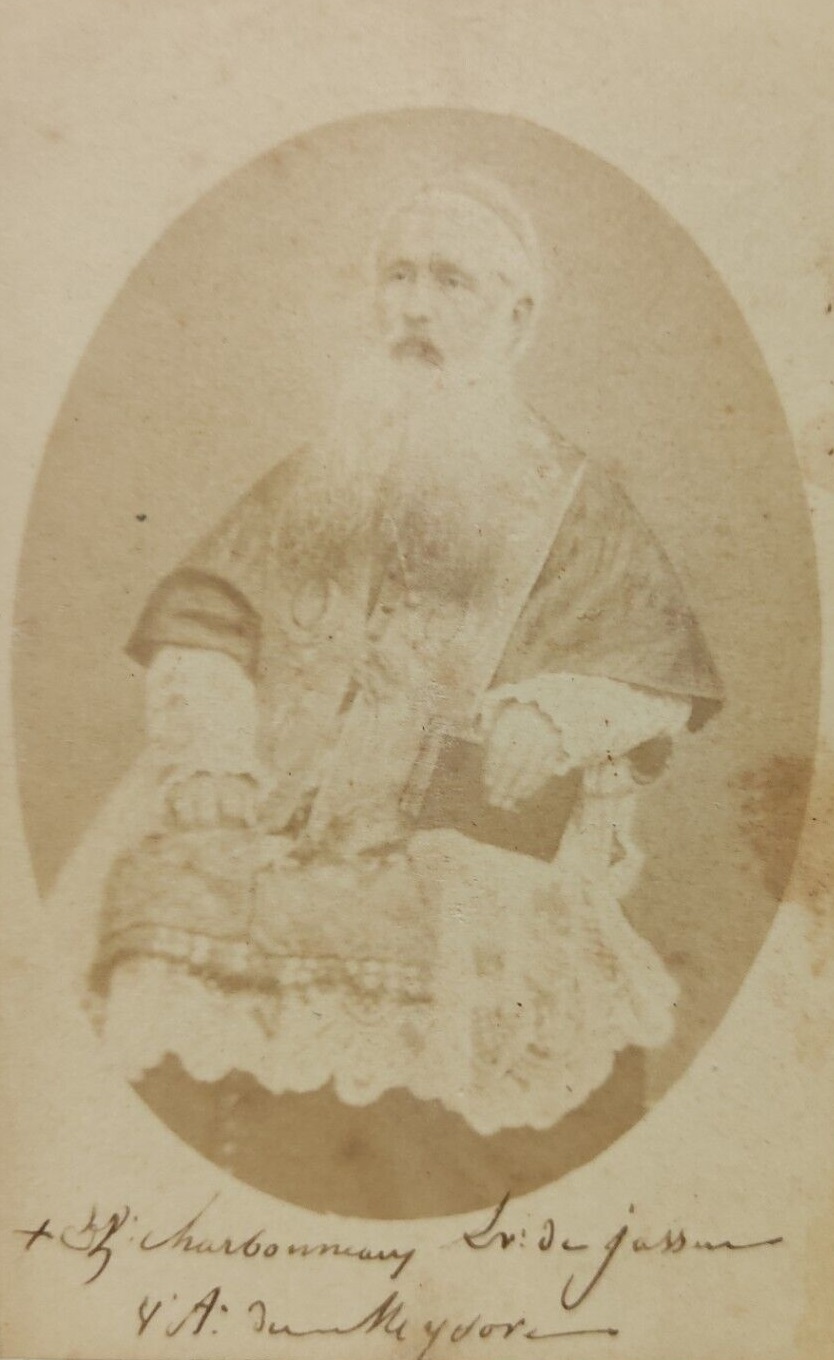
- See: Mysore

Orders
- Ordination: 5 June 1830
- Consecration: 29 June 1845 by Clément Bonnand

Personal details
- Born: Etienne-Louis Charbonnaux; 20 March 1806 La Guerche-de-Bretagne, France
- Died: 23 June 1873 (aged 67) Bangalore, India
- Denomination: Catholic

Ordination history of Étienne-Louis Charbonnaux
History
Episcopal consecration
- Principal consecrator: Clément Bonnand
- Co-consecrators: John Fennelly
Episcopal succession
Bishops consecrated by Étienne-Louis Charbonnaux as principal consecrator
- François-Jean-Marie Laouënan: 1868

Étienne-Louis Charbonnaux (20 March 1806 La Guerche-de-Bretagne France – 22 June 1873 Bangalore India) was a French missionary and the first vicar apostolic of Mysore, India.

== Early life ==
Étienne-Louis Charbonneaux was born on 20 March 1806 in La Guerche-de-Bretagne, France.

== Career ==
=== Priest ===
Charbonnaux entered the seminary in the city of Angers, France. Afterwards, he was ordained a priest in the Société des Missions Etrangères (MEP) on 5 June 1830. On 16 August of the same year, he left France for the Malabar Mission in Pondicherry, India.

After a short stay in Karaikal, he was sent to Srirangapattana, capital city of the Mysore kingdom, where he ministered to a congregation of 3,500 Catholics. Charbonnaux showed such devotion during a famine that an English official wrote him a letter of congratulations and gratitude, saying that he "had indeed become the father and the benefactor of the people".

=== Bishop ===
Charbonnaux's first priority was the education of natives. During these years, however, he learned English, Tamil, and Kannada by himself. He was named titular Bishop of Jassen in 1841, although he refused the position and wrote an abrupt letter, citing the "mediocre services" available to the natives. He, then, traveled through the region to his first Synod of Pondicherry in 1844. His election was confirmed in July 1844, and Mgr. Clément Bonnand consecrated him as a bishop in Pondicherry on 29 June 1845.

=== Administrator ===
By the mid-1840s, Mysore became established as a distinct mission, though not yet as an apostolic vicariate. Charbonnaux was named Administrator for Mysore on 16 March 1845. After his Episcopal consecration, he left again for Bengaluru, the main Catholic center of the kingdom. At that time, he had six missionaries and 13,500 Christians under his direction. Approximately 250 conversions took place per year.

On 7 October 1846, he laid the cornerstone of his seminary. The early years at the seminary were difficult. From 1845 through 1859, 200 children were accepted to the seminary, but only three were eventually ordained as priests. The syllabus for studies was later corrected and expanded.

In 1847, Charbonnaux set the borders of his mission on the side of Madagondanahalli and on Dasarahalli, to the southeast of Bengaluru. Shortly afterwards, he established a Kannada printing unit and published several books on religion and teaching methods, composed in collaboration with several other missionaries.

=== Reformer ===
In 1849, Charbonnaux held a significant position at the second synod of Pondicherry, speaking at all the meetings. From 1848 to 1851, he and the priests in the region tried to find ways to increase the Christian population and to convert the prominent Hindu population. They examined the question of the formalities of marriage and of the catechists. Following these conferences, he published the Usual of Mysore.

On 3 April 1850, Mysore having been established as apostolic vicarage, Charbonnaux became the apostolic chaplain.

His job of general administration neither stopped nor diminished his pastoral visits. His work as a missionary continued while he carried out the duties of being a bishop. His work allowed him to soothe quarrels between Indians, to confess, and to preach. "A good preacher", he once said, "is the one who, putting on within the reach of intelligence and needs of his audience, teaches well and touches curs".

=== Social worker ===
In 1853, Charbonnaux returned to Europe. On this visit, he sought the services of the nuns of the Good Shepherd of Angers for his mission in India. The nuns established their presence in Bengaluru in 1854 and later in Mysore. In 1859, on his advice, the nuns organised the Congregation of Saint Ann, composed of nuns from the native population.

Charbonnaux also founded many orphanages. For example, the Saint Joseph's High School of Bengaluru continues today as an educational institute for boys. In addition, he was in very good relations with the Rajah of Mysore, who met with him several times. At the same time, the English commissioner for Mysore, Lewis Bowring, was closely associated with him.

=== Apostle ===
After the death of Mgr. Bonnand, Charbonnaux was charged to continue the apostolic missions of India and Burma from July 1861 until November 1862.

On 17 June 1867, Pius IX invited him to Rome, on the occasion of the prelate's ascension to the pontifical throne. In 1870, Charbonnaux took part in the council of Vatican City and was a member of the Commission of Oriental Ritual. At the same time, with other apostolic chaplains he studied the Regulations of the Society of MEP. The aim was to create a final draft, which was actually something he had already begun in 1859, at conferences of Salem. He went back to Mysore in 1871, where he worked until his death.

He died in Bengaluru on 23 June 1873, after 43 years in the priesthood. 27 of those 43 years were as a bishop.

== Writings ==
- Usual of the mission of Mysore. – 1851, in-8, pp. 82 the tab;
- nouv. decree. 1866, in-8, pp. 86.
- Memorandum on the needs of the mission of Mysore (East Indies), addressed to MM. the presidents and members of both Councils of the Œuvre de la Propagation de la Foi. – from the printing of Lainé brothers, 9, rue Saint-Laud, Angers, August 1853, in-8, pp. 24.
- Dictionarium Latino Canarense. – 1861, in-8, pp. xx + 11 + 3 + 1179.
- Viyakarana Kannada latin (Grammaire Kannada latine).
- Modalane Patha (First Lessons).
- Eradane Patha (Second Lessons).
- Divya Matruke (The Devine Model). – 1862, in-18, pp. 390.
- Purvika Matada Vyakyana (Explication de l'ancienne religion).
- Shiloube Hadi (Way of the Cross).
- Agnatavasada Dhyana (Manrèse ou Exercices de Saint-Ignace). – 1865, in-12, pp. 220.
- Veda Bodhakara krama (Règles du catéchiste) [auteur : Beschi]. – 2nd Edition, 1878, pp. 196.
- Gnana Darpana (Le miroir spirituel). – 1879, in-8, pp. 112.
- Satyavedada Parikshe (Examen de la vraie religion). – 2nd Edition, 1880, in-8, pp. 336.
- Loka Maduve Prastada Kramavu (Mandement contenant les règles sur les cérémonies du mariage). – 2nd Edition, Morning Star Press, Bengaluru, 1894, in-8, pp. 28.
- Japada dodda Pustakavu (Grand livre de prières). – 2nd Edition, 1897, in-8, pp. 546.
- Id. – Nouv. Edition, imprimerie Codiaboil, Mangalore.
- Japada chikka Pustakavu (Petit livre de prières). – Nouv. Edition, imprimerie Codialbile, Mangalore, 1897, in-12, pp. 386.
- Diyva Parikshe (Examen de la Divinité). – 3rd Edition, 1898, in-8, pp. 142.
- Patitara Marga (La voie des hérétiques). – 2nd Edition, 1898, in-8, pp. 262.

== Bibliography ==
- The very Rev. J. A. Chevalier pro-vicar (1899). A biographical sketch of the late Right Rev. Charbonneau [sic] Bishop of Jassen and first Vicar Apostolic of the provinces of Mysore and Coorg of the East Indies. Printed at the Bengaluru Examiner press, by L. J. G. Santineer printer, Bengaluru, 1874, in-8, 2 ff. n ch. + pp. 42 Oxford, Clarendon press.
