= Moyne, County Tipperary =

Civil parish in County Tipperary, Ireland

Coordinates: 52.3242°N 7.3641°W

Moyne is a civil parish in the barony of Eliogarty in County Tipperary, Ireland. It is one of 21 civil parishes in the barony. It is the easternmost parish of barony located between the parish of Rahelty to the west and the county of Kilkenny to the east. It contains twelve townlands. According to Lewis' "Topographical Dictionary", in 1837 it contained 224 inhabitants and comprised 7172 statute acres that were valued at £6677 per annum. The Tipperary GAA club of Moyne–Templetuohy GAA is partly based in the parish.
