= Garrison Church =

Garrison Church may refer to:

- All Saints Garrison Church, Lucknow, India
- Christ Church, Yokohama, Japan
- Church of St. John the Evangelist (Toronto), Canada
- CSI Garrison Wesley Church, Secunderabad, India
- Domus Dei, or Royal Garrison Church, Portsmouth, England
- Garrison Church, Copenhagen, Denmark
- Garrison Church, Potsdam, Germany
- Garrison Church, Sydney, Australia
- Garrison Church of St Alban the Martyr, Larkhill
- Malta Stock Exchange, Valletta, Malta, which was built as the Garrison Church
- Royal Garrison Church, Aldershot, England
- St Andrew's Garrison Church, Aldershot, England
- St George's Garrison Church, Woolwich, England
- St. Michael the Archangel Church, Kaunas, Lithuania
- St. Thomas Garrison Church, Chennai, India
- Saints Peter and Paul Garrison Church (Lviv), Ukraine
