= St. Thomas Mount =

Hillock in Chennai, Tamil Nadu, India

St. Thomas Mount பரங்கிமலை (Parangimalai)
- Neighbourhood
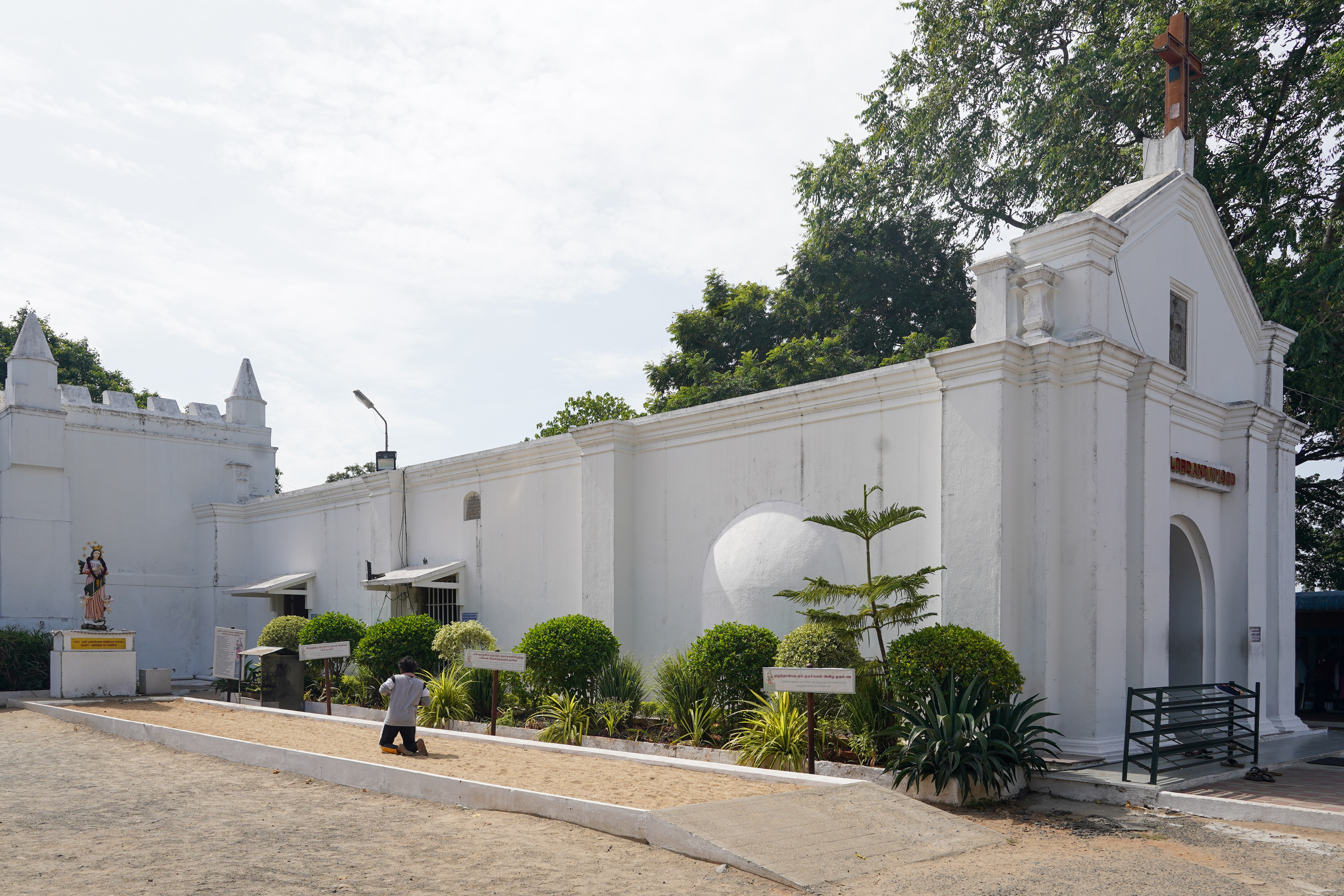
- St Thomas Church on the Mount

- Location within Chennai Location within Tamil Nadu
- Coordinates: 13°00′28.1″N 80°11′33.0″E
- Country: India
- State: Tamil Nadu
- Metro: Chennai

Government
  - Body: St.Thomas Mount-cum-Pallavaram

Area
  - Total: 12.92 km^{2} (4.99 sq mi)
- Elevation: 91.44 m (300.0 ft)

Population (2011)
  - Total: 43,795
  - Density: 3,390/km^{2} (8,779/sq mi)

Languages
  - Official: Tamil
- Time zone: UTC+5:30 (IST)
- Planning agency: CMDA

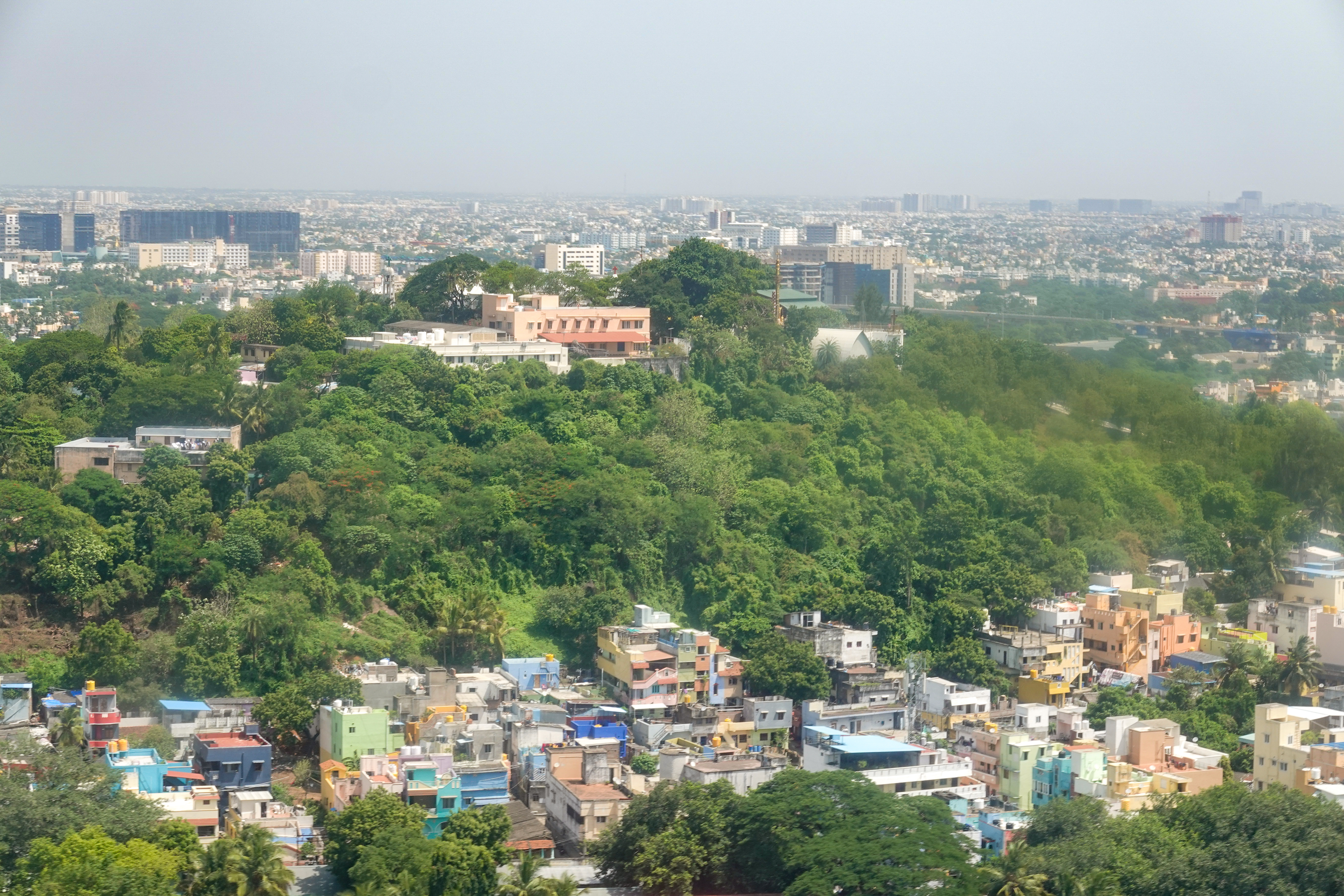
Aerial view of St. Thomas Mount from the southeast

St. Thomas Mount (also known as Parangimalai) is a small hillock in the Chennai district of Tamil Nadu, India, near the neighbourhood of Guindy and close to Chennai International Airport. By extension, it is also the name of the neighbourhood surrounding the hillock.

The neighbourhood is served by the Chennai Metro and the St. Thomas Mount railway station, on the South line of the Chennai Suburban Railway and the Chennai MRTS.

== History ==
Historically, St. Thomas Mount was also known as Periya Malai (பெரிய மலை, meaning “Great Hill or Mount”) in Tamil and Monte Grande (“Great Mount”) in Portuguese, distinguishing it from the nearby Chinna Malai (“Little Mount”).The hill is also known locally as Parangimalai (பரங்கிமலை). The Madras Journal of Literature and Science (1887–1888) explains this name as “the Mountain of the Franks or Europeans,” associating it with the early Portuguese settlement.

The area is closely associated with local traditions. According to Hindu tradition, the sage Bhringi resided and meditated on the hillock in his quest to see Shiva. The locality thus came to be known as Bhringi malai, or "the hill of Bhringi", which over time morphed into "Parangimalai". It is also said that this connects several other regions in the city with the origin of their names. For instance, the place where he laid his pitcher, known in Tamil as kindi while performing worship, has now come to be known as "Guindy".

According to Christian traditions, the hill is the site where St. Thomas the Apostle was martyred in 72 AD after being struck with a spear. In 1523, the Portuguese missionary Diego Fernandes built a small oratory on the Mount, reportedly over the foundations of an earlier church. As the number of pilgrims grew, Gaspar Coelho, the Vicar of the Church of Mylapore, laid the foundation for a larger church in 1547 and dedicated it to Our Lady of the Mount. The church is believed to have served as a lighthouse for Portuguese and Armenian ships during the 16th century.

In 1802, William Lambton, the surveyor responsible for launching the Great Trigonometrical Survey of India, began his work from the plateau of St. Thomas Mount. In 1830, the St. Thomas Garrison Church was built to serve British soldiers of the Madras Artillery, which was headquartered in the area since 1774.

In 1962, Archbishop Louis Mathias of Madras-Mylapore oversaw the laying of an asphalt road to the summit, and by 1963, a calvary was installed atop the hill, overlooking the city.

In the state assembly elections of 1967 and 1971, there was a constituency known as St. Thomas Mount.

In 1986, Pope John Paul II visited the St. Thomas Mount Church.

== Governance ==
The St. Thomas Mount block is a revenue block in the Chengalpattu district of Tamil Nadu, India. As per the Census 2011, the St. Thomas Mount development block covered an area of 86.94 km^{2} (33.57 sq mi), of which 42.98 km^{2} (16.59 sq mi) was classified as rural and 43.96 km^{2} (16.97 sq mi) as urban. The block included 121,017 household with a total population of 475,995. The sex ratio was 978.7 females per 1,000 males. The number of children in the age group 0–6 years was 55,103. Scheduled castes numbered 74,322 (15.6%) and scheduled tribes were 2.544 (0.53%). The literacy rate was 77.6%, with males at 81.3% and females at 73.9%.

The following 15 rural village panchayats and part of Greater Chennai Corporation come under St Thomas Mount Panchayat Union:

1. Agaramthen
2. Medavakkam
3. Kovilambakkam
4. Cowl Bazaar
5. Mudichur
6. Perumbakkam
7. Nanmangalam
8. Polichalur
9. Tirusulam
10. Ottyambakkam
11. Thiruvanchery
12. Vengaivasal
13. Madurapakkam
14. Moovarasampattu
15. Sithalapakkam
16. Greater Chennai Corporation - Madipakkam-B / Madipakkam-II revenue village (under Zone-14, Puzhutivakkam of GCC). For this revenue village, Revenue and Disaster Management is under GCC, local body administration is under St. Thomas Mount Panchayat Union through Kovilambakkam rural village panchayat

== Hill shrine ==
A shrine dedicated to Our Lady of Expectation stands at the summit of St. Thomas Mount, marking the site where St. Thomas is traditionally believed to have been martyred. In 2011, the shrine was formally granted "national shrine" status by the Catholic Bishops’ Conference of India, recognising its historical and religious significance, and was designated a minor basilica in 2025.

A flight of 134 steps, built in 1726 and donated by Armenian merchant Coja Petrus Uscan, leads up to the summit, where 14 Stations of the Cross are positioned along the path. The northern foot of the mount features a gateway of four arches, surmounted by a cross with an inscription dating it to 1547. The area also includes the St. Thomas Garrison Church at the base and the St. Thomas Syro-Malabar Church, east of the shrine at North Silver Street.

== Geology ==
St. Thomas Mount lies within the high‑grade metamorphic belt of southern India known as the Southern Granulite Terrain (SGT), specifically the "Madras block.

The dominant rock exposed at the Mount is a typical representative of the charnockite series, a hypersthene-bearing quartz–feldspar granulite characteristic of high‑grade granulite-facies metamorphism.

As a result of these exposures, the rock outcrop at St. Thomas Mount has been declared a national monument by the Geological Survey of India, promoting it for study and geotourism.

== Educational institutions ==
St. Thomas Mount has several schools and training institutions.

=== Schools ===
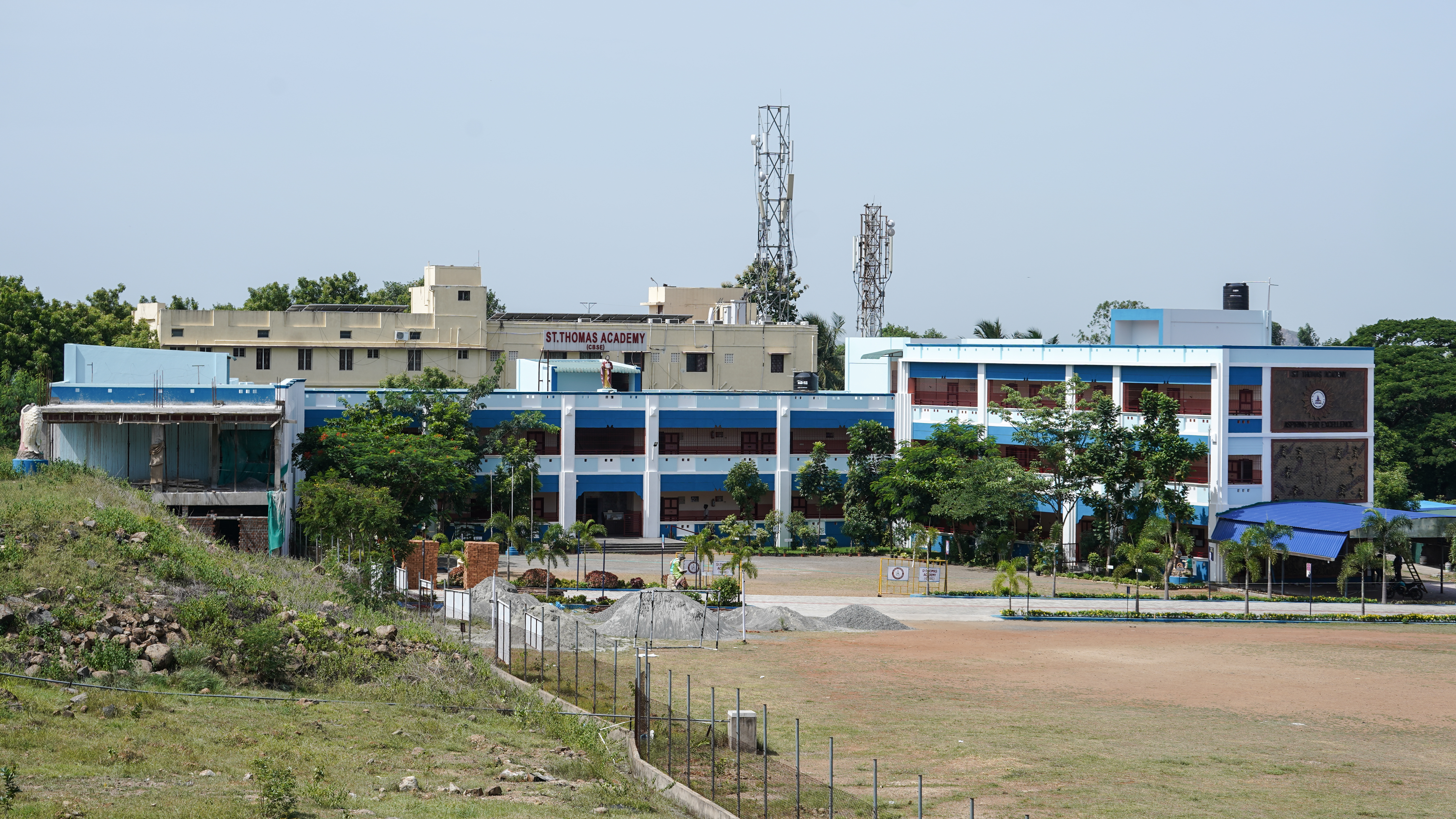
St Thomas Academy (ca. Aug. '22)

- St. Dominic's Anglo-Indian Higher Secondary School was founded in July 1901 as Holy Apostles Convent European School for children of the British and Anglo Indian Army Personnel. In 1914 it was renamed as St Dominic's School. In 1978 Class 12 was added.
- Marian Matriculation Higher Secondary School is an English medium, co-educational senior secondary school from lower kindergarten (LKG) to class 12.
- St. Thomas Academy is an English medium, co-educational higher secondary school started in July 2017 and by 2022 had about 400 students. It is affiliated with the Central Board of Secondary Education (CBSE).
- Montfort Matriculation Higher Secondary School is a highly regarded institution that opened in 2002 at this location. Presently, the school has 2500+ students from kindergarten to grade twelve.

=== Vocational training institutes ===
- St. Theresa of Child Jesus School of Nursing is located in St. Thomas Hospital. Started in 1993, by 2012 it was admitting 20 students annually.
- Montfort Technical Institute is a private industrial training institute (ITI). Established in Jan 1972, it is one of 326 private ITIs in the state of Tamil Nadu.

== Gallery ==
=== Exterior of the church ===
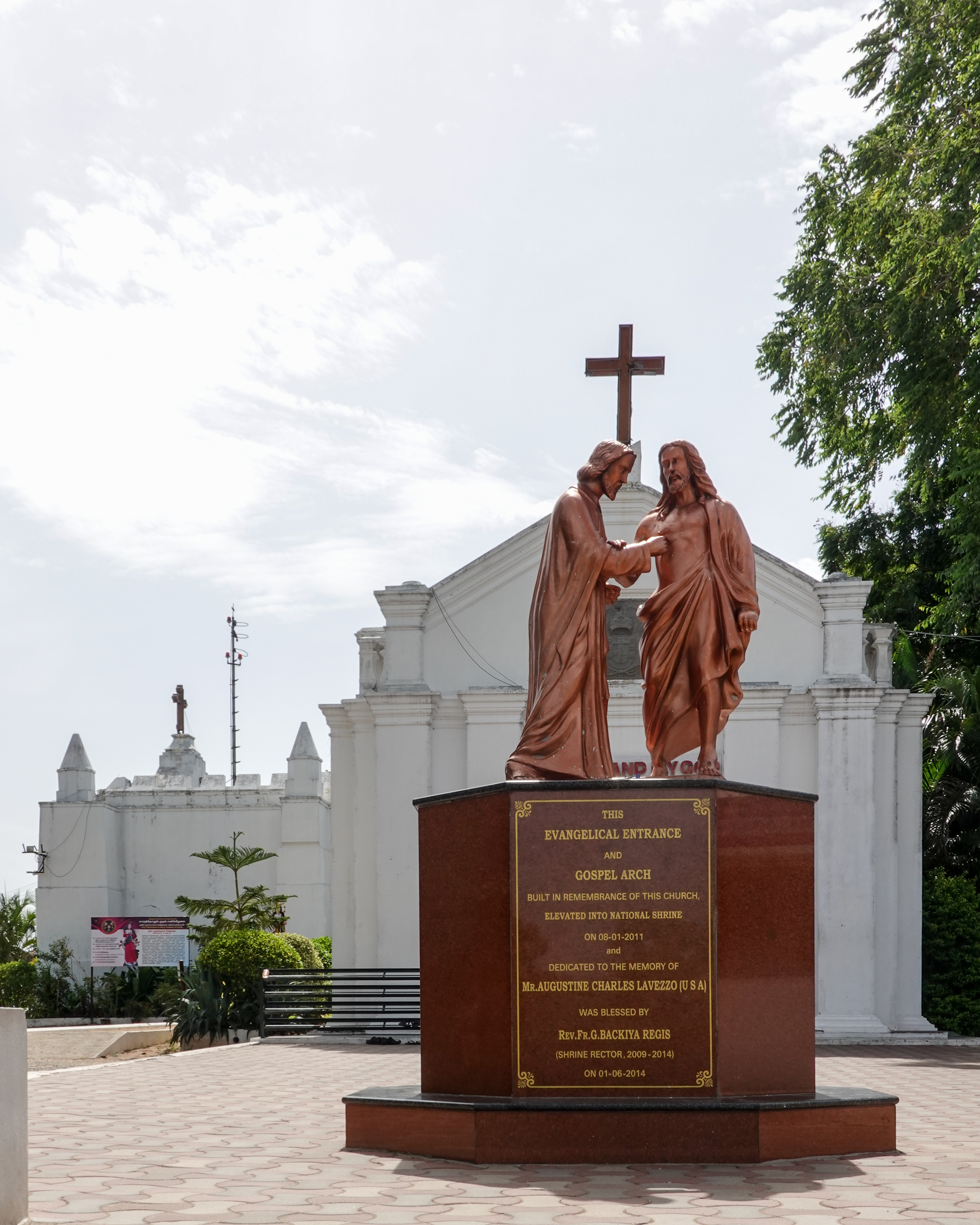
Entrance to the shrine

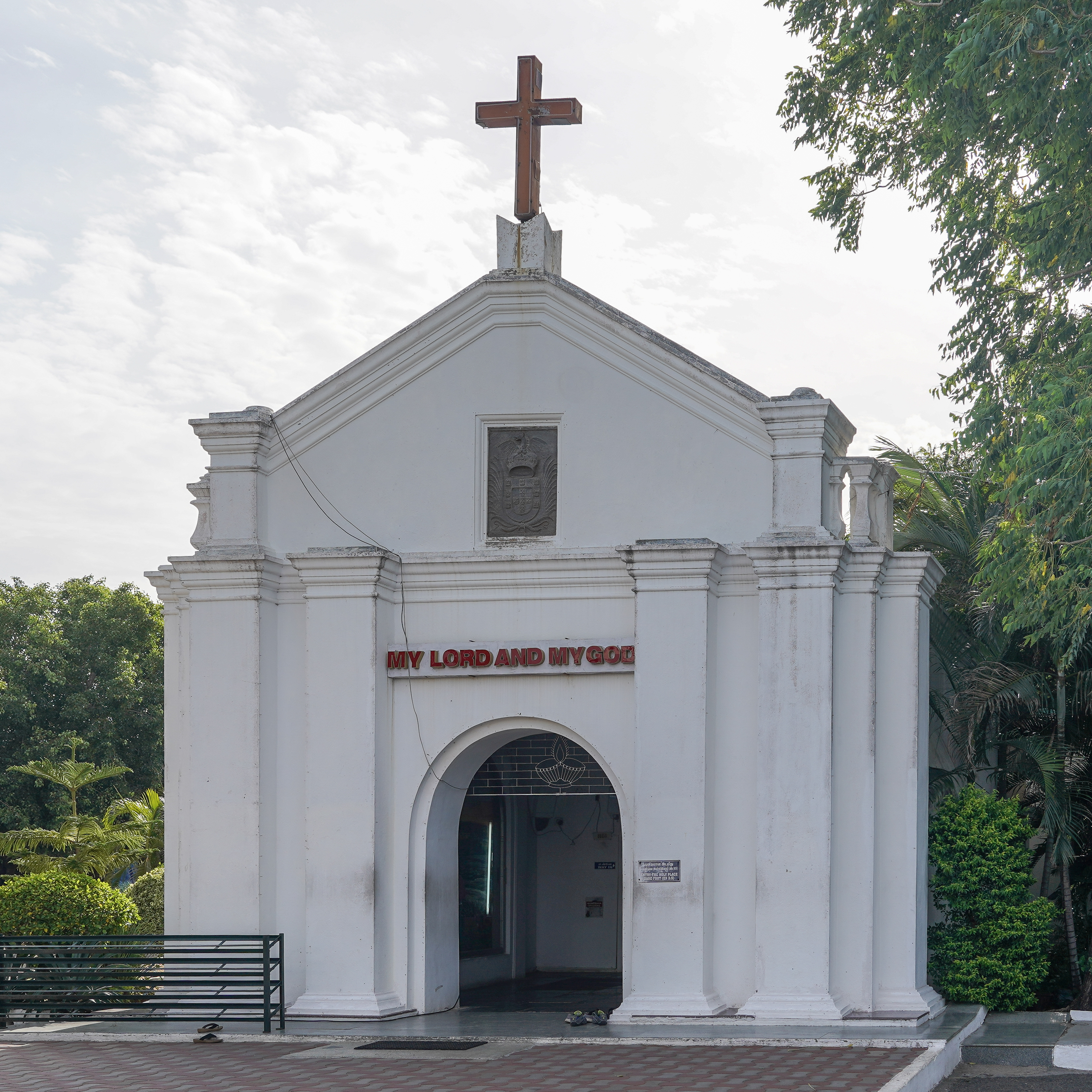
Main entrance to the church

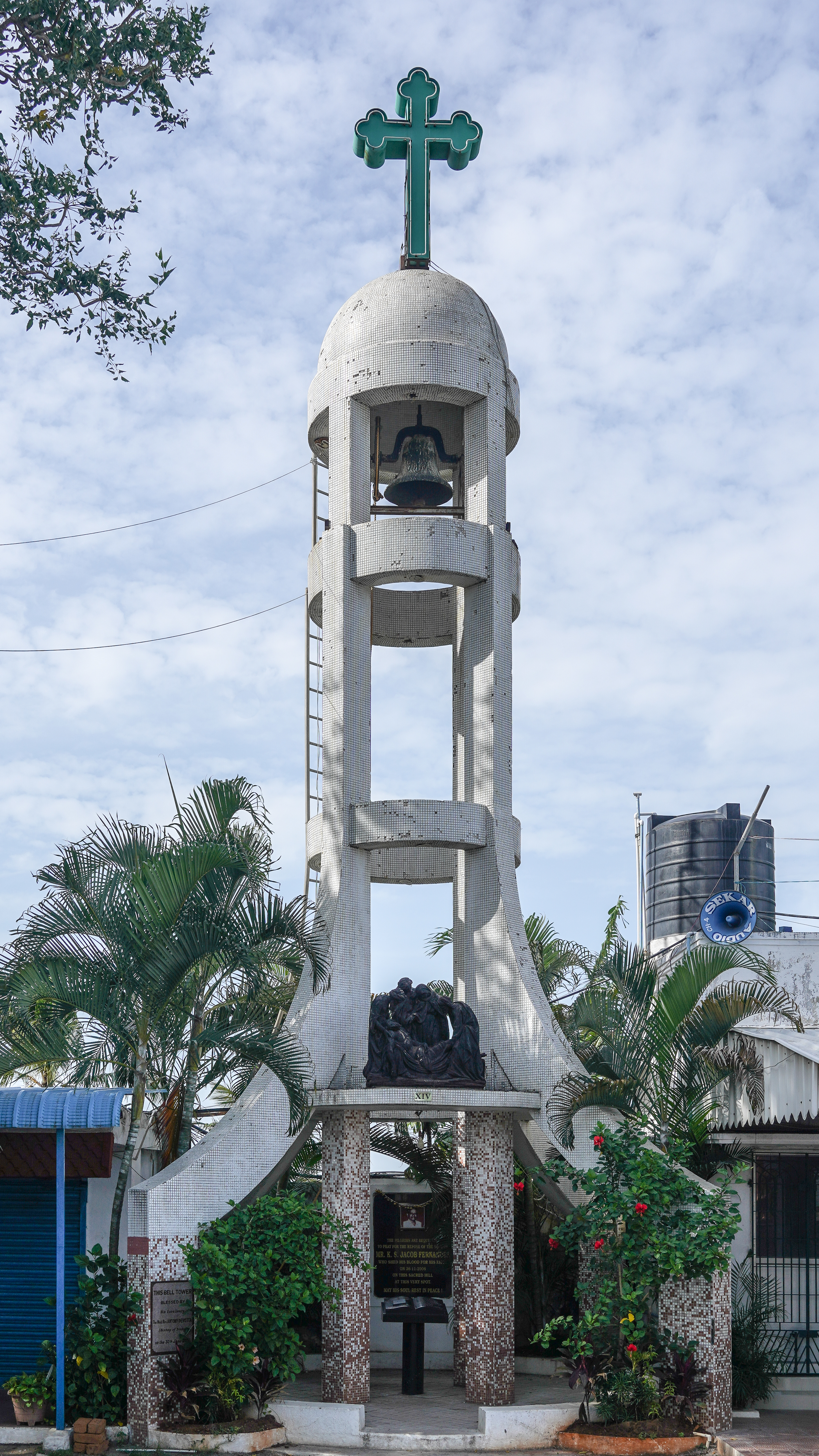
Bell tower

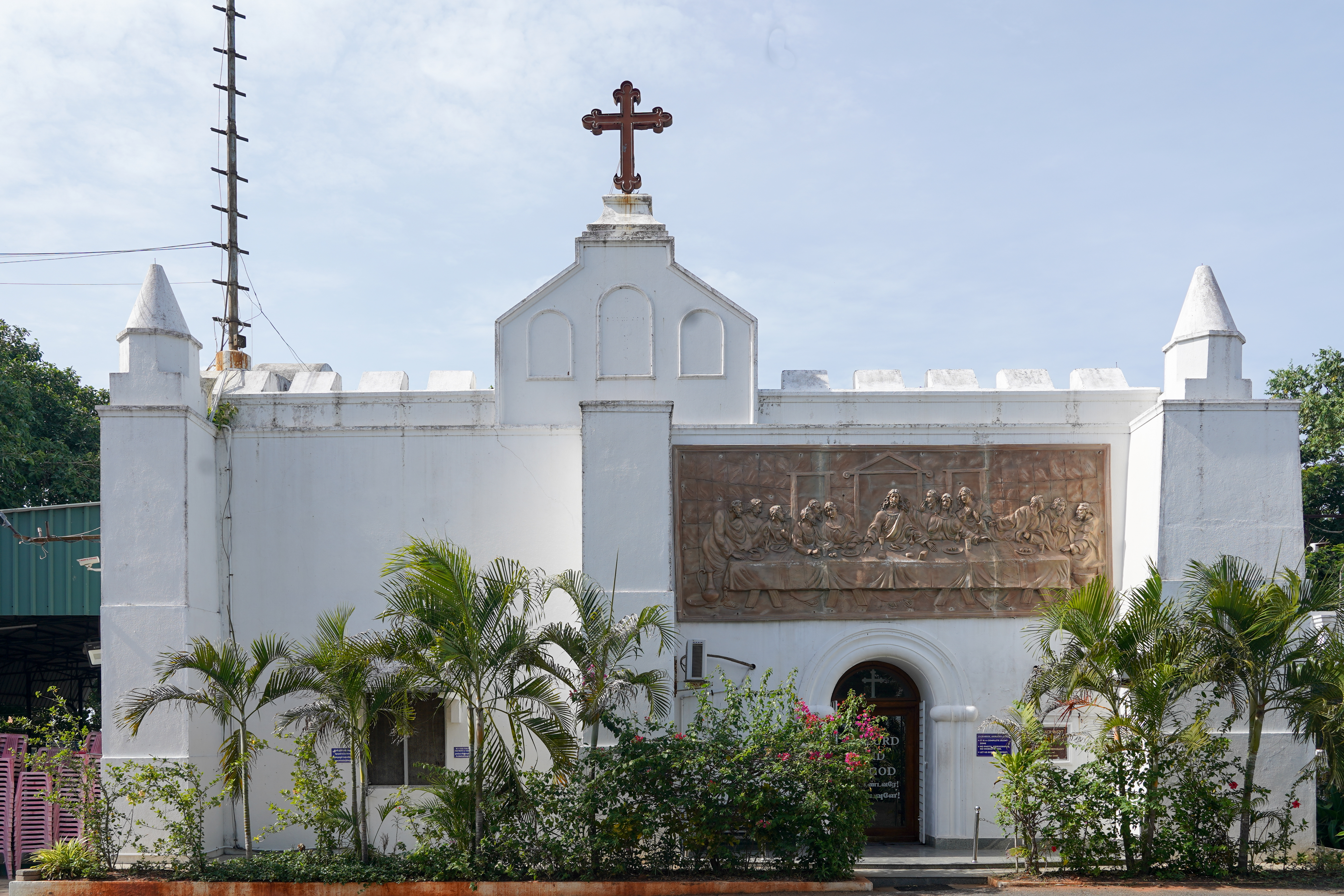
Blessed Sacrament Adoration Chapel

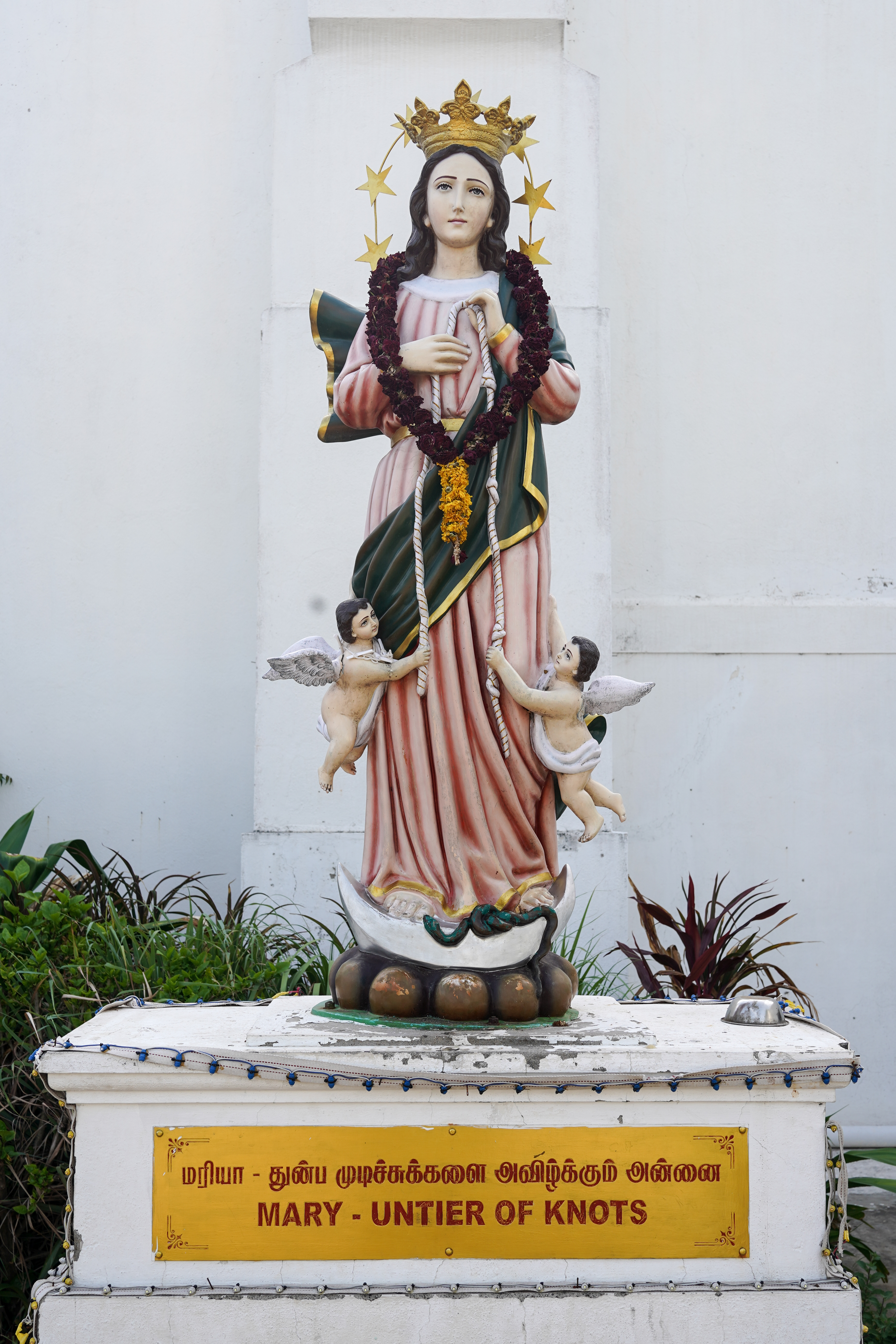
Mary Untier of Knots

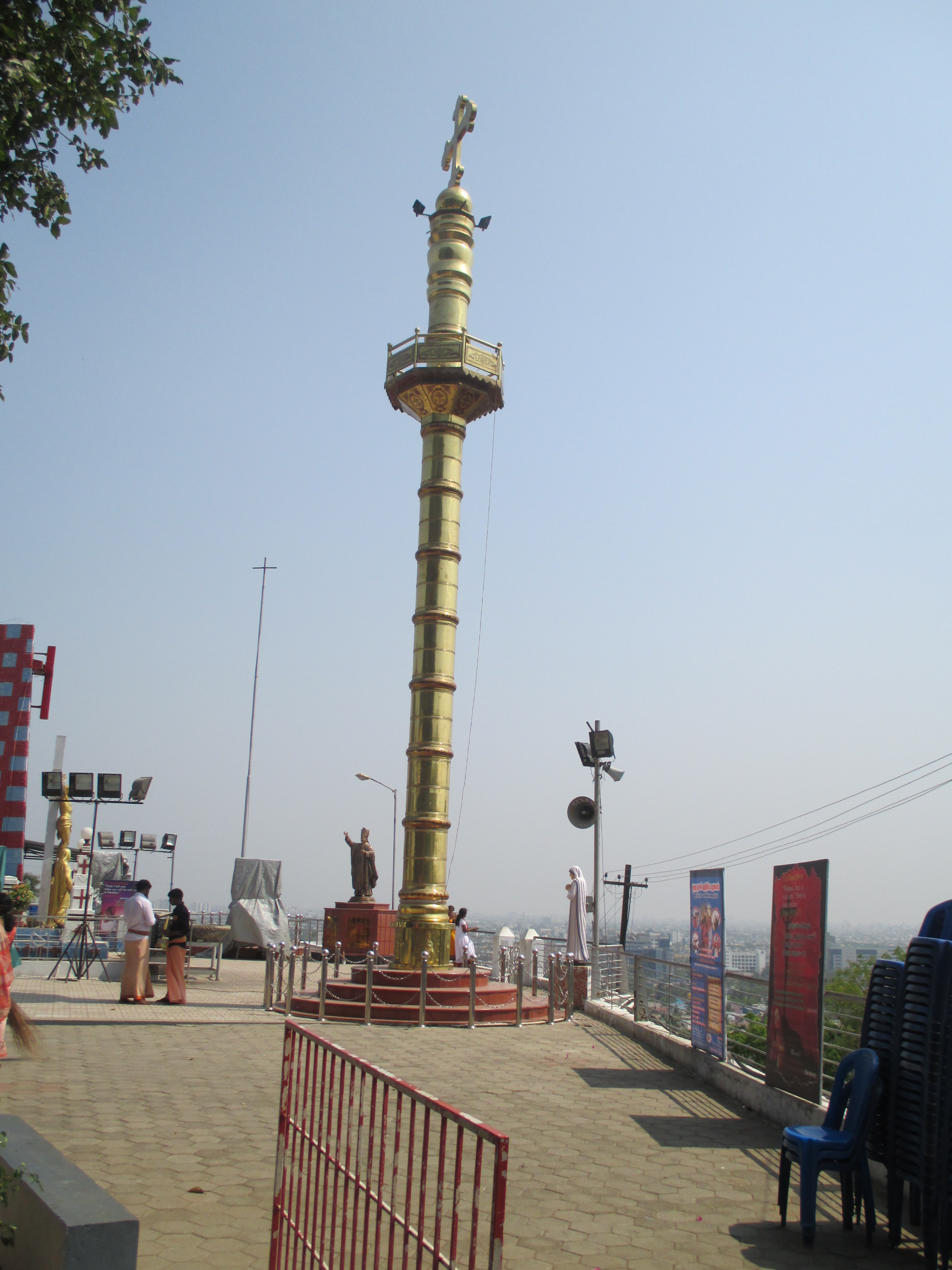
Flagstaff

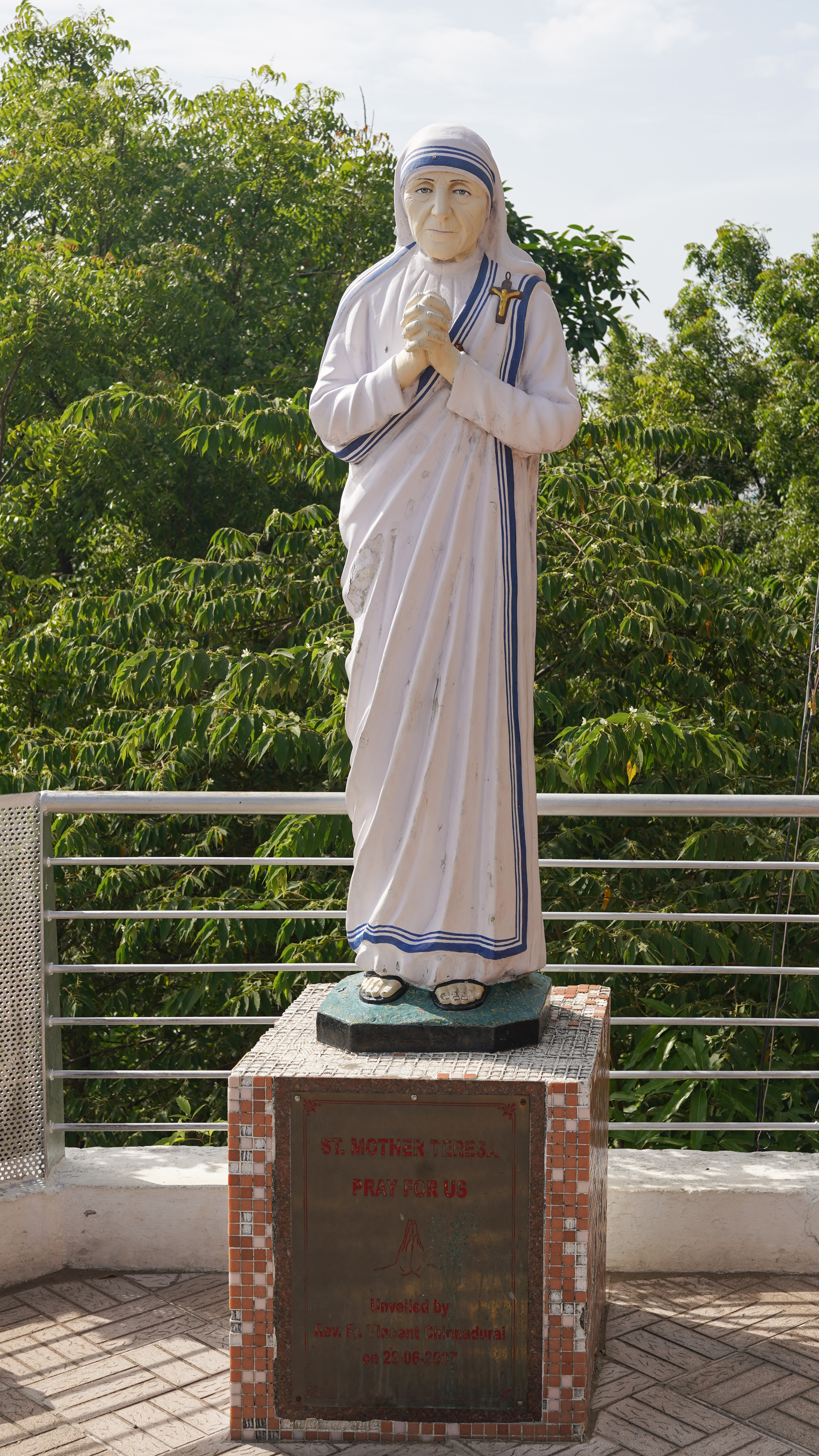
Mother Teresa

=== Interior of the church ===
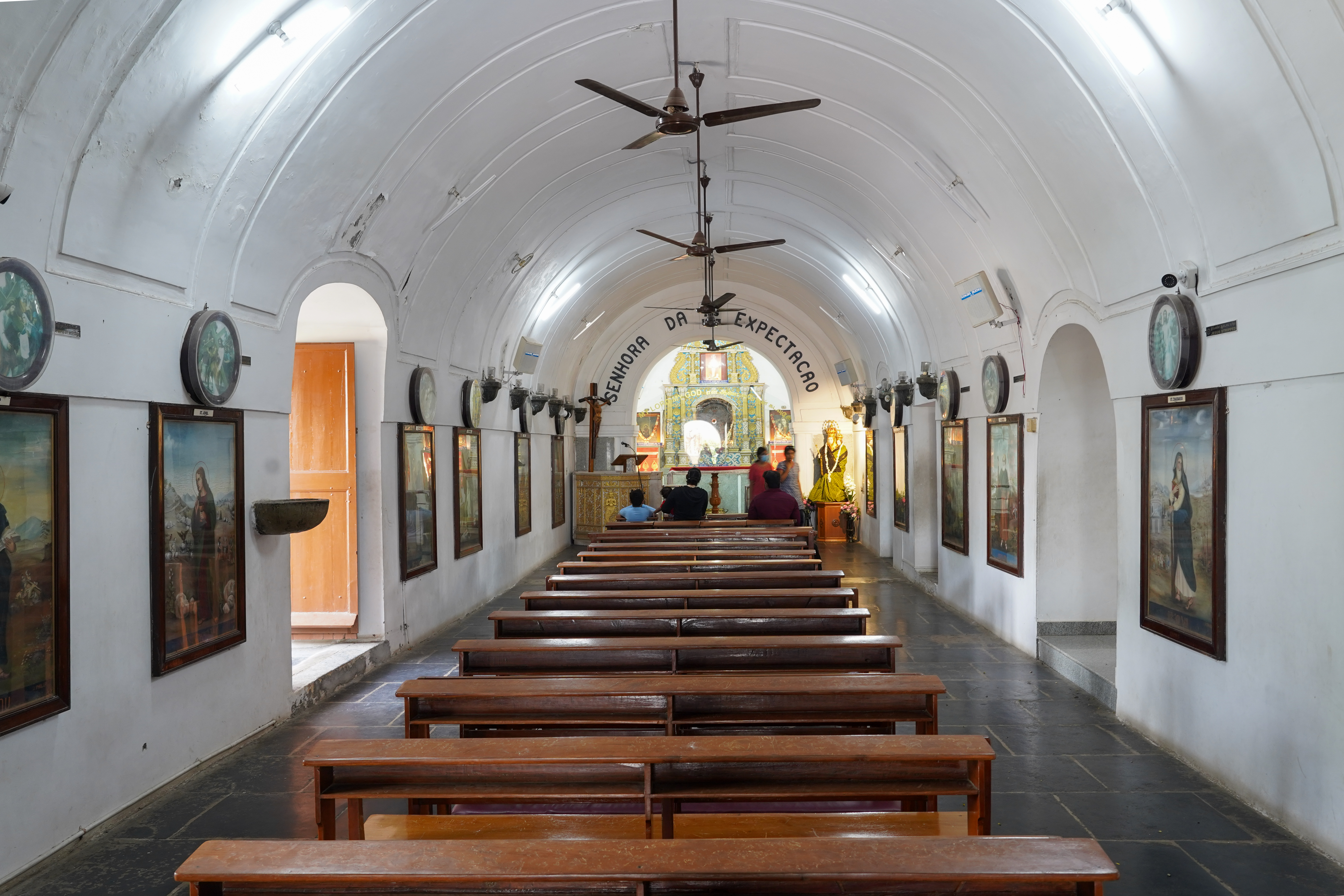
Nave

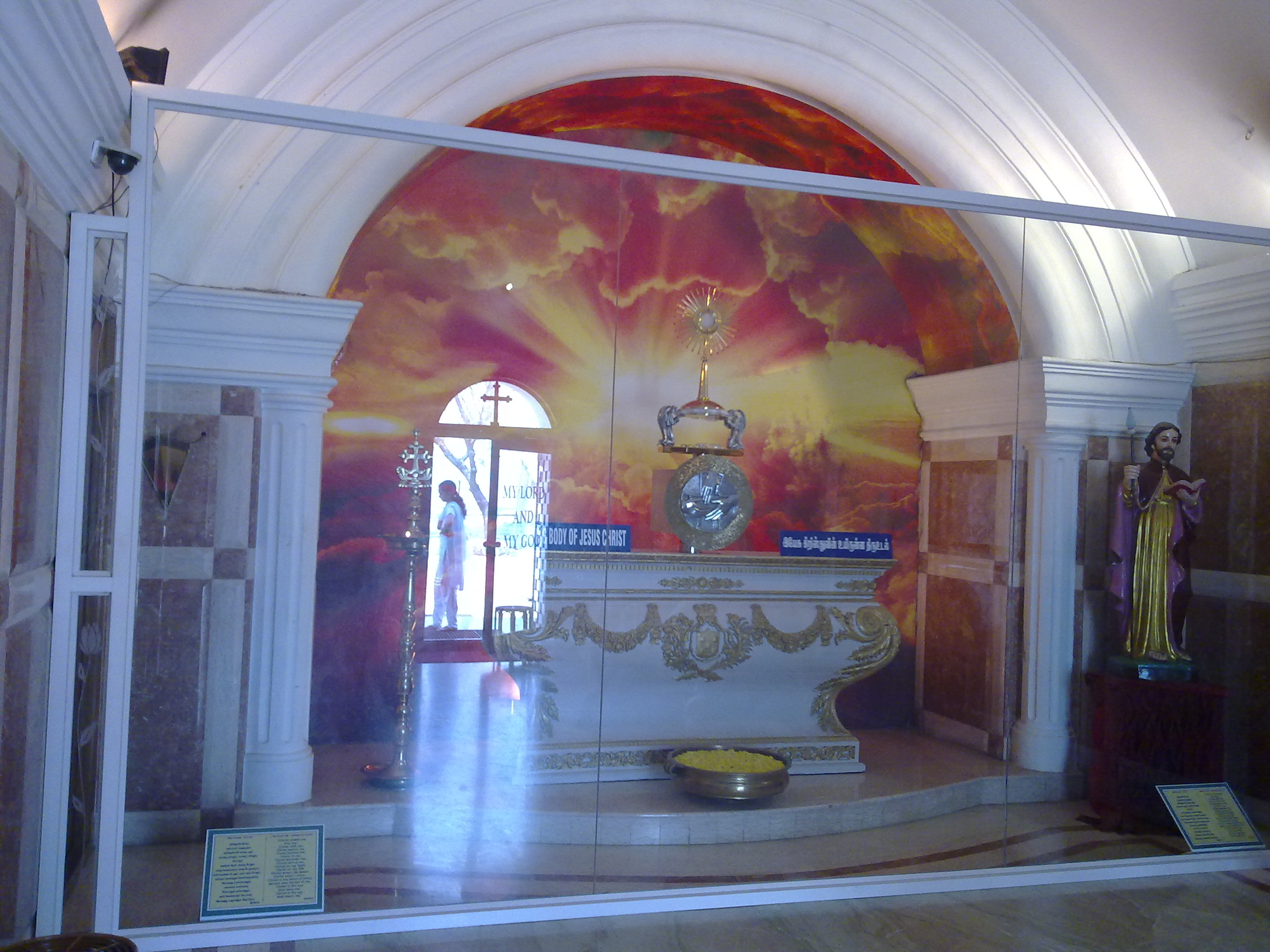
Altar

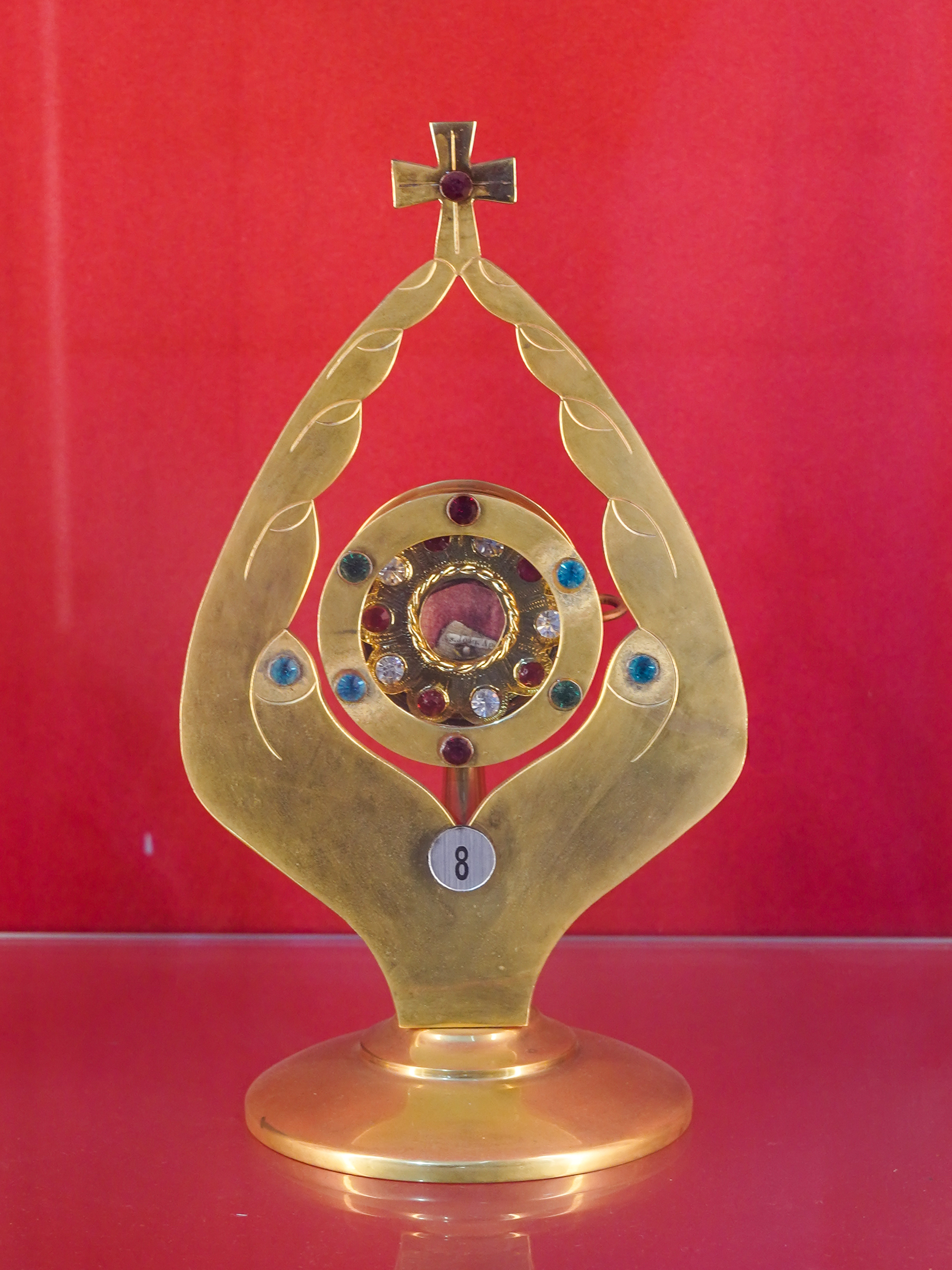
Relic of an apostle

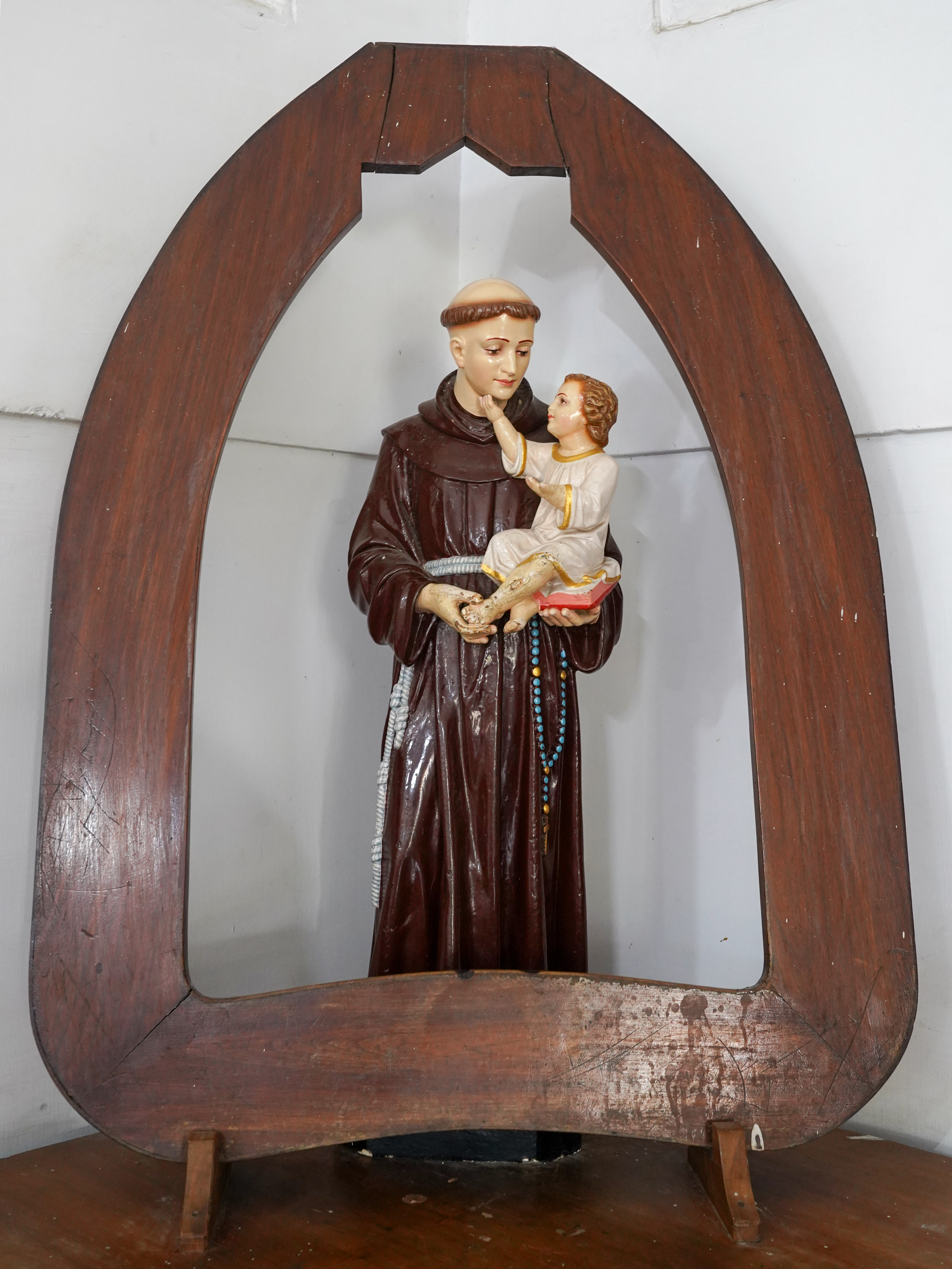
Saint Anthony and infant Jesus

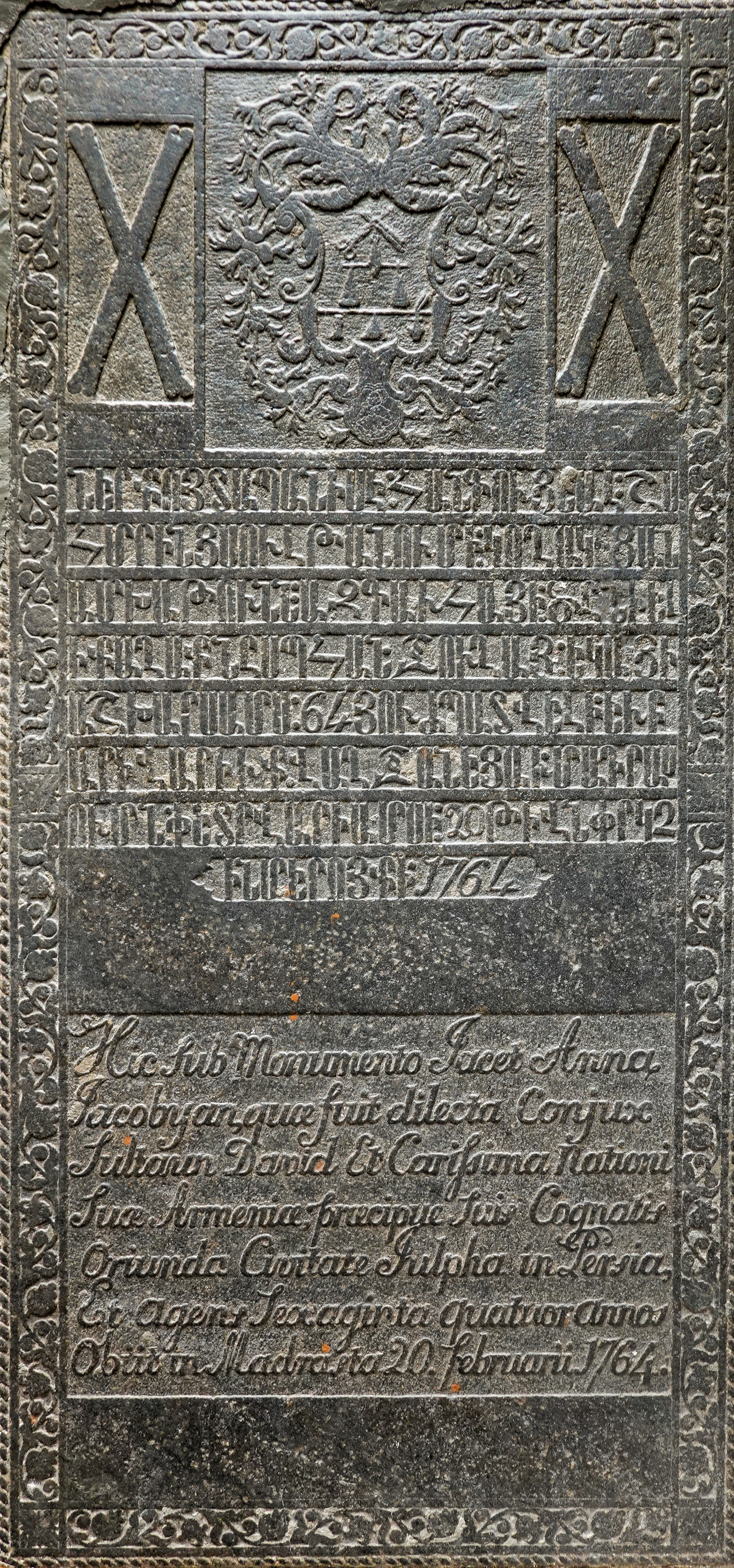
Gravestone in the entrance

=== Stations of the Cross ===
The 14 Stations of the Cross are positioned along the 134-step climb up the Mount.

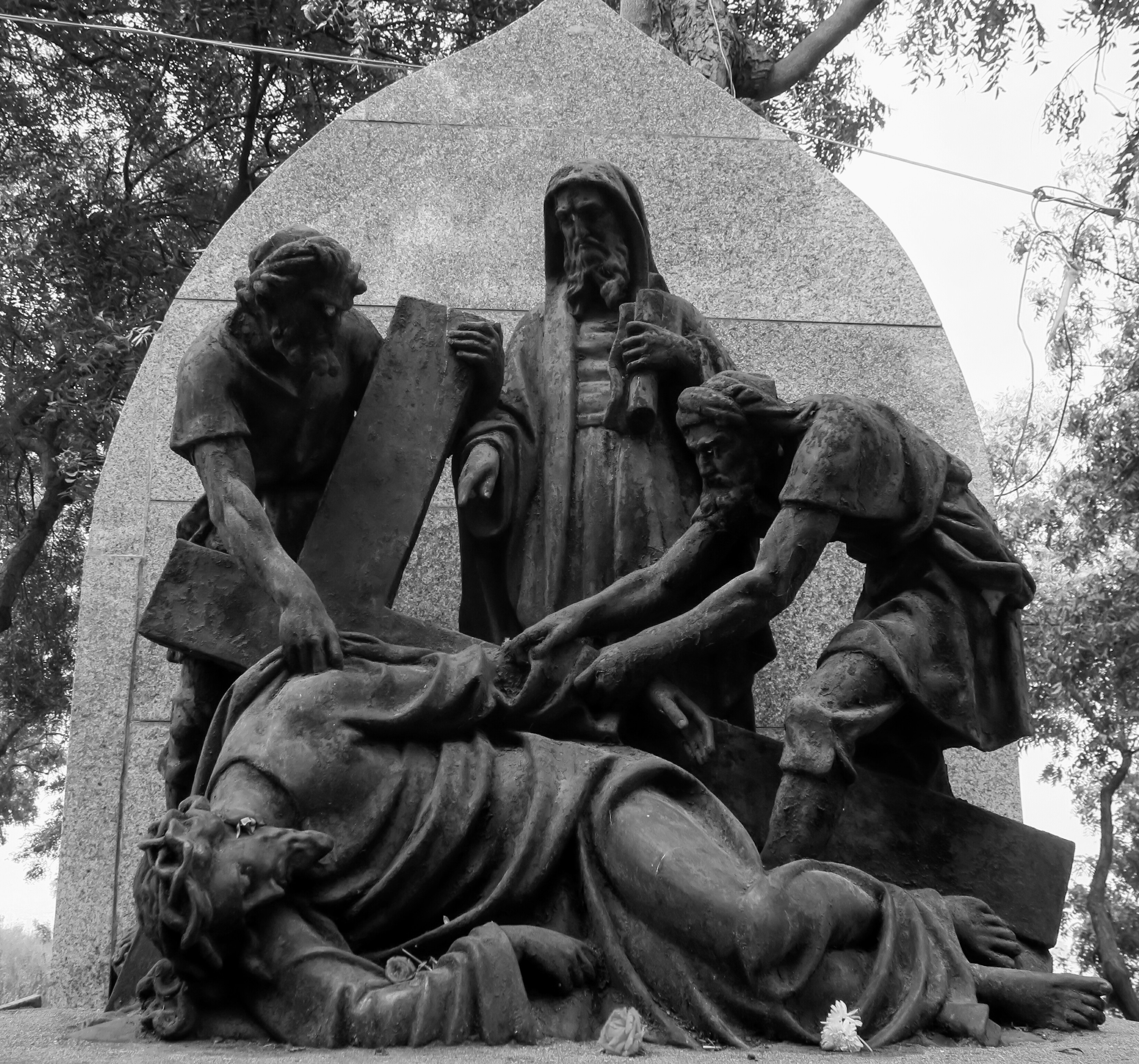
3: Jesus falls for the first time.

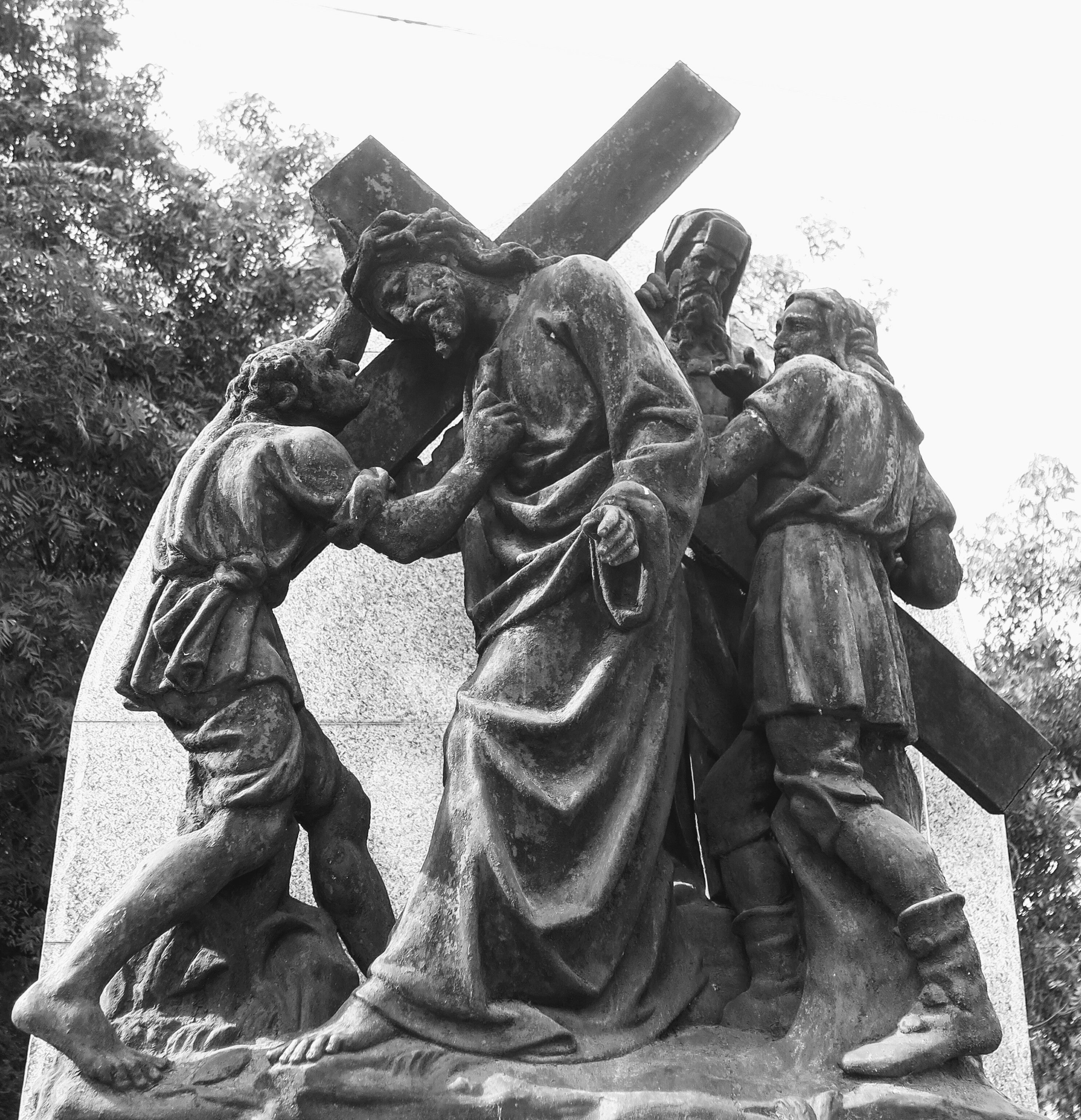
5: Simon helps carry the cross.

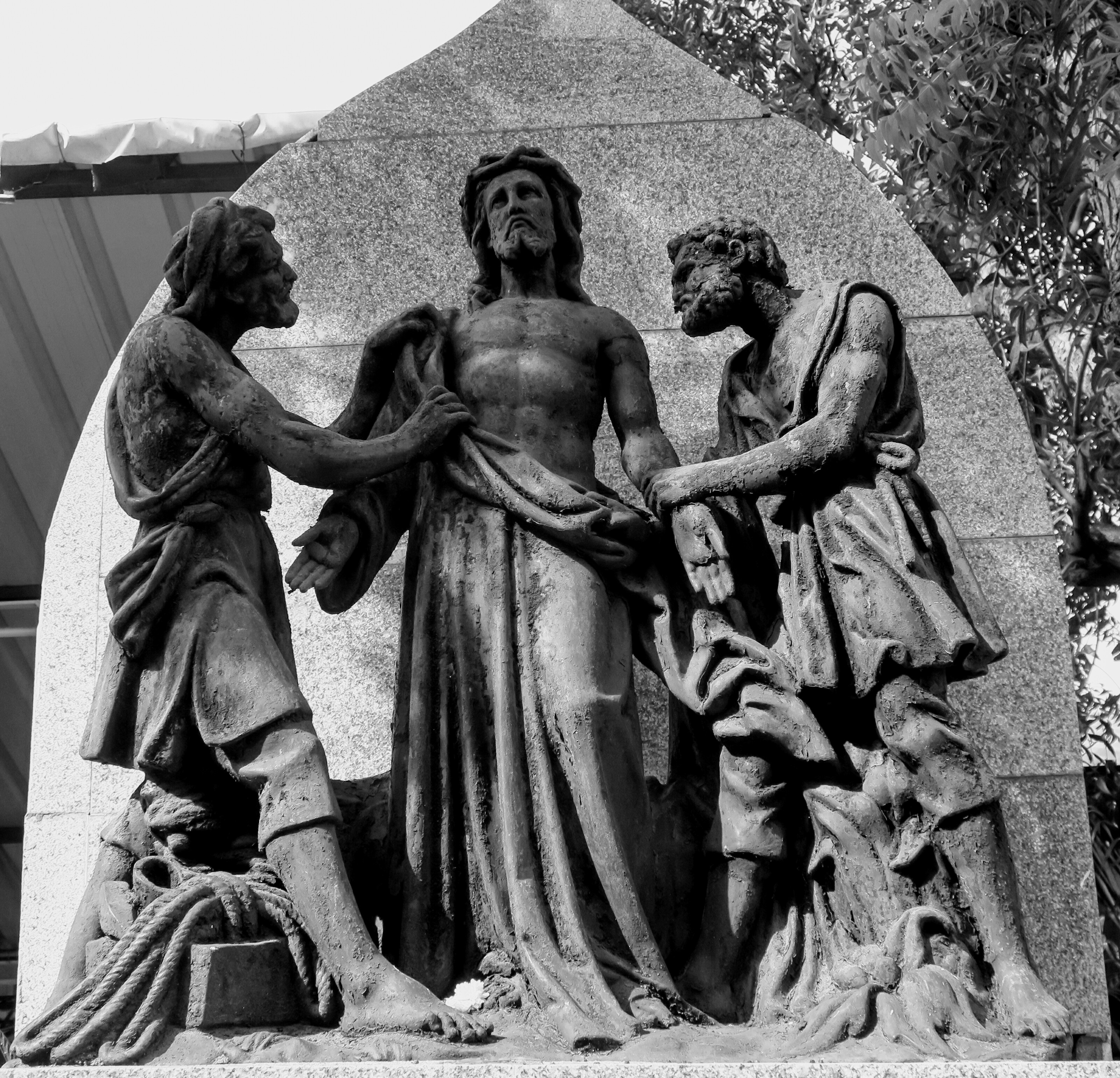
10: Jesus is stripped of his garments.

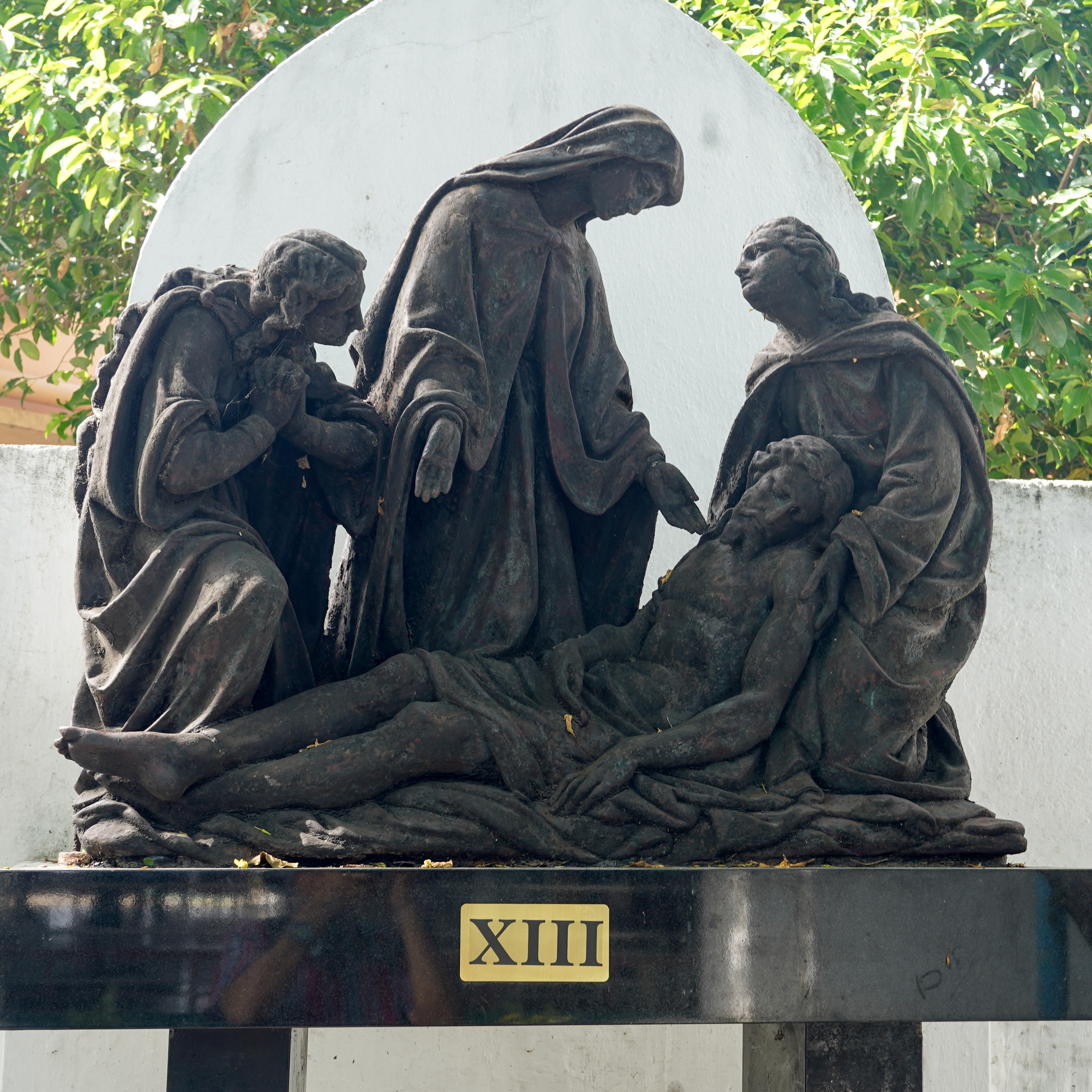
13: Jesus is taken down from the cross.

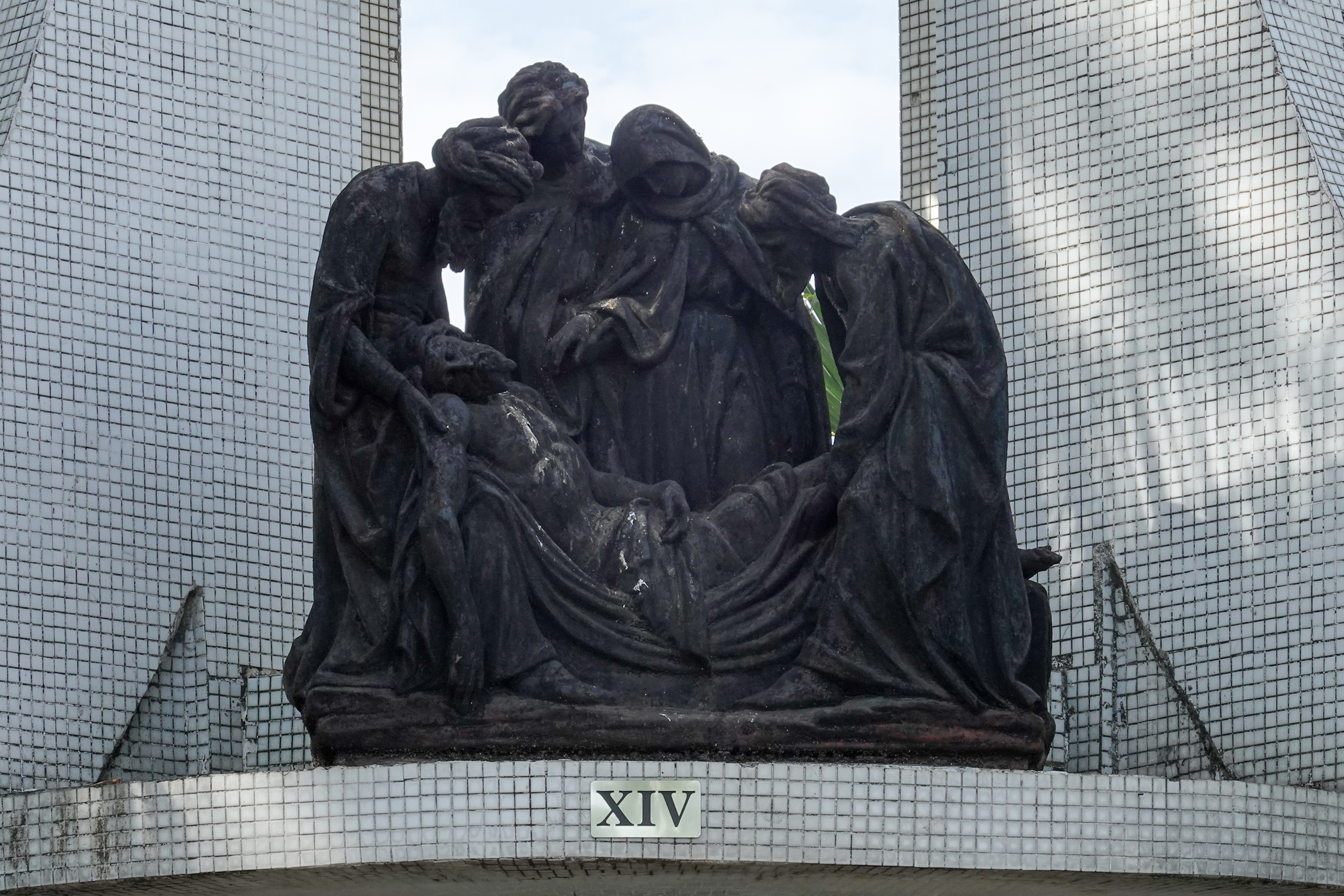
14: Jesus is laid in the tomb.

=== Church of South India churches ===
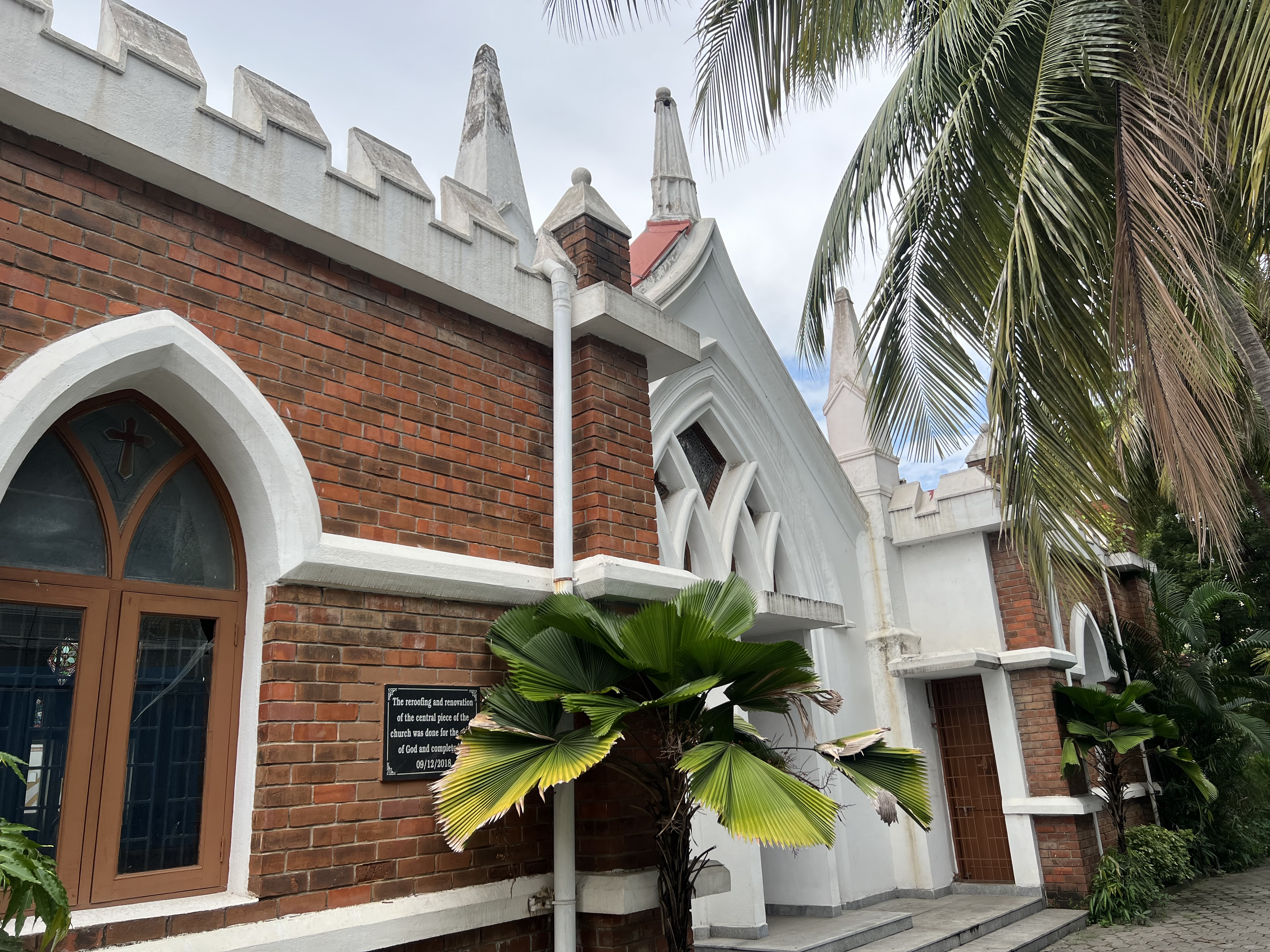
Wesley English Church (1829)

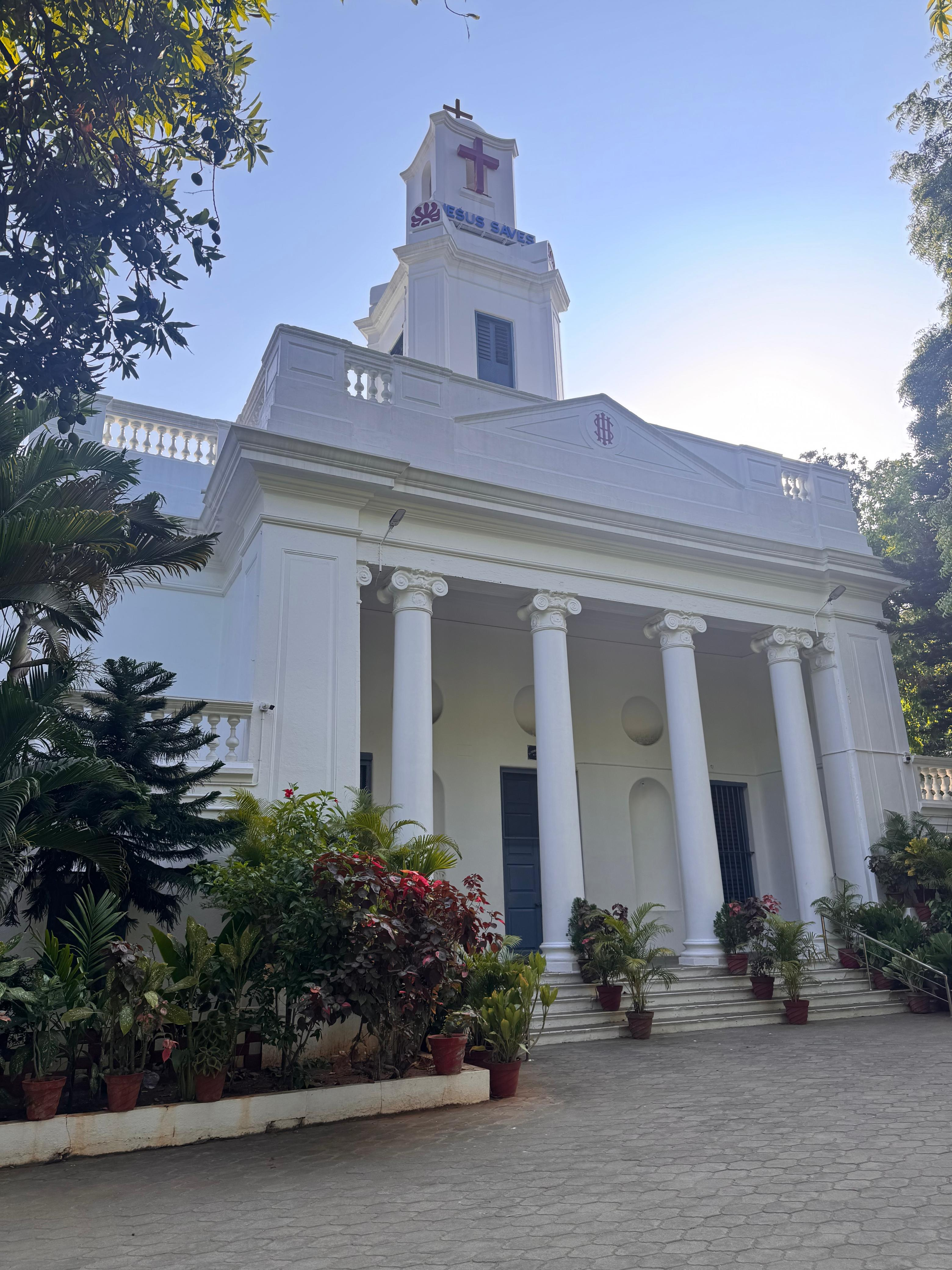
St. Thomas Garrison Church (1830)

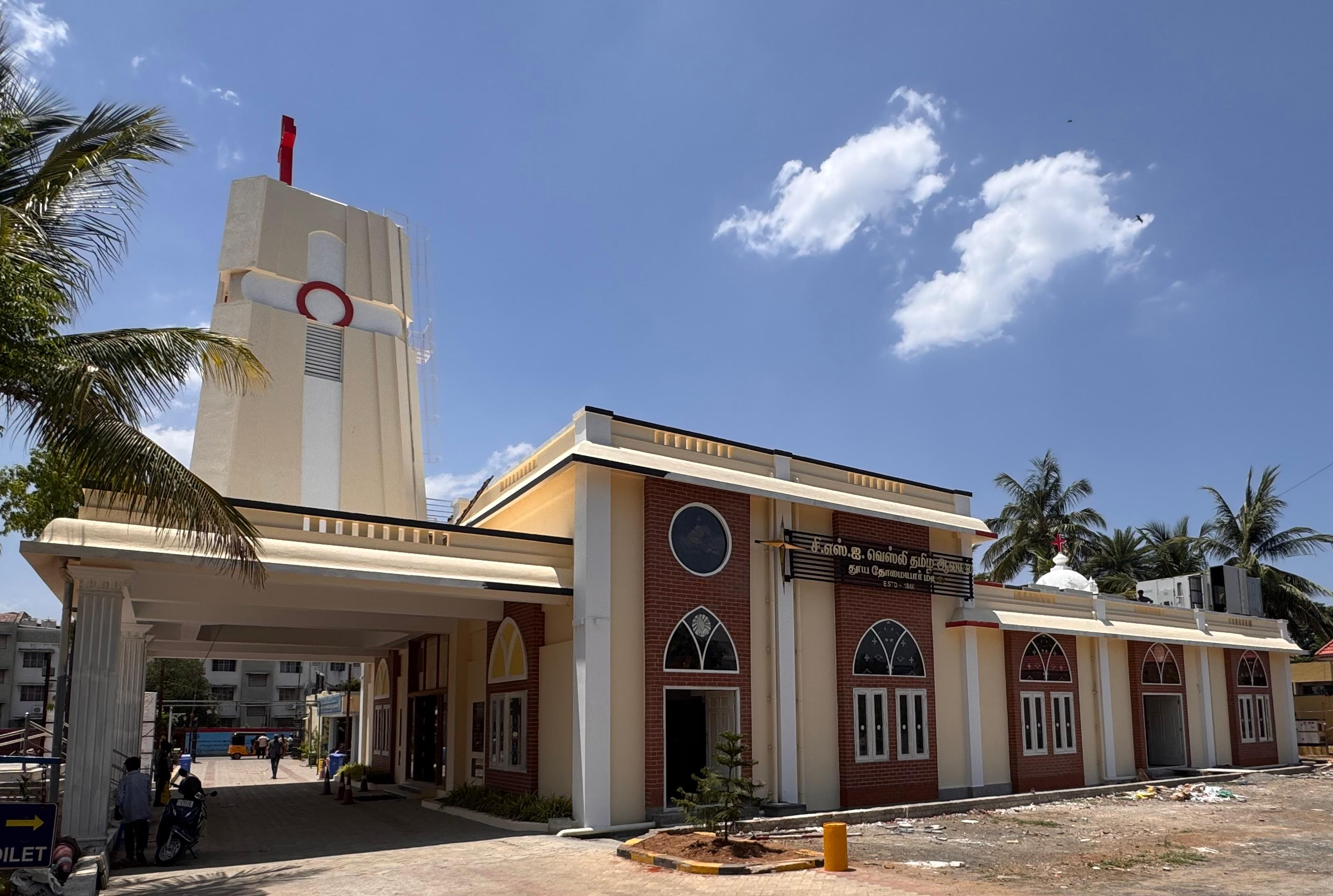
Wesley Tamil Church (1860)

=== Views from the mount ===
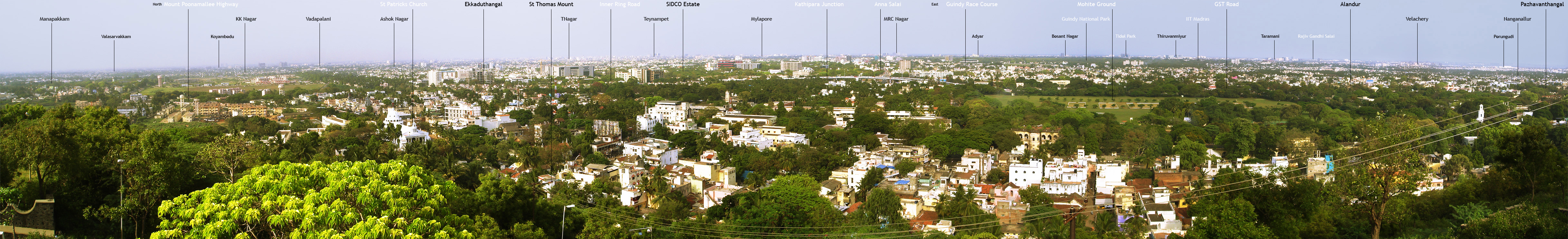
A panoramic view of the city of Chennai as seen from the top of St. Thomas Mount, from northwest clockwise to southeast

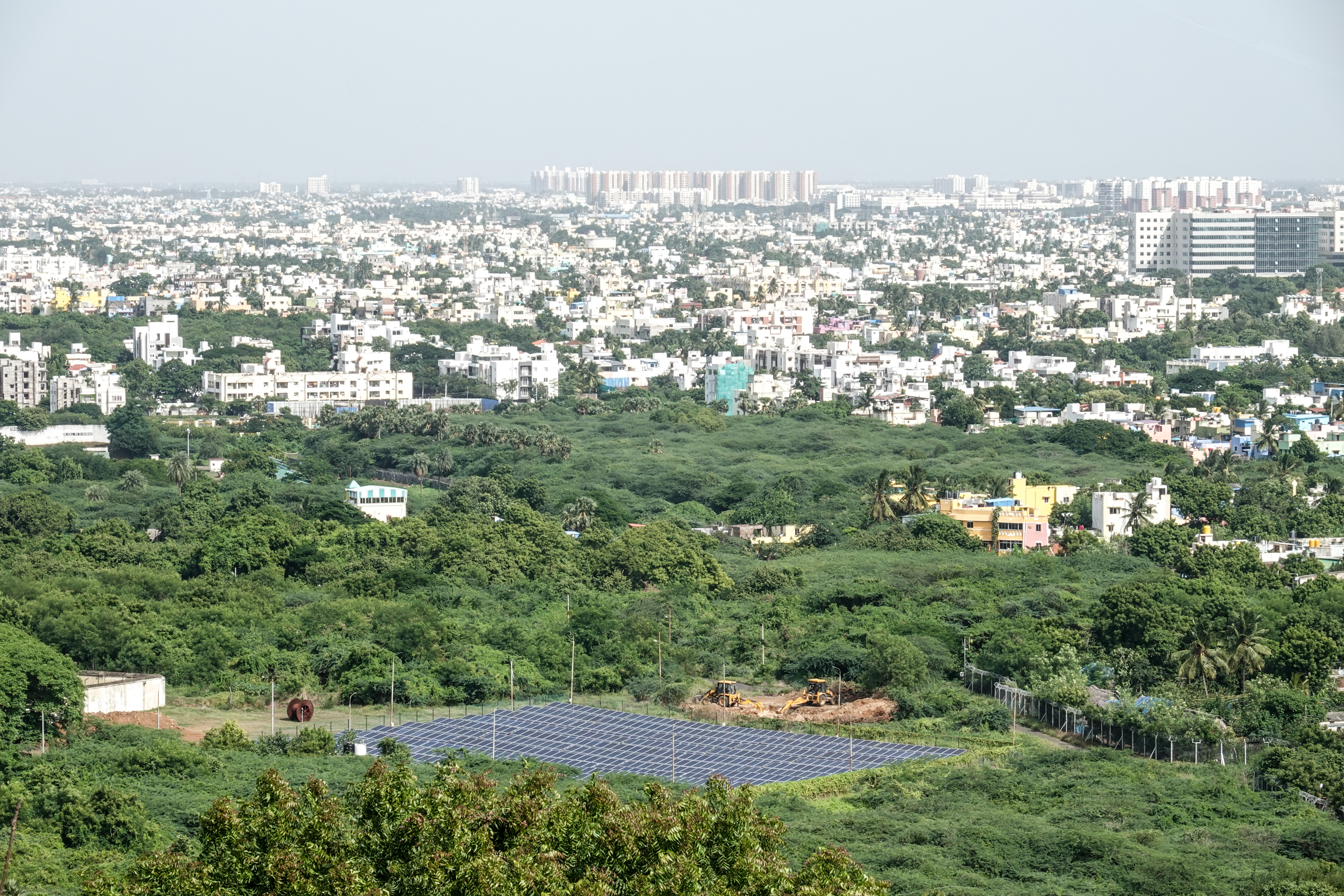
View to north-west

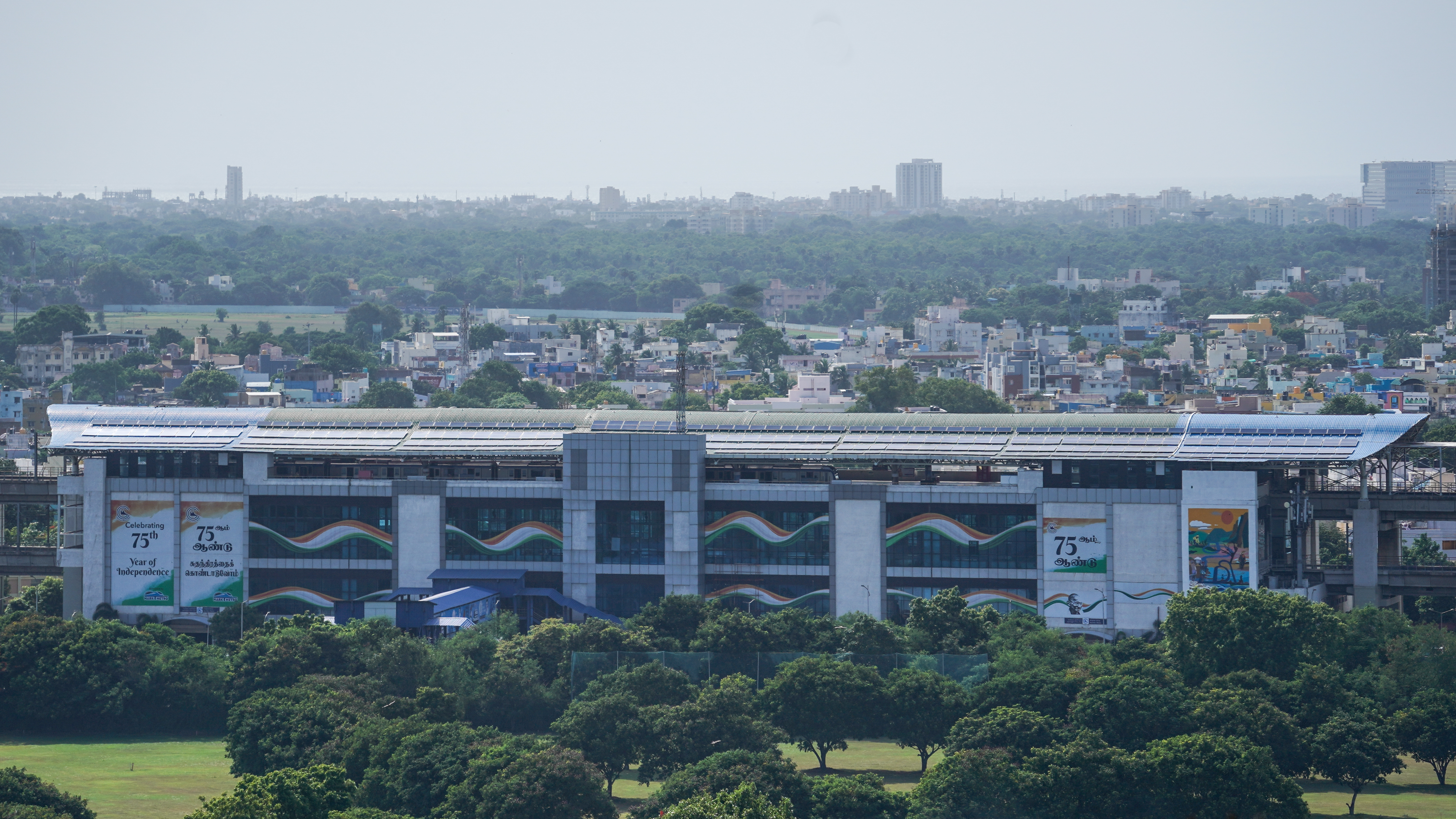
Alandur Metro Station

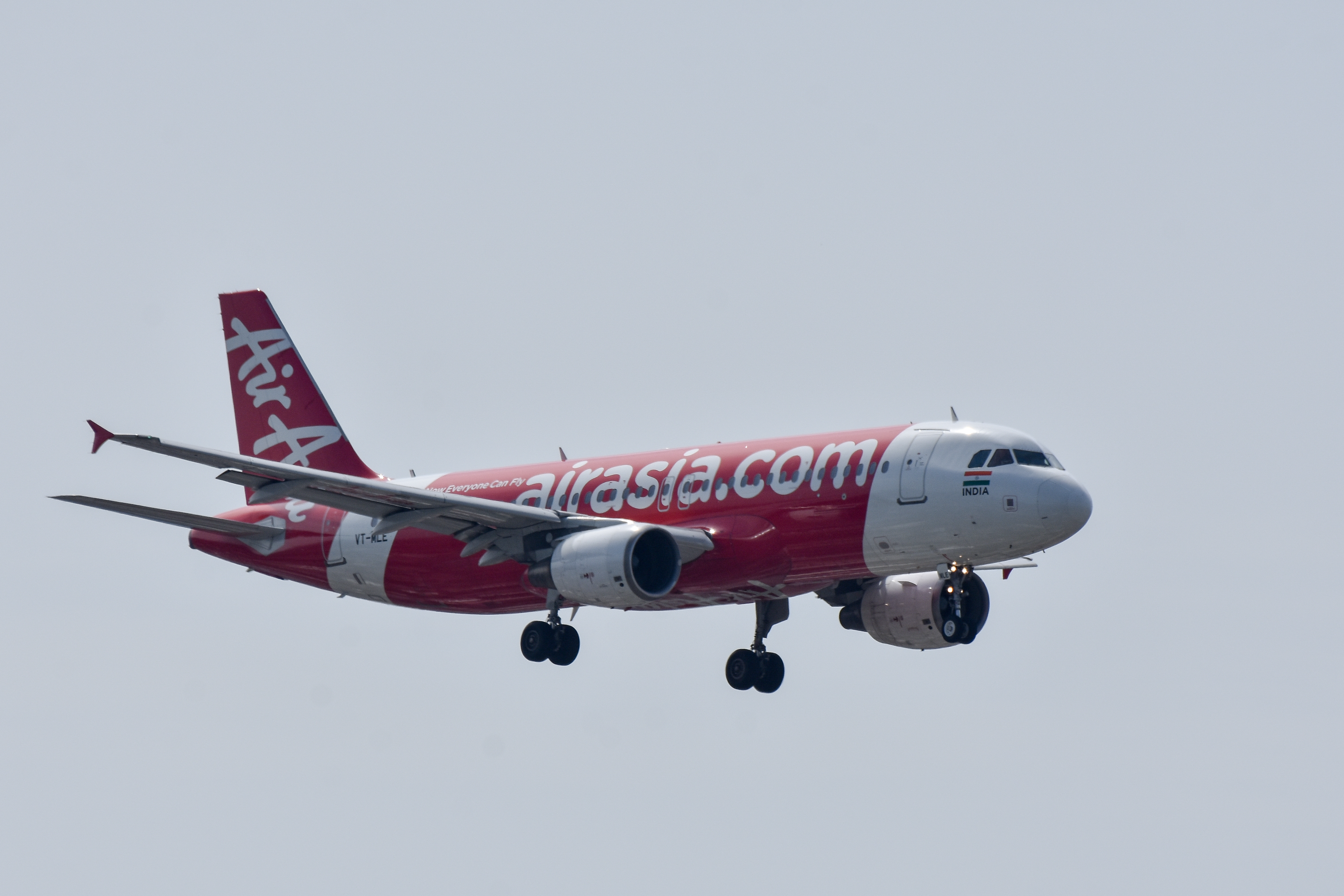
AirAsia A320 final approach

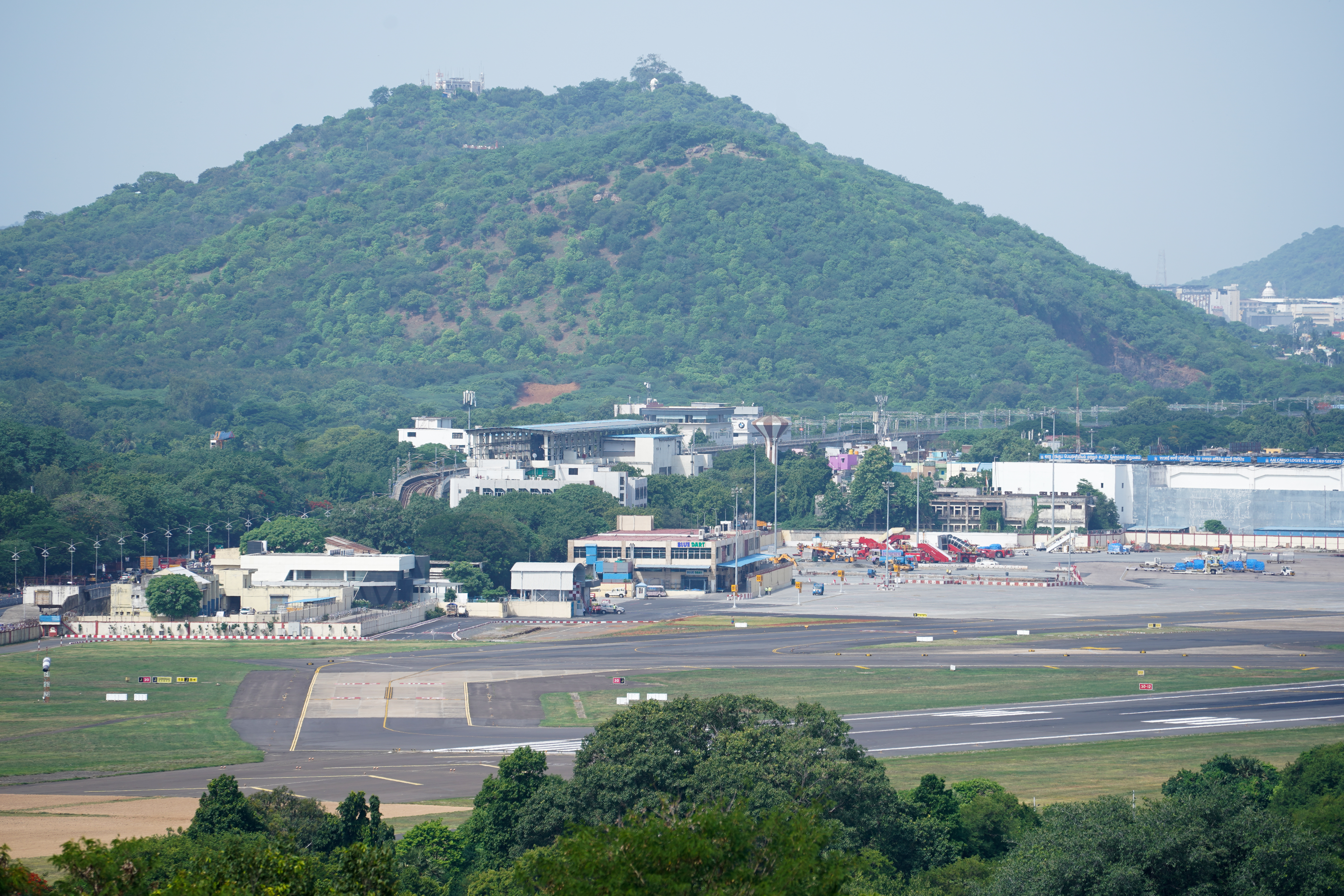
NE runway, Pallavaram Hill

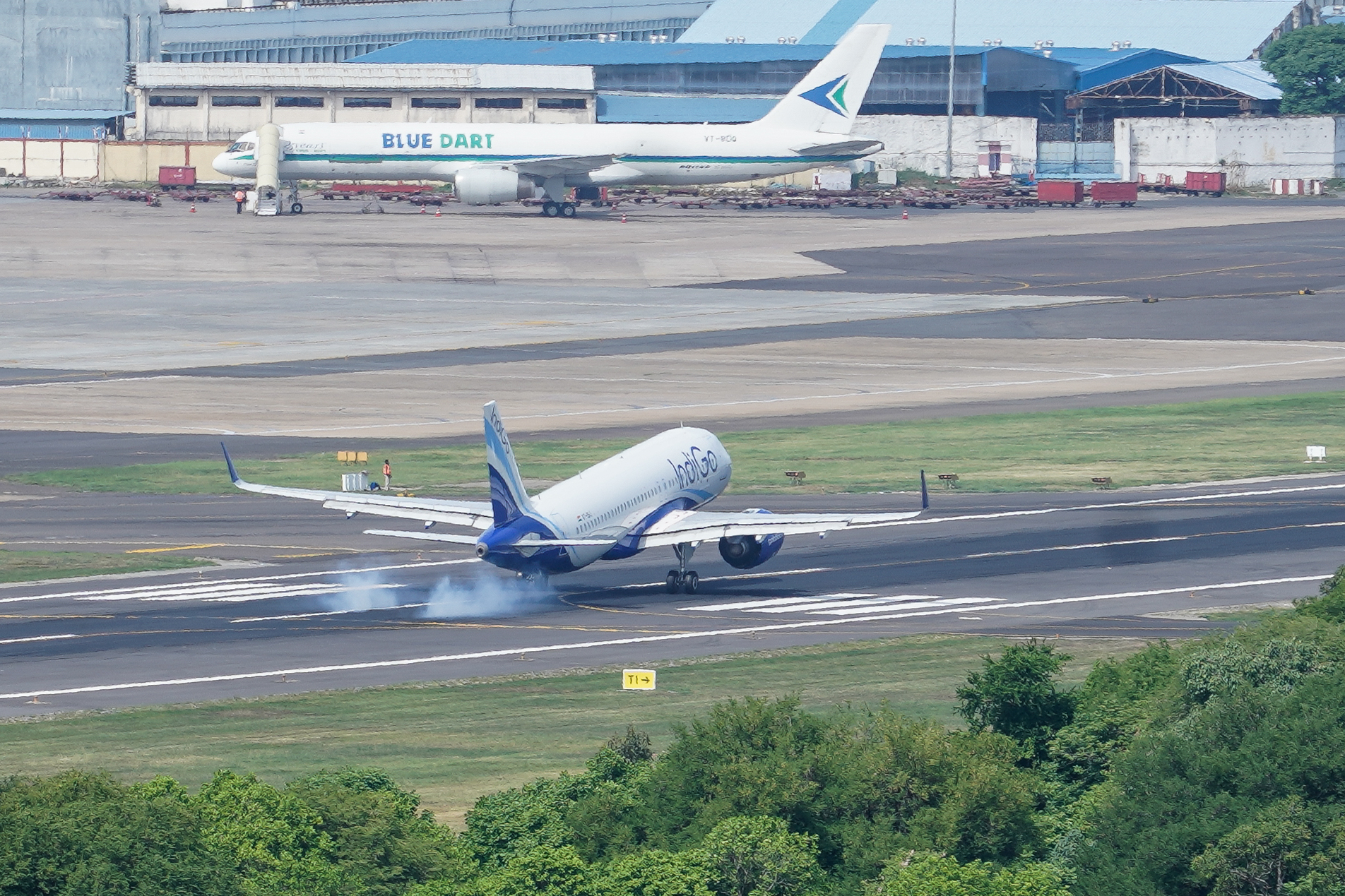
Indigo A320 touch down

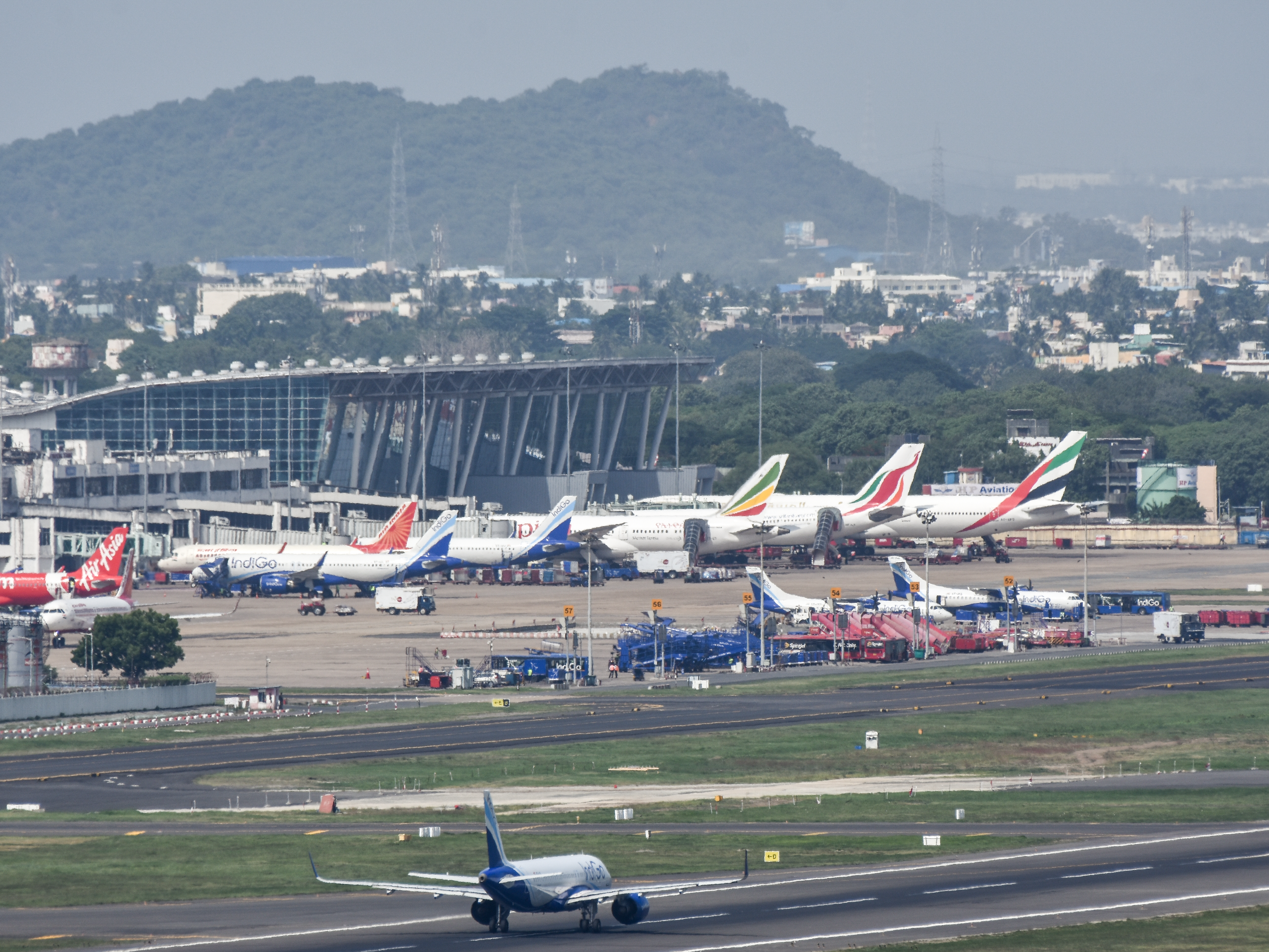
International terminal

== See also ==
- St. Thomas Mount National Shrine Basilica
- Chinnamalai
