= All Saints Garrison Church, Lucknow =

Historical church in Lucknow, India

All Saints Garrison Church
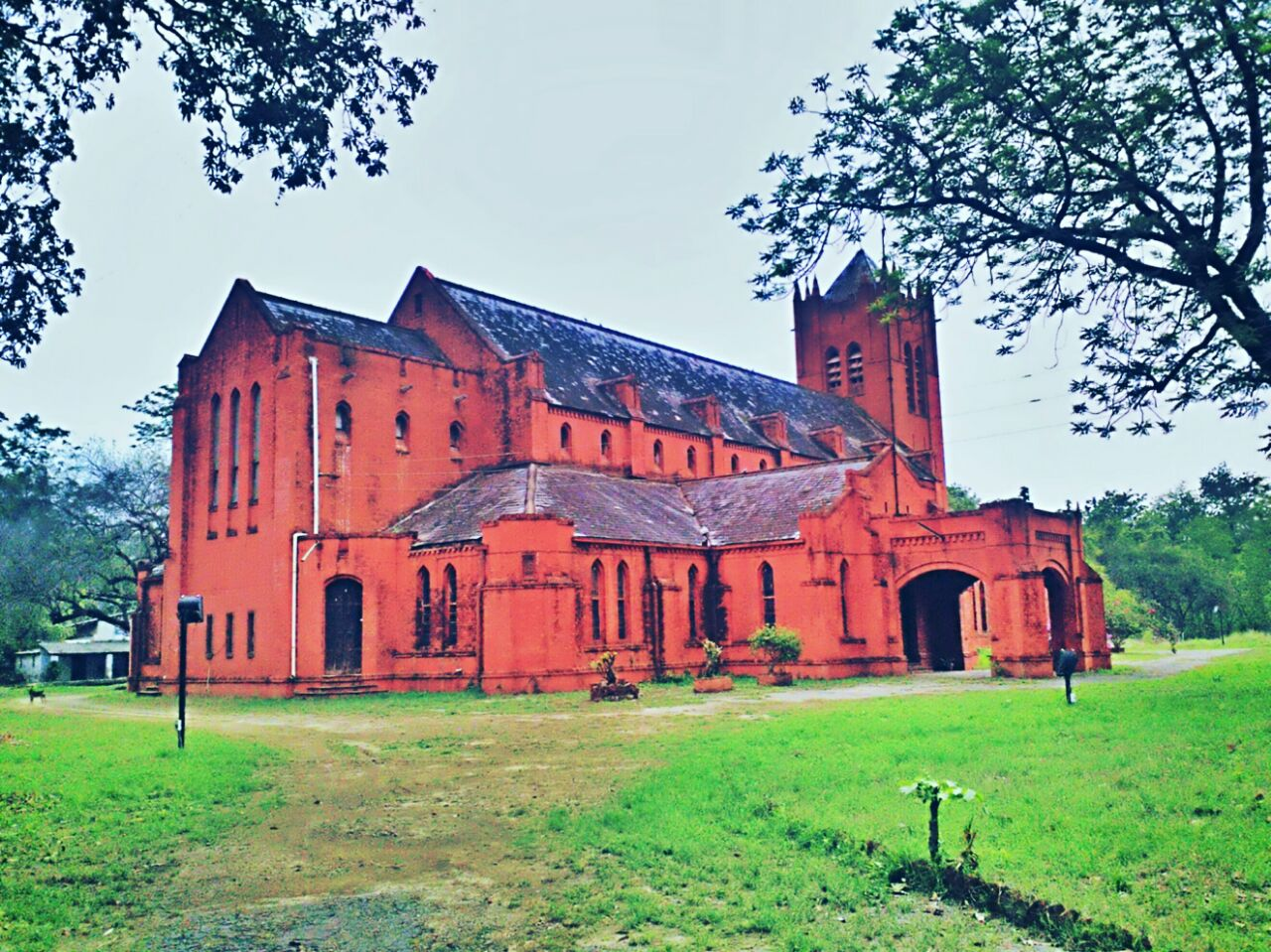
- All Saints Garrison Church, Lucknow.
- All Saints Garrison Church
- 26°48′40″N 80°57′18″E
- Location: Lucknow, Uttar Pradesh, India
- Denomination: Church of North India

History
- Consecrated: 1860

Architecture
- Functional status: active
- Architect: John Baggs
- Architectural type: Church
- Completed: 1860; 166 years ago

Administration
- District: Lucknow

All Saints Garrison Church is a historical building located in the Cantonment area of the city of Lucknow in India.

== History ==
This church was built in 1860 but at that time it was small as compared to its present architecture. With the passage of time, as Lucknow Cantonment began to expand, the number of troops increased and the church was expanded to meet their needs. It was decided in 1908 that a bigger church was extremely necessary. After the new church was reconstructed, it was rechristened as All Saints New Garrison Church.

This was the first church to be built for the Anglican Church. It was designed in 1908 by a British Engineer named Jones Ransom, who has also made the design for the Saint Mungo's Church of Scotland in Lucknow Cantonment. When he returned to England, the work was completed by Lishman under the supervision of architect John Baggs.

== Architecture ==
The total cost incurred in the construction of this church was Rs. 91,000. The imposing architecture of this church is inspired by Magdalen College, Oxford. Above the main door of the church, situated in the west, is a tall tower which houses the church bell.

The main design of the church was prepared by Ransom, but after he moved to England, the subsequent engineers made a few changes to the design. The tower was constructed a little shorter than it was originally intended and the side walls were also reduced in thickness and height, so that some savings could be done. The quadrangle of the church is also quite large and has seating areas made out of ply. The prominent feature of these seats is that every bench has a niche for keeping guns on the upper-back side.
