= St. Thomas Garrison Church =

- St. Thomas English Garrison Church
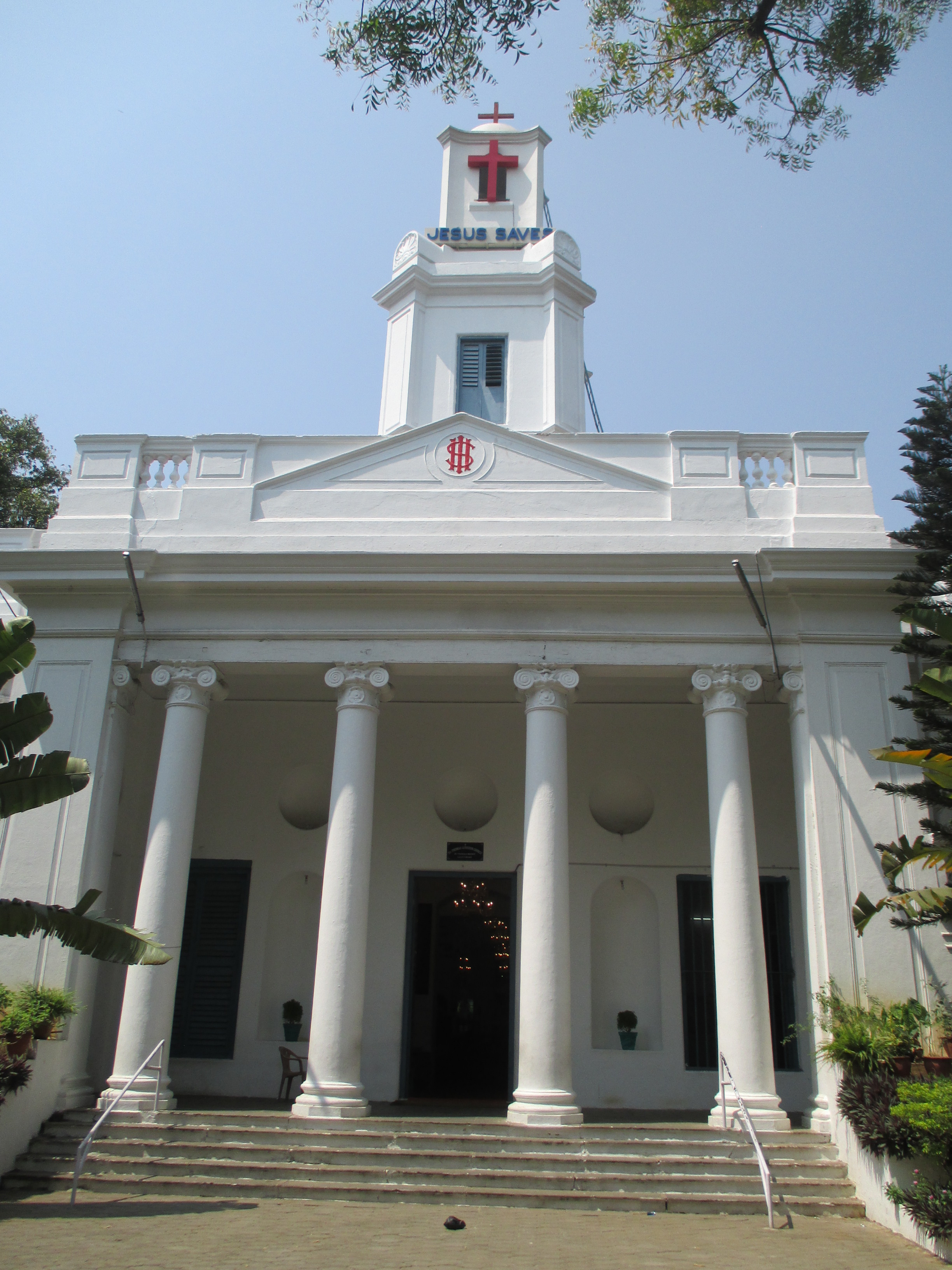
- Front view of the church

- Location within Tamil Nadu
- 13°00′08″N 80°11′48″E
- Location: St. Thomas Mount, Chennai
- Country: India
- Denomination: Church of South India

History
- Dedication: 1830

Architecture
- Functional status: Active
- Architectural type: Chapel
- Style: Gothic architecture

Administration
- Archdiocese: Diocese of Madras of the Church of South India

St. Thomas Garrison Church (also called St. Thomas English Garrison Church) is one of the oldest churches in the St. Thomas Mount area of Chennai, the capital of the South Indian state of Tamil Nadu. The Church was built by the British government at the request of the army officers in the area in 1830. The church was constructed with bomb-proof roof and rust-proof iron railings, and most of the materials for the construction were imported from Britain. It is located in the foothills of St. Thomas Mount and named after St. Thomas, one of the twelve apostles who resided at the place during his final years.

St. Thomas English Garrison Church is a working church with hourly prayer and daily services and follows the Protestant Christian tradition. In modern times, it is under the dominion of Diocese of Madras of the Church of South India. The Church is declared as a heritage monument under the Chennai Circle of the Archaeological Survey of India.

== Architecture ==
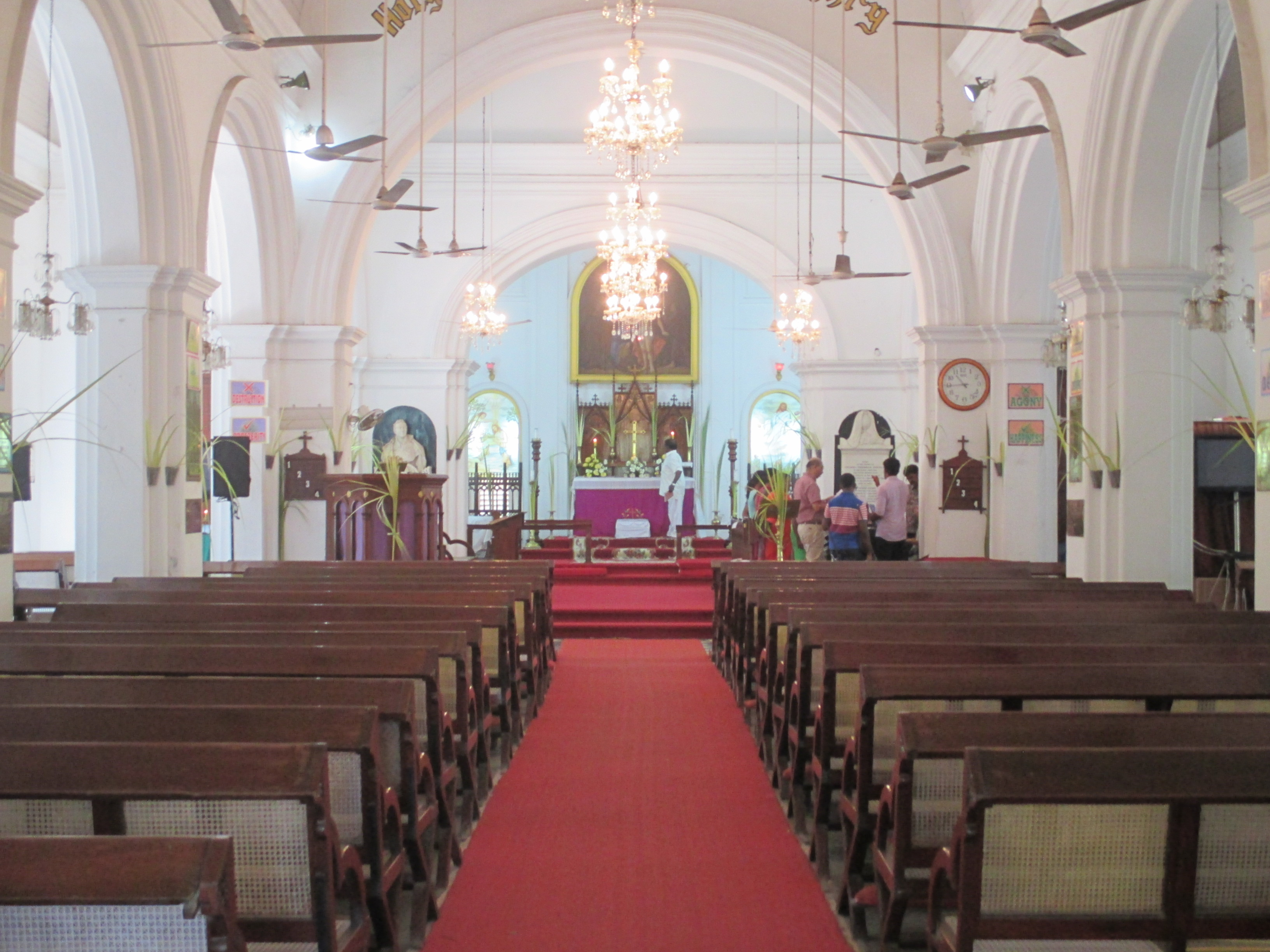
Sanctum of the shrine

The church is considered an exact replica of St Clement Danes at London. St. Thomas Garrison Church was modelled on contemporary churches like St. George's Cathedral, Chennai. It is located in the foothills of St. Thomas Mount and is named after St. Thomas, one of the Twelve apostles who resided at the place during his final years. It is 133 ft (41 m) long and 66 ft (20 m) wide. The compound was built with bricks, mortar and limestone. It is believed that the railings are made out of iron from the discarded weapons of Tipu Sultan. The Church was originally the starting point to Southern districts, located in 1, Grand South Trunk Road from Chennai. The building had a bomb-proof roof, rust-proof iron railings and cast iron chairs imported from England. The altar houses conventional Methodist images and a prayer hall for the worshippers. Paintings of Jesus Christ and other apostles are housed on the walls facing the worshippers. The room behind the sanctuary has a wooden staircase leading to the top of the tower. The original temple bell cast in England was heavy and developed cracks. It was replaced by a smaller bell from Rangoon donated by a church member. There are twenty windows, five doors, Roman ionic pillars, a false ceiling made of teak wood, imported chairs, Bible and a pipe organ. The British Army and administrative officers residing in the Garrison and regions around it made generous contributions to the church. The monument of Major-General William Sydenham is found in the precincts of the Church. The Church originally had a multi level tall spire, which was trimmed to accommodate passing flights from the nearby airport.

== History ==
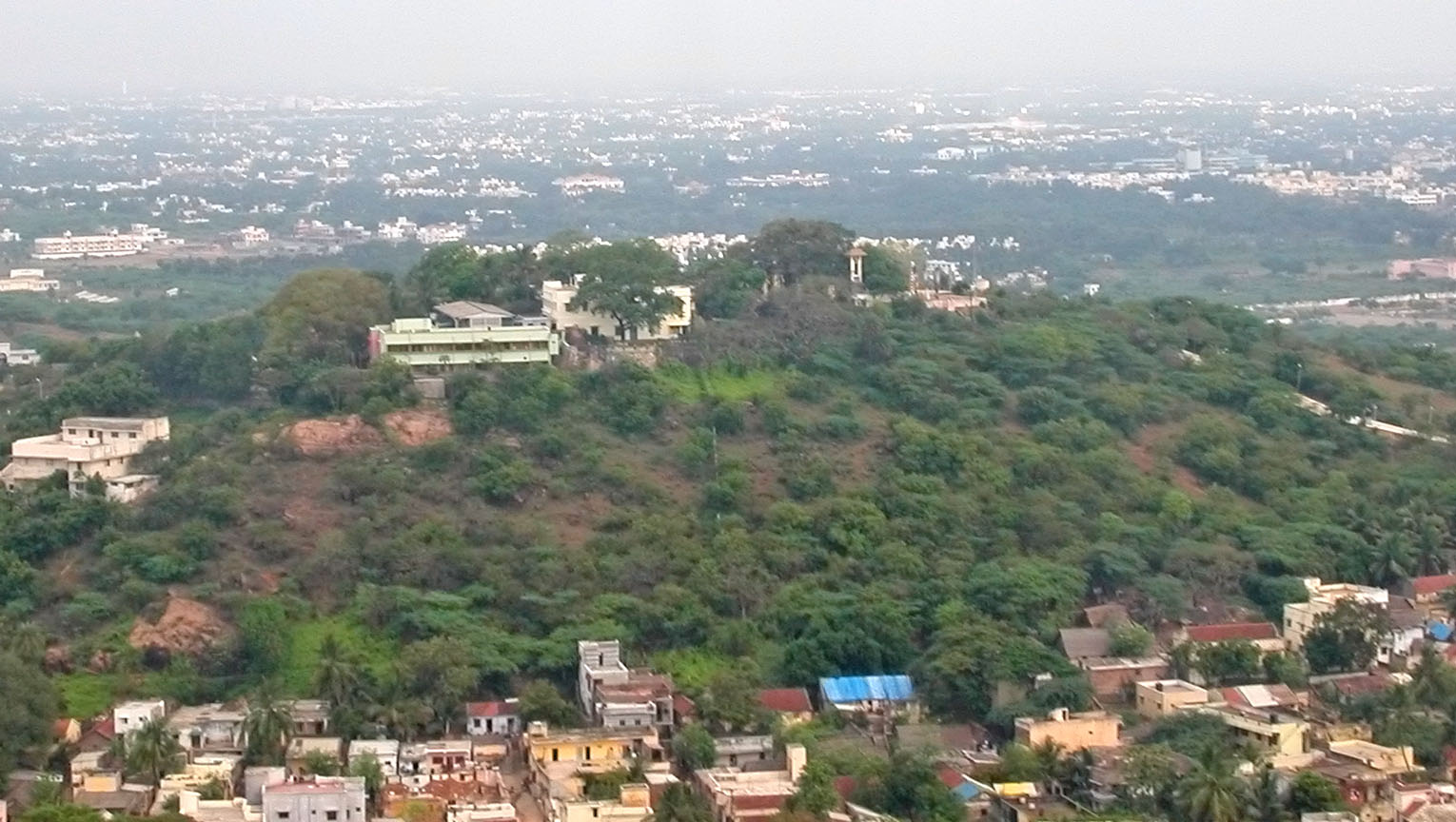
St. Thomas Mount, the donwhill where the Church is located

The British troops were housed in various places in Pallavaram and St. Thomas Mount. There was agitation by the soldiers to build a church for their worship. The government asked the Military Board to provide an estimate and allowed it to rent a building temporarily for the worship. Rev. Atwood, who was frontrunning the proposal, submitted a proposal for 3,000 pounds sterling. The proposal was rejected citing cost. After Atwood, who died in 1810, his successor Rev. Bell suggested expanding the rented building. There were multiple proposals for building the church, but the final approval came in 1820. But there were further roadblocks with the East India Company citing clashes over the allotted land. Later it was suggested that the church should be common for Pallavaram and St. Thomas Mount as a 600 seater. The proposal was accepted by the directors and the building was constructed at an estimated cost of ₹43,773. The building was completed in 1827, but was opened only in 1830 by Bishop Turner who had to travel from Calcutta. The Church is declared as a heritage monument under the Chennai Circle of the Archaeological Survey of India.

== Worship services ==
Today, the Church is administered by the Diocese of Madras of the Church of South India. Due to Covid restrictions, daily services have been discontinued. Sunday Service is held in English at 7.30 am. Evening services in regional languages (Tamil Hindi, etc) are held at 6 pm on Sundays. There is also a service held on the first of every month at 7 am.
