= Malayappan Chinnappa =

Archbishop Emeritus of Madras-Mylapore

Archbishop Malayappan Chinnappa S.D.B.
- Archbishop Emeritus of Madras and Mylapore (Meliapor)
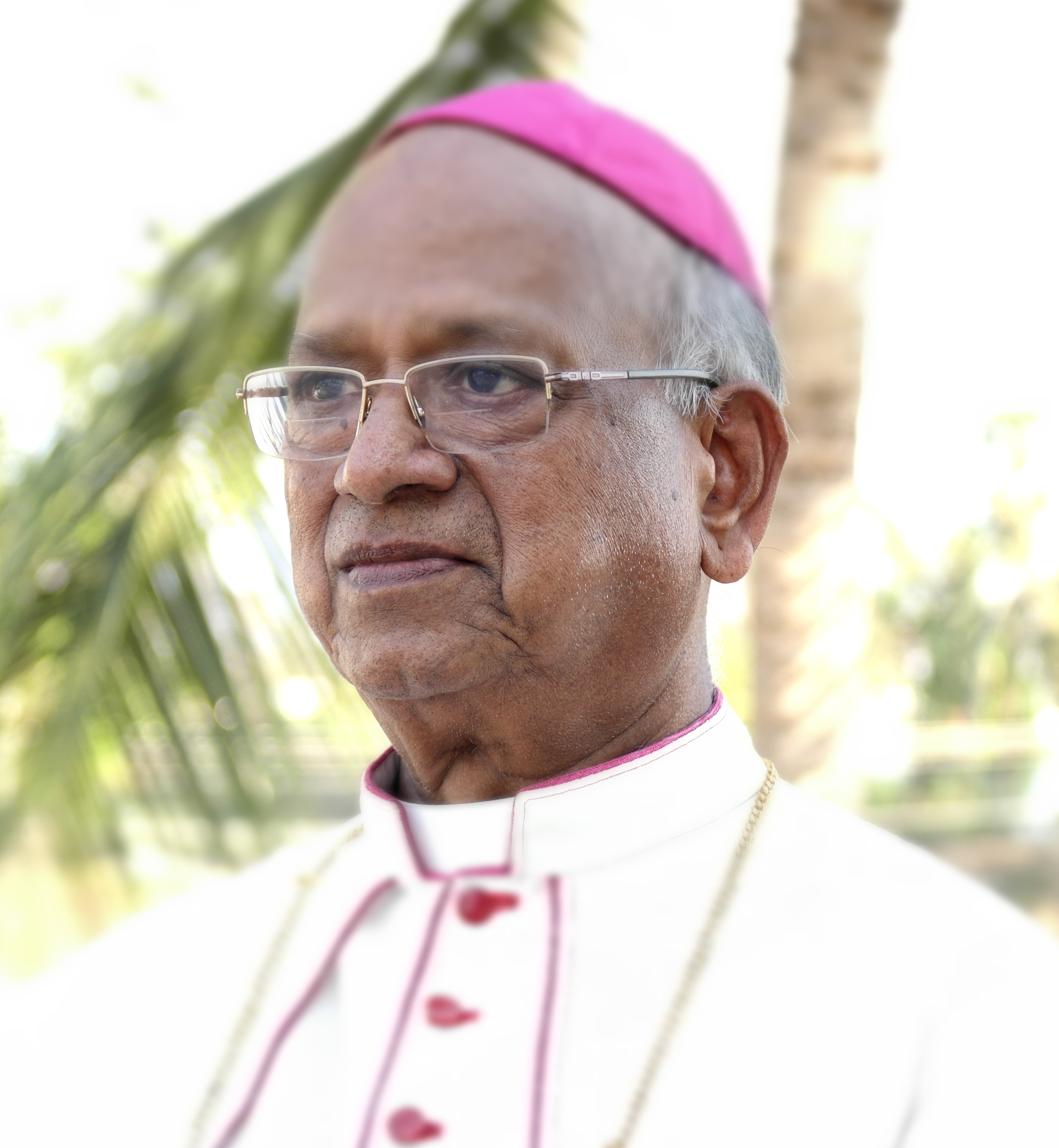
- See: Madras and Mylapore (Meliapor)
- Appointed: 1 April 2005
- Installed: 22 May 2005
- Term ended: 21 November 2012
- Predecessor: James Masilamony Arul Dass
- Successor: George Antonysamy

Orders
- Ordination: 16 December 1972 by Anthony Rayappa Arulappa
- Consecration: 25 January 1994 by Duraisamy Simon Lourdusamy

Personal details
- Born: Malayappan Chinnappa; July 23, 1937 (age 89) Ayandur-Mugaiyur
- Denomination: Catholic
- Parents: Malayappan - Ubagara Mary
- Motto: To Serve and Give My Life For Many

Aesu Malayappan Chinnappa or A. M. Chinnappa is the Archbishop Emeritus of Madras-Mylapore and the Founder of the Society of God's Reign (Currently a Public Association). He was formerly Bishop of Vellore.

== Biography ==
Chinnappa was born on 23 July 1937 at Ayandur which was then a substation of Mugaiyur Parish. He studied a Teacher Training Course with the MEP Fathers in Tindivanam.

He was ordained Priest of Salesians of Don Bosco on 16 December 1972. On November 17, 1993 he was appointed as the Bishop of Vellore by Pope John Paul II. He was ordained as the Bishop of Vellore on January 25, 1994 by Cardinal Duraisamy Simon Lourdusamy. During his time there, he built a new cathedral.

On 1 April 2005 he was appointed as the Archbishop of Madras-Mylapore, the post he held until his retirement on 12 November 2012.

He has held the post of Chairman of the Catholic Bishop's Conference of India Commission on Scheduled Castes/ Scheduled Tribes.

On August 24, 2011 he founded a Religious Institute called the Society of God's Reign.

Ordination history of Malayappan Chinnappa
History
Diaconal ordination
- Ordained by: Duraisamy Simon Lourdusamy
- Date: March 1971
- Place: Kristu Jyoti College, Bangalore
Priestly ordination
- Ordained by: Anthony Rayappa Arulappa
- Date: 16 December 1972
- Place: St. Francis Xavier's Church - Shrine of Mary of Help. Broadway, Chennai.
Episcopal consecration
- Principal consecrator: Duraisamy Simon Lourdusamy
- Co-consecrators: Marianus Arokiasamy Michael Augustine
- Date: 25 January 1994
- Place: Don Bosco, Vellore
Episcopal succession
Bishops consecrated by Malayappan Chinnappa as principal consecrator
- Amalraj Arulappan: 2006
- Soundaraj Periyanayagam: 2006

== See also ==
- Catholic Church in India

Catholic Church titles
Preceded by Michael Augustine	Bishop of Vellore; 17 Nov 1993 - 1 Apr 2005	Succeeded by Soundaraj Periyanayagam, S.D.B.
Preceded by James Masilamony Arul Das	Archbishop of Madras and Mylapore; 1 April 2005 - 21 Nov 2012	Succeeded by George Antonysamy
