= Soundaraj Periyanayagam =

Indian bishop (1949–2020)

Soundaraj Periyanayagam S.D.B.
- Bishop of Vellore
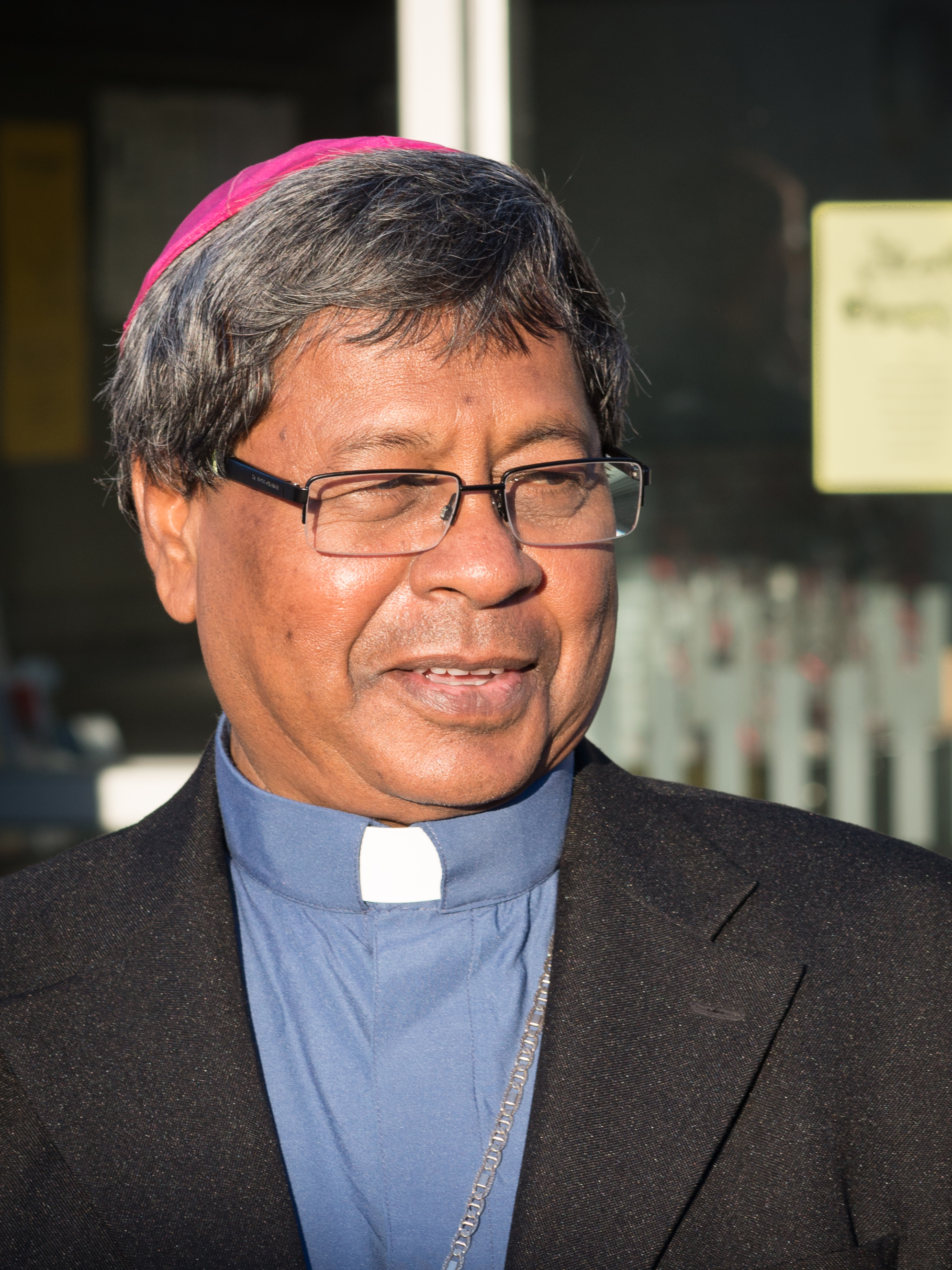
- Native name: சவுந்தராஜ் பெரியநாயகம்
- Church: Catholic Church
- Diocese: Diocese of Vellore
- In office: 11 July 2006 – 21 March 2020
- Predecessor: Malayappan Chinnappa
- Successor: Ambrose Pitchaimuthu

Orders
- Ordination: 25 June 1983
- Consecration: 24 August 2006 by Malayappan Chinnappa

Personal details
- Born: 6 June 1949 Periya Kozhappalur, Province of Madras, Dominion of India, British Empire
- Died: 21 March 2020 (aged 70) Chetpet, Tamil Nadu, India

Soundaraj Periyanayagam (6 June 1949 – 21 March 2020) was an Indian Roman Catholic bishop and salesian priest.

Periyanayagam was born in India and was ordained to the priesthood in 1983.

After gaining his BA in economics from Sacred Heart College, Thirupattur, he continued his studies in economics and theology and returned to Sacred Heart as a teacher; he went on to become the college's principal in 1994.

He was announced as the sixth bishop of the Roman Catholic Diocese of Vellore, on 11 July 2006. He served there until his death in 2020. He died due to cardiac arrest on 21 March 2020.

== Notes ==
Catholic Church titles
Preceded by Malayappan Chinnappa	Bishop of Vellore; 24th August 2006 - 21 March 2020	Succeeded by Ambrose Pitchaimuthu
