= Pablo Mariaselvam =

Indian clergyman and prelate

Pablo Mariaselvam (born 1897 in Trichinopoly) was an Indian clergyman and prelate for the Roman Catholic Diocese of Vellore. He was appointed as the first bishop of Vellore in 1953. He died in 1954.

He was succeeded by Bishop David Maryanayagam Swamidoss Pillat.
