= David Maryanayagam Swamidoss Pillat =

Catholic bishop

David Maryanayagam Swamidoss Pillat (born 1905 in Vallambury - died July 16, 1969 at Kumbakonam Diocese) was an Indian clergyman and prelate for the Roman Catholic Diocese of Vellore. He was appointed bishop in 1956. He succeeded Bishop Pablo Mariaselvam.

During his time as bishop he oversaw the construction of seven churches, fifty chapels, nine presbyteries and seven convents; his motto was ‘Let Jesus and Mary Reign’.

He was succeeded by Bishop Royappan Antony Muthu.
