= Royappan Antony Muthu =

20th-century Indian Catholic bishop

The Most Reverend Royappan Antony Muthu
- Roman Catholic bishop emeritus of Vellore
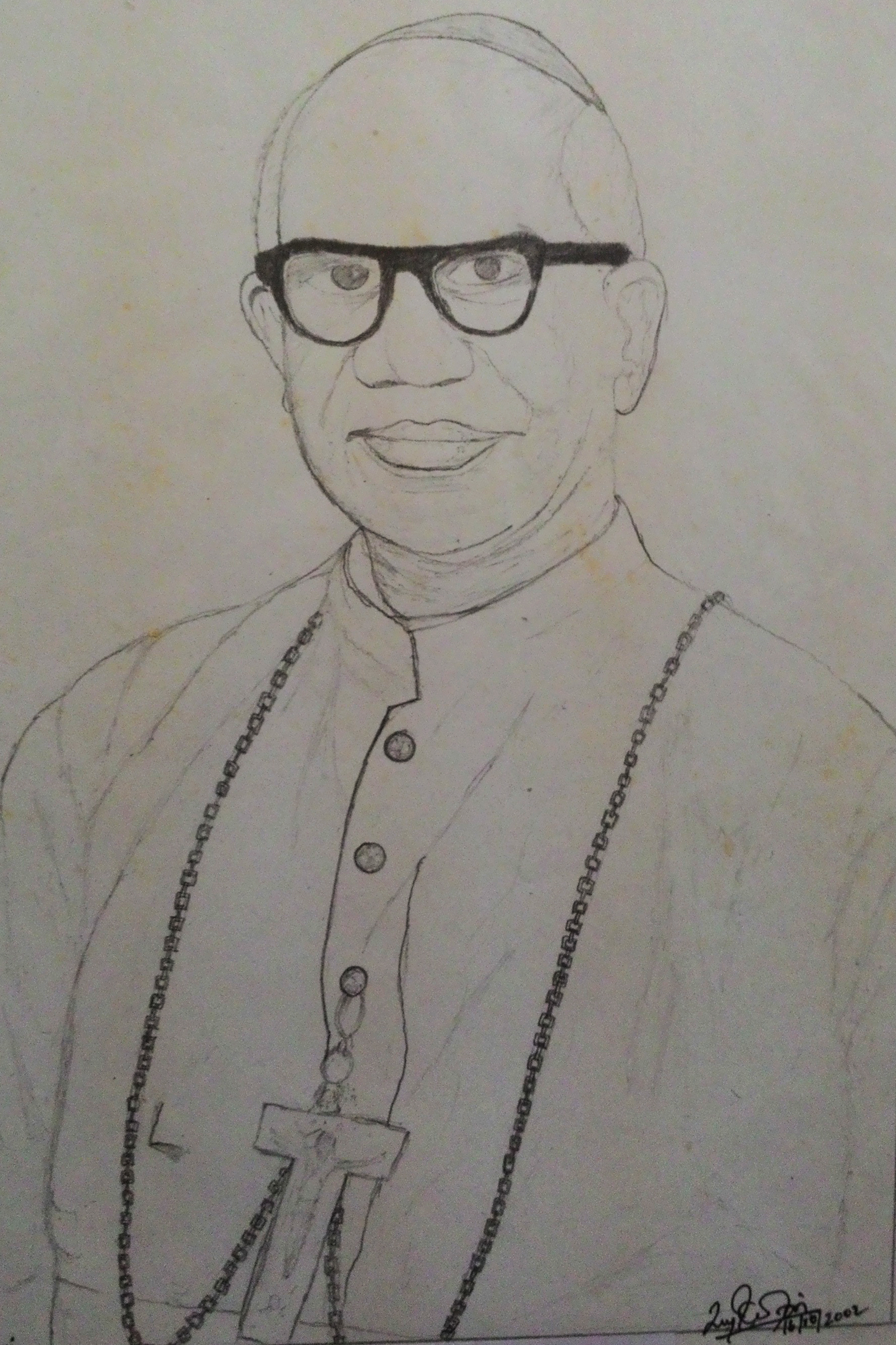
- Bishop Royappan Antony Muthu
- Diocese: Vellore
- See: Vellore
- Installed: 21 April 1971
- Term ended: 19 December 1980
- Predecessor: David Marianayagam
- Successor: Michael Augustine
- Other post: Bishop of Vellore

Orders
- Ordination: 28 March 1936
- Consecration: 21 April 1971

Personal details
- Born: Royappa Antony Muthu; 7 April 1912 Nagercoil, Tamil Nadu, India
- Died: 19 December 1980 Vellore
- Buried: Vellore
- Denomination: Roman Catholic

Styles of Royappan Antony Muthu
- Reference style: The Most Reverend
- Spoken style: Your Excellency
- Religious style: Monsignor

Rayappan Antony Muthu (1912–1980) was the third Bishop of the Roman Catholic Diocese of Vellore in Tamil Nadu, India from 1971 up to his death. He undertook religious and social initiatives, and presided over diocesan boundary changes.

== 1969 boundary change ==
In 1969, in an effort to bring the diocesan boundaries in line with civil districts, the Taluk of Tiruthani in the District of Chingleput, belonging to the Diocese of Vellore, was detached from it and added to the Archdiocese of Madras–Mylapore. In addition, the Taluks of Thiruvannamalai and Chengam in the District of North Arcot, up to then belonging to the Archdiocese of Pondicherry-Cuddalore, were detached from it and added to the Diocese of Vellore.

== Career as Bishop ==
On March 6, 1971, Muthu was nominated as the Bishop of Vellore; he was consecrated bishop on April 21, 1971. He succeeded Bishop David Maryanayagam Swamidoss Pillat.

Mathu established 24 convents in the Diocese of Vellore. He established Perpetual Adoration Monastery of Sisters of Poor Clare at Rangapuram, Sathuvachary as well erecting 17 new parishes. He also saw to the needs of the retired priests in getting a house constructed at Sathuvachary, Vellore. A Mother and Child welfare programme was organized with the help of Catholic Relief Services.

== 1975 boundary change ==
During Muthu's period as Bishop, by a decision dated 20 January 1975, of the Sacred Congregation for the Evangelization of Peoples, the five taluks of the civil district of Chittoor, namely Chittoor, Palmaner, Kuppam, Bangaupalam and Satyavedu belonging to the Diocese of Vellore were detached from it and added to the Diocese of Nellore, Andhra Pradesh.

Muthu died on December 19, 1980.

He was succeeded by Bishop Michael Augustine.
