= Roman Catholic Diocese of Vellore =

Roman Catholic diocese in Tamil Nadu, India

Coordinates: 12.9059°N 79.1304°E

Diocese of Vellore Dioecesis Vellorensis வேலூர் மறைமாவட்டம்
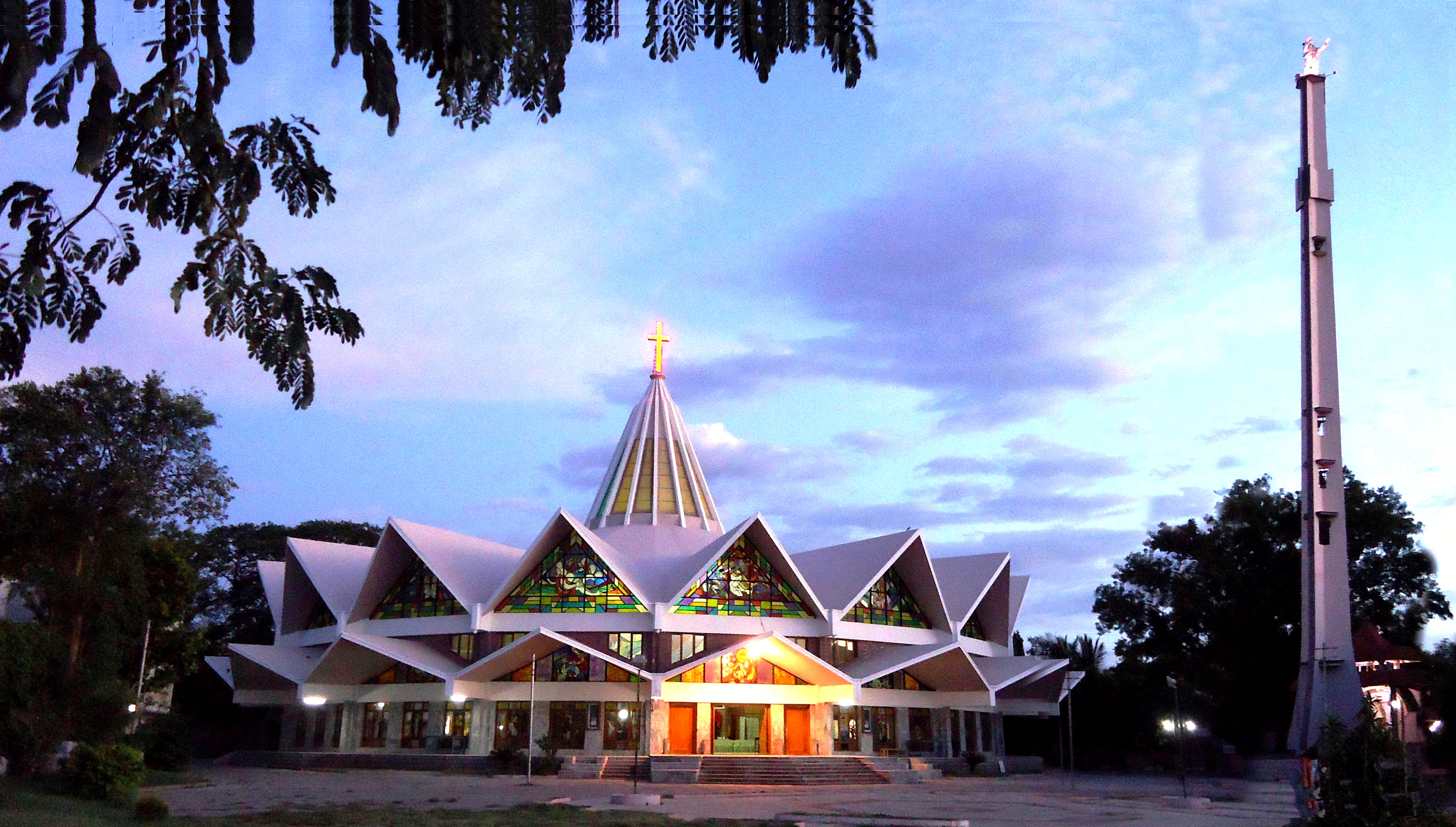
- Assumption Cathedral

Location
- Country: India
- Ecclesiastical province: Madras and Mylapore
- Metropolitan: Madras and Mylapore
- Deaneries: 8

Statistics
- Area: 12,265 km^{2} (4,736 sq mi)
- Population: Total; Catholics: (as of 2010); 10,363,000; 168,980 (1.6%)

Information
- Denomination: Catholic Church
- Rite: Latin Rite
- Established: 13 November 1952
- Cathedral: Cathedral of the Assumption in Vellore
- Patron saint: Mary Help of Christians; St Dominic Savio; St Maria Goretti

Current leadership
- Pope: Leo XIV
- Bishop: Rev. Dr.Ambrose Pitchamuthu
- Metropolitan Archbishop: George Antonysamy
- Vicar General: I. John Robert VG

Website
- Website of the Diocese

The Roman Catholic Diocese of Vellore (Latin: Velloren(sis)) is a diocese located in the city of Vellore in the ecclesiastical province of Madras and Mylapore in India.

In 2017, the diocese had a population of 6.5 million people, with the main languages spoken being Tamil, Telugu, and Urdu.

== History ==
The Diocese of Vellore was established on 13 November 1952, from the Metropolitan Archdiocese of Madras. It was initiated by the Salesians, who carved out a portion from the Archdiocese of Madras-Mylapore. Additionally, in 1969, several parishes from the Archdiocese of Pondicherry-Cuddalore were incorporated into this Diocese. It encompasses two civil districts, namely Vellore and Tiruvannamalai, and consists of 84 parishes with a Catholic population of 150,000.

=== Origin as a Jesuit mission ===
The Catholic Mission in North Arcot traces its origins back to 1604. The following chronicles, gathered from various sources, provide historical insight into the Mission, detailing its foundation and development over a span of more than 350 years.

In January 1604, Venkatapathy Deva Rayalu, the last great prince of the declining Vijayanagar empire (now in Andhra Pradesh), conquered the kingdom of Vellore and named it Raya Elluru. In Telugu, Elapuri or Elluru denotes a city or town. Thus, Raya Elluru signified a town conquered by King Rayalu, and the town was named after him, combining the words "Raya" and "Elapuri."

During that period, Jesuit Fathers were present at the court of King Rayalu at Chandragiri. He later invited them to his new court at Vellore. The word "Vellore" is believed to derive from the Tamil word "Vel," which means "spear." Another conjecture suggests that idols of the Tamil God "Murugan" holding a "Vel" were present in and around Vellore. The town was formerly known as Velappadi, named after a location densely surrounded by a particular tree called "Velamaram." Due to this association, the name Vellore came into existence. The Jesuits, accompanied by their followers, were permitted by the King to rebuild in the area, which is now associated with the Anglican Church. Ancient Jesuit documents indicate the presence of a Jesuit named Fr. Antonious Rubunus, a preacher and confessor, who traveled between Chandragiri and Vellore. He was sent to Japan on 12 August 1642, and martyred at Nagasaki on 22 March 1643. In 1610, there was a general upheaval against the Jesuits.

The Jesuit residences at Chandragiri and Vellore were disbanded by a Royal order of King Philip III of Spain and Portugal in 1611. Formal Christian faith began to spread in the diocese of Vellore towards the latter part of the 17th century through the efforts of the Madurai Mission. Fr. Andrew Preyre, S.J., appears to have been among the first to evangelize Vellore. St. John de Britto and his disciple Fr. Francis Laynis visited Vellore in 1680 and 1683. Fr. Francis Laynis, later Bishop of Mylapore, established the mission of Koratampet in 1683 and 1691, which was the first mission in the present diocese of Vellore, located in the Taluk of Chengam, North Arcot district, approximately 80 kilometers southwest of Vellore.

In 1699, the first French Jesuit Missionaries settled in Pondicherry after the closure of the Mission of Siam. In 1700, a certain Fr. Mandayat initiated the Jesuit Carnatic Mission at Puliyur, south of Uthiramerur, Chinglepet district, adopting a lifestyle akin to Indian Sanyasis, similar to the practices of the Fathers of the Madurai Mission during that era.

Vellore was surrounded by the Mughals and subsequently taken over by them in the following year. In 1702, Fr. Mandayat founded the mission of Thakkolam (Arakonam Taluk), which was later placed under the care of Fr. Varance Bouchet. In 1703, he faced persecution and was arrested. However, he was later released by the Governor of the Province, Sek Sahib, at the intervention of Fr. Pierre Martin. During his brief stay at Vellore, he decided to establish a chapel and residence under the patronage of Mary. Later, he and his catechist were expelled from the city after being severely beaten. It was evident that the Mughals did not welcome the establishment of Christianity in Vellore.

In 1712, Fr. De La Fontain, Superior of the Carnatic Mission, intervened to halt the persecution carried out by Prince Dewan Hall. He approached the Nawab of Arcot through a Catholic Medical officer of the Nawab of Vellore, resulting in the cessation of hostilities.

In 1736, Fr. Jacques de Saignes oversaw the construction of two churches in Vellore and Arcot. During his month-long stay in these places, he received meals from the Rayal palace.

In 1740, when the Maharaja moved from Vellore to Gingee, Fr. Joseph Trumbley was in charge of Athipakkam (South Arcot) and Koratampet (North Arcot). He reported that one of his churches was plundered, another burnt down, and the church at the Fort of Vellore was destroyed. Additionally, 21 villages, where most parishioners lived, were sacked, resulting in numerous Catholic casualties and displacements.

In 1748, the Nawab of Vellore granted one and a half acres of dry land to the priest, along the road, and another piece of land near the hill at Vellore. Similar grants were made to the priest at Arcot. During this period, Nawabs were responsible for allocating lands to priests as the Zamindars were unwilling to do so.

In 1774, when Punganur (Andhra Pradesh) was occupied by Hyder Ali, a group of Telugu Catholics were brought by Fr. Henri Arnoult to Christianpet (North Arcot). Two families of Rajas from Rajampet in Cuddappah were baptized and subsequently employed by the Nawab of Vellore. Their descendants reside in Christianpet, located 10 kilometers north of Vellore.

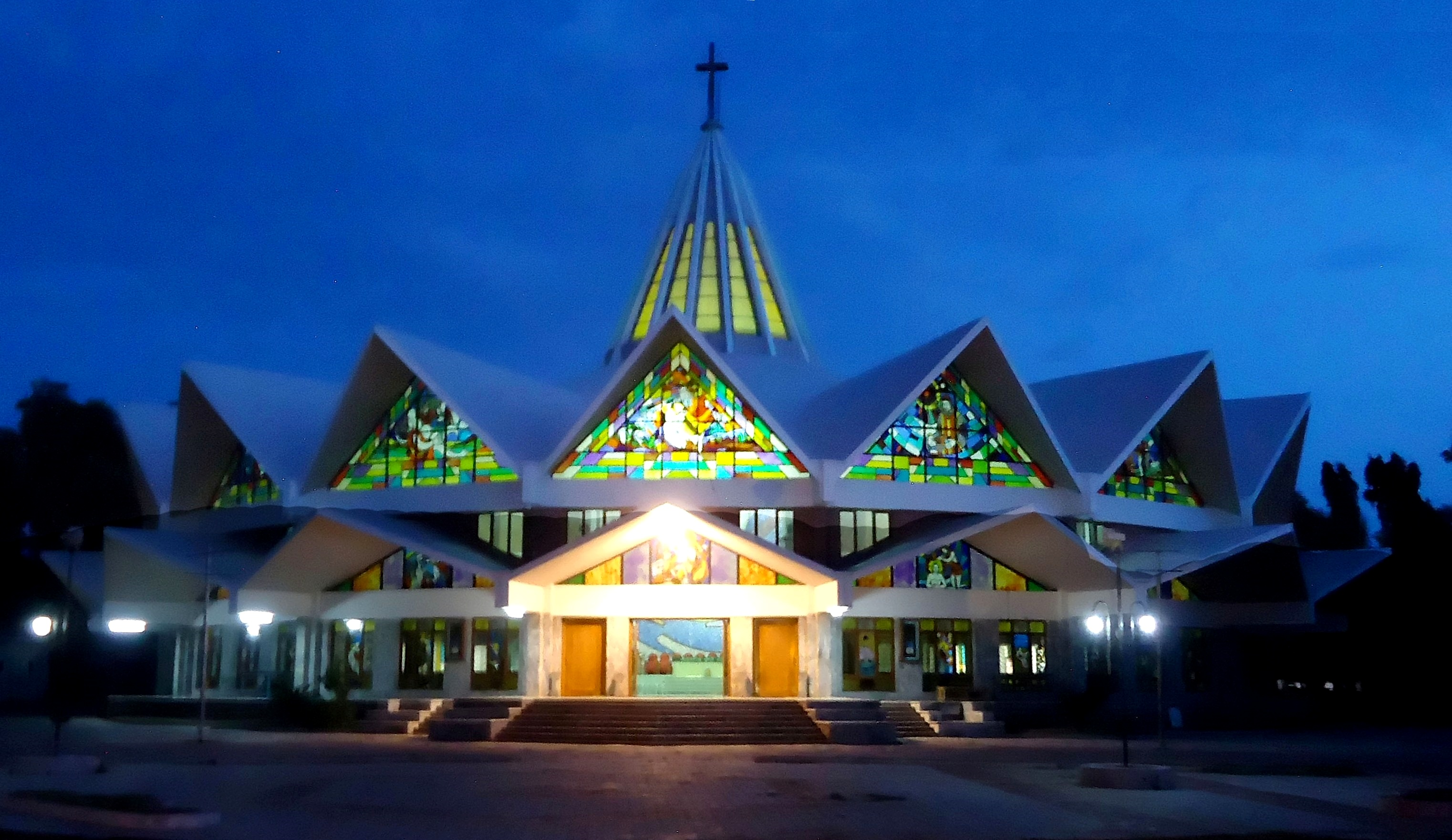
The Assumption Cathedral in Vellore

=== Missionaries of the Foreign Missions Society, Paris ===
In 1777, the Fathers of the Paris Foreign Missions who were at Pondicherry were given charge of the former Jesuit South Indian Mission under the general name of Malabar Mission, which was also called formerly Carnatic Mission and formerly Pondicherry Mission. The Mission among Tamils was known as the Mission in the province of Arcot. It fared rather badly.

In 1784, the persecution of Tippu Sultan dispersed several Catholic communities from the ancient Carnatic Mission in Rayalaseema. Some groups went to Vellore under the protection of the British. The Mudali Catholics of Pudur moved of Koratampet and Telugu Reddies and Kavarais settled at Kaniyambady, 12 km South of Vellore.

In 1801, there were about 2,000 Catholics in the region of Vellore. In 1806, Fr. Arnoult died. Fr. Manenty died on 25 May 1812. Fr. Jean Austruay of the Paris Foreign Missions took charge of the Catholics of Vellore region. In 1817, a church was begun at Kortampet. In 1834, Msgr. Bonnand, as co-adjuster to the Prefect Apostolic of Pondicherry, came to Vellore for his first pastoral visitation. A church was built there at the foot of the western hills.

=== Creation of Vicariates Apostolic ===
When the Vicariates Apostolic were created in 1832, Vellore and Southern part of North district formed part of the Vicariate Apostolic of Pondicherry under the Paris Foreign Missions. The North and North Eastern parts of the district, beyond the Trunk Road of Madras – Bangalore, namely the three taluks of Arakonam, Walajapet and Gudiyattam came to form part of the Vicariate Apostolic of Madras and it was entrusted to Mill Hill Fathers.

In 1841, the church at Koratampet was completed. It measured 60 ft. by 15 ft. In 1846 the mission of Vellore had 3,341 Catholics, mostly from the depressed outcaste people. They were served by a priest, four catechists, one school, a main church and eight chapels.

Arcot cantonment had 484 Catholics, including those in the light cavalry; Kaveripakkam had three or four Catholic families; Alapakkam had about 100 Catholics, and Christianpet had 13 families. Due to the inadequate size and poor condition of the old church at Vellore, a new church was initiated in 1847, with the site of a local tank bed purchased for Rs. 200. In 1850, Fr. Moncourrier of the Paris Foreign Missions built a church and presbytery at Adakambarai on land donated by two Catholics. On 9 February 1854, the new church at Vellore was solemnly blessed by Msgr. Bonnand.

After 100 years, the church was found to be in a deteriorated condition and required extensive repairs. With a sum of one lakh rupees, it was renovated, expanded, and remodeled. It served as the Cathedral church of the diocese of Vellore from 1952. Subsequently, the church underwent further extensions with the addition of two wings featuring new concrete slab structures. It was consecrated on 3 January 1988, by Cardinal Duraisamy Simon Lourdusamy, the Prefect of the Congregation for Oriental Churches, during the tenure of Fr. A. Nambikairaj as the Parish Priest.

In 1884, the Catholic population numbered 3,376 in Vellore, 1,429 in Kortampet, 2,473 in Polur, 2,546 in Koviloor, and 15,751 in Chettupattu and Arni. Archbishops Joseph Morel of Pondicherry (1909–1929) and Mederlet (1928–1934) of Madras played significant roles in the formation of the diocese of Vellore during its initial stages.

Pondicherry missionary Fr. Francis Darras, also called the Apostle of North Arcot, welcomed into the Church 30,000 persons and founded several parishes in North Arcot district during 1876–1916. He built the Shrine of Our Lady of Lourdes at Chethupattu in 1896 and a chapel on the hill near by in 1880. It is now the Shrine of Our Blessed Lady and the biggest center of pilgrimage in the diocese of Vellore.

=== Arrival of Salesians of Don Bosco ===
In April 1928, the mission of North Arcot with nine parishes, which were under the French Fathers, was consigned by the Holy See to the Salesians of Don Bosco. After three months, Fr. Eugene Mederlet, the first Salesian parish priest of Vellore, was made Archbishop of Madras to succeed Bishop Aelen John (1911–1928). The Archbishop of Madras was entrusted to the Salesians of Don Bosco, and the Salesian mission of North Arcot and the three taluks of Palmaner, Tiruthanni and Chittoor in the civil district of Chittoor were added to the territory of the Archdiocese to Madras. After the death of the Archbishop Mederlet on 12 December 1934, Bishop Louis Mathias was transferred from the See of Shillong to the Archdiocese of Madras, and he took charge of it on 20 July 1935 and governed it till 1965. One of his outstanding achievements was the formation of the dioceses of Vellore and Thanjavur in 1952.

=== Favourable factors for Christianity in North Arcot ===
The Portuguese had control over coastal areas of Tamil Nadu and Santhome (Mylapore) in the 16th and the first half of the 17th centuries. Whenever the Portuguese exercised any authority or influence they supported the spread of Catholicism. The interior of Tamil Nadu was influenced by Mughal ruler Akbar with his friendly attitude to all religions, and similarly by Tirumala Nayak and Queen Mangammal of Madurai and the Kathirava Narasmiah Raj Udayar of Mysore. They all allowed the Christian priests to preach freely in their territories and convert the people to Christianity. The last great prince Venkatapathy Deva Rayalu of Vijayanagar conquered the kingdom of Vellore in 1604 and as we mentioned earlier, he kept two Jesuit priests in his court, first at Chandragiri and later at Vellore, and allowed them to build a church at Vellore fort.

The first Portuguese Jesuits were called back by king Philip III due to their scandalous life, and this hindered evangelisation. Fr. Rubino wrote to the Jesuit general "The missionaries must adapt themselves to Indian customs".

The Renaissance period created a spirit of conquest among the Europeans. The period of Reformation helped to reduce corruption in the Church structures – the clergy, religious and similar organisations.

== Important Churches in the Diocese ==
=== St.Anthony's shrine Viruduvilanginan ===
Viruduvilanginan was a sub-station of Athipakkam Parish, Pondicherry Archdiocese. Seven years before Fr. Anthony Thumma, the parish priest of Athipakkam, wanted to make it a separate parish. At that time, in November 1969, when the portions of North Arcot in Tiruvannamalai and Chengam Districts were detached from Pondicherry Archdiocese and attached to Vellore Diocese, Viruduvilenginan was one of those sub-stations with a good number of Catholic families, which became part of the Diocese of Vellore.

S. Lazar, the Vicar Capitular of the Diocese erected the village as a parish and appointed Rev.Fr. A. Nambikairaj as its first priest on 16 February 1970. There are 3 sub-stations, namely, Porrikal, Kadagaman and Valavetty. Fr. A. Nambikairaj started to put up a shrine of St Antony on 16 December 1970. The large granite shrine, built of was blessed on 13 June 1976, the feast of St. Antony. The shrine is still visited by many.

=== St Lordhu's Shrine, Chetpet ===
The Mission of Chethupattu, under missionary priest Jean Francois Darras, dates back to 1876. He was born of Mr. Francois Joseph and Marie Josephine Dowey on 16 March 1835. He was ordained on 18 June 1859 along with eight companions. He came to Pondicherry as a missionary; from there he came to the diocese of Vellore. Chethupattu was made a separate Parish on 11 March 1878.

Fr. Darras had taken a vow to build a shrine in honour of Our Lady of Lourdes and built it on a hill top about 2 ½ miles away from Chethupattu. Since this Church was too small, Fr. Darras built a larger one and dedicated it to Our Lady of Lourdes. It was blessed on 1 May 1896, by Rev. Gandi. The feast of Our Lady of Lourdes is celebrated there in the first week of May.

In 1948 the parish priest, later Bishop of North Arcot, S. David Marianayagam, built the present Hill Chapel to replace the old one. Chethupattu has a population of 4,000 Catholics with 21 mission stations. It has a High Secondary School for boys and one for girls, and five Elementary Schools. Sisters of St. Anne's Madavaram manage the Higher Secondary School for Girls. There are more than 2,000 pupils. The parish also contains the St. Thomas Hospital and Leprosy Centre. Missionaries include Frs. A. Fernandes, F. Capiaghi, M. Arockiasamy, F. Schlooz, Maria Arul, Peter Mathew, S. Susai and Fr. Thomas George. The Centenary of the shrine of Our Lady of Lourdes was celebrated in March 1978.

Fr. Kuriakos on 26 January 2002 started Marivalam in the hill chapel of Chetpet.

=== Cathedral ===
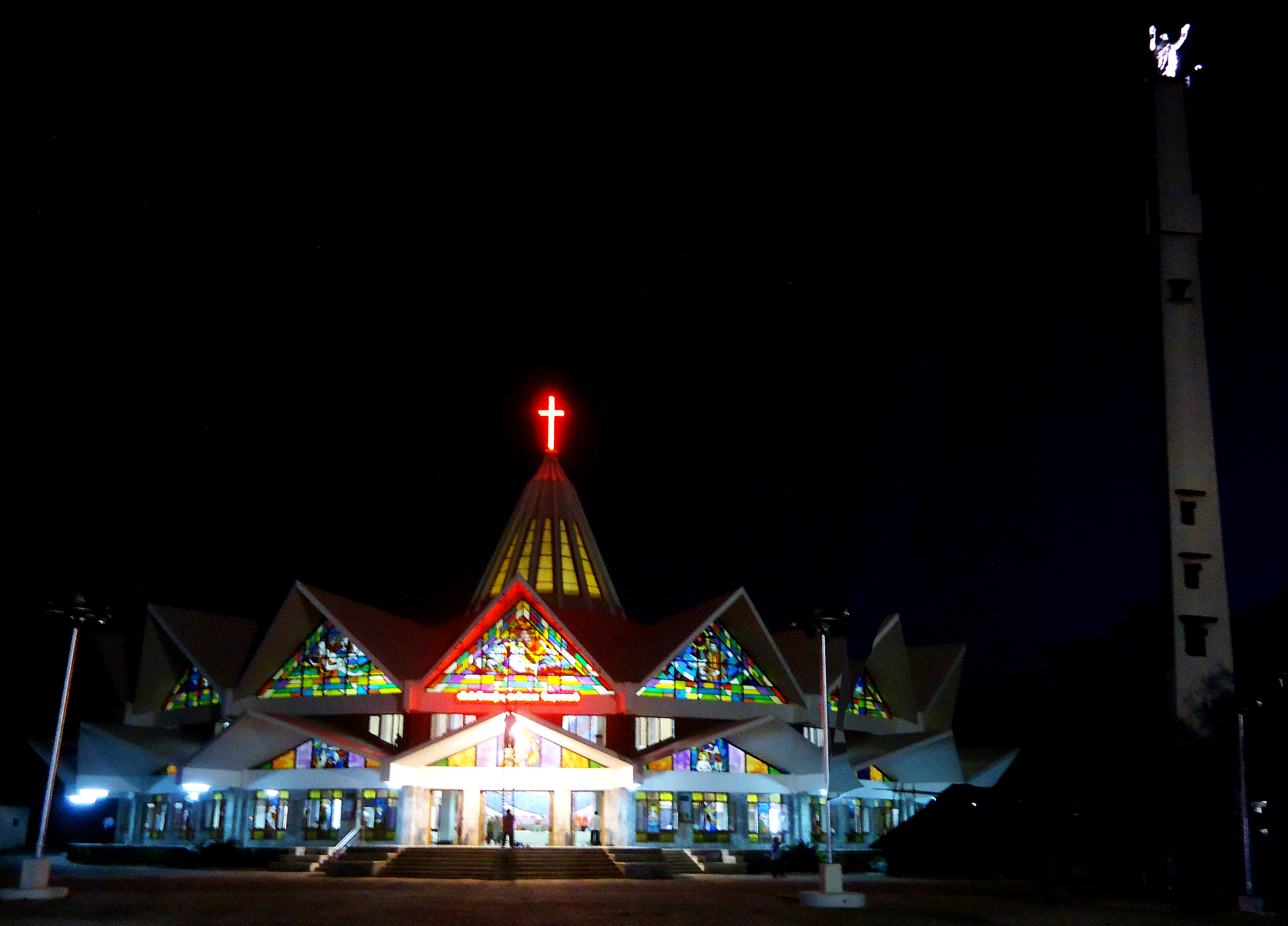
View of the cathedral at night

==== History of the cathedral ====
The Society of Jesus spread Christianity in Vellore from 1604. In 1854 Vellore was made a parish. In the same year, Assumption church was built. It was under the Madras Archdiocese and looked after by the Mill-Hill Fathers. In 1928, the North Arcot mission was entrusted to the care of Salesians of Don Bosco. On 13 November 1952, Catholic Diocese of Vellore was bifurcated from Arch Diocese Madras-Mylapore and Assumption church was announced as the cathedral of the new born Diocese of Vellore. In 1955, David Maria Nayagam, Bishop of Vellore Diocese, repaired the Assumption Cathedral and consecrated it. During the time of Bishop Michael Augustine, Rev. Msgr. A. Nambikairaj built the right and left wings of the cathedral.

==== The new cathedral ====
Even with these extensions, the cathedral had space only for 300 to 500 people. So during the reign of Bishop Chinnappa, the cathedral was demolished and the basement for the new cathedral was blessed on 24 May 1999. The new Cathedral was consecrated on 15 September 2002 by Simon D. Lourdusamy and opened by Bernard Prince. Blessed Sacrament chapel, prayer meeting hall, Glass paintings of 18 important events of salvific history and 15 mysteries of Rosary, and 165 feet height Belfry are special features of the new cathedral. The present cathedral has a capacity for 3,000 to 5,000 people.

== Bishops ==
- Bishops of Vellore (Latin Rite)
  - Bishop Pablo Mariaselvam, S.D.B. (1953 – 25 June 1954)
  - Bishop David Maryanayagam Swamidoss Pillat, S.D.B. (4 July 1956 – 17 July 1969)
  - Bishop Royappan Antony Muthu (23 November 1970 – 19 December 1980)
  - Bishop Michael Augustine (10 June 1981 – 18 February 1992), appointed Archbishop of Pondicherry and Cuddalore
  - Bishop Malayappan Chinnappa, S.D.B. (17 November 1993 – 1 April 2005), appointed Archbishop of Madras and Mylapore
  - Bishop Soundaraj Periyanayagam, S.D.B. (11 July 2006 – 21 March 2020)
  - Sede Vacante (22 March 2020 - 8 November 2024)
  - Bishop Rev. Dr. Ambrose Pitchamuthu,(9 November 2024 – )

=== Other priests of this diocese who became bishops ===
- Thomas Aquinas Lephonse, appointed Bishop of Coimbatore in 2002
- Stephen Antony Pillai, appointed Bishop of Tuticorin in 2019

In January 2024, Father Roy Lazar from Vellore diocese became the President of the Conference of Diocesan Priests of India (CDPI).
