= Periya Kozhappalur =

Periya Kolappalur
- Village
- Location in Tamil Nadu, India Periya Kolappalur (India)
- Coordinates: 12.34°N 79.20°E
- Country: India
- State: Tamil Nadu
- District: Thiruvanamalai
- Elevation: 216 m (709 ft)

Languages
  - Official: Tamil
- Time zone: UTC+5:30 (IST)
- PIN: 632 313
- Telephone code: 91-(0)4183
- Vehicle registration: TN 25 TN 97

Periya Kozhappalur is a village in Chetpet Taluk, Tiruvannamalai District, Tamil Nadu, India (Pin code: 632313. STD Code: 04183). Periya Kozhappalur is located 2 kilometres (1.2 mi) east of the state highway SH-4, between Arani and Chetpet, 14 kilometres (8.7 mi) from Arani, 40 kilometres (25 mi) from Vandavasi, and 11 kilometres (6.8 mi) from its taluk main town of Chetpet. Kolappalur is 47 kilometres (29 mi) from its district main city Tiruvannamalai. It is 132 kilometres (82 mi) from its state capital Chennai.

== Overview ==
Periya Kolappalur is one of the meeting points for 15 villages in these surroundings like a mini shopping place. Not only shopping place for higher secondary education, English medium education, medical as well for few village bus facilities. The village is situated on the banks of the Cheyyar River which originates in the Jawadhu Hills near Chengam and later joins the Palar River at Walaja.

There are no railway stations less than 10 km from Periya Kolappalur. However Katpadi Jn Railway Station is a major railway station 58 km near Kolappalur. Melmaruvathur Junction is located about 50 km from here. The nearest airport is in Meenambakkam, Chennai by car 130 km (3hrs); by bus it may take 4–5 hrs.

In 2000 this village got a full-fledged telephone connection from the Tamil Nadu government. Nowadays the village is connected to the world arena with the major mobile operators. Before telephone connection this village got quality television cable connectivity from the private sector.

There are some silk weavers producing silk similar to that from Arni. Cultivation of rice, sugarcane, groundnut and other grains are the main food source of this village. Roadside coconut trees and clean roads lend some beauty to this village.

Earlier this came under Vandavasi Lok Sabha constituency. After the delimitation by the Election Commission of India, now the village comes under Arani Lok Sabha constituency. The same time the village was coming under Peranamallur Legislative Assembly, but Peranamallur Legislative Assembly was scrapped and added it into Polur.

The views of Nedungunam Mountain and Padavedu Mountain give beauty to this village. This village has a huge lake and two small lakes as well as several small ponds apart from Cheyyar River. If Kozhappalur huge lake fills once, people can cultivate rice three times in year, not from only this village but also a few adjacent villages like Dhuli and Imapuram. During this time a lot of fish are available from this lake, including viral, keluthi, gilaby and kendai meen.

The village has a Ratham (தேர்). Every year in July (Aadi Masam), it is taken around the village twice (தேர் திருவிழா), with one day for the Panaiamman தேர் and Mariyamman தேர். The three-day festival is observed in Periya Kozhappalur and the adjacent villages, in addition to the Tamil (தமிழ்) New Year, Pongal (பொங்கல்) and Diwali festivals. Many people gather at this time. Before the Ratham Festival (தேர் திருவிழா), a Magabartham storytelling program is held during the day for 15 days. This is followed by five days of stage drama about the Magabaratham, including the Ratham Festival (தேர் திருவிழா). One day also has a fire stamping festival (தீமிதி திருவிழா).

Jain peoples celebrate the Kannum Pongal festival at the time of Pongal. The first Tirthankarar of Jains Lord Virushba Nathar (lord Adhi Nathar) idol in decorating chariot runs on Mada streets. In April Jains, celebrate Mahaveer Jayanthi. In May, Jains celebrate the Atchaya Tiritiyai as Dhana Poojai.

Krishna Jayanthi, Ugathi and all Hindu festival are also celebrated. Most of the street people separately celebrate Koozhvarkkum Thiruvizha.

Christian people used to celebrate Arokkia Annai Thear Thiruvizha apart from their Christmas.

== Religion ==
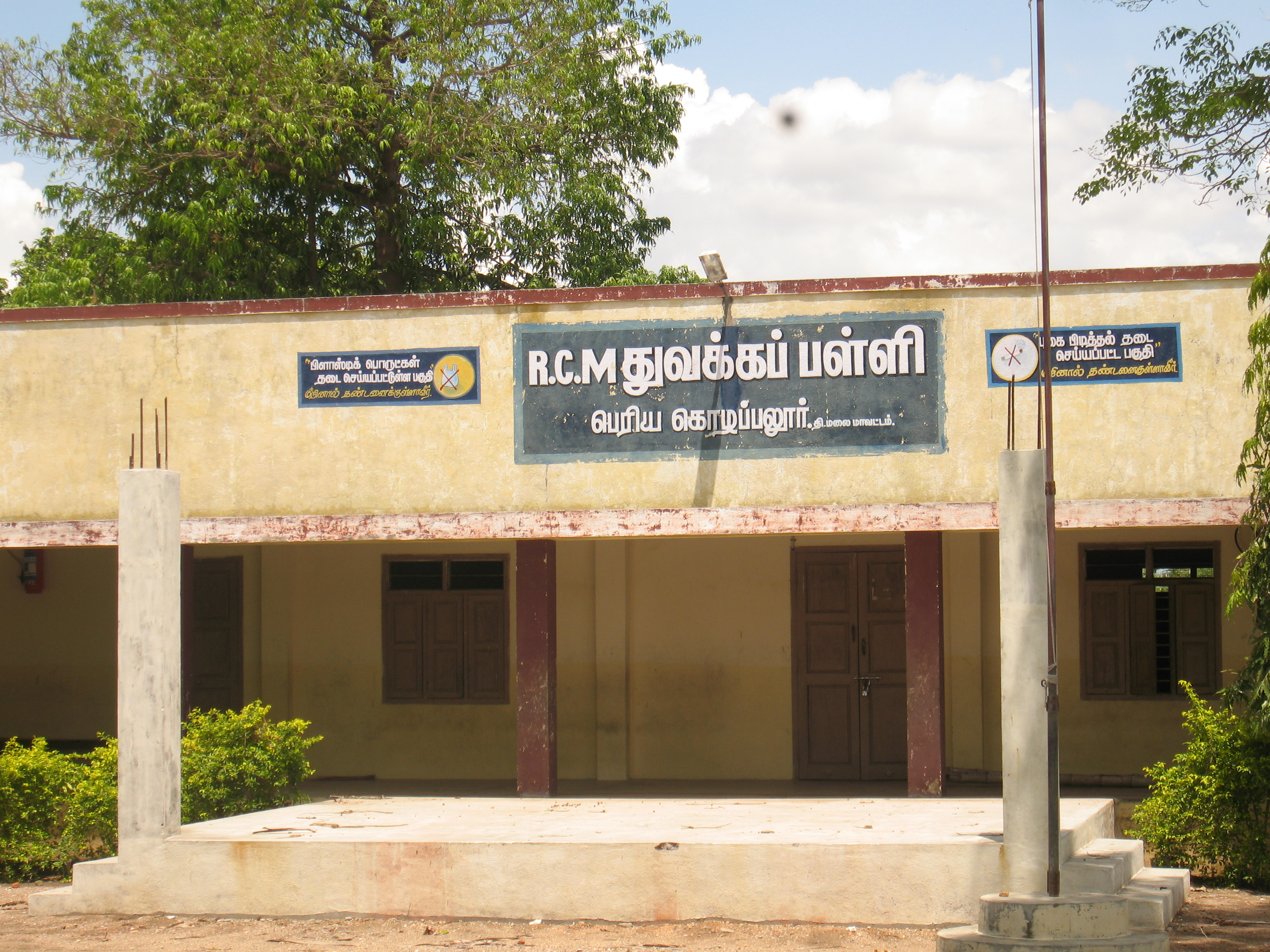
RCM school

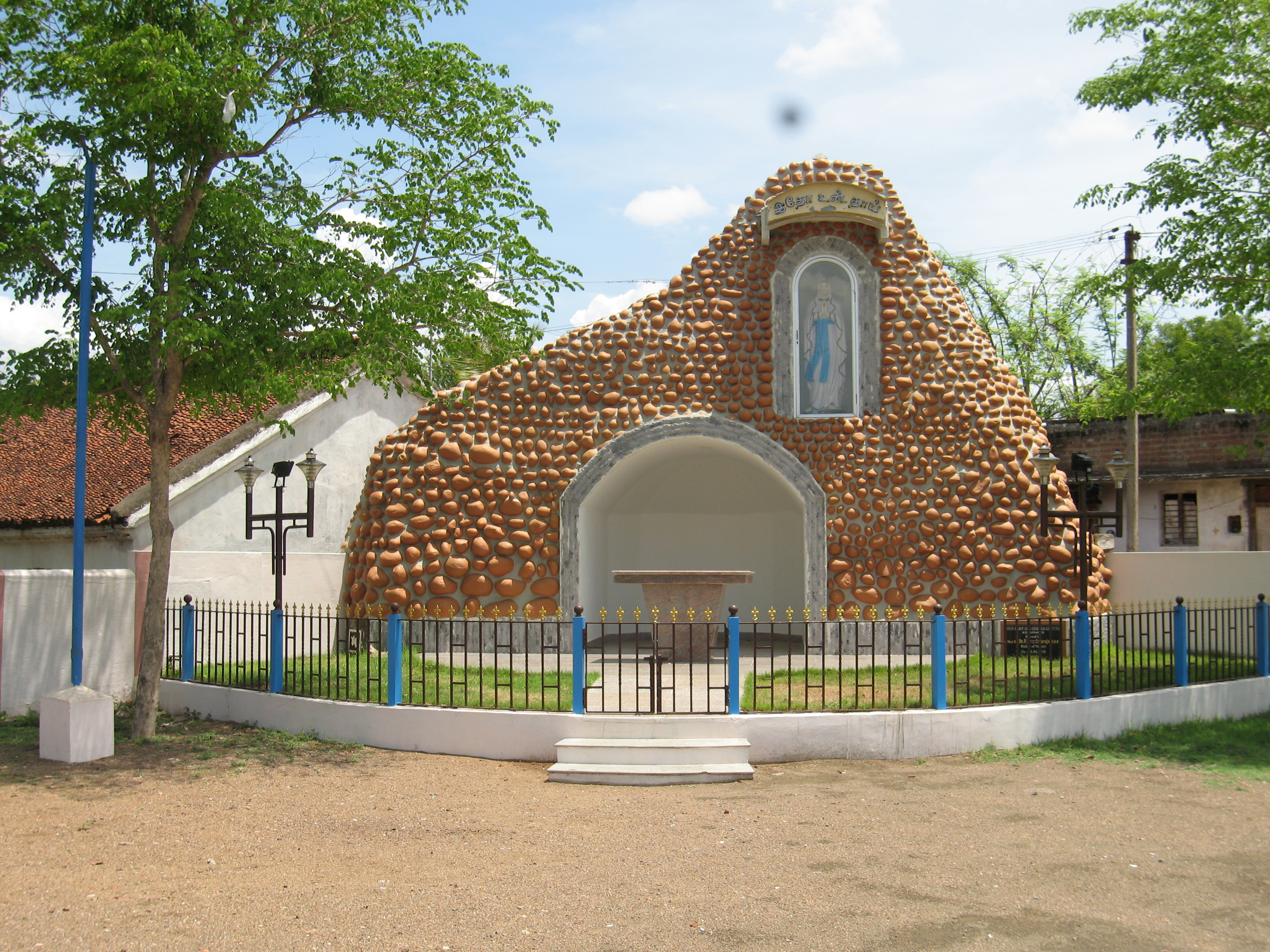

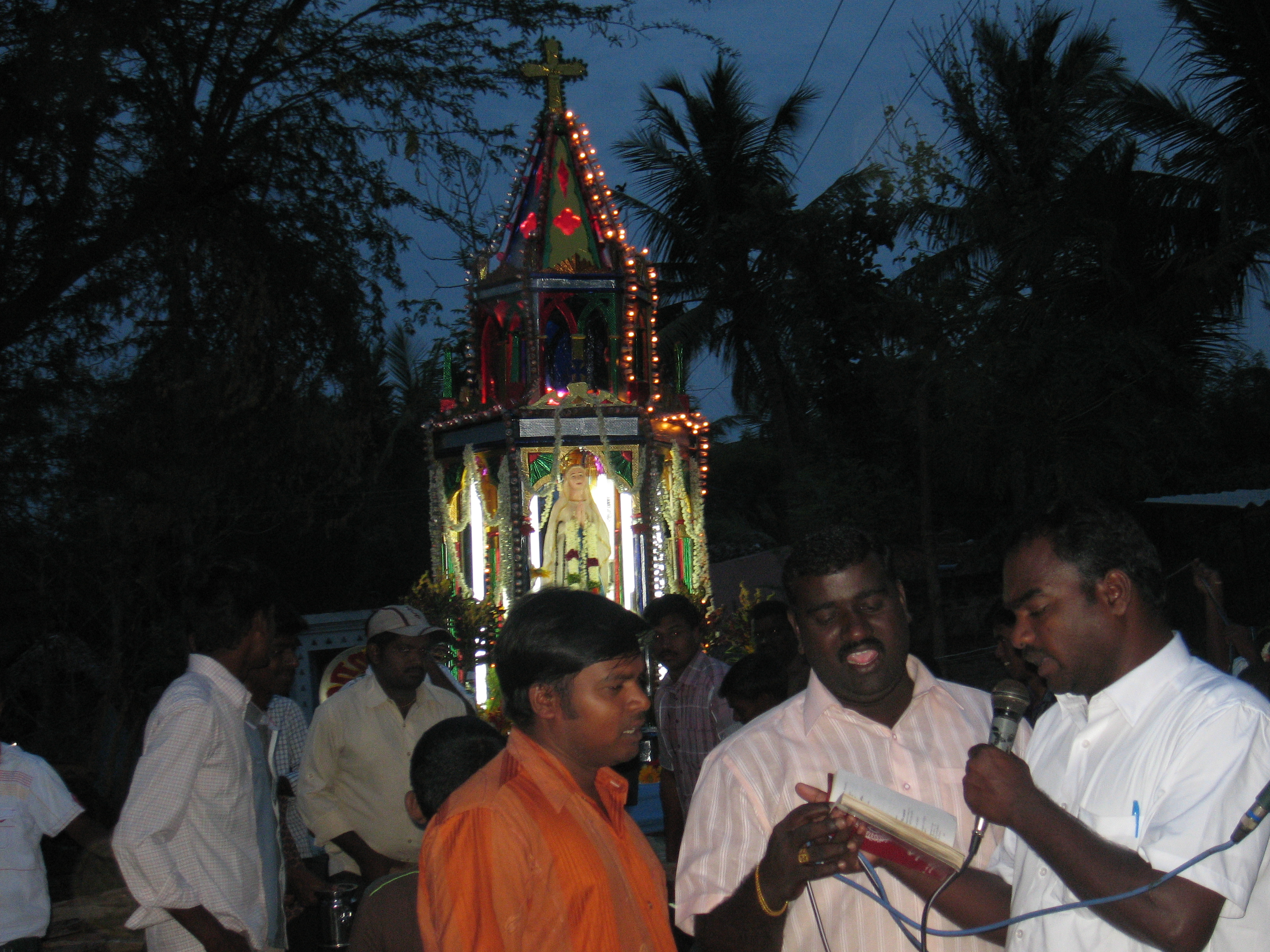

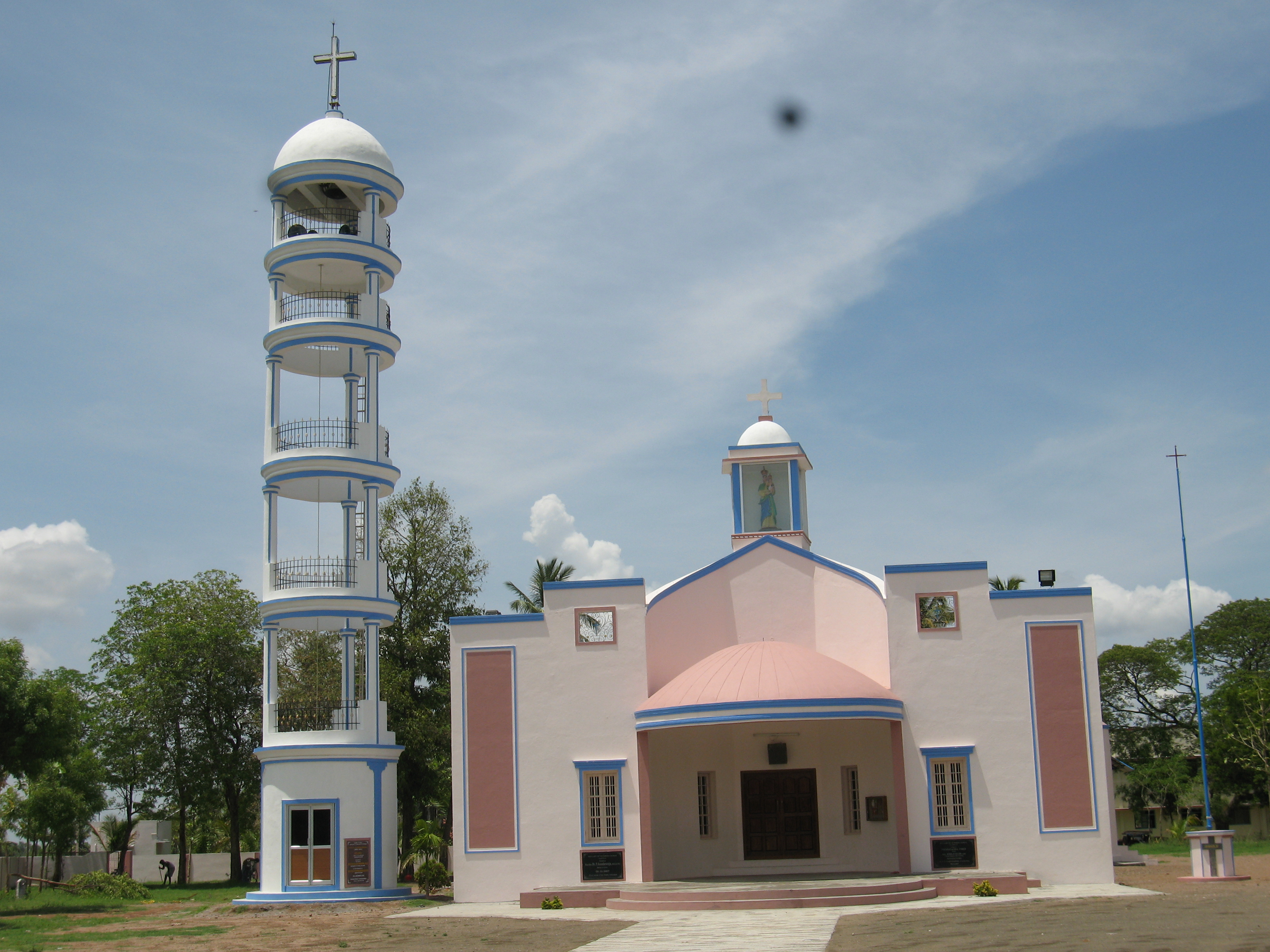

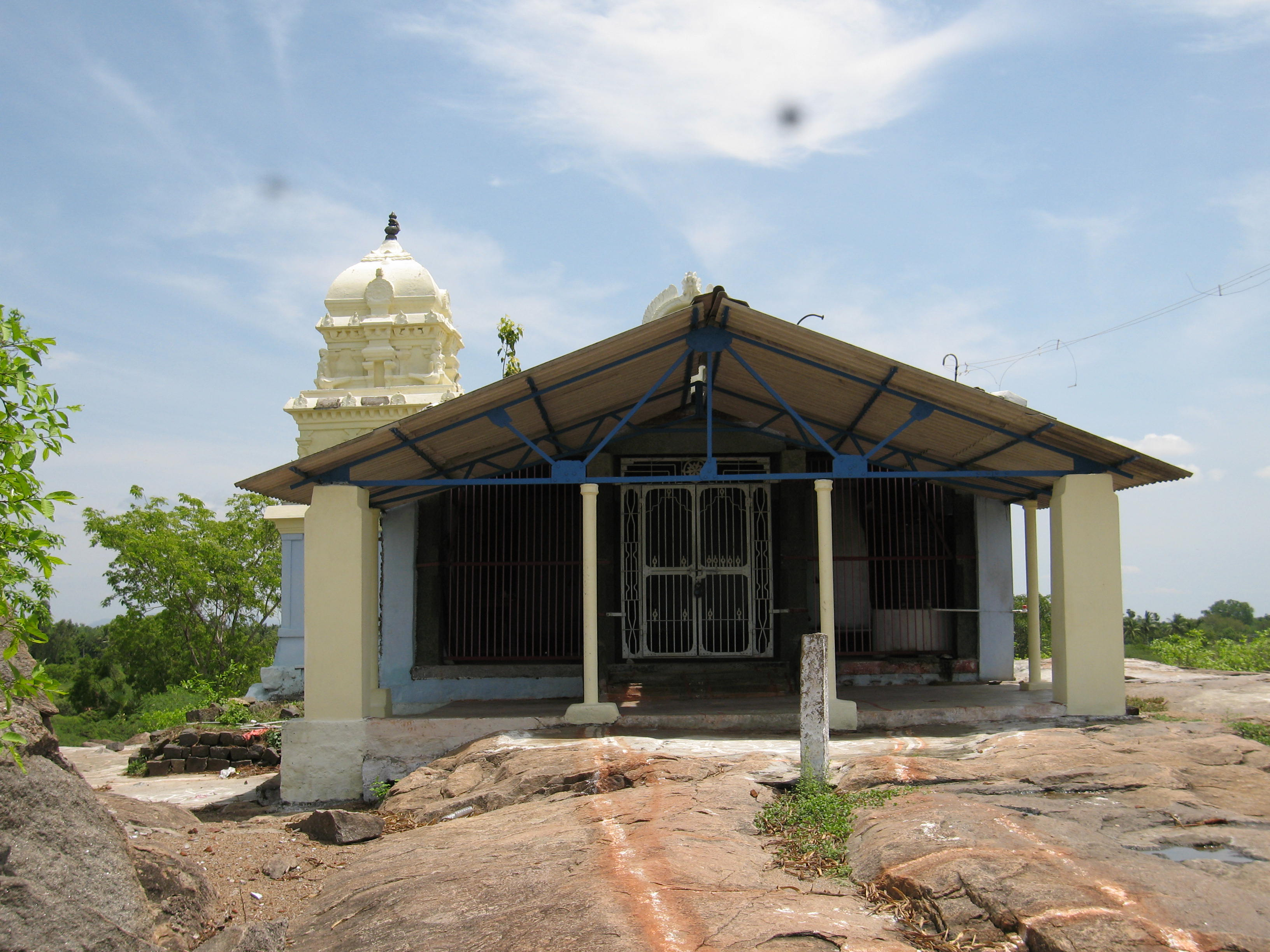

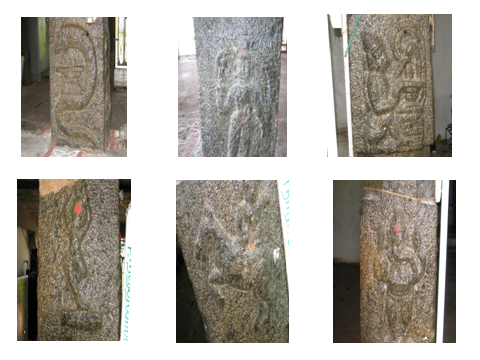

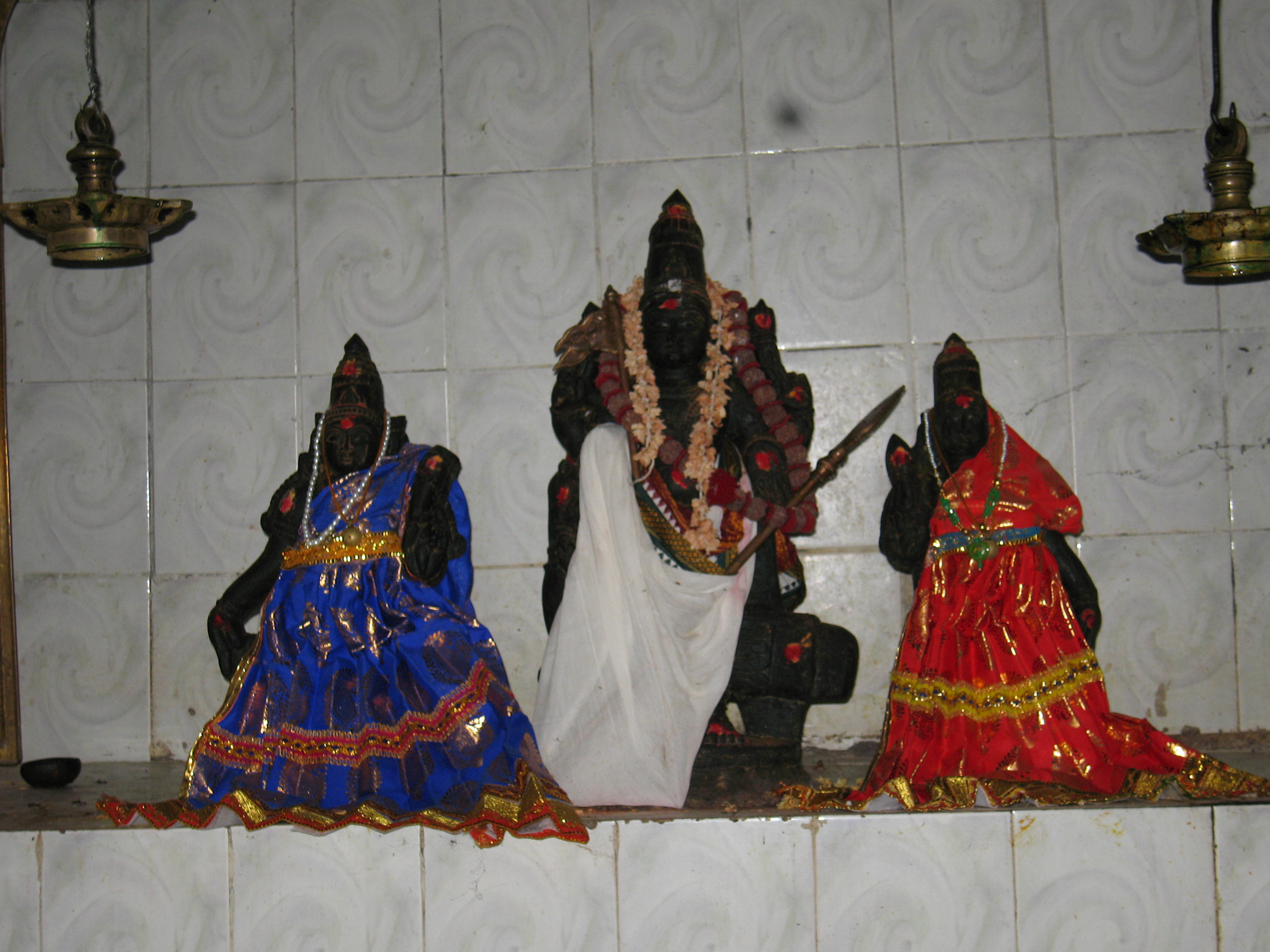

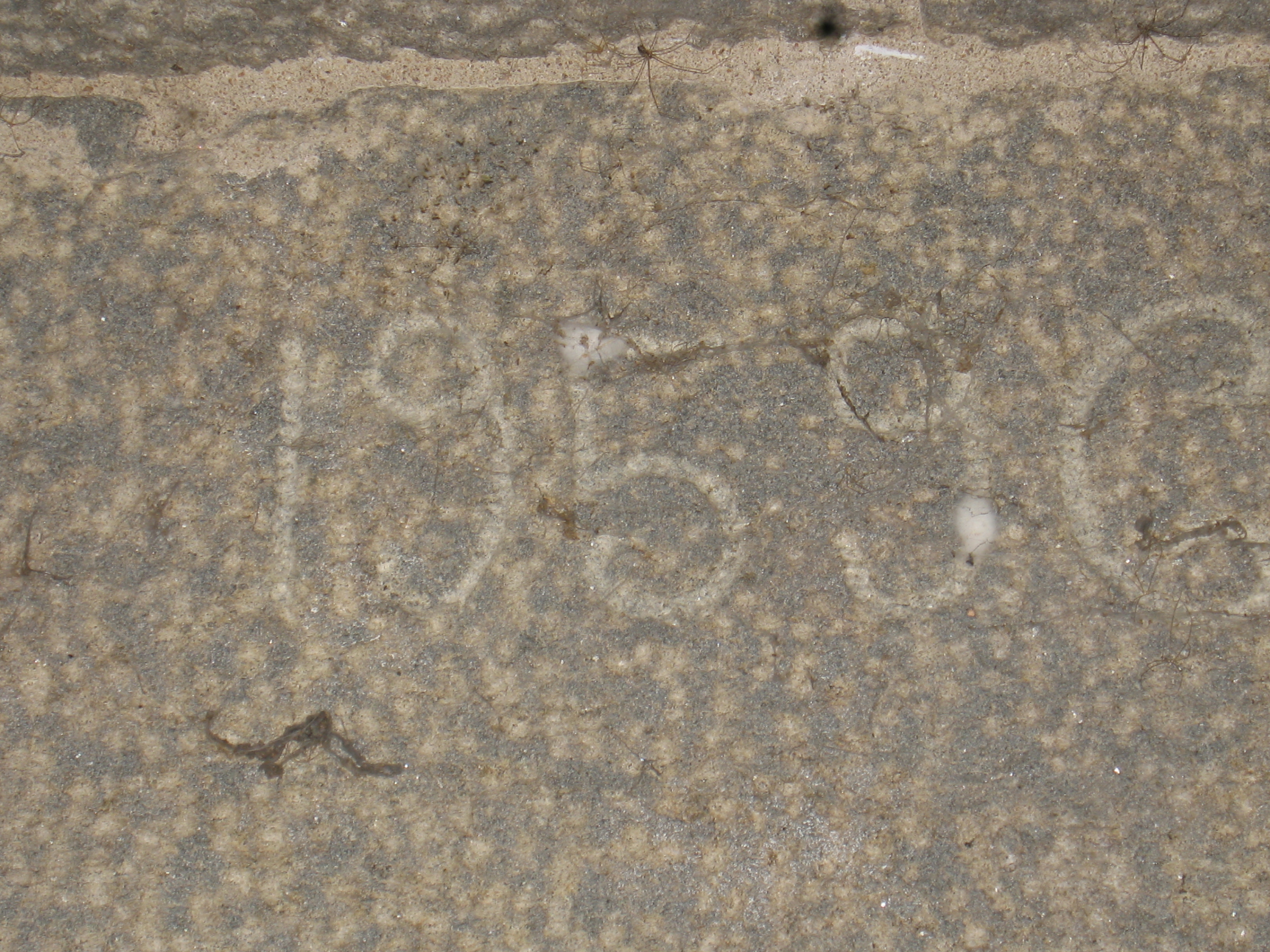

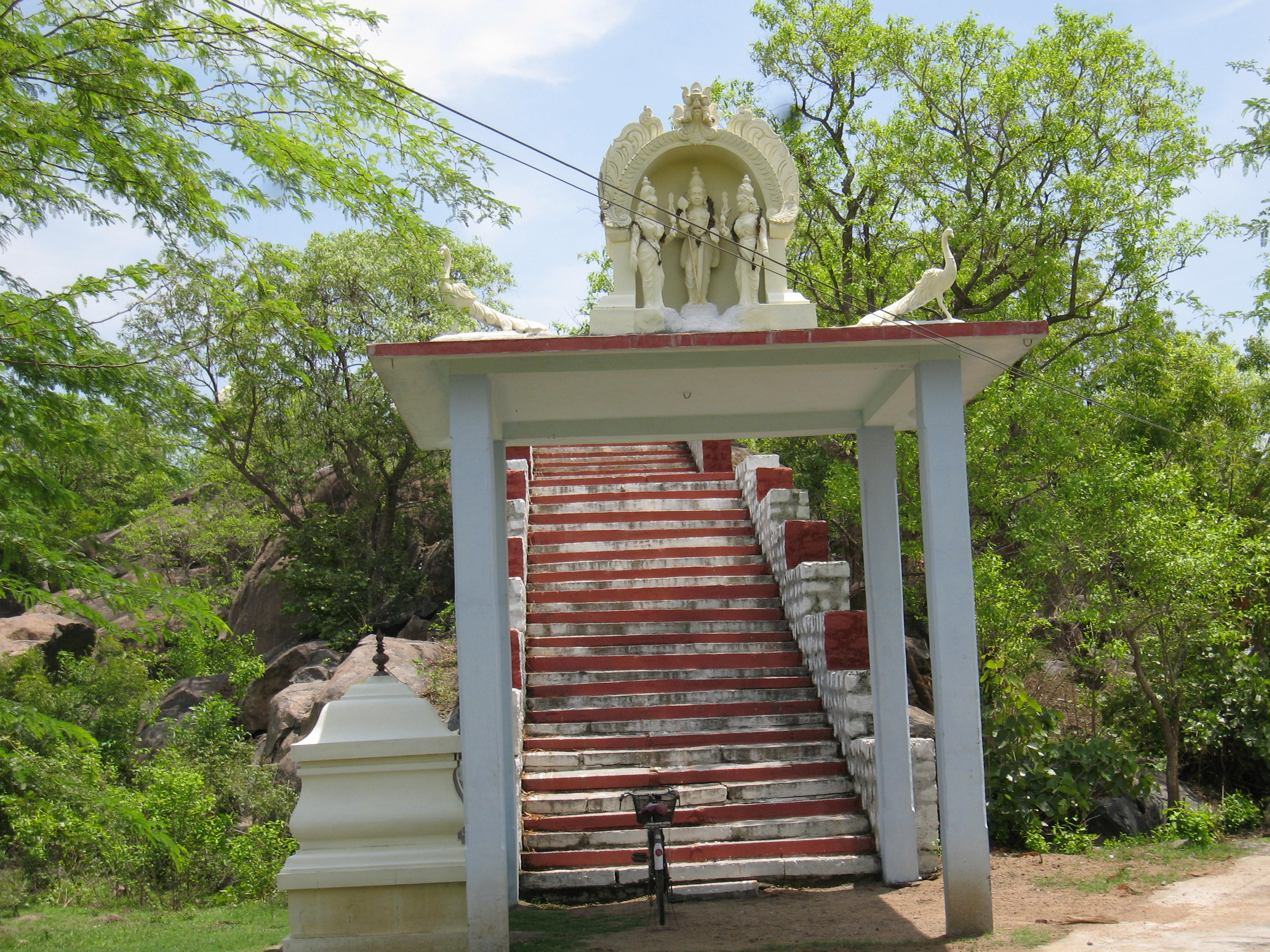

There are many temples, a church and a mosque situated in this village.

- Sri Virushabanathar Digamber Jain temple (more than 800 years old)
- Easvaran koil (more than 800 years old)
- Mariyamman koil
- Panayamman koil
- Vinayagar koil
- Perumal koil
- Saptha Kannigal koil
- Gengaiyamman koil
- Jayarakini annai Alayam (church) (100 years old)
- Mosque
- Pentecost church
- Murugan koil
- Anchenayar temple
- Shri Adhinathar Jain Temple

Kolappalur village is about 12 km from Chetpet in the Arni road and take a diversion at the branch road towards east. Many Jain families have lived in the area since ancient times. A Jinalay was built and dedicated to Shri Adhinathar before the 14th century AD. The antiquity of the temple is known by a stone inscription in the outside wall, belonging to the time of King Sampuvarayar. And no-Lanchan carving of main deity stone idol also a very old art design.

Opposite of Jinalaya a standing rounded pillar is called as Deepakkal, which was used for lighting purposes during the festival time, like Karthigai Deepam. An Ahimsa flag mast is erected adjacent to that. The east facing entranceway (Kudavarai) is isolated because the attached compound wall was demolished recently. (The natives proposed to construct a new one in near future, in addition to other repair works.)

Shri Adhinatha thithankar, a stone plate with eight features carving, is installed upon a plinth. A three tier Viman is covered over it. Thirthankar mortar idols are in a sitting posture along with shamarai maids at the bottom, without maids in the middle, in a standing posture at the top of the Griva portion. The Arthamandap chamber consists of Daily pooja dias at the center. On either side stepped platforms have metal idols like Shri Parshwanathar, other thirthankar for special pooja purposes, Navadevatha, Mahameru, Panchaparameshti, Rathnathraya (three-cluster) Jinars, Yaksh, Yakshies are arranged upon. A Brahmmayakshan stone statue having Thirthankar on the head is placed at the south and Shri Kooshmandini idol at the north over a pedestal individually in the pavilion. The chamber is secured by a collapsible iron gate.

A Mahamandap porch is fitted with grill and doors securely. It has a stone idol of two Thirthankars granite carvings, (one was taken from nearby village and another from the river), and Bahawan Bahubali in standing state with bunch of hair (a unique design) and also a Chadurmugi model viman. A separate shrine chamber without god is also in the portion. All poojas, daily, quarterly and annually has been conducted recurrently. Apart from, a Urchav for Shri Adhinathar urchav murthi, with a street procession, also celebrated on Akshayathrithiyai day and the third day of Thai (Tamil) month every year.

== Schools ==
=== Government higher secondary school ===
Government Higher Secondary School (boys) is situated in Bazar Street, Periya kozhappalur. This school was established in 1950. A total of 62 batches completed in this school from past 62 years. It has produced, farmers, scientists, engineers, doctors, professors, teachers, military officers, police, businessmen, and technicians.

Since it is situated in middle village Periya Kozhappalur surrounded by nearly 22 villages, students used to come to this school by bus, cycle and walking. There were several primary schools, middle schools and high schools situated in around few villages like Avaniyapuram, Namathodu, Marakkunam, Indiravanam. In subsequent years these schools were upgraded, primary to middle schools, and middle to high schools. However, no school has been upgraded to a higher secondary school. Therefore, there is one government and one private higher secondary school for around 22 villages. Apart from this school students go for their higher secondary studies to Arani, Chetpet and Peranamallur.

Ghs (girls)-kolappalur

Carmel matric hr sec school-kolappalur

=== RCM School ===
In May 2016, this school celebrated its 100-year anniversary. The school is near Jayrakini Annai alayam.

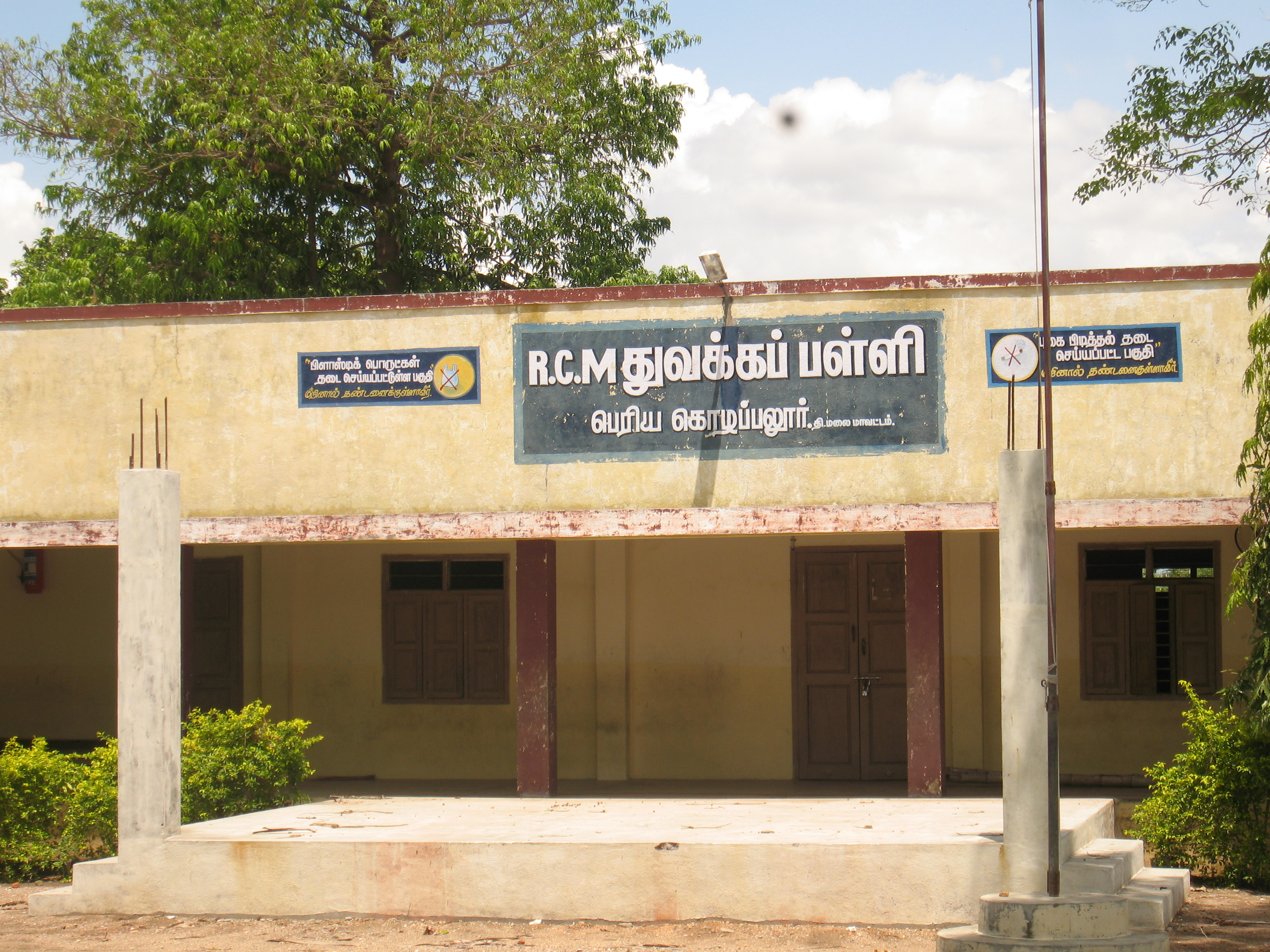

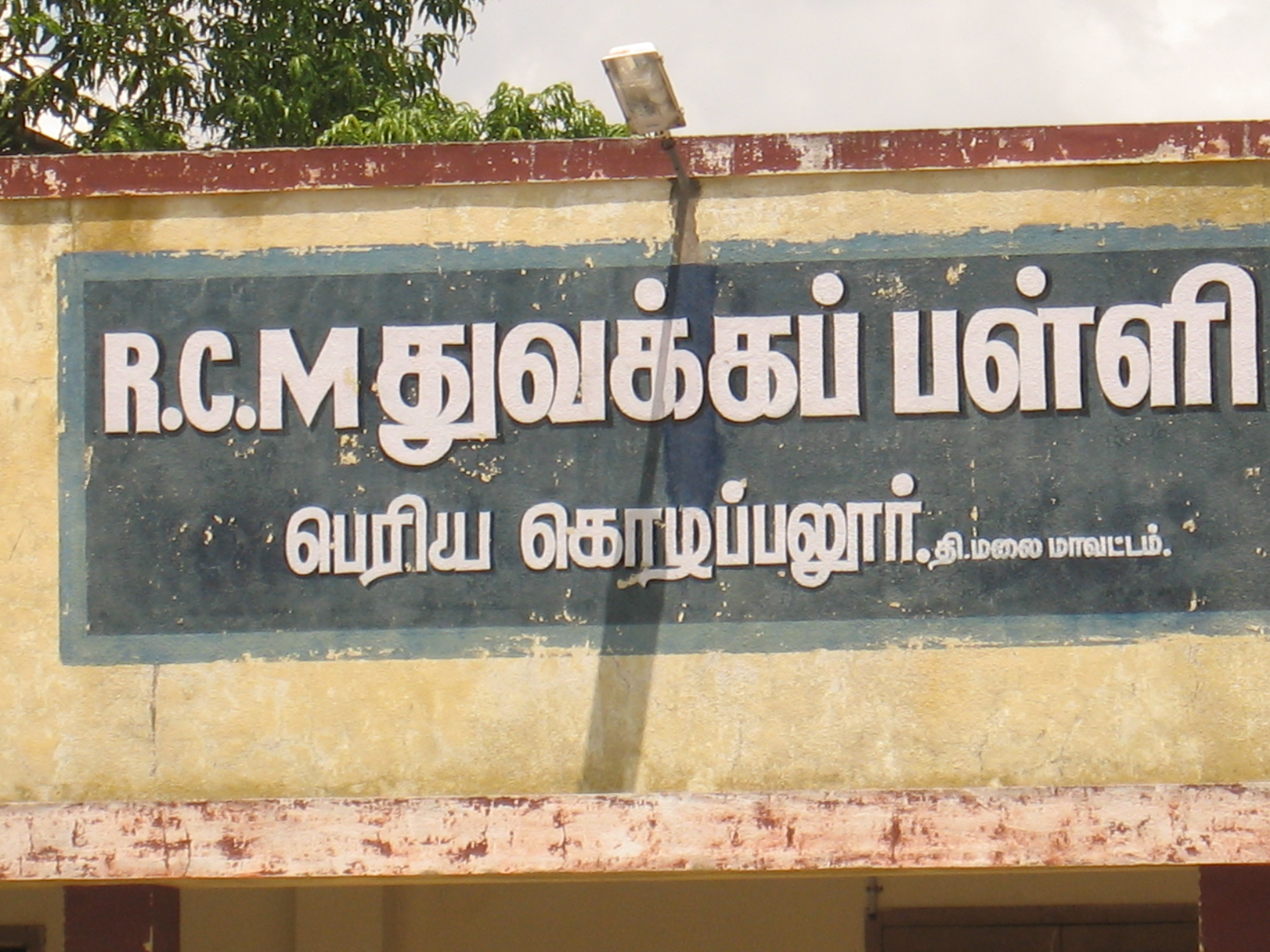

Other schools include:

- Government girl's high school
- Panchayat Union Primary School
- Carmel Matric higher secondary School, the only English medium school in the village

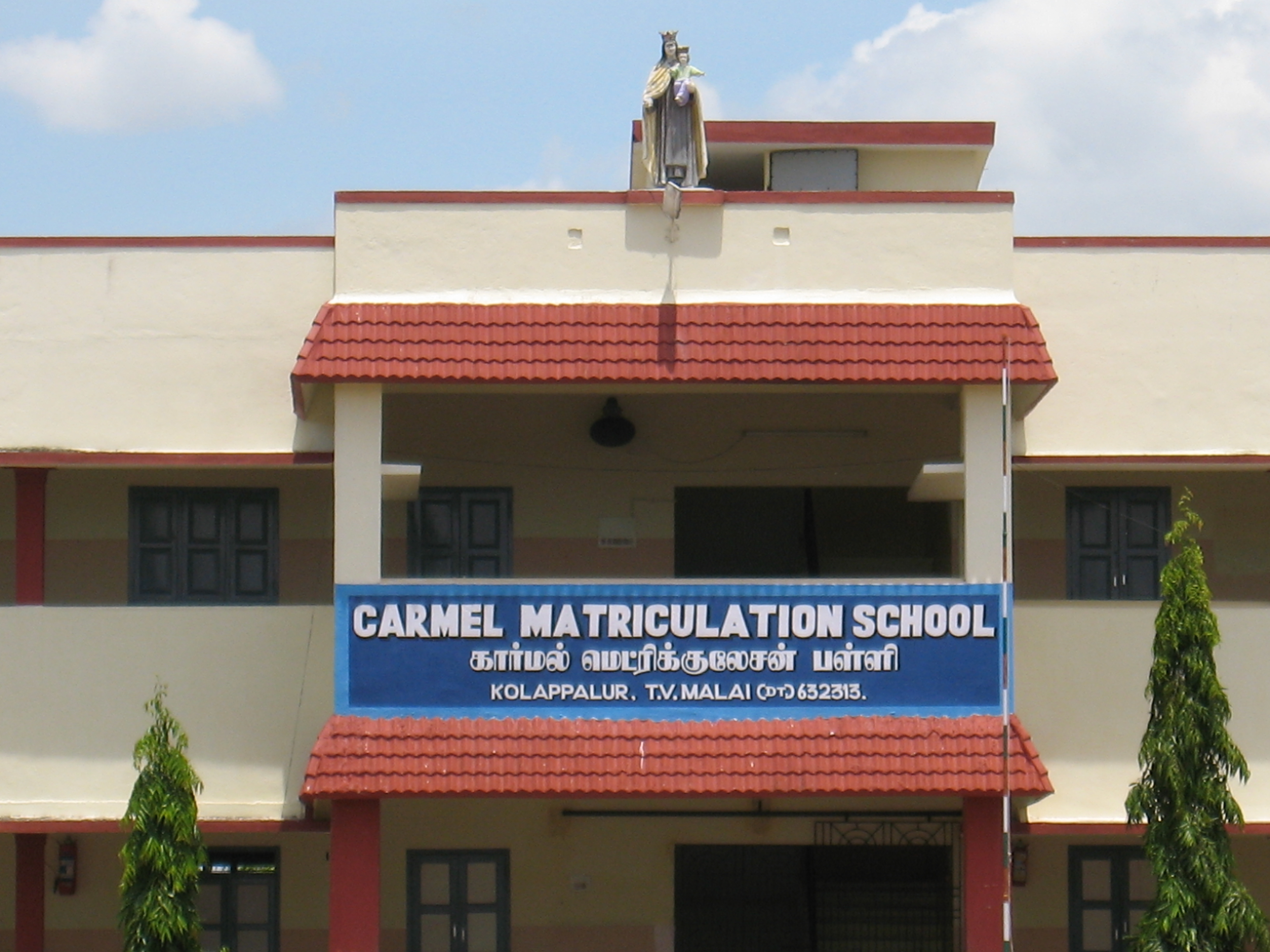

== Hospitals ==
- Government Hospital
