= Ayandur =

- Village
- Location in Tamil Nadu, India
- Coordinates: 11.9679193°N 79.3305667°E
- Country: India
- State: Tamil Nadu
- District: Kallakurichi

Population (2011)
  - Total: 3,045

Languages
  - Official: Tamil
- Time zone: UTC+5:30 (IST)
- PIN: 605755
- Telephone code: 04153 (STD Code)

Ayandur is an Indian village in kandachipuram Taluk, Villupuram district, Tamil Nadu. Ayandur is close to the towns of Thiruvanamali and Villupram.

Ayandur Railway Station is on the Thiruvannamalai-Viluppuram railway link that connects Viluppuram and Katpadi. Train connections include Villuppuram-Vellore (future) and Pondy - Howrah Express. The railway station is located about 21 km from Viluppuram. Villuppuram Junction Railway Station is the nearest railhead. Mambazhappattu Railway Station is 4 km away.
